= List of The Outer Limits (1963 TV series) episodes =

This page is a list of the episodes of The Outer Limits, an American science fiction television series that originally aired on the ABC television network for two seasons from 1963-65.

== Series overview ==
Season	Episodes	Originally released	
Season	Episodes	First released	Last released
1	32	September 16, 1963	May 4, 1964
2	17	September 19, 1964	January 16, 1965

== Episodes ==
=== Season 1 (1963–64) ===
No. overall	No. in season	Title	Directed by	Written by	Original release date	Prod. code
1	1	"The Galaxy Being"	Leslie Stevens	Leslie Stevens	September 16, 1963	1
Allan Maxwell (Cliff Robertson), the owner of radio station KXKVI uses his station's equipment and transmission power to research electromagnetism in the microwave background noise. He makes contact with a humanoid alien from the Andromeda Galaxy. Note: This episode was broadcast before the accidental discovery of the cosmic microwave background a year later.
2	2	"The Hundred Days of the Dragon"	Byron Haskin	Allan Balter and Robert Mintz	September 23, 1963	7
An East Asian government plans to make use of a new flesh-molding technique to take over America by having an impostor replace Presidential candidate William Lyons Selby (Sidney Blackmer).
3	3	"The Architects of Fear"	Byron Haskin	Meyer Dolinsky	September 30, 1963	5
The story takes place during a Cold War period. In an attempt to avert a nuclear holocaust, a group of scientists plan on uniting the world against a common enemy by physically transforming one of their own into an "alien" being to stage a fake invasion. This is achieved by altering scientist Allen Leighton (Robert Culp).
4	4	"The Man with the Power"	Laslo Benedek	Jerome Ross	October 7, 1963	8
An unassuming university professor, Harold Finley (Donald Pleasence) has a brain implant which enables him to control electromagnetism, giving him a kind of telekinesis. But the implant also responds to the subconscious urges of his id.
5	5	"The Sixth Finger"	James Goldstone	Ellis St. Joseph	October 14, 1963	11
In a remote Welsh mining town, a scientist (Edward Mulhare) discovers how to speed up evolutionary mutation. Gwyllim Griffiths (David McCallum), a disgruntled local miner, volunteers for the experiment.
6	6	"The Man Who Was Never Born"	Leonard Horn	Anthony Lawrence	October 28, 1963	12
Andro (Martin Landau), a mutated human from the 22nd century, has returned to the 20th century to change Earth's history and prevent a biological catastrophe.
7	7	"O.B.I.T."	Gerd Oswald	Meyer Dolinsky	November 4, 1963	14
A Senator (Peter Breck) is confronted with obstruction while investigating a disappearance at a government research facility. He learns about an unusual security device that monitors the employees at the facility, called the Outer Band Individuated Teletracer (O.B.I.T.)
8	8	"The Human Factor"	Abner Biberman	David Duncan	November 11, 1963	3
At an outpost in Greenland, an officer (Harry Guardino) begins losing his grip on reality after the death of a soldier whom he commanded into an icy crevice. Haunted by the soldier's specter, the officer decides that he must detonate an atomic bomb to obliterate the crevice and the outpost as well. The post's doctor (Gary Merrill) uses a unique mind probe in an attempt to understand what is driving the officer mad. When an unexpected earthquake causes the probe to malfunction, the minds of the doctor and the officer are switched. This switch enables the insane officer to make plans to detonate the atomic device under the guise of the doctor, while the real doctor is confined to a padded cell.
9	9	"Corpus Earthling"	Gerd Oswald	S : Louis Charbonneau; T : Orin Borsten	November 18, 1963	16
Parasitic aliens, with a plan to take over the human race, take refuge in a geologist's laboratory disguised as rocks. Although undetected by ordinary humans, one doctor with an implanted metal plate in his skull, from an old injury (Robert Culp) is able to "hear" the aliens communicate with each other while they discuss their plot. Although the doctor is unsure if what he hears is a delusion or not, the aliens see him as a threat and set out to kill him.
10	10	"Nightmare"	John Erman	Joseph Stefano	December 2, 1963	15
Human soldiers en route to fight the alien Ebonites on the latter's homeworld are subjected to physical and psychological torture and interrogation. This was remade for season 4 of the 1995 reboot series. Note: This episode was initially pre-empted due to the coverage of the state funeral of President John F. Kennedy on November 25, 1963. When the episode did air (in December) it was one of the most watched television episodes aired at the time, and the most-watched television broadcast of any show that week in every television media market in Maine, Wyoming, Alabama, South Carolina and Tennessee as well as in every media market in Georgia outside of Atlanta.
11	11	"It Crawled Out of the Woodwork"	Gerd Oswald	Joseph Stefano	December 9, 1963	18
After the death of a recently hired employee at an energy plant, a police sergeant investigates, and discovers unauthorized work going on there which has taken control of the entire scientific staff.
12	12	"The Borderland"	Leslie Stevens	Leslie Stevens	December 16, 1963	2
A British millionaire hires a psychic to contact his dead son, but she is exposed as a fraud by scientist Ian Fraser. Fraser insists that he has a method that can create a bridge to what might be the afterlife, but he needs the energy of a metropolitan power grid to do so. The millionaire agrees to arrange the situation if Fraser attempts to contact the dead son. Fraser agrees and the experiment begins, but the psychic reappears, with a plan to sabotage the experiment.
13	13	"Tourist Attraction"	Laslo Benedek	Dean Riesner	December 23, 1963	4
Domineering millionaire John Dexter leads a group of explorers in pursuit of a lake monster that supposedly lives in the waters of San Blas, a South American dictatorship. When the creature is captured, Dexter plans to take it home to further his reputation, but San Blas' dictator, Juan Mercurio, plans to use it to attract tourists. The creature, however, has its own ideas.
14	14	"The Zanti Misfits"	Leonard Horn	Joseph Stefano	December 30, 1963	17
Military forces have cordoned off a California ghost town awaiting the arrival of a spacecraft from the planet Zanti. The leaders of that world have decided that Earth is the perfect place to exile their undesirables. They threaten "total destruction" if their penal ship is harassed. Ben Garth, a bank robber on the run, unwittingly crosses into the cordoned-off area and approaches the Zanti ship, triggering a massive jailbreak. Earth's nervous soldiers attack the Zantis, killing them all, then fearfully await the expected reprisal. Instead, they receive a message from the Zanti leaders, thanking them. Since the Zanti cannot kill their own kind, they instead sent them to the galactic experts on killing — the humans of Earth. In 1997, TV Guide ranked this episode #98 on its list of the 100 Greatest Episodes.
15	15	"The Mice"	Alan Crosland Jr.	S : Lou Morheim; T : Joseph Stefano; S/T : Bill S. Ballinger	January 6, 1964	19
A convict volunteers to be a human guinea pig for a matter transportation experiment. In reality the experiment is supposed to be an exchange of scientists between Earth and an alien race, the Chromoites. As problems arise and researchers die, the convict is blamed, but it may also be a sinister plot to turn the world into a food source for the alien creatures.
16	16	"Controlled Experiment"	Leslie Stevens	Leslie Stevens	January 13, 1964	6
In the only comedic episode of the series, two Martians use a time manipulation device to examine the human practice called murder. Episode star Barry Morse says that this was a pilot for a proposed science fiction comedy series that was subsequently broadcast as an Outer Limits episode.
17	17	"Don't Open Till Doomsday"	Gerd Oswald	Joseph Stefano	January 20, 1964	22
In a story laden with sexual subtext, an eloping couple arrive at the now-decayed home and rent a room from the eccentric owner. The young bride subsequently disappears, captured by a monstrous being from another dimension.
18	18	"ZZZZZ"	John Brahm	Meyer Dolinsky	January 27, 1964	21
Ben Fields is an entomologist seeking a live-in lab assistant to stay at the home he shares with his wife Francesca. Regina, a mutant queen bee in human form, is searching for a human mate to prolong her species' life span and applies for the job.
19	19	"The Invisibles"	Gerd Oswald	Joseph Stefano	February 3, 1964	20
A secret society known as the Invisibles recruits three outcasts to help them with their aim of infiltrating the U.S. government. They are to attach psychic alien parasites to key government leaders to bring them and the world under alien control. One recruit is actually an undercover agent assigned to bring down the Invisibles, but is his cover really as good as he thinks?
20	20	"The Bellero Shield"	John Brahm	S : Lou Morheim; S/T : Joseph Stefano	February 10, 1964	23
A scientist (Martin Landau) builds a powerful laser weapon. One night, a benevolent alien from a light world travels down the laser to Earth. The scientist's wife (Sally Kellerman) tries to shoot the alien with a laser gun, but he raises a powerful shield. The scientist and the alien share knowledge with one another. When the scientist leaves, the wife shoots the alien in order to gain control of his shield technology. During a demonstration, she raises the shield but is unable to take it down, trapping herself inside. The alien, believed to be dead, comes to her rescue and lowers the shield before dying. The woman, left insane with guilt at killing the alien that only thought to help her, believes herself to still be trapped within the shield as the episode ends.
21	21	"The Children of Spider County"	Leonard Horn	Anthony Lawrence	February 17, 1964	25
A group of young prodigies has vanished, and it appears that they came from the same remote area. A government agent sent to investigate this finds that one young prodigy is still there, and his alien patriarch is planning a family reunion somewhere other than Earth.
22	22	"Specimen: Unknown"	Gerd Oswald	Stephen Lord	February 24, 1964	10
An astronaut finds a strange organism attached to the outside of his team's spaceship. Exposed to light and air inside it develops into a beautiful flower—but it has a deadly scent, and an aggressive growth habit. When the astronauts seek to return to Earth for help, they bring the invasive new species with them.
23	23	"Second Chance"	Paul Stanley	T : Lou Morheim; S/T : Lin Dane	March 2, 1964	27
A disgruntled scientist operates a carnival ride that resembles a spaceship. An alien modifies the attraction and makes it into a real spaceship, in order to capture humans.
24	24	"Moonstone"	Robert Florey	S : Lou Morheim and Joseph Stefano; T : William Bast	March 9, 1964	13
Researchers at a Moon base discover an alien organism. They find out it's a vast repository of an alien intelligence that has fled the tyranny of its home world. When the alien tyrants arrive to take back the organism, the researchers have to decide what should be risked in the pursuit of knowledge.
25	25	"The Mutant"	Alan Crosland Jr.	S : Jerome B. Thomas; T : Allan Balter and Robert Mintz	March 16, 1964	26
An astronaut comes to an outpost on an alien planet to investigate a death among a group of scientists who are studying the possibility of colonizing the planet. The scientists include Julie, the astronaut's old flame. They all seem to behave strangely but won't explain why. They are particularly nervous around Reese Fowler, a researcher who constantly wears goggles. A scientist attempts to leave a scribbled note in the astronaut's pocket. As the scientist exits the room he bumps into Fowler, who seems to read his mind and then destroys him. The astronaut is led to a remote cave where he discovers that the others live in fear of Reese, who developed superhuman abilities when he was exposed to the planet's chemical rainfall, which caused him to mutate. Reese, knowing he would lose his abilities once in space, holds the others captive. The astronaut must somehow overcome a man who can read minds and kill with a touch.
26	26	"The Guests"	Paul Stanley	Donald S. Sanford	March 23, 1964	29
A young drifter finds an old man dying by the side of a remote country road. He goes to an old house, looking for help. The inhabitants are all unhelpful, mean-spirited, and seemingly avoiding reality - all with the exception of a soulful young woman. Strangely compelled, the young man is forced to go upstairs. There, he discovers that the house is the lair of an alien, keeping the group of desperate humans captive until it can comprehend every characteristic of humanity.
27	27	"Fun and Games"	Gerd Oswald	T : Joseph Stefano; S/T : Robert Specht	March 30, 1964	28
Mike Benson and Laura Hanley are offered a chance for redemption. They can save Earth from being utterly destroyed over a period of several years for the entertainment of a jaded extraterrestrial audience. They can provide alternative entertainment by battling to the death two primitive aliens, who are likewise fighting to save their own, distant world.
28	28	"The Special One"	Gerd Oswald	Oliver Crawford	April 6, 1964	31
Roy and his wife Aggie are delighted but puzzled when they meet Mr. Zeno, who explains that he is a government educator sent to cultivate the mind of their gifted son, Kenny. Roy becomes worried, however, when he discovers that Kenny is learning things that are not accepted by Earthly science. When Roy discovers that the government education department knows nothing about any "Mr. Zeno," he confronts the educator only to discover that he is an alien, reeducating children in a plot to take over the world. Kenny now has superhuman knowledge, and the question is, where do his loyalties now lie?
29	29	"A Feasibility Study"	Byron Haskin	Joseph Stefano	April 13, 1964	9
A suburban neighborhood awakens one morning to find out that everyone has been transported to another planet. The planet's race intend to study the feasibility of enslaving humans for manual labor. First, the aliens must overcome humanity's susceptibility to disease and the willpower of humankind's resistance to slavery.
30	30	"Production and Decay of Strange Particles"	Leslie Stevens	Leslie Stevens	April 20, 1964	30
While experimenting on subatomic particles, a team of physics researchers start a reaction that consumes one scientist after another. The reaction grows towards a terrible climax, and the survivors fear that they may be powerless to stop it.
31	31	"The Chameleon"	Gerd Oswald	S : Lou Morheim and Joseph Stefano; S/T : Robert Towne	April 27, 1964	32
A flying saucer has landed in a remote part of the United States and then wiped out a military patrol that was sent to investigate. Concerned that the saucer contains nuclear materials, the authorities decide on a wild scheme: to send Mace (Robert Duvall), an alienated CIA daredevil, to infiltrate the ship. Genetically modified to pass as an alien, Mace finds that he is beginning to think as an alien, and he begins to question his allegiance — and his very nature.
32	32	"The Forms of Things Unknown"	Gerd Oswald	Joseph Stefano	May 4, 1964	24
Two recent murderesses encounter a strange young inventor named Hobart (David McCallum) who says he has found a means to "tilt the cycles of time" and return the dead to life. (Originally planned as a pilot program for a suspense-horror anthology series to be called The Unknown. The pilot version contains different versions of events.)

=== Season 2 (1964–65) ===
No. overall	No. in season	Title	Directed by	Written by	Original release date	Prod. code
33	1	"Soldier"	Gerd Oswald	Harlan Ellison	September 19, 1964	34
A thousand years in the future, two footsoldiers clash on a battlefield. A random energy weapon strikes both soldiers, and they are hurled into a time vortex. While one soldier is trapped in the matrix of time, the other, Qarlo Clobregnny (Michael Ansara), materializes on a city street in the year 1964. Qarlo is soon captured and interrogated by Paul Kagan (Lloyd Nolan), a philologist, and his origin is discovered. As progress is made in "taming" Qarlo, the time eddy holding the enemy soldier slowly weakens. Eventually, Qarlo comes to live with the Kagan family. However, after the enemy soldier is freed and finally materializes in 1964, and he tracks Qarlo to the Kagan home. In a final hand-to-hand battle, Qarlo sacrifices his life to kill the enemy and save the Kagan family.
34	2	"Cold Hands, Warm Heart"	Charles Haas	Daniel B. Ullman	September 26, 1964	33
After completing the first crewed mission to orbit Venus, astronaut Jefferson Barton (William Shatner) returns to Earth with recurring nightmares and an increasing inability to stay warm. Barton's condition continue to worsen, resulting in a peculiar webbing of his fingers, and only after his nightmares become more vivid is he reminded of an unrevealed alien encounter in the Venusian atmosphere. Barton's doctors suspect the astronaut had been genetically affected by his mission, and they then struggle to treat and cure him before his mutations completely take over.
35	3	"Behold, Eck!"	Byron Haskin	S : William R. Cox; T : John Mantley	October 3, 1964	37
The titular Eck is a creature from a two-dimensional world, trapped in our world when he fell into a time-space warp. Frightened and alone, he soon realizes that a small number of humans are able to see him with the help of special glasses whose lenses are made from meteoritic quartz. Eck proceeds to find where these glasses are made and discovers Dr. Stone (Peter Lind Hayes), an optics engineer. Unfortunately, in his search for the source of the glasses, Eck terrifies many, even frightening one eyewitness to the point of having a fatal heart attack. Precipitously, the police are anxiously after him now as well. Eck explains that he requires special lenses to see the time warp from where he came. He says the only way the doorway will close is for him to do so as he leaves our dimension. Should the time warp remain open and an object from this world, such as a "plane or a bird", fly in through it and reach his dimension, it will tear the time-space fabric, destroying both worlds. Dr. Stone and his secretary Elizabeth race against the clock to help return Eck to his world. By sunrise, Eck may be dead and the time warp left open.
36	4	"Expanding Human"	Gerd Oswald	Francis Cockrell	October 10, 1964	40
Professor Peter Wayne (Keith Andes) is disturbed to hear that his university colleague, Dr. Roy Clinton (Skip Homeier), is pursuing forbidden drug experiments with a group of graduate students. When one of the students turns up dead, Professor Wayne investigates Clinton's activities, and discovers that consciousness-expansion can have powerful and dangerous consequences.
37	5	"Demon with a Glass Hand"	Byron Haskin	Harlan Ellison	October 17, 1964	41
Trent (Robert Culp) is a man with no memories of his life beyond ten days ago. His left hand, which is made of glass, seems to be an artificially intelligent computer that can speak. Three fingers on that hand are missing though, and they must be found so that Trent can discover what his purpose is. In the meantime, he is being hunted by human-looking aliens. One of them tells Trent that he and the aliens are from 1000 years in the future when Earth has been conquered, a plague has destroyed all life, and all humans have mysteriously vanished. Trent successfully recovers the three missing fingers, and he discovers that he is not actually a man but a robot. Within his abdomen, stored on a gold wire, are the human survivors of the alien invasion of the future, whom he must safeguard until the events of the future have become the events of the past and the plague has dissipated.
38	6	"Cry of Silence"	Charles Haas	S : Louis Charbonneau; T : Robert C. Dennis	October 24, 1964	42
A city couple (Eddie Albert, June Havoc) driving in the countryside makes a turn into a mysterious valley road where their car hits a rock and stops working. After the couple leaves their car, the wife has a slight accident in which she rolls downhill and sprains her ankle. When the husband reaches her, they realize they are being stalked...by tumbleweeds that appear to be possessed by some form of energy. At first, they attempt to keep the tumbleweeds at bay with fire but soon run out of firewood. They are saved by a slightly disturbed farmer named Lamont (Arthur Hunnicutt), who explains that things have been awkward in the valley ever since a UFO landed two weeks before, causing his farm to die out. Lamont tells them he stayed merely out of curiosity, but now the weeds won't allow him to leave either. The three make their way to Lamont's house where they spend a frightening night surrounded by first tumbleweeds, then thousands of frogs. Come morning, they walk back to the car without trouble, only to be attacked by living rocks once they get there. One rock kills Lamont. The couple runs back to the house, where the husband finally decides that the only way they are ever to leave there is to attempt to communicate with whatever is behind all this.
39	7	"The Invisible Enemy"	Byron Haskin	Jerry Sohl	October 31, 1964	35
A pair of astronauts land on Mars; when one goes out to explore, he is heard screaming, and the other's last transmission indicates that he has gone out to investigate. A second Mars Mission crew later lands, tasked to both explore and find out what happened to the first crew. One at a time, however, the astronauts disappear from sight, perhaps victims of some unseen Martian threat.
40	8	"Wolf 359"	Laslo Benedek	S : Richard Landau; S/T : Seeleg Lester	November 7, 1964	38
Working on behalf of corporate interests, scientist Jonathan Meridith (Patrick O'Neal) has created a miniature version of a remote planet in his laboratory. When a mysterious life-form evolves along with the developing experiment, however, Meridith must weigh the value of his experiment versus the possible dangers.
41	9	"I, Robot"	Leon Benson	S : Eando Binder; T : Robert C. Dennis	November 14, 1964	43
Adam Link is accused of murder; however, Adam Link is a robot who maintains the victim's death was the result of an accident. Placed on trial for the murder of Professor Link (Peter Brocco), his creator, Adam Link is defended by the professor's niece Nina (Marianna Hill) and retired lawyer Thurman Cutler (Howard da Silva). Ultimately, it turns out that the prosecution is not simply placing the robot on trial but humankind itself as irresponsible and abusive of technology.
42	10	"The Inheritors: Part 1"	James Goldstone	S : Ed Adamson; S/T : Seeleg Lester and Sam Neuman	November 21, 1964	44
Four U.S. Army soldiers, with nothing in common other than having served in Korea and been shot in their heads, cheat death, each attain an I.Q. of over 200, and begin working together on a mysterious project. Intelligence officer Adam Ballard (Robert Duvall) discovers that the men are building a starship, and recruiting handicapped children to live on the ship. Ballard is afraid these helpless children are to be victims of alien abduction.
43	11	"The Inheritors: Part 2"	James Goldstone	S : Ed Adamson; S/T : Seeleg Lester and Sam Neuman	November 28, 1964	44
Ballard locates the starship, which is protected by a force field, and confronts the men, begging them to turn off the field and release the captive children. They inform him that the children are not captives, and that the superior alien intelligence behind their project has healed the children of their handicaps, and needs the children to inherit and continue their culture, when their dying species has become extinct. If the children remain on Earth, their handicaps will return. Outcasts on Earth, the children and the enhanced Earthmen have voluntarily agreed to leave Earth for a new world, and preserve the legacy of the aliens.
44	12	"Keeper of the Purple Twilight"	Charles Haas	S : Stephen Lord; T : Milton Krims	December 5, 1964	39
As a prelude for the invasion of Earth by aliens, the extraterrestrial being Ikar (Robert Webber) studies the human race. The one thing he cannot comprehend is emotion. Obsessed scientist Eric Plummer (Warren Stevens) is near a nervous breakdown trying to complete a magnetic disintegrator that will convert matter into pure energy. Unbeknownst to him, his weapon would be of help to Ikar's invasion force should it be completed, so Ikar makes a deal with Plummer. He will help Plummer complete the invention so long as Plummer allows him to steal his emotions for a "test drive". But due to the interference of Plummer's girlfriend (Gail Kobe), Ikar is unable to control or understand his emotions, causing the experiment to backfire. Ikar's behavior comes to the attention of his superiors, and they dispatch soldier forms of his species, of which he is an advanced intellectual worker form, to discipline him.
45	13	"The Duplicate Man"	Gerd Oswald	S : Clifford Simak; T : Robert C. Dennis	December 19, 1964	45
In 2025, wealthy researcher Henderson James keeps an illegal alien of a different kind in his laboratory. The alien, a beast known as a "Megasoid", is the last of its kind on Earth. It was imported under the table by a corrupt space captain bribed by James, and it is incredibly dangerous. The megasoid escapes the lab, and Henderson James decides the only way to destroy it before it reproduces is to send out a clone of himself to assassinate the alien. Clones are extremely restricted by law in the 21st century, but James finds that money talks. He spends $100,000 to illicitly buy a clone of himself, and programs it to hunt down and kill the megasoid. Things become complicated once the duplicate, with a hint from the megasoid, realises what he is.
46	14	"Counterweight"	Paul Stanley	S : Jerry Sohl; T : Milton Krims	December 26, 1964	36
Four scientists, a newspaper man, and a construction tycoon agree to spend 261 days in isolation in an interstellar flight simulation. But the experiment is secretly infiltrated by an alien presence that has other plans in mind.
47	15	"The Brain of Colonel Barham"	Charles Haas	S : Sidney Ellis; T : Robert C. Dennis	January 2, 1965	46
The space race continues as the American military strives to be the first to successfully land a man on Mars. But the best candidate for the job, Col. Barham, is dying of an incurable ailment. It is decided to separate his brain from his body and keep it alive, with neural implants connecting it to visual and audio input/output for the mission. But without a body, the brain becomes extremely powerful and megalomaniacal.
48	16	"The Premonition"	Gerd Oswald	T : Sam Roeca; S/T : Ib Melchior	January 9, 1965	47
Jim, an X-15 rocket-powered research aircraft pilot and his wife become trapped 10 seconds ahead of their time and watch time unfold to catch up with them at about 1 second every 30 minutes. In the time left before returning to synch with normal time, they see that their daughter is about to be hit by a truck. But to stop the accident could mean to stay forever stuck in time. They must be back in the positions they were in five hours ago before time "catches up" with them. After dealing with a phantom (exposed as a negative image) who experienced the same situation some time back and did not make it out in time, Jim finally hits upon a way to save his daughter from death. He attaches a car's seatbelts from the back wheel to the handbrake of the military truck. With no time to spare, he and his wife hurry back to their original placements. When time catches up, the truck groans, rolls forward, and the rear-wheel/seatbelt solution pulls the emergency brake, stopping the truck. Their daughter is safe, the world returns to normal, and no one except Jim and his wife are the wiser.
49	17	"The Probe"	Felix Feist	S : Sam Neuman; T : Seeleg Lester	January 16, 1965	48
The final episode of The Outer Limits deals with four plane crash survivors who suddenly find themselves trapped in an alien space probe that was taking water samples. Inside, they find a puzzle they need to solve before all four are killed.

== Home media ==
The following DVD sets were released by MGM Home Entertainment.

DVD set	Episodes	Release date
The Outer Limits: Season 1	32	3 September 2002
The Outer Limits: Season 2	17	2 September 2003
The Outer Limits: Volume 1	16	5 June 2007
The Outer Limits: Volume 2	16	28 August 2007
The Outer Limits: Volume 3	17	30 October 2007
The Outer Limits: The Complete Original Series	49	21 October 2008

== See also ==
- List of The Outer Limits (1995 TV series) episodes
