= Douglas Henderson (actor) =

American actor (1919–1978)

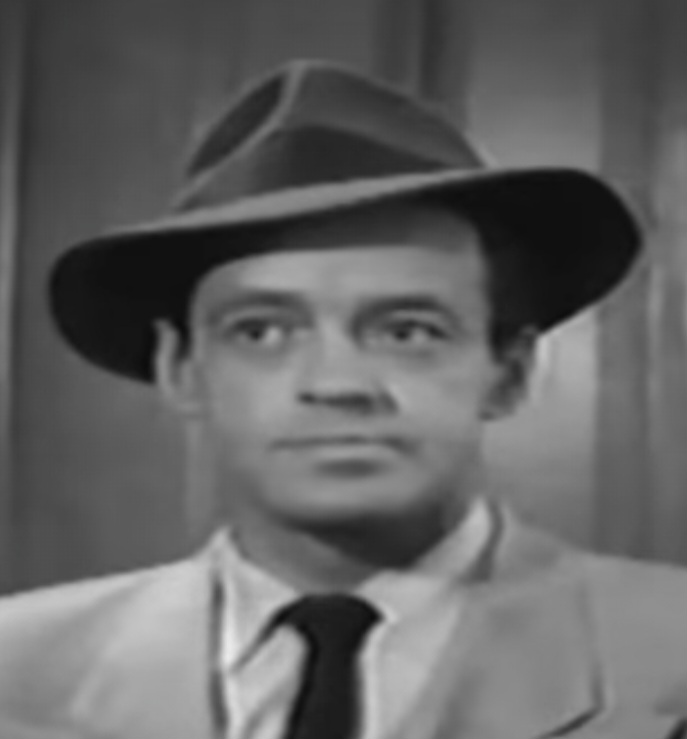
- Henderson in an episode of The Public Defender (1954)
- Born: January 14, 1919; Montclair, New Jersey, U.S.
- Died: April 5, 1978 (aged 59); Studio City, California, U.S.
- Occupation: Actor
- Years active: 1944–1976

Douglas Henderson (January 14, 1919 – April 5, 1978) was an American film and television actor.

== Biography ==
Henderson was born in Montclair, New Jersey. He served in the United States Marine Corps during World War II.

After having been active in stock theater in the eastern United States, Henderson shifted to film in 1952, with his appearance in Stanley Kramer's Eight Iron Men. Additional film appearances include the 1962 John Frankenheimer film The Manchurian Candidate, in which he played Col. Milt, the direct supervisor of the Maj. Marco character (played by Frank Sinatra). He played Congressman Morrissey in the 1968 comedy Stay Away, Joe starring Elvis Presley.

On television, Henderson made six guest appearances on Perry Mason, including the role of title character and defendant Felix Heidemann in the 1960 episode, "The Case of the Clumsy Clown". In 1962, Henderson guest-starred as Peter Gregson, in "The Case of the Poison Pen." In 1963, he again played the defendant, this time Dwight Garrett, in "The Case of the Elusive Element". In 1965, he played murder victim Frank Jones, alias Frank Jensen, in "The Case of the Wrongful Writ", and in 1966, he again played the defendant, Greg Stanley, in "The Case of the Crafty Kidnapper". From 1966 to 1969, Henderson played the supervisor of James West and Artemus Gordon on The Wild Wild West.

== Death ==
Henderson committed suicide in Studio City, California, via carbon monoxide poisoning on April 5, 1978.

== Filmography ==
=== Film ===
His credited film appearances included roles in:

- She's a Sweetheart (1944) - Soldier
- Objective, Burma! (1945) - Paratrooper (uncredited)
- A Guy, a Gal and a Pal (1945) - Soldier (uncredited)
- Over 21 (1945) - Officer Candidate (uncredited)
- Flying Leathernecks (1951) - Lt. Foster (uncredited)
- Fearless Fagan (1952) - Mail Clerk (uncredited)
- Big Jim McLain (1952) - J.J. Donahue - Marine Boarding Ship (uncredited)
- Back at the Front (1952) - Bit Role (uncredited)
- Eight Iron Men (1952) - Hunter
- The War of the Worlds (1953) - Staff Sergeant (uncredited)
- Abbott and Costello Go to Mars (1953) - Announcer (uncredited)
- From Here to Eternity (1953) - Cpl. Champ Wilson (uncredited)
- Mad at the World (1955) - Ollie, Fingerprint Man (uncredited)
- King Dinosaur (1955) - Dr. Richard Gordon
- The Shrike (1955) - Burt Fielding (uncredited)
- The Book of Acts Series (1957) - Hired Assassin
- Invasion of the Saucer Men (1957) - Lt. Wilkins, USAF
- God Is My Partner (1957) - George (Doctor) (uncredited)
- The Dalton Girls (1957) - Bank Cashier
- No Place to Land (1958) - Roy Dillon
- Cage of Evil (1960) - Barney
- Sniper's Ridge (1961) - Sgt. Sweatish
- The Manchurian Candidate (1962) - Colonel Milt
- Black Zoo (1963) - Lt. Mel Duggan
- Johnny Cool (1963) - FBI Man
- The Americanization of Emily (1964) - Capt. Marvin Ellender
- The Sandpiper (1965) - Phil Sutcliff
- Fireball 500 (1966) - Agent Hastings
- Don't Make Waves (1967) - Henderson
- Stay Away, Joe (1968) - Congressman Morrissey
- Pendulum (1969) - Detective Hanauer
- Zig Zag (1970) - Dr. Leonard

=== TV Series ===
The main part of his career was in television. Television series in which he made appearances include:

- The Adventures of Superman "Semi Private Eye" (1954) - Noodles
- The Silent Service "The Jack at Tokyo" (1957) - Chief Machinist Mate Archer
- Highway Patrol (1957-1958) - Jim Rogers / Buck Lester / George Wilson
- Perry Mason (1959-1966) - Greg Stanley / Frank Jones / Dwight Garrett / Peter Gregson / Felix Heidemann / Ralph Curtis
- 77 Sunset Strip (1961-1962) - Reginald Stanhope (uncredited) / Dr. Robert Lawrence
- The Alfred Hitchcock Hour (1963) (Season 1 Episode 22: "Diagnosis: Danger") - Mr. Huntziger
- The Outer Limits: The Architects of Fear, The Chameleon, and Behold, Eck!. (1963-1964) - Detective Lieutenant Runyan / Dr. Tillyard / Scientist
- Hazel (1964) - Courtney Hicks
- Rawhide (1964) - Cal
- Combat! "Dateline" (1965) - G2 Intelligence officer, Captain Reardon
- Daniel Boone (1966) - Gerald Ainsley
- The Fugitive (1966) - Lieutenant Irwin
- Bonanza (1965-1967) - Major Dawson / Dr. Evans / Reverend Holmes
- The Invaders (1967) - Lieutenant Farley / Martin
- Lassie (1965-1968) - Dave Kirkland / Dave
- The Virginian (1965-1969) - Ben Cooper / Sam Jenkins / Leonard Walters
- The Wild Wild West (1966-1969) - Colonel James Richmond
- Mannix (1965-1971) - Philip Crane / Thomas Ferguson / Simms / Townsman at Well (uncredited) / Tom Lockwood / Police Detective (uncredited)
- The F.B.I. (1965-1971) - Thurman / SAC Converse / S.A.C. Page Blanchard / Bryant Durant / S.A.C. Bryant Durant
- Mission Impossible (1971-1972) - Anders / George Miller / Henry Packard
