= The Special One (The Outer Limits) =

- The Outer Limits episode
- Episode no.: Season 1 Episode 28
- Directed by: Gerd Oswald
- Written by: Oliver Crawford
- Cinematography by: Kenneth Peach
- Production code: 31
- Original air date: April 6, 1964

Guest appearances
- Macdonald Carey; Richard Ney; Flip Mark

Episode chronology
← Previous "Fun and Games"	Next → "A Feasibility Study"

"The Special One" is an episode of the original The Outer Limits television show. It first aired on April 6, 1964, during the first season.

== Introduction ==
A man confronts Mr. Zeno, a mysterious educator who seems to have alienated his son's affections. Mr. Zeno apparently uses his mental ability to make the man jump out of the window against his will.

== Plot ==
Roy Benjamin and his wife, Aggie, are delighted, but puzzled when they meet Mr. Zeno, who explains that he is a government educator sent to cultivate the mind of their gifted son, Kenny. Roy becomes worried, however, when he discovers that Kenny is learning things that are not accepted by earthly science, including a device given to Kenny by Mr. Zeno that has the ability to control weather patterns. When Roy discovers that the government's Educational Enrichment program knows nothing about Mr. Zeno, he confronts the educator, only to discover that he is an alien, re-educating children in a plot to take over the world. Kenny now has super-human knowledge, and even possesses a few mental powers, having seemingly become loyal to the alien. Nonetheless, it is revealed in the end that Kenny knew of Mr. Zeno's plans since the beginning (Zeno having believed children to be more easily impressionable and more gullible than adults), and decided to feign loyalty in order to better thwart them. Managing to render the alien powerless by using the sound-wave-powered weather machine against him, removing the essential element from the atmosphere that would enable his kind to survive on Earth, Kenny forces Mr. Zeno to retreat back to his homeworld, Zenon, thus ruining the alien's plans of conquest.

== Closing narration ==
The mold of a man stems from the mind of a child. Educators and emperors have known this from time immemorial. So have tyrants.

== Cast ==
- Richard Ney – as Mr. Zeno
- Flip Mark – as Kenny Benjamin
- Macdonald Carey – as Roy Benjamin
- Marion Ross – as Agnes "Aggie" Benjamin
- Edward Platt – as Mr. Terrence
- Jason Wingreen – as Bill Turner
- Bert Freed – as Joe Hayden

== Notes ==
This episode has no opening narration.

The pre-title sequence for this episode is not a "teaser" preview of an upcoming scene, but a unique introductory sequence. It was written by Joseph Stefano to lengthen the running time of the show, which came up short.
