= The Inheritors (The Outer Limits) =

- The Outer Limits episodes
- Episode nos.: Season 2 Episodes 10 and 11
- Directed by: James Goldstone
- Story by: Seeleg Lester; Sam Neuman; Ed Adamson
- Teleplay by: Seeleg Lester; Sam Neuman
- Cinematography by: Kenneth Peach
- Production code: 44
- Original air dates: November 21, 1964; November 28, 1964

Guest appearances
- Robert Duvall; Steve Ihnat; Donald Harron; James Shigeta (Part I)

Episode chronology
← Previous "I, Robot"	Next → "Keeper of the Purple Twilight"

"The Inheritors" is the only two-part episode of the original The Outer Limits television show. It comprises the forty-first and forty-second episodes of the show, in the second season. Part I was first aired on November 21, 1964; Part II on November 28, 1964.

== Part I ==
Four U.S. Army soldiers, with nothing in common other than having served in the same combat zone and been shot in the head with bullets cast from fragments of a meteorite, cheat death and begin working on a mysterious project. Intelligence officer Adam Ballard attempts to unravel the mystery behind the strange behavior of the men, who have each attained I.Q.s of over 200.

Opening narration: In the troubled places of the world, the Devil's Hunter finds rare game. For man-made savagery is only the instrument for a secret terror stirring from its dark place of ambush...

Lt. Minns (Steve Ihnat) is shot in the head. Rescued, he is flown to the U.S. and is operated on by American doctors. Adam Ballard (Robert Duvall) watches the operation. Minns begins to show the same brainwave patterns that three other men have shown—each one shot in the head by a bullet made from a meteorite fragment. Ballard explains to his superior (Ted De Corsia) that he believes Earth has been invaded, and that these four men are in league with extraterrestrials. As Ballard investigates, he discovers that the men are building a starship. He also discovers that Minns is recruiting children to take with him on a long trip. All the children are handicapped in some way—blind, deaf/mute, paralyzed in the legs, and so on. Ballard is afraid these helpless children are to be victims of alien abduction. He finds the location where the ship is being built, but the men within are sealed off by a force field that nothing can penetrate.

Closing narration: Man looks up at the stars, and dreams his futile dreams. Child of the universe, his toys are ignorance, his games, fantasy. Not even master of his own fate, it is the Devil's Puppeteer who stretches his fingers to answer the question: What will happen next?

== Part II ==
Opening narration: The Earth, tumbling grain of sand in the darkness of unending space, plays host to a strange and awful guest, unsought, uninvited, possessor of fearsome power, purveyor of dark deed, a relentless traveler on the road to its mysterious goal...

Lt. Minns arrives with the children, and ushers them into the ship, suggesting, "help each other ... learn to help each other". Ballard begs the men to fight the "Charlie" in their heads, turn off the force field, and not kidnap the children. Minns explains the project's purpose. The children are not to be examined, they are to be helped—the alien intelligence behind this project originates from a planet inhabited by a highly advanced, peaceful extraterrestrial civilization that has become sterile and are now unable to perpetuate their species. Therefore, they have chosen several handicapped/disinherited children that would not miss their life on Earth, to become the inheritors of their legacy, and thus they will be taken to a new world, where their handicaps will be healed. Indeed, the special air circulating within the starship has even now begun to heal them. Minns turns off the force field, and invites Ballard inside the ship. Ballard sees what Minns says is true. He exits, and Minns gives the men a choice—stay on Earth or go with him and the children. They elect to leave for a new world and a new life.

Closing narration: The Inheritors are on their way. In a universe of billions of stars, there are places of love and happiness. On this Earth, in this spot, magic settled for a moment. Wonder touched a few lives, and a few odd pieces fell smoothly into the jigsaw of Creation.

== Production ==
Story editor Seeleg Lester was determined to feature a benevolent "invasion" in the story, because, as he says, "Monsters coming to destroy the world is garbage. We had the god-damndest trouble with ABC because they didn't understand the story. I told Ben: 'We'll fight for this. If they want monsters, we'll put in the other shows.' And when ABC saw the final-draft script, they told us, 'You know, this could make a damned good story — let's not fuck it up!' That illustrates the kind of mentality the network had."

Lieutenant Minns' climactic monologue in Part II was improvised by actor Steve Ihnat, based loosely on the original scripted lines. Actress Morgan Brittany later said, "He put it into his own words... not a word-for-word memorization. It just came out so beautifully. To me, it made the whole show... You've never in your life seen crew members so mesmerized. Just silence on the set."

Director James Goldstone had a hard time dramatizing the plywood spaceship rising into the air at the end of the story: "We couldn't do it optically, and didn't have the time or the money to shoot it any other way, so Ken Peach and I just dollied the camera back until we were off the stage, then tilted up to the sky."

== Cast ==
- Robert Duvall – as Adam Ballard
- Donald Harron – as Art Harris
- Steve Ihnat – as Lt. Minns
- Ivan Dixon – as Sgt. James Conover
- Dee Pollock – as PFC Francis Hadley
- James Frawley – as Pvt. Robert Renaldo
- Ted de Corsia – as Randolph E. Branch
- Kim Hector – as Johnny Subiron

=== Part I only ===
- James Shigeta – as AIO Captain Newa
- Dabbs Greer – as E. F. Larkin
- William Winterside (William Wintersole) – as Prof. Andrew Whitsett
- Robert Cinder – as Jessup
- Leon Askin – as Shop Superintendent
- Sy Prescott – as The Guard
- Linda Hutchings – as The Nurse
- Robert J. Nelson – as The Surgeon
- Yoneo Iguchi – as Soldier

=== Part II only ===
- Jan Shutan – as Mrs. Subiron
- Joanne Stuart – as Miss Steen
- Paulle Clark – as Second Nurse
- David Brady – as Danny Masters
- Suzanne Cupito (Morgan Brittany) – as Minerva Gordon
- Jon Cedar – as Grainger
- Charles Herbert – as Boy
- Michel Petit – as Child
- John Harding – as Kid #1
