= Fun and Games (The Outer Limits) =

- The Outer Limits episode
- Episode no.: Season 1 Episode 27
- Directed by: Gerd Oswald
- Story by: Robert Specht
- Teleplay by: Joseph Stefano; Robert Specht
- Cinematography by: Kenneth Peach
- Production code: 28
- Original air date: March 30, 1964

Guest appearances
- Nick Adams; Nancy Malone

Episode chronology
← Previous "The Guests"	Next → "The Special One"

"Fun and Games" is an episode of the original The Outer Limits television show. It first aired on March 30, 1964, during the first season.

== Opening narration ==
There WAS a moment in time when those who were brilliant and powerful also were playful, and when they took recess from their exhausting and magnificent strides toward glory, they replenished their darker passions with fun and games. On the planet Earth, such pastimes have been civilized, and drained of all but their last few drops of blood...

== Plot ==
Mike Benson, ex-boxer and small-time crook, and Laura Hanley, a divorcee, each emotionally wounded by life, are abducted at critical points in their lives by The Senator, a sporting alien representing the citizens of the planet Andera. The Anderans have overcome war, pestilence, avarice and envy, are no longer driven by wants and needs, and find that their lives have become quite stagnant; therefore, they replace their boredom with a constant supply of "fun & games". Mike and Laura are "electroported" to an arena planet where they are to be pitted in mortal combat against two primitive aliens from the Calco galaxy for the entertainment of the jaded audience on Andera. The goal of the tournament is species survival; the home planet of the losing team will be obliterated in a cataclysmic display lasting five years for the further enjoyment of the citizens of Andera. During the combat, Mike and Laura learn to function as a team. When the male Calco alien, having killed its mate to double its own food supply, confronts Mike on a footbridge over a river of lava, Laura kills the creature with its own saw-bladed boomerang. Mike, hanging by his fingertips and weakened by the ordeal, finally falls off the bridge into the lava. Laura, believing Mike to be dead, mourning his passing and praising his efforts in defending the human race from extinction, is informed by The Senator that since the alien perished in the lava first, Mike's life was spared, and they are declared the winners, thus saving Earth. In that split second, they are electroported to safety, unaware of what had transpired and free to resume their mundane lives.

Unusually for this series, this episode featured no closing narration.

== Background ==
Robert Specht's original script titled 'Natural Selection' was slightly different. Here Mike Adams, a computer expert for the U.N., walks through his office door into a black vortex and meets Em, a powerfully-built alien who remains in the darkness unseen. He tells Mike that he is Specimen #172, and that he is to be tested. Mike meets Loris Harper, a medical missionary worker that Em has kept prisoner for two days, and they both fight off a jellyfish monster as their first test. After further tests, he is satisfied they are hardy survivalists.

Em tells them his homeworld is equidistant between Earth and Andera. One planet will have its population exterminated to make room for the overspill from Em's world. Mike and Loris are to fight two Andrites on an arena planet, armed only with pistols that fire explosive charges. The male Andrite kills his partner, and Mike pretends to do the same to lure it out of hiding. Mike trips a snare, is hit by a spear, loses his pistol and falls over the edge of a cliff. As he hangs there bleeding the Andrite emerges and Loris shoots it dead with the pistol Mike dropped. Later, Mike tells Em that his kind could colonize Earth peacefully, believing Em's race is not dissimilar to humans. Em says, "Unfortunately, we are." as he steps into the light, revealing his true appearance; that of an intelligent ape.

Joseph Stefano rewrote 'Natural Selection' as there were too many costly aliens and visual effects called for, and that the testing procedures endured by Mike were too complicated, redundant or riddled with technical gibberish. He also felt Em's revelation as an ape was too similar to the end of another episode, "The Sixth Finger", and that The Outer Limits did not need another Earth take-over story.

The story is very similar to a subsequent Star Trek episode titled "Arena". The plots of both Specht and Stefano's scripts also have elements in common with "Arena", the 1944 short story by Fredric Brown on which the Star Trek episode is based; it may have inspired Specht's story, but Stefano had not read it.

The Calco Alien mask (without its bulging eyes) and the taloned hands, made by Projects Unlimited, were reused (with an added hairy bodysuit) in the Star Trek pilot "The Cage". When Captain Pike attempts to strangle the Keeper he causes Pike to hallucinate that he is strangling a ferocious hairy alien instead (the creature is also seen in another cage near Pike's when he first awakes in captivity).

This episode has no closing narration.

== Cast ==
- Nick Adams – as Mike Benson
- Nancy Malone – as Laura Hanley
- Ray Kellogg – as Detective
- Bill Hart – as Calco Galaxy Alien
- Robert Johnson – as The Senator (voice)
- Read Morgan – as Poker Dealer (uncredited)
- Theodore Marcuse – as Poker Player (uncredited) / The Senator (uncredited)
- Harvey Gardner – as Sharpie (uncredited)
- Charles MacQuarry – as Female Calco Galaxy Alien (uncredited)
- Charles Horvath – as Player #1 (uncredited)
- Jack Perkins – as Player #2 (uncredited)
- Buzz Henry – as Player #3 (uncredited)
- NOTE: Theodore Marcuse played The Senator during the production of this episode; the character is only ever seen on camera in deep shadow in alien costuming. However, Marcuse's vocal performance was deemed inadequate, and Robert Johnson was called upon to dub all of The Senator's lines. Only Johnson receives credit on the finished episode.

== Production ==
Fun and Games was another episode that, when assembled, ran short of the standard running time. In this case Joseph Stefano was able to stretch the minimal footage, shot by Gerd Oswald, in the editing suite at KTTV. Thanks to the plot, which keeps jumping back to the murder of the Poker Dealer, Mike's frantic search for a place to hide in Laura's apartment building is seen three times, and many of the shots on the Arena planet are seen twice. When Laura is "electroported" the second time it is the same footage used for her first trip.

MGM's Backlot #3, the Tarzan Forest, was used for the exterior shots of the arena planet.
