= The Outer Limits (1995 TV series) =

American-Canadian science fiction anthology television series (1995–2002)

- Opening title (2002)
- Genre: Science fiction; Dark fantasy; Horror; Drama; Mystery fiction; Suspense
- Starring: Various
- Narrated by: Kevin Conway (Control Voice)
- Music by: John Van Tongeren; Daryl Bennett; Jim Guttridge
- Countries of origin: United States; Canada
- No. of seasons: 7
- No. of episodes: 152 (list of episodes)

Production
- Production locations: Vancouver, British Columbia; Victoria, British Columbia
- Running time: 43–44 minutes
- Production companies: Alliance Atlantis Communications; Atlantis Films; Showtime Networks; Trilogy Entertainment Group; CFCF-TV; CanWest Global Communications; Global Television Network; The Movie Network; SuperChannel; MGM Television

Original release
- Network: Showtime
- Release: March 26, 1995 – September 3, 2000
- Network: Sci Fi
- Release: March 16, 2001 – January 18, 2002

The Outer Limits is a science fiction anthology television series that originally aired between 1995 and 2002 on Showtime, Syfy, Channel 7 and in syndication. The series is a revival of the original The Outer Limits series that aired from 1963 to 1965.

The Outer Limits is an anthology of distinct story episodes, sometimes with a plot twist at the end. The revival series maintained an anthology format but occasionally featured recurring story arcs that were then tied together during season-finale clip shows.

== History ==
After an attempt to bring back The Outer Limits during the early 1980s, it was finally relaunched in 1995. The success of television speculative fiction such as Star Trek: The Next Generation and The X-Files and anthology shows such as Tales from the Crypt convinced rights holder Metro-Goldwyn-Mayer to revive The Outer Limits. A deal was made with Trilogy Entertainment Group, the company behind such cinema hits as Backdraft and Robin Hood: Prince of Thieves. The show would run on the pay-TV channel Showtime (Trilogy, a Los Angeles and Canada-based company, is credited with creating the 1995 series).

The episodes appeared in syndication the following season (the same arrangement as MGM/Showtime series Stargate SG-1 and Poltergeist: The Legacy). It continued on Showtime until 2001, when Sci-Fi quietly took over production for the seventh and final season. As a result, that season, unlike the previous ones, was completely free of any swearing or nudity. It was canceled in 2002, after a total of 152 episodes – far more than the original incarnation of the show. In the revived show, the Control Voice was supplied by Kevin Conway. The new series distanced itself from the "monster of the week" mandate that had characterized the original series from its inception; while there were plenty of aliens and monsters, they dramatized a specific scientific concept and its effect on humanity. Examples of this include "Dark Rain" (biochemical warfare causing worldwide sterility), "Final Exam" (discovery of practical cold fusion power), "A Stitch in Time" (a time traveler tinkers with history), as well as two episodes ("Unnatural Selection" and "Criminal Nature") revolving around a human mutation known as Genetic Rejection Syndrome (humans mutating into violent creatures) as a result of an outlawed eugenics attempt to create superior children.

== Production ==
The series was filmed in Vancouver, British Columbia, and Victoria, British Columbia. Stories by Harlan Ellison, A. E. van Vogt, Eando Binder, Richard Matheson, Larry Niven, Stephen King, George R.R. Martin and James Patrick Kelly were adapted.

Leslie Stevens was a program consultant for the first four seasons (until his death), while Joseph Stefano –creator, producer, and head writer of the original Outer Limits TV series– served as an executive consultant and later senior advisor throughout the whole series. Stefano also remade his episode "A Feasibility Study", retitling it "Feasibility Study" for the third season. John Van Tongeren and Mark Mancina composed new music different from that of Dominic Frontiere and Harry Lubin. John Van Tongeren scored ten episodes for the first season and continued through season 6. The musical theme for the modern Outer Limits series is credited to John Van Tongeren and Mark Mancina.

In most seasons, there was a clip show that intertwined the plots of several of the show's episodes (see "The Voice of Reason" for an example). At each commercial interval, the Control Voice can be heard saying "The Outer Limits... please stand by". "Please Stand By" had been the planned title for the original series, (probably to match the opening credits' "There is nothing wrong with your television...")

A number of episodes from seasons 1–6 feature nudity and other adult content. Though originally broadcast uncensored, those episodes have been edited for commercial syndication.

== Episodes ==
| Season | Episodes | Originally released | | |
| Season | Episodes | First released | Last released | Network |
|---|---|---|---|---|
| 1 | 21 | March 26, 1995 | August 20, 1995 | Showtime |
| 2 | 22 | January 14, 1996 | August 4, 1996 | Showtime |
| 3 | 18 | January 19, 1997 | July 25, 1997 | Showtime |
| 4 | 26 | January 23, 1998 | December 18, 1998 | Showtime |
| 5 | 22 | January 22, 1999 | August 20, 1999 | Showtime |
| 6 | 21 | January 21, 2000 | September 3, 2000 | Showtime |
| 7 | 22 | March 16, 2001 | January 18, 2002 | Sci Fi |

== Home media ==
Between 2002 and 2006, six themed DVD anthologies of The Outer Limits, with six episodes each, were released by MGM in the United States: Aliens Among Us, Death & Beyond, Fantastic Androids & Robots, Mutation & Transformation, Sex & Science Fiction, and Time Travel & Infinity. These DVDs all contain the original uncut episodes, as originally aired, and were collected in a box set, The Outer Limits: The New Series (2006). The Aliens & Sex titles were also released by MGM in the United Kingdom and Benelux (2005).

- Aliens Among Us (US release)
  - S01E13: "Quality of Mercy"
  - S02E15: "Afterlife"
  - S05E04: "The Grell"
  - S04E06: "Relativity Theory"
  - S07E09: "Alien Shop"
  - S02E06: "Beyond the Veil"
- Aliens Among Us (UK release)
  - S01E01: "The Sandkings" (Parts 1 and 2)
  - S02E04: "I Hear You Calling"
  - S01E20: "Birthright"
  - S01E04: "The Second Soul"
  - S01E09: "Corner of the Eye"
- Death & Beyond
  - S01E04: "The Second Soul"
  - S05E05: "The Other Side"
  - S03E11: "New Lease"
  - S05E18: "Essence of Life"
  - S07E22: "Human Trials"
  - S04E25: "Black Box"
- Fantastic Androids & Robots
  - S01E18: "I, Robot"
  - S04E02: "The Hunt"
  - S02E02: "Resurrection"
  - S03E07: "The Camp"
  - S06E12: "Glitch"
  - S05E03: "Small Friends"
- Mutation & Transformation
  - S01E14: "The New Breed"
  - S05E14: "Descent"
  - S04E13: "The Joining"
  - S03E12: "Double Helix"
  - S06E02: "The Gun"
  - S05E17: "The Inheritors"
- Sex & Science Fiction (US release)
  - S01E16: "Caught in the Act"
  - S03E01: "Bits of Love"
  - S01E02: "Valerie 23"
  - S05E07: "The Human Operators"
  - S06E03: "Skin Deep"
  - S07E12: "Flower Child"
- Sex & Science Fiction (UK release)
  - S01E16: "Caught in the Act"
  - S03E01: "Bits of Love"
  - S01E02: "Valerie 23"
  - S03E04: "The Last Supper"
  - S02E13: "From Within"
  - S01E14: "The New Breed"
- Time Travel & Infinity
  - S02E01: "A Stitch in Time"
  - S05E12: "Tribunal"
  - S06E17: "Gettysburg"
  - S07E15: "Time to Time"
  - S05E16: "Déjà Vu"
  - S07E02: "Patient Zero"

Season 1 was released uncut and with extra features on DVD in the US (MGM, 2005), UK (20th Century Fox, 2007), and Germany (Fox/MGM, 2008). Because sales of the set did not meet expectations, no further seasons were released.

In 2010, Canada's Alliance Home Entertainment released all seven seasons on DVD. Season 1 mirrored the content of the earlier MGM set, while season 2 was also uncensored, with the exception of one episode, "Paradise". Seasons 3–6 all contain numerous censored episodes, and Season 7 contains the original unedited episodes; unlike the previous seasons, it was produced with no nudity or swearing.

In 2013, TGG Direct released the seventh season in the US, again unedited but of marginally inferior visual quality than the Alliance season 7 DVDs. The 5-disc set is titled The Outer Limits: The Complete Final Season, and, in 2014, it was split and re-released as a 3-disc Volume One and 2-disc Volume Two sets.

| DVD name | Ep# | Release date |
|---|---|---|
| The Complete First Season | 22 | May 4, 2010 |
| The Complete Second Season | 22 | May 4, 2010 |
| The Complete Third Season | 18 | June 1, 2010 |
| The Complete Fourth Season | 26 | July 6, 2010 |
| The Complete Fifth Season | 22 | August 3, 2010 |
| The Complete Sixth Season | 22 | September 7, 2010 |
| The Complete Seventh Season (final) | 22 | October 5, 2010 |

| DVD name | Ep# | Release date |
|---|---|---|
| The Final Season | 22 | December 3, 2013 |

Until June 2020, all seven seasons of the series were available on Hulu, until January 2021 and selectively edited on Amazon Video, and seasons 1–7 are selectively edited on "The Roku Channel" on Roku devices.

All seven seasons are on MGM+, although season 2 is missing episodes 5 ("Mind Over Matter"), 19 ("Falling Star"), and 21 ("Vanishing Act"). These three episodes are included on "The Roku Channel".

== Tie-in books ==
Between 1996 and 1997, Prima Publishing published three books which served as compilations of mostly prose adaptations for episodes from the 1963 and 1995 series.

Between 1997 and 1999, a series of books based on the show but aimed towards younger readers was published by Tor Books, penned by genre fiction author John Peel. The first, The Zanti Misfits, was a loose adaptation of the eponymous 1963 series episode, while the second was based on the episode The Choice from the new series. The other ten books were original stories.

1. The Zanti Misfits
2. The Choice
3. The Time Shifter
4. The Lost
5. The Invaders
6. The Innocent
7. The Vanished
8. The Nightmare
9. Beware the Metal Children
10. Alien Invasion from Hollyweird
11. The Payback
12. The Change

Author Stan Timmons also wrote two tie-in original novels in 2003 entitled Always Darkest and Dark Matters, respectively.

== Other media ==
An MMO for the reboot was planned under the title The Outer Limits On-Line. MGM was working with Worlds Inc.

In 2014, it was reported that a feature film directed by Scott Derrickson based on the series was in development. In April 2019, a revival was in the works at a premium cable network.

== Theme park attractions ==
Two identical indoor roller coasters named The Outer Limits: Flight of Fear opened in 1996 at Paramount's Kings Dominion in Richmond, Virginia, and Paramount's Kings Island in Cincinnati, Ohio. Loosely based on several episodes of The Outer Limits, both rides are heavily themed to an alien invasion, with riders entering the fictional Federal Bureau of Paranormal Activity and eventually boarding an alien ship. The Outer Limits theming was removed in 2001 when Paramount chose not to renew the license, and the trains were overhauled with lap bars that year. Although the Paramount Parks were purchased by Cedar Fair Entertainment Company in 2006, both rides continue to operate with most of their original theming still intact, minus the Outer Limits branding.

== See also ==
- The Outer Limits (1963 TV series)
- List of The Outer Limits (1963 TV series) episodes
- Science fiction on television
