= The Premonition (The Outer Limits) =

- The Outer Limits episode
- Episode no.: Season 2 Episode 16
- Directed by: Gerd Oswald
- Story by: Ib Melchior
- Teleplay by: Sam Roeca; Ib Melchior
- Cinematography by: Kenneth Peach
- Production code: 47
- Original air date: January 9, 1965

Guest appearances
- Dewey Martin; Mary Murphy

Episode chronology
← Previous "The Brain of Colonel Barham"	Next → "The Probe"

"The Premonition" is an episode of the television show The Outer Limits. It first aired on January 9, 1965, during the second season.

== Opening narration ==
On the fabulous spawning grounds of Man's ever-increasing knowledge of science and technology, ancient, half-forgotten legends seemingly have no place. Except one: The legend of the Gordian Knot, a knot so intricate and convoluted that no man could untie it. For there are problems so perplexing that they are seemingly impossible to solve, when Man ventures to the outer limits of his experience...

== Plot ==
Jim Darcy, the pilot of an X-15 rocket-powered research aircraft, and his wife, Linda, become trapped 10 seconds ahead of their time, enabling them to watch time unfold to catch up with them at the rate of about one second every 30 minutes. In the time left before returning to synch with normal time, they see that their daughter, Janie, is about to be hit by a rolling military truck whose parking brake had not been set. Jim and Linda's inability to move objects in the "real" world prevents them from resetting the truck's parking brake or pulling young Janie out of danger. Their problem is aggravated as they soon learn that at the moment when time "catches up" with them, they must assume the exact positions they had been in five hours earlier, when this whole thing started, or they could remain in that state forever.

They meet an unnamed and seemingly malevolent individual (the "Limbo Being") who earlier experienced the same situation, but failed to make it back in time. When it reveals that it could take from them their chances to return to reality Jim and Linda come to see just how grave their situation is: one or both could end up being stuck in this state forever.

On discovering that he can move and manipulate items in the crashed plane and car, Jim hits upon a way to save his daughter from death. He removes seatbelts from his wife's car and ties them to the back wheel of the menacing truck. He then ties the other end around the brake lever so that the truck's brakes will engage the moment the time warp ends. (It was, by that time, moving at 10 mph.)

With no time to spare, they hurry back to the crash site and assume their original positions. When time catches up the seatbelt pulls the emergency brake, stopping the truck. Their daughter is safe, and the world returns to normal. Jim and Linda have no recollection of their time in the limbo state, however they both feel compelled to check on their daughter as soon as possible. Jim commandeers a nearby jeep and they rush back to find their daughter safe and sound. When they each wonder why they needed to return so quickly, Jim remarked that he had a "premonition", to which Linda replied "So did I".

== Closing narration ==
Man is forever solving the most perplexing problems as he ventures ever further into the unknown. But where are the outer limits of his ingenuity? Will he ever encounter a problem, a Gordian Knot, which he cannot ultimately cut?

== Cast ==
- Dewey Martin – Jim Darcy
- Mary Murphy – Linda Darcy
- William Bramley – General Baldwin
- Dorothy Green – Matron
- Emma Tyson – Janie Darcy
- Kay Kuter – "Limbo Being"
- Coby Denton – Gate Sentry

== Production notes ==
- Many effects were used to keep even the slightest movement by the actors and extras from being noticed such as: still photographs, two-dimensional life-sized cardboard cutouts and split screen effects where one half of the screen was a freeze frame and the other incorporated movement.
- This episode's original title was "Gordian Knot". The Gordian Knot is a legend associated with Alexander the Great. It is often used as a metaphor for an intractable problem, solved by a bold stroke.
- The X-15 accident footage used in this episode occurred 5 November 1959 when a small engine fire forced pilot Scott Crossfield to make an emergency landing on Rosamond Dry Lake, Edwards AFB, California, in 56-6671. Not designed to land with fuel on board, the test craft came down with a heavy load of propellants and broke its back, grounding this particular X-15 for three months.
