= The Duplicate Man =

- The Outer Limits episode
- Episode no.: Season 2 Episode 13
- Directed by: Gerd Oswald
- Story by: Clifford Simak
- Teleplay by: Robert C. Dennis
- Cinematography by: Kenneth Peach
- Production code: 45
- Original air date: December 19, 1964

Guest appearances
- Ron Randell; Constance Towers

Episode chronology
← Previous "Keeper of the Purple Twilight"	Next → "Counterweight"

"The Duplicate Man" is an episode of the original The Outer Limits television show. It was first aired on December 19, 1964, during the second season.

== Opening narration ==
Since the first day that Man stared up at the stars and saw other worlds, there has been no more haunting question than this: What will we find there? Will there be other creatures, and will they be like us? Or when that ancient dream comes true, will it turn into a nightmare? Will we find, on some distant, frozen planet, an alien life of unimaginable horror?

== Plot ==
It is the year 2025; fourteen years previously in 2011 wealthy research academic Henderson James had Captain Karl Emmet smuggle a Megasoid to Earth. It is illegal to possess a Megasoid as they are highly dangerous, always thinking about killing, unless in a reproductive cycle, which this one now is. When the Megasoid escapes to hide amongst the stuffed exhibits at a nearby space zoo, James, lacking the courage to track it down and kill it himself, has a clone of himself illegally made for the purpose by clone bootlegger Basil Jerichau. Strict guidelines govern the production of these "duplicates", which must be destroyed before vestigial memory renders them indistinguishable from the originals.

The clone botches its mission at the zoo and the Megasoid gets away after informing the clone that he is a duplicate. A trace of memory leads the duplicate James to the home of Captain Emmet. Emmet panics and tries to phone the police; the duplicate James knocks him out cold; and, accumulating more of the real Henderson James’ memories as he goes, he finds his way to "his" own home. The wounded Megasoid returns to the James home and hides in the bushes. Duplicate James meets the real James’ wife, Laura, who sees in him a more youthful version of her husband before he became obsessed with studying the Megasoid. The real James has gone to bribe Emmet into killing the duplicate James once he has completed his mission. Returning home, he leaves Emmett on the grounds to await duplicate James’ arrival. Unfortunately, Emmett is attacked and killed by the Megasoid. Entering his home, the real James meets his duplicate. Seeing a more compassionate version of himself gives him the courage to kill the alien, as he believes Laura would be happier with the duplicate.

Henderson James and his duplicate hunt for the Megasoid. James shoots the alien after it has torn his duplicate apart. He discovers that his clone was dying all the time, from a timed release of poison into his blood stream; a precaution provided by the clone bootlegger. A less cynical Henderson James is now reconciled with his wife.

== Closing narration ==
In all the universe, can there be creatures more strange than the species called Man? He creates and destroys; he fumbles and makes mistakes. But the thing which distinguishes him is his ability to learn from his mistakes.

== Background ==
Adapted from the short story "Goodnight, Mr James" by Clifford D. Simak, first published in Galaxy Science Fiction magazine in March 1951, later published as "The Night of the Puudly" in 1964 in a collection of Simak's short stories. The original story begins and ends with the "duplicate" of Henderson James, who awakes on a street in an unnamed city with a mission to kill an alien called a Puudly. Using telepathy the Puudly informs "duplicate" James of his origins as a clone, before James kills it. James then decides to attempt to talk the real Henderson James into letting him live. The clone of James arrives at Henderson James' home just after the gardener (whose job it is to kill the clone) has mistakenly killed the real James instead. As the duplicate prepares to become the real James, he receives a phone call from Allen, the clone bootlegger, who advises him of the poison: "Like a time bomb. No antidote for it even if he found out somehow." The duplicate says "It was good of you to let me know." Allen replies, "Glad to, Goodnight, Mr. James." (source - The Outer Limits: The Official Companion (1986), page 343.)

The Chemosphere House in Los Angeles was used in exterior shots as the home of the character Captain Emmet.

Star Ron Randell recently had been featured in The Most Dangerous Man Alive.

== Cast ==
- Ron Randell as Henderson James and his clone
- Sean McClory as Captain Karl Emmet
- Constance Towers as Laura James
- Mike Lane as the Megasoid
- Alan Gifford as Zoo Guide
- Konstantin Shayne as Murdock
- Jeffery Stone as Policeman
- Steven Geray as Basil Jerichau
- Ivy Bethune as Miss Thorson
- Jonathon Hole as Pedestrian
- George Robotham as Sean McClory's stunt double
- George Paul as Ron Randell's stunt double
