= Gail Kobe =

American actress and producer (1932–2013)

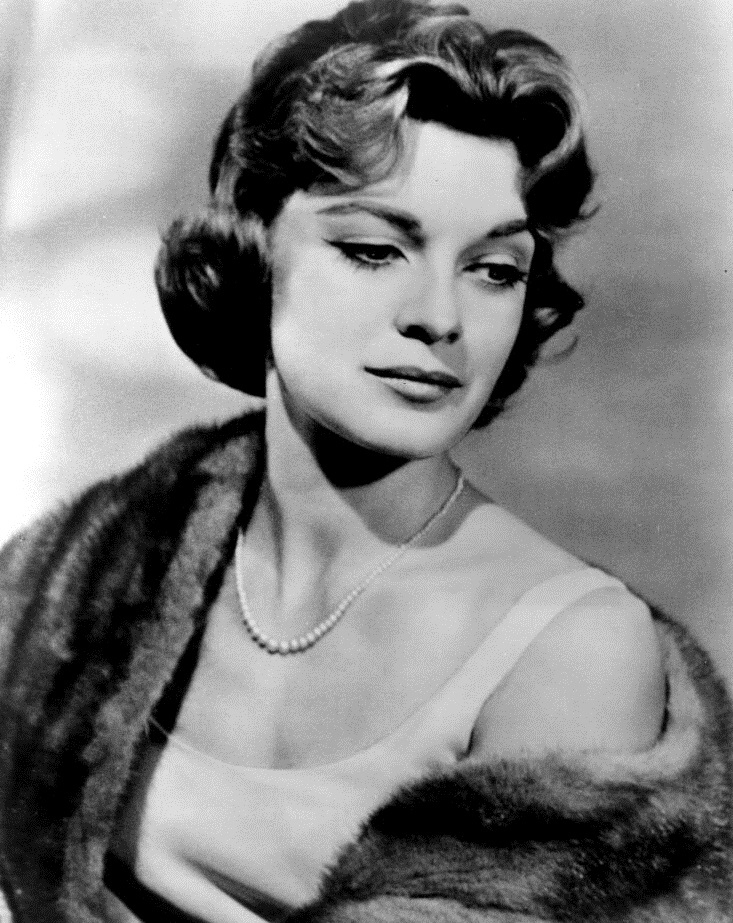
- Kobe in 1959
- Born: Gabriella Kieliszewski; March 19, 1932; Hamtramck, Michigan, U.S.
- Died: August 1, 2013 (aged 81); Woodland Hills, California
- Education: UCLA
- Occupations: Actress, television producer
- Years active: 1955–1988
- Spouse(s): Richard I. Kramer (April 26, 1957–19??); Edward S. Lees (1971–1972; divorced)

Gail Kobe (born Gabriella Kieliszewski; March 19, 1932 – August 1, 2013) was an American actress and television producer.

== Early years ==
Kobe was born Gabriella Kieliszewski in Hamtramck, Michigan (within Detroit), the younger child of Benjamin and Theresa Kieliszewski, who later Americanized their surname. She had one sibling, an older sister, Beatrice (later Mrs. Walter Adamski), who predeceased her. Kobe graduated from UCLA earning a fine arts degree in theatre and dance. Kobe had polio as a child and began dancing as a form of therapy. A heart murmur that she developed in her high school years caused her to cease dancing. She graduated from Hamtramck High School.

== Early career ==
Kobe portrayed Penny Adams on the TV series Trackdown. She appeared on the Alcoa Theatre in a 1958 episode titled "Disappearance", starring Jack Lemmon and Joan Blackman. In 1965, she portrayed Doris Schuster on TV's Peyton Place. She also appeared on daytime television in the NBC serial Bright Promise as Ann Boyd Jones (1970–1972).

During the 1950s and 1960s, Kobe made guest appearances on Highway Patrol ("The Search"), The O. Henry Playhouse ("The Guilty Party"), The Californians, The Rebel, Mackenzie's Raiders, Blue Light, Felony Squad, Ironside, The Outer Limits, Richard Diamond, Private Detective, The Fugitive, Bourbon Street Beat, Maverick, M Squad (four episodes), Whirlybirds, Perry Mason, Hogan's Heroes, The Twilight Zone ("In His Image", "The Self-Improvement of Salvadore Ross", "A World of Difference"), Dr. Kildare, Empire, Gunsmoke (S3E25 "Dirt", S10E26 “Bank Baby”, S12E13 "The Moonstone", and S14E23 "The Intruder"), Cheyenne, Daniel Boone, Mission: Impossible, The Untouchables, Have Gun – Will Travel, The Mod Squad, The Alfred Hitchcock Hour, Bewitched, and Mannix. In 1962, she portrayed Dr. Louise Amadon in the episode "A Woman's Place" on Rawhide, about a woman doctor's struggles against stereotypes in the Old West. In 1963 she appeared in Combat! as Francoise.

On February 17, 1959, Kobe was cast in the episode "Disaster Town" of the series Rescue 8 in the role of Ellen Mason, a mother looking for her son in a western ghost town.

In the series, Laramie, Kobe played a saloon girl in the episode "Gun Duel" (aired December 25, 1962).

== Later career ==
Kobe began to work behind the camera as supervising producer and associate producer on such daytime programs as CBS's The Edge of Night and NBC's Return to Peyton Place. From 1981 to 1982, its final year on the air, Kobe became executive producer of the NBC soap opera, Texas. From 1983 to May 1986, she was the executive producer of CBS's Guiding Light (for which she was nominated for a Daytime Emmy Award) and then served as a producer on CBS's The Bold and the Beautiful from its debut in 1987 through the early 1990s.

Kobe taught drama at San Fernando Valley State College.

Kobe was a member of St. Louis Church. She volunteered many hours to Eisenhower Medical Center and the Palm Springs Art Museum while she lived in Palm Springs. While she resided at the Motion Picture Television Fund Home in Woodland Hills, California, she organized the program, We've Got Mail, which airs on cable Channel 22.

== Honors ==
In 2008, a Golden Palm Star on the Walk of Stars was dedicated in Kobe's honor.

== Death ==
For the last two years of her life, the twice-married Kobe resided at the Motion Picture & Television Country House and Hospital in Woodland Hills. She died on August 1, 2013, aged 81, from undisclosed causes.

== Filmography ==
Year	Title	Role	Notes
1955	East of Eden	Student	Uncredited
1956	Alfred Hitchcock Presents	Jessie Bridges	Season 2 Episode 9: "Crack of Doom"
1956	The Ten Commandments	Pretty Slave Girl	
1956	Highway Patrol	Susan Keefe	Season 2 Episode 1: "The Search"
1956–1958	Cheyenne	Della Sevier	(1) Season 2 Episode 4: "The Bounty Killers" (1956) (2) Season 3 Episode 16: "The Long Search" (1958)
1957–1958	Trackdown	(1) Beth Waislip (2) (3) (4) (5) Penny Adams (6) Cindy	(1) Season 1 Episode 1: "The Marple Brothers" (1957) (2) Season 1 Episode 23: "The House" (1958) (3) Season 1 Episode 24: "The Boy" (1958) (4) Season 1 Episode 25: "The Pueblo Kid" (1958) (5) Season 1 Episode 29: "The Jailbreak" (1958) (6) Season 2 Episode 12: "Sunday's Child" (1958)
1957–1959	Whirlybirds	(1) Mary (2) Alice	(1) Season 1 Episode 4: "Fire Flight" (1957) (2) Season 3 Episode 16: "In Ways Mysterious" (1959)
1958	Gunsmoke in Tucson	Katy Porter	
1958–1964	Perry Mason	(1) Margo, Drake's Secretary (2) Gertrude Lewis	(1) Season 1 Episode 20: "The Case of the Lonely Heiress" (1958) (2) Season 7 Episode 14: "The Case of the Accosted Accountant" (1964)
1958–1969	Gunsmoke	(1) Polly Troyman (2) Bar Girl Madge (3) Ellie Decker	(1) Season 3 Episode 25: "Dirt" (1958) (2) Season 12 Episode 13: "The Moonstone" (1966) (3) Season 14 Episode 23: "The Intruder" (1969)
1959	Wagon Train	Erika Hennepin	Season 2 Episode 28: "The Vincent Eaglewood Story"
1959	Frontier Doctor	Pauline Lanyon	Episode: "Superstition Mountain"
1959	Mackenzie's Raiders	Wanda West	Season 1 Episode 35: "Captured in Mexico"
1960	Tales of Wells Fargo	Kate Brown	Season 4 Episode 25: "The Late Mayor Brown"
1960–1964	The Twilight Zone	(1) Sally (2) Jessica Connelly (3) Leah Maitland	(1) Season 1 Episode 23: "A World of Difference" (1960) (2) Season 4 Episode 1: "In His Image" (1963) (3) Season 5 Episode 16: "The Self-Improvement of Salvadore Ross" (1964)
1962	The Alfred Hitchcock Hour	Virginia Morrison Carlin	Season 1 Episode 9: "The Black Curtain"
1962	Maverick	Theodora Rush	Season 5 Episode 10: "Marshal Maverick"
1962–1963	Rawhide	(1) Dr. Louise Amadon (2) Agnes Quintle	(1) Season 4 Episode 25: "A Woman's Place" (1962) (2) Season 5 Episode 20: "Incident of Judgment Day" (1963)
1962–1963	Laramie	(1) Lottie Harris (2) Madge	(1) Season 4 Episode 12: "Gun Duel" (1962) (2) Season 4 Episode 20: "The Dispossessed" (1963)
1963	The Virginian	Ruth Ferris	Season 2 Episode 9: "Run Quiet"
1963	Combat!	Francois	Season 1 Episode 28: "The Sniper"
1963	Have Gun – Will Travel	Francine	Season 6 Episode 30: "Two Plus One"
1963	77 Sunset Strip	Diana Carmichael	Season 6 Episode 12: "The Fumble"
1964	The Outer Limits	(1) Janet Doweling (2) Janet Lane	(1) Season 1 Episode 22: "Specimen: Unknown" (2) Season 2 Episode 12: "Keeper of the Purple Twilight"
1967	Mission: Impossible	Lisa Goren	Season 1 Episode 18: "The Trial"
1967	Hogan's Heroes	Lilli von Scheider	Season 3 Episode 3: "D-Day at Stalag 13"
1968	The Mod Squad	Donna	Season 1 Episode 8: "The Price of Terror"
1969	Bewitched	Evelyn Tucker	Season 5 Episode 22: "Going Ape"
1969–1974	Mannix	(1) Katherine Martin (2) Ginny Freeman	(1) Season 2 Episode 25: "To Catch a Rabbit" (1969) (2) Season 8 Episode 12: "A Choice of Victims" (1974)
