= Production and Decay of Strange Particles =

- The Outer Limits episode
- Episode no.: Season 1 Episode 30
- Directed by: Leslie Stevens
- Written by: Leslie Stevens
- Cinematography by: Kenneth Peach
- Production code: 30
- Original air date: April 20, 1964

Guest appearances
- George Macready; Rudy Solari; Joseph Ruskin; Leonard Nimoy; Signe Hasso; Robert Fortier

Episode chronology
← Previous "A Feasibility Study"	Next → "The Chameleon"

"Production and Decay of Strange Particles" is an episode of the original The Outer Limits television show. It first aired on April 20, 1964, during the first season.

In a nuclear research plant, although the workers wear radiation suits, they are taken over by some odd glowing substance. It fills their suits and causes them to act like puppets.

The episode mentions many modern physics concepts such as neutrinos, antimatter, quasi-stellar objects (at that time just discovered and perhaps mentioned here in TV fiction for the first time) and subatomic particles with the property of "strangeness" (a quantum property of matter which had been named only a few years before by physicists, despite objection at the time that it was no more "strange" or odd than any other property of subatomic particles). The episode name echoes a Physical Review paper of 1956, titled "Cloud-Chamber Study of the Production and Decay of Strange Particles."

== Opening narration ==
In recent years, nuclear physicists have discovered a strange world of subatomic particles, fragments of atoms smaller than the imagination can picture, fragments of materials which do not obey the laws of gravity. Antimatter composed of inside-out material; shadow-matter that can penetrate ten miles of lead shielding. Hidden deep in the heart of strange new elements are secrets beyond human understanding – new powers, new dimensions, worlds within worlds, unknown.

== Plot ==
Whilst experimenting on subatomic particles using waldos, researchers inadvertently start a chain reaction that seemingly controls the researchers themselves. Scientist after scientist is subsumed, turned into what at first appear to be nuclear 'zombies' by a mass of sentient particles from another dimension. The truth however, is more terrible, for when one turns to face a colleague who has entered the hot zone to investigate, its faceplate displays naught but television snow... The still-human survivors in the lab fear they may be powerless to stop the eerily controlled chain reaction. Just as the ever-expanding particles are about to engulf the lab itself, the head of the research facility in a deux ex machina calculates a formula which reverses the effects of the reaction, incorporates a random element, and neutralizes the subatomic but sentient lifeform that had abruptly gained entry into our world.

== Closing narration ==
As Man explores the secrets of the universe, strange and inscrutable powers await him. And whether these powers are to become forces of destruction or forces of construction will ultimately depend upon simple but profound human qualities: Inspiration. Integrity. Courage.

== Cast ==
- George Macready – as Dr Marshall
- Signe Hasso – as Laurel Marshall
- Joseph Ruskin – as Collins
- Robert Fortier – as Paul Pollard
- Allyson Ames – as Arndis Pollard
- Rudy Solari – as Griffin
- Leonard Nimoy – as Konig
- Barry Russo – as Terrell
- Willard Sage – as Coulter
- Paul Lukather – as Official
