= Joseph Ruskin =

American actor (1924–2013)

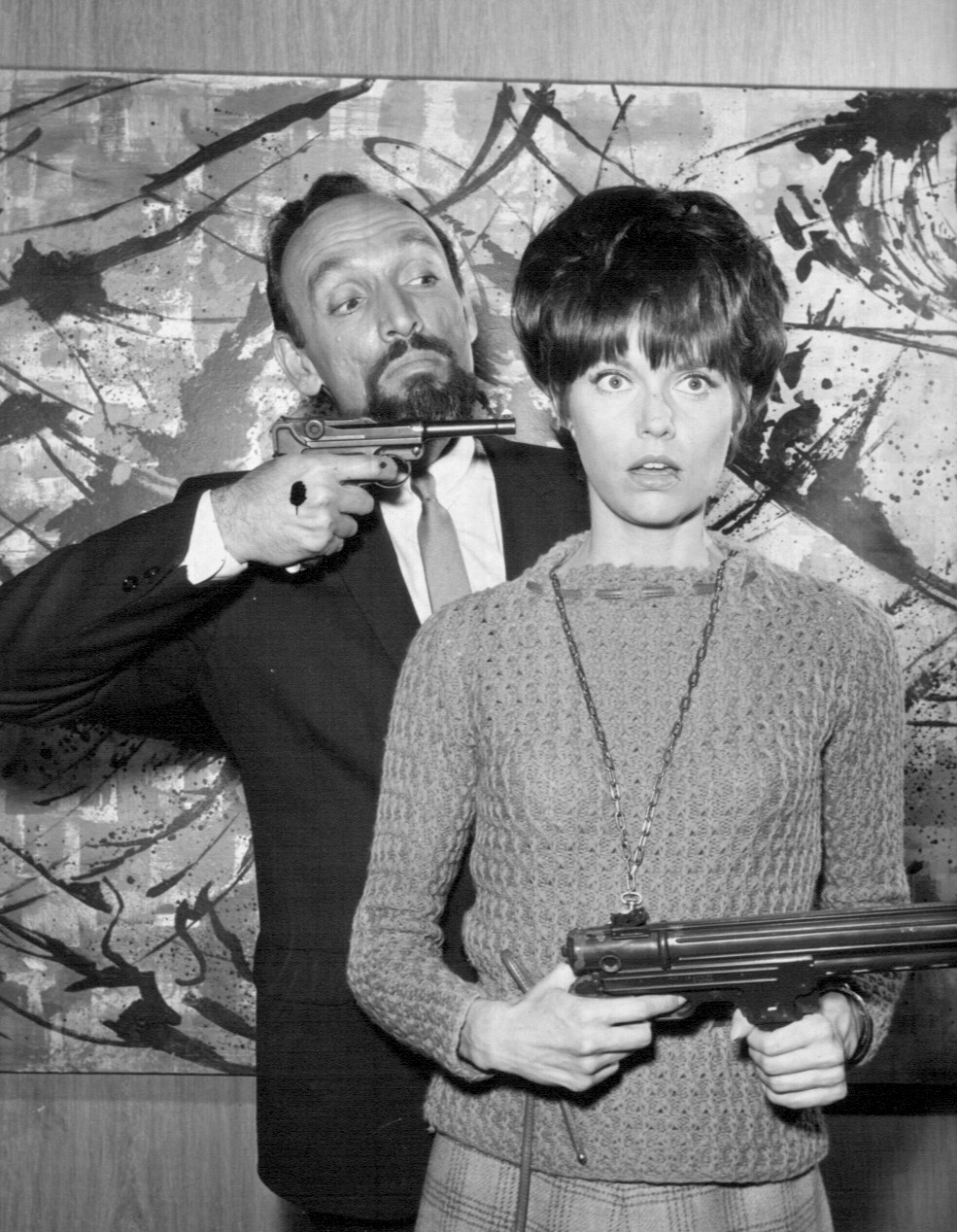
- Ruskin and Barbara Feldon in an episode of Get Smart
- Born: Joseph Richard Schlafman; April 14, 1924; Haverhill, Massachusetts, U.S.
- Died: December 28, 2013 (aged 89); Santa Monica, California, U.S.
- Occupation: Actor
- Years active: 1955–2013

Joseph Ruskin (born Joseph Richard Schlafman; April 14, 1924 – December 28, 2013) was an American character actor.

== Early life ==
Ruskin was born in Haverhill, Massachusetts. After graduating high school in Cleveland, he served in the U.S. Navy and studied drama at Carnegie Mellon University, and began acting at the Pittsburgh Playhouse. Although he gained his greatest recognition in television and film, he continued to appear on stage throughout his career. He was Jewish.

== Career ==
Ruskin appeared in an episode of The Outer Limits, called "Production and Decay of Strange Particles". He played in The Time Tunnel episode "Revenge of the Gods", as well as two separate, two-part Mission: Impossible episodes—"Old Man Out" and "The Slave"—as well as the episodes "The Brothers" and "The Puppet". He had a non-credited role as the voice of the Kanamits in The Twilight Zone episode "To Serve Man", a season after playing the genie in another episode, "The Man in the Bottle". Ruskin also appeared in the Hogan's Heroes episode "The Gestapo Takeover". He played the gun-slinging troublemaker Gus Vogel in the Wanted: Dead or Alive season 2 "Reckless." which aired 11/6/1959. In 1960, Ruskin appeared as Reed Benton in the TV western series Lawman in the episode titled "The Escape of Joe Killmer". In 1964, he appeared in an episode of the comedy-drama Kentucky Jones.

His film appearances include The Magnificent Seven (1960), Prizzi's Honor (1985), Indecent Proposal (1993) and Smokin' Aces (2006).

=== Star Trek ===
In Star Trek: The Original Series, Ruskin played the part of Galt in "The Gamesters of Triskelion", an episode of the second season, originally aired on January 5, 1968.

He appeared in Star Trek: Deep Space Nine, portraying the Klingon Tumek in two episodes, "The House of Quark" and "Looking for par'Mach in All the Wrong Places", which aired in October 1994 and October 1996 respectively. In between these episodes, he was cast as a Cardassian informant in the third-season episode "Improbable Cause".

Following this, Ruskin appeared in his only Star Trek film role, cast as a Son'a officer in Star Trek: Insurrection. He made an appearance in Star Trek: Voyager in the episode "Gravity", first airing on February 3, 1999, in which he played a Vulcan master.

Ruskin's final Star Trek appearance was in Star Trek: Enterprise. He appeared as a Suliban doctor in the pilot episode "Broken Bow", which aired on September 26, 2001. Along with Majel Barrett, Clint Howard, Jack Donner and Vince Deadrick Sr, Ruskin was one of only five actors to appear in both Star Trek: The Original Series (1966) and Star Trek: Enterprise (2001).

== Union activity ==
Ruskin became a board member of the Screen Actors Guild (SAG) in 1976, and served on its board until 1999. He also became the first Western Regional Vice President of Actors' Equity Association in 1979. For his dedication and service, Actors Equity gave him its Lucy Jordan Award in 2003, and Patrick Quinn Award in 2013. SAG bestowed on him its Ralph Morgan Award in 2011.

== Spouses ==
Barbara Greene (May 24, 1992 – December 28, 2013) and Patricia Herd (September 9, 1968 – November 28, 1979) (divorced, one child).

== Death ==
Ruskin died on December 28, 2013, at a hospital in Santa Monica, California.

== Partial filmography ==
- Alfred Hitchcock Presents (1958) (Season 3 Episode 25: "Flight to the East") - Man Entering Shop (uncredited)
- The Untouchables (1959, Episode: "Mexican Stake-out") – Fred Metcalf (uncredited)
- Hell Bent for Leather (1960) – Shad
- The Twilight Zone (1960, Episode: "The Man in the Bottle") - Genie
- The Rise and Fall of Legs Diamond (1960) – Matt Moran
- The Magnificent Seven (1960) – Flynn (uncredited)
- The Untouchables (1961, Episode: "The Seventh Vote")
- The Twilight Zone (1962, Episode "To Serve Man" - Kanamit (voice, uncredited)
- Gunsmoke (1962) "The Gallows" Season 7, Episode 22 - The Judge
- Diary of a Madman (1963) – The Horla (voice)
- The Alfred Hitchcock Hour (1963) (Season 1 Episode 32: "Death of a Cop") - Gabby Donovan
- The Dakotas (1963, Episode: "Feud at Snake River") - The Rider
- Robin and the 7 Hoods (1964) – Twitch
- Get Smart (1965, Episode: "Now You See Him ... Now You Don't") – Ehrlich
- Gunsmoke (1966, Episode: "Stage Stop") – Outlaw Curt Hansen
- The Man from U.N.C.L.E. (1966, Episode: "The Her Master's Voice Affair") – Jason Sutro
- The Time Tunnel (1966, Episode: “Revenge Of The Gods”) - Sardis Ulysses’ aide
- The Lucy Show (1966, Episode: “Lucy and John Wayne”) - The Director
- The Wild Wild West (1965–1967, TV Series) – Felice Munez / Viper Black
- Mission Impossible (1967, Episodes: "The Slave" Pt.I/II) – King Ibn Borca
- Star Trek: The Original Series (1968, Episode: "The Gamesters of Triskelion") – Galt
- Mission Impossible (1969, Episode: "The Brothers") – Colonel Hatafis
- Land of the Giants (1970, Episode: “The Secret City Of Limbo” – General Aza
- Hogan's Heroes (1970, Episode: The Gestapo Takeover) – Major Strauss
- Mission Impossible (1972, Episode: "The Puppet") - Khalid
- Bogard (1974) – Scarletti
- The Six Million Dollar Man (1974–1975, TV Series) – Markos / Le Duc
- The Magician (1974, Episode: "The Illusion of the Cat's Eye") – Hassid
- The Bionic Woman (1977, Episode: "Jaime and the King") – Prime Minister Hassan
- Wonder Woman (1978, Episode: "The Man Who Wouldn't Tell") - Dr. Black (uncredited)
- The Gypsy Warriors (1978) – Grenault
- The Sword and the Sorcerer (1982) – Malcolm
- The Man Who Wasn't There (1983) – Hassan Khaffiri
- The Greatest Adventure: Stories from the Bible (1985) - (voice, episode: "Joseph and his Brother")
- Prizzi's Honor (1985) – Marxie Heller
- The Longshot (1986) – Fusco
- The Smurfs (1986) - Additional voices
- DuckTales (1987, episode: "Sphinx for the Memories") - (voice)
- Snorks (1987) - Additional voices
- Saturday the 14th Strikes Back (1988) – Kharis
- The Adventures of Don Coyote and Sancho Panda (1990) - Additional voices
- L.A. Law (episode: "Badfellas" (1991) – Pappas
- Indecent Proposal (1993) – Pit Boss
- Deadly Exposure (1993) – Abe
- The Criminal Mind (1993) – Manny Kohen
- Firepower (1993) – Drexal
- CyberTracker (1994) – Rounds
- Star Trek: Deep Space Nine (episodes: "The House of Quark" (1994), "Improbable Cause" (1995) and "Looking for par'Mach in All the Wrong Places", TV Series) – Tumek / Informant
- Spider-Man (1995, episodes: "Neogenic Nightmare Chapter 4: The Mutant Agenda," "Neogenic Nightmare Chapter 5: Mutants Revenge," "Neogenic Nightmare Chapter 13: Shriek of the Vulture") - Lewald (voice)
- Star Trek: Insurrection (1998) – Son'a Officer #3
- Star Trek: Voyager (1999, Episode: "Gravity") – Vulcan Master
- Star Trek: Enterprise (2001, Episode: "Broken Bow") – Suliban Doctor
- Wishcraft (2002) – Taxidermist
- The Scorpion King (2002) – Tribal Leader
- The Streetsweeper (2002)
- Diamond Zero (2005) – Quentin Leeds
- Smokin' Aces (2006) – Primo Sparazza
