= The Galaxy Being =

- The Outer Limits episode
- Episode no.: Season 1 Episode 1
- Directed by: Leslie Stevens
- Written by: Leslie Stevens
- Cinematography by: John M. Nickolaus
- Production code: 1
- Original air date: September 16, 1963

Guest appearances
- Lee Philips; Jacqueline Scott; Cliff Robertson

Episode chronology
← Previous —	Next → "The Hundred Days of the Dragon"

"The Galaxy Being" is the first episode of the original The Outer Limits television series, originally broadcast on September 16, 1963. In it, Allan Maxwell, an engineer for a small radio station, somehow makes contact with a peaceful alien creature – the "Galaxy Being" – who is then transported to Earth by accident. The Galaxy Being inadvertently kills several people with its natural radiation, and is met with violence from the people of Earth.

== Narration ==
The opening narration to this and future episodes beginning with "There is nothing wrong with your television set" from "the Control Voice" was performed by veteran radio, screen, and TV actor, Vic Perrin. The Control Voice also provided opening and closing narration.

== Plot ==
Allan Maxwell is an engineer who has dedicated himself to researching microwave background noise using a device powered from his radio station. He inadvertently gets an extraterrestrial being from Andromeda on his three-dimensional television screen. Using his computer, Maxwell is able to translate the being's thought patterns into English. Both are conducting illicit experiments; Maxwell should not be using the radio station's power, and the being is not allowed to use equipment for exploration.

The being explains that it is a "nitrogen cycle" lifeform, that there is "no death in our dimension" and that wars are "...forbidden. Reason we are not allowed to contact you, you are danger to other galaxies." The two have further enlightening philosophical conversation, in which no epistemological basis is given for the Andromedan's affirmation that Maxwell's "brain waves" will "go on" subsequent to the death of his carbon-based body. The being explains that "electromagnetic forces underlying all ... electromagnetic force intelligent" and "Infinity is God. God, infinity, all the same," in response to Maxwell's query regarding whether the being believes in God as an intelligent force. Maxwell appears to accept the Andromedan's explanations as the knowledge of a superior being.

That evening, Allan reluctantly leaves the radio station to be feted at a banquet. He leaves the channel open to the Andromedan, who warns, "Do not increase power levels." However, against Allan's instructions, disk jockey Eddie Phillips, who is substituting for Allan's brother Buddy, turns up the power to full, causing the Andromedan to be transmitted to Earth as a three-dimensional electromagnetic being. The "Galaxy Being," as it is dubbed, wreaks inadvertent havoc, killing Eddie and injuring several other people by burning them with radiation. The Galaxy Being encounters Allan in person, who convinces it to turn down the heat and then guides it back to the transmitter shed. The two are soon cornered by local authorities, who accidentally shoot Allan's wife, Carol. The Being then uses beneficial radiation to heal the wound.

When the Galaxy Being emerges, the authorities attempt to kill it; but it protects itself by destroying the bullets in flight, again with radiation. As a warning (and perhaps to prevent other Andromedans from coming), the Being destroys the transmitter tower. The crowd is told, "There are powers in this universe beyond anything you know ... there is much you have to learn. Go to your homes. Go and give thought to the mysteries of the universe. I will leave you now, in peace." At this, the crowd disperses.

The Galaxy Being chooses not to return home because it has violated a law forbidding contact with Earth. So, after first reassuring Allan that, "There is no death for me," the Being reduces its microwave intensity which causes it to fade out from the Terran realm. Its last words as it vanishes into another putative dimension are, "End of transmission."

== Sign-off narration ==
We now return control of your television set to you, until next week at this same time, when the Control Voice will take you to... The Outer Limits.

The show’s now-famous introduction and epilogue narration heard from "The Control Voice" was performed by veteran radio, screen and TV actor, Vic Perrin.

== Analysis ==
The shimmering effect of the alien was generated by filming a specially treated rubber suit through polarized lenses. This photographic negative illustrates the effect used to create the appearance of the alien in the three-dimensional television transceiver.

Booker observes that the engineer and the Galaxy Being are variations of the television and science fiction tropes of the mad scientist and the invading alien, albeit with a reversal typical of The Outer Limits that both the scientist and the alien are benevolent, and it is the ordinary human beings of Earth who are the villains in the story.

The story itself dramatized the coverage in popular media of the time of speculation as to whether other planets could be contacted via radio, most particularly the (at the time recently initiated) "Project Ozma" search for radio signals from extraterrestrial intelligence ("SETI"). It developed these themes further into a story about electronic existentialism, and tapped into themes prevalent in U.S. culture at the time, including the televising of the space race and the fascination with television transmission in general. The Galaxy Being itself echoed the contemporary words of NASA with lines such as "You must explore. You must reach out."

The story also had elements of horror. Like another Outer Limits story, "The Borderland", it addressed the idea of an electronic limbo that exists when television signals cease transmission or are broadcast out into space, raising questions such as where the Galaxy Being goes when he turns off the transmitter. This horror of oblivion was to occur in several other Outer Limits episodes.

== Cast ==
- Cliff Robertson – as Allan Maxwell
- Jacqueline Scott – as Carol Maxwell
- Lee Philips – as Gene "Buddy" Maxwell
- William O. Douglas Jr. (credited) and Charles McQuarry (uncredited)– as the Galaxy Being
- Leslie Stevens (uncredited) – as the Voice of The Galaxy Being
- Burt Metcalfe – as Eddie Phillips
- Allyson Ames – as Loreen
- James Frawley – as State Trooper
- Bill Catching – as National Guard Major
- Allan Pinson – as Policeman
- Roy Sickner – as Collins, the Caretaker

== Production ==
Filming took nine days to complete, at radio station KCBH (now KYSR) in Coldwater Canyon, MGM Backlot #4 Andy Hardy Street, and Soundstage #3 at KTTV Channel 11. The Budget for the production was $213,000.
