= Janos Prohaska =

Hungarian-American actor and stunt performer

- Publicity Photo of Janos Prohaska
- Born: János Prohászka; October 10, 1919; Budapest, Hungary
- Died: March 13, 1974 (aged 54); Inyo County, California, U.S.
- Occupations: Actor; stunt performer
- Years active: 1959–1974
- Spouse: Irene M. Knoke (m. 1969)

Janos Prohaska (born János Prohászka; October 10, 1919 – March 13, 1974) was a Hungarian-born American actor and stunt performer. He appeared on American television from the 1960s and usually played the roles of animals (mostly bears and gorillas) or monsters.

He played a recurring comic role as The Cookie Bear on The Andy Williams Show from 1969 to 1971. Prohaska also appeared in multiple roles on TV series including The Outer Limits, Bewitched, I Dream of Jeannie, Lost in Space, and a few episodes of Gilligan's Island, where he plays a gorilla. His only credited role on that series appears in the episode "Our Vines Have Tender Apes." He also played the title role in the 1965 Perry Mason episode, "The Case of the Grinning Gorilla". In 1967 he appeared as a white gorilla in the "Fatal Cargo" episode of the ABC-TV sci-fi series Voyage to the Bottom of the Sea.

He was in the first Star Trek pilot, The Cage, as an ape and as a humanoid bird. Later he was in three episodes of the original Star Trek series, wearing alien costumes he himself designed and made as the Horta in "The Devil in the Dark" and the mugato in "A Private Little War".

He also stunt-doubled for both Arnold Stang and Peter Falk in the 1963 film It's a Mad, Mad, Mad, Mad World in which Stang, a small and lightweight man, wore shoulder pads under his costume so that his appearance would match the bulky appearance of Prohaska.

Prohaska made an appearance on an episode of What's My Line? in 1969, where he wore one of his ape costumes.

== Personal life and death ==
Prohaska was born on October 10, 1919 in Budapest, Hungary. He was married to Irene M. Knoke from June 29, 1969 until his death on March 13, 1974. He and his son Robert were killed along with 34 others in the crash of a chartered Sierra Pacific Airlines Convair CV-440 aircraft near Bishop, California, while filming the ABC/Wolper Productions television series Primal Man. The plane flew into a mountain ridge in darkness, and the exact cause of the crash was never determined. Prohaska was cremated and his ashes were interred in the Mausoleum at Woodlawn Memorial Cemetery, Santa Monica.

== Filmography ==
Year	Title	Role	Notes
1962	Billy Rose's Jumbo	Circus Performer #14	
1963	The Outer Limits	Allen as Thetan	Episode: "The Architects of Fear" (Uncredited)
1963	The Outer Limits	Darwin the Chimpanzee	Episode: "The Sixth Finger" (Uncredited)
1964	Advance to the Rear	Flagpole Sitter	Uncredited
1964	Bikini Beach	Clyde the Chimp	
1965	The Outer Limits	The Mikie	Episode: "The Probe"
1965	Perry Mason	The Gorilla	Episode: "The Case of the Grinning Gorilla"
1966	The Lucy Show	The Gorilla	Episode: "Lucy and The Monkey"
1967	Man of Steel	The Bear	
1967	Star Trek	Horta	Episode: "The Devil in the Dark" (Uncredited)
1968	Star Trek	The Mugato	Episode: "A Private Little War"
1969	Star Trek	Yarnek	Episode: "The Savage Curtain" (Uncredited)
1969	Land of the Giants	Gorilla	Episode: "Comeback"
1970	Land of the Giants	Bobo the Gorilla	Episode: "The Marionettes"
1970	Pussycat, Pussycat, I Love You	Gorilla	
1971	Escape from the Planet of the Apes	Heloise	Uncredited
1974	Zandy's Bride	Bear	Uncredited
1986	Star Trek	Anthropoid Ape / Humanoid Bird	Episode: "The Cage" (Uncredited); First pilot (1965) not released until 1986
