= A Feasibility Study =

- The Outer Limits episode
- Episode no.: Season 1 Episode 29
- Directed by: Byron Haskin
- Written by: Joseph Stefano
- Cinematography by: John M. Nickolaus
- Production code: 9
- Original air date: April 13, 1964

Guest appearances
- Sam Wanamaker; Phyllis Love; Joyce Van Patten; David Opatoshu

Episode chronology
| ← Previous "The Special One" | Next → "Production and Decay of Strange Particles" |

"A Feasibility Study" is an episode of the original The Outer Limits television show. It first aired on April 13, 1964, during the first season. It was remade in 1997 as part of the revived The Outer Limits series with a minor title change: "Feasibility Study".

== Opening narration ==
The planet Luminos: A minor planet, sultry and simmering. Incapacitated. Earth scientists have concluded that there could be no life on Luminos, that it is too close to its own sun, and that its inhabitants would be victimized by their own blighting atmosphere. But there is life on Luminos — life that should resemble ours, but doesn't. Desperate life, suffering a great and terrible need. The Luminoids have begun to search the universe in an effort to gratify that need. They seek a planet on which life is healthy, vibrant, strong, and mobile. They need such people to do their work, to labor and slave for them, to manufacture their splendored dreams. The Luminoids need slaves, and they have chosen the planet off which their slaves will be abducted. Not too many at first, a neighborhood-full, perhaps. A neighborhood like mine or yours. Those who will be abducted sleep in dreamy ignorance, unaware that they are about to become the subjects of a grotesque and sophisticated experiment... a feasibility study.

== Plot ==
A six-block suburban area –people and all– is teleported to Luminos. The Luminoids will study the feasibility of enslaving humans because Luminoids suffer from a genetic disease which condemns them to become as immobile as rocks as they age.

Eventually, a suburbanite is introduced to the hideous Luminoid rulers, who reveal their plans and that the punishment for disobedience is to be touched by a Luminoid and thereby contract their terrible disease.

The humans realize that they've been trapped with no chance of returning home. They accept that their former lives are over. Even submission to the Luminoids would not prevent inadvertent infection. All that's left is defiance and protecting the rest of humanity back on Earth. In the final scene, they willfully contract the disease from each other, thus choosing death over slavery, and rendering the Luminoids' experiment inconclusive. The abduction of the human race is proven infeasible, and abandoned.

== Closing narration ==
"Do not enter upon or cross this area. Do not touch or remove possibly radioactive dirt or rocks. If you have any knowledge concerning this disappearance, please contact your nearest police department." It could have happened to any neighborhood. Had those who lived in this one been less human, less brave, it would have happened to all the neighborhoods of the Earth. Feasibility study ended. Abduction of human race: Infeasible.

== Cast ==
- Sam Wanamaker – as Dr. Simon Holm
- Phyllis Love – as Andrea Holm
- David Opatoshu – as Ralph Cashman
- Joyce Van Patten – as Rhea Cashman
- Frank Puglia – as Father Fontana
- Glenn Cannon – as Teenage Luminoid
- Robert H. Justman – as The Authority, the Luminoid Elder
- Ben Wright as the voice of The Authority.
