= Keeper of the Purple Twilight =

- The Outer Limits episode
- Episode no.: Season 2 Episode 12
- Directed by: Charles Haas
- Story by: Stephen Lord
- Teleplay by: Milton Krims
- Cinematography by: Kenneth Peach
- Production code: 39
- Original air date: December 5, 1964

Guest appearance
- Robert Webber

Episode chronology
← Previous "The Inheritors"	Next → "The Duplicate Man"

"Keeper of the Purple Twilight" is an episode of the original The Outer Limits television show. It first aired on December 5, 1964, during the second season.

'Pilots of the purple twilight, dropping down with costly bales' is a line in Alfred Tennyson's poem Locksley Hall (written 1835).

== Opening narration ==
There is no limit to the extension of the curious mind. It reaches to the end of the imagination, then beyond into the mysteries of dreams, hoping always to convert even the dreams into reality, for the greater well-being of all mankind…

== Plot ==
Scientist Eric Plummer comes under the sinister influence of a creature from outer space, capable of materializing in human form, but lacking human emotions.

As a prelude for the invasion of Earth by his kind, an extraterrestrial being, Ikaar, studies the human race. The one thing he cannot comprehend is emotion. Meanwhile, obsessed scientist Plummer is nearing a nervous breakdown, trying to complete a magnetic disintegrator that will convert matter into pure energy. As Plummer's weapon would aid Ikar's invasion force if completed, Ikar makes a deal with Plummer (who is unaware of Ikar's purpose). He will help Plummer complete the invention by offering his technical knowledge to provide the new equations necessary for the invention's completion in exchange for the scientist's ability to feel emotions for a "test drive".

It is revealed that Ikar comes from a hive world with strictly defined roles, divorced from emotion and personal identity. Big brains (like himself) do the thinking, while soldiers do the fighting, and females produce the offspring as their only function.

Due to the interference of Plummer's girlfriend, Janet Lane, Ikar is unable to control or understand his adopted emotions. This causes the experiment to backfire. The alien has great difficulty in understanding such things as love and beauty - concepts utterly foreign in his world. Ikar's behavior comes to the attention of his superiors, who dispatch soldier-forms of his species to discipline him. Meanwhile, Plummer uses Ikar's data to harness a fantastic energy source and fashions a weapon capable of destroying all life.

Ikar, who has begun to experience emotions such as anger and desire for Janet (who compares Ikar's world to an ant colony) returns the scientist's emotions to him. Ikar is now being pursued by his own species, who regard him as a threat to the planned invasion. It is revealed the aliens' homeworld is overpopulated, and they have chosen Earth to be their new home. In the end, having experienced emotions and now feeling sympathy for Plummer, Ikar kills two of the soldiers but is himself disintegrated before Plummer destroys the last soldier. In disgust, Plummer destroys his weapon, erasing all traces of his work and evidence of the aliens.

== Closing narration ==
The curious mind cannot be chained. It is a free mind, endlessly searching for the greater freedom that must eventually make every living being joyfully complete within himself; therefore at peace with himself and his neighbors.

== Cast ==
- Robert Webber – as Ikar
- Warren Stevens – as Prof. Eric Plummer
- Gail Kobe – as Janet Lane
- Curt Conway – as Franklin Karlin
- Edward Platt – as David Hunt
- Michael Lane – as Ikar in Alien form (uncredited)
- Hugh Langtry – as Alien Soldier#1 (uncredited)
- Gene Wiley – as Alien Soldier#2 (uncredited)
- LeRoy Ellis – as Alien Soldier#3 (uncredited)
- Fred Krone - as Warren Stevens's Stunt Double (uncredited)
- Fred Stromsoe - as Robert Webber's Stunt Double (uncredited)

== Legacy ==
The creatures on this episode were adapted to Diener Industries' Space Creatures line.
