= The Probe =

- The Outer Limits episode
- Episode no.: Season 2 Episode 17
- Directed by: Felix Feist
- Story by: Sam Neuman
- Teleplay by: Seeleg Lester
- Cinematography by: Kenneth Peach; Fred J. Koenekamp
- Production code: 48
- Original air date: January 16, 1965

Guest appearances
- Mark Richman; Peggy Ann Garner; Ron Hayes

Episode chronology
← Previous "The Premonition"	Next → —

"The Probe" was the final episode of the original The Outer Limits television show. It first broadcast on January 16, 1965, during the second season.

== Opening narration ==
The persistence of Man's curiosity led him into new worlds. Without conquering his own, he invaded the sub-world of the microscope, and the outer-world of space. It is said turnabout is fair play… but is it?

== The story ==
The final episode of The Outer Limits deals with four plane crash survivors who suddenly find themselves trapped in an alien space probe that is taking water samples. Inside they find a puzzle they need to solve before all four are killed.

== Plot ==
En route to Tokyo, a plane flies into a storm and the pilot is forced to ditch the plane into the eye of a hurricane. The crew and passengers awake on a life boat and soon discover that they have been captured by an alien space probe.

The passengers captured are Jefferson Rome, Amanda Frank, Coberly (the pilot), and Dexter. They originally think that they're inside the eye of the hurricane and try to use the emergency radio. The four discover that they are not floating on the ocean, but are inside a foggy floor surface. The radio doesn't work. Once inside, the four are bathed in some sort of mist that emerges from a large circle atop a pedestal, which cleanses them and dries their clothing. Dexter is frozen within the light beam coming out of the same circle, but is rescued by the others before he is frozen completely. Dexter stays behind while the others begin to explore the inside of the probe.

Jefferson Rome and the others discover a room with an alien telemetry system. The probe is drawing up seawater. Jefferson Rome remembers the space probe Surveyor, used to study other nearby planets such as Venus, Mars and Jupiter. A mutant microbe, larger than a person, attacks Dexter, and presumably consumes him, as the others are exploring the probe. Rome surmises that the raft was being subjected to testing and they got in the way. Rome, Amanda Frank and Coberly discover the giant microbe, but it is zapped by the alien's freeze beam. It splits off a portion of itself to survive.

Rome, looking at data in the Analog Room, notices a pattern - that the probe moved from world to world, using some sort of space warping drive system. The microbe may have gotten inside. They see a screen transmitting symbols, and Rome attempts communication by altering the sequence of the alien symbols.

Meanwhile, the microbe tries to attack Coberly, but is held off by Jefferson and Amanda. The alien circle begins to transmit light beams in sequence. The probe then captures three of the humans in transparent tubes to sterilize them and protect them from the microbe. The probe then prepares its lift off procedures. While Coberly goes to use the radio, Rome and Amanda attempt to communicate by figuring out the alien symbols. Outside the Analog Room, Coberly is enveloped in an alien mist and disappears. Jefferson leaves the Analog Room to look for Coberly. He, too, disappears in the alien mist.

When communication fails, Amanda begs for the aliens to understand their predicament. She panics and leaves the Analog Room to look for Rome and Coberly. The alien light beam begins to probe her and she is surrounded by the mist. Atop the alien probe surface deck, she is reunited with Jefferson and Coberly. A rescue plane arrives and Coberly transmits their coordinates. Aboard the rescue plane, Amanda thinks she did get through, though even Rome could not transmit their position. Outside, the alien probe lifts off and suddenly explodes. The aliens had understood them and broken down Earth's alphabet. Rome wonders whether they would be as wise if the probe were from their own world, to which Amanda responds by hoping that they would be wise and kind enough.

== Closing narration ==
A few days, a week, a month… Will the Earth be visited by a stranger from the universe? A warm, compassionate stranger, to tell us of wonders beyond imagination, of life beyond comprehension, of secrets from the treasure house of stars?

== Cast ==
- Peter Mark Richman – as Jefferson Rome
- Peggy Ann Garner – as Amanda Frank
- Ron Hayes – as Pilot Coberly
- William Stevens – as Dexter
- William Boyett – as Beeman
- Richard Tretter – as Radio Engineer
- Janos Prohaska – as "The Mikie"
