= The Sixth Finger =

- The Outer Limits episode
- Episode no.: Season 1 Episode 5
- Directed by: James Goldstone
- Written by: Ellis St. Joseph
- Cinematography by: John M. Nickolaus
- Production code: 11
- Original air date: October 14, 1963

Guest appearances
- David McCallum; Jill Haworth; Edward Mulhare

Episode chronology
← Previous "The Man with the Power"	Next → "The Man Who Was Never Born"

"The Sixth Finger" is an episode of the original The Outer Limits television show. It first aired on October 14, 1963, during the first season.

== Plot ==
Working in a remote Welsh mining town, a rogue scientist, Professor Mathers, discovers a process that affects the speed of evolutionary mutation. Mathers suffers guilt for his role in developing a super-destructive atomic bomb, and hopes his new discovery will benefit the human race.

A disgruntled miner, Gwyllm Griffiths, volunteers for an experiment that will enable the professor to create a being with enhanced mental capabilities. After undergoing the equivalent of 20,000 years of evolution, Gwyllm soon begins growing an overdeveloped cortex and a sixth finger on each hand. When the mutation process begins to operate independently of the professor's influence, Gwyllm takes control of the experiment.

Now experiencing the equivalent of one million years of evolution, and equipped with superior intelligence and powers of mind, such as telekinesis, that are capable of great destruction, Gwyllm seeks vengeance on the mining town which he loathes. When he meets two motorcycle cops, he says, "Your ignorance makes me ill and angry ... your savageness ... must end!" However, before he acts on his thoughts, Gwyllm holds back, realizing he has by now "evolved beyond hatred or revenge, or even the desire for power," and instead longs for "when the mind will cast off the hamperings of the flesh and become all thought and no matter – a vortex of pure intelligence in space."

Gwyllm enlists the help of his girlfriend, Cathy Evans, to operate the machine to push his evolution even further forward. Instead, out of love for him, Cathy reverses the process at the last second, bringing Gwyllm back to his former self. But the out-of-control reversal is too much for Gwyllm, and he slowly succumbs to the adverse effects while Cathy comforts him.

== Production ==
Regarding Ellis St. Joseph's original script, a number of scenes and characters were removed or condensed to save money, including five speaking parts – Bryn Evans, Gert the Bread's legless, Bible-thumping husband (Cathy Evans' father); Wilks, the local police constable; Robbart and Emlyn, two coal miners, and the fat Mr. Caradoc, the pit owner. The dialogue between Gwyllm and Prof. Mathers at the end of Act Three, when Gwyllm declares his intentions to obliterate the village, was originally slightly longer. This shortened version of the script was only 40 pages long (one page roughly equaling one minute of screentime). To fill the gap, the sequence of Gwyllm discovering music was quickly written as a five-minute insert by Joseph Stefano. For this, the then-new Glenn Gould recordings of the Bach preludes were used, which were performed faster than anyone had done them before. The scene used three different preludes. As it opens, Gwyllm plays the Prelude and Fugue No. 2 in C Minor. Most of the conversation with Mathers uses Prelude and Fugue No. 5 in D Major. When he says "I shall stop soon anyway," he begins Prelude and Fugue No. 1 in C Major. The start of Act Four, showing Gwyllm's vengeful rampage against the mine, was removed. Originally, Gwyllm kills Wilks and his deputies, then proceeds on to the mine. The gatekeeper sees him coming, enveloped in a bituminous aura. Mr. Caradoc sets off the disaster whistle just as Gwyllm reduces him to smoldering ashes. Gwyllm then places a box of dynamite at the pit entrance, igniting the fuse with a burning glance. Emlyn, one of the trapped terrified miners, attacks him with a pickaxe and is flattened by a burst of kinetic force. Gwyllm then becomes translucent, evolving beyond the need for vengeance and abandons the burning fuse to walk back to Mathers' Lab. Robbart, another miner, stamps out the fuse. Gwyllm later tells Cathy his ghostly translucence is evidence of his further evolution: "I can now live by photosynthesis of pure light."

The ABC censor, Dorothy Brown, objected to the Darwinism and promotion of evolution inherent in "The Sixth Finger". One of the earliest deletions from the script was a speech by Prof. Mathers on the subject of recapitulation theory: "In the short span of nine months, every human embryo passes through a million years of its previous evolution, from protoplasm to fish to amphibian to furry ape with a tail to man. I'm experimenting with a means of continuing this process in the same lifetime." – the dialogue foreshadowing the fate Ellis St. Joseph had in store for Gwyllm once Cathy pulls the lever on Mathers' machine, reversing his evolution. As originally scripted, Gwyllm devolves into the protoplasmic form of a jellyfish. However, ABC executives would only allow him to regress to the stages of early man, due to concerns that religious viewers who did not accept the theory of evolution would be offended.

The Welsh village was shot on English Towne Street on Metro-Goldwyn-Mayer's backlot. Mrs. Ives' boarding house, where the experiments take place, was a Victorian mansion known as The Vinegar Tree house on backlot #2. The stock footage establishing the Welsh village was from How Green Was My Valley (1941).

== Cast ==
- David McCallum – as Gwyllm Griffiths
- Edward Mulhare – as Prof. Mathers
- Jill Haworth – as Cathy Evans
- Nora Marlowe – as Mrs. Ives
- Janos Prohaska – as Darwin, Prof. Mathers' trained chimpanzee
- Constance Cavendish – as Gert "the Bread" Evans
- Robert Doyle – as Wilt Morgan

== See also ==
- List of The Outer Limits (1963 TV series) episodes
- Transhumanism in fiction
- The Man Who Evolved
