= The Chameleon (The Outer Limits) =

- The Outer Limits episode
- Episode no.: Season 1 Episode 31
- Directed by: Gerd Oswald
- Story by: Lou Morheim; Joseph Stefano; Robert Towne
- Teleplay by: Robert Towne
- Cinematography by: Kenneth Peach
- Production code: 32
- Original air date: April 27, 1964

Guest appearance
- Robert Duvall

Episode chronology
← Previous "Production and Decay of Strange Particles"	Next → "The Forms of Things Unknown"

"The Chameleon" is an episode of the original The Outer Limits television show. It first aired on April 27, 1964, during the first season.

== Opening narration ==
"The race of Man is known for its mutability. We can change our moods, our faces, our lives to suit whatever situation confronts us. Adapt and survive. Even among the most changeable of living things, Man is quicksilver-more chameleon-like than the chameleon, determined to survive, no matter what the cost to others... or to himself."

== Plot ==
A flying saucer has landed in a remote part of the United States and wiped out a military patrol sent to investigate. Falsely believing that the saucer contains nuclear material, the authorities decide on a wild scheme: they recruit Louis Mace, a disaffected CIA agent, to infiltrate the ship.

Genetically modified to pass as an alien, Mace finds that he has unique insight into the alien "invaders" nature, the genetic material that has been used to modify his appearance seemingly taking precedence over his human nature. He also begins to question his allegiance, and eventually sides with the aliens, finding out that they're benevolent and have no desire to come in contact with humans in any way, being simply stranded on Earth after their ship's engine broke down.

Accepting to lend their trust to Mace and acknowledging him as one of them, the aliens propose that Mace return to their home planet with them. Torn between his desire to be free and his loyalty towards his superiors, Mace first reacts aggressively, killing one of the two aliens, but he eventually realizes the cruelty of his act and feels remorse for showing these harmless visitors what dark instincts inhabit the human nature. It is also implied that the alien that Mace killed was the one whose DNA had been used to modify Mace's anatomy; effectively making him a duplicate of the creature.

The remaining alien nonetheless forgives him and allows him to leave Earth with them. At first distressed by that choice, Mace's superior eventually allows him to do so, believing this would be a chance for Mace to be at last free of his condition.

== Closing narration ==
"A man's survival can take many shapes, and the shape in which a man finds his humanity is not always a human one."

== Cast ==
- Robert Duvall – as Louis Mace
- Howard Caine – as Leon Chambers
- Henry Brandon – as Gen. Crawford
- Douglas Henderson – as Dr. Tillyard
- William O'Connell – as Creature #1
- Dean Smith as Creature #2 (uncredited)
- Tony Olvera – as Guitarist (uncredited)
- Roy Jensen – as Agent with Pistol (uncredited)
- Roy Olvera – as Mexican Guitarist (uncredited)
- Vic Perrin – as voice of Soldier (uncredited)
- Robert Johnson – as voice on Loudspeaker / voice of Chopper Pilot (uncredited)
