= The Forms of Things Unknown =

- The Outer Limits episode
- Episode no.: Season 1 Episode 32
- Directed by: Gerd Oswald
- Written by: Joseph Stefano
- Cinematography by: Conrad Hall
- Production code: 24
- Original air date: May 4, 1964

Guest appearances
- Vera Miles; Sir Cedric Hardwicke; Scott Marlowe; David McCallum; Barbara Rush

Episode chronology
| ← Previous "The Chameleon" | Next → "Soldier" |

"The Forms of Things Unknown" is an episode of the original The Outer Limits television show. It first aired on May 4, 1964, and was the final episode of the first season. The title derives from William Shakespeare's A Midsummer Night's Dream, Act 5, Scene 1. A variant version of the episode would have served as the pilot for a horror/suspense series called The Unknown.

== Plot ==
In the French countryside, playboy Andre drives with Kasha Paine and Leonora Edmond. While stopped for a swim at a small lake, Andre gloats about preparing to blackmail Leonora's father and demands the women make him a drink. They poison it and load his corpse into the trunk of the car. While searching for a burial location, they see a funeral procession that puts Leonora on edge. That night during a thunderstorm, lightning flashes makes her believe the corpse had blinked.

They go to a nearby house, and are greeted by Colas, who is blind. He informs them that Mr Hobart is not at home but will return soon. In the house they see odd decorations including a toy tightrope walker. Hobart returns home and is revealed to be an inventor. He retires, asking not to be disturbed. In his workshop is Andre's corpse, standing in the center of a strange device.

While Kasha goes to bury Andre, who she still believes is in the car, Leonora becomes mesmerized by the tightrope walker. Hobart enters and asks her about Andre, and Leonora answers truthfully as if hypnotized. Hobart invites her upstairs to watch him revive Andre and thus free her of her guilt of the murder. He explains that he has invented a device that "tilts" the past to resurrect the dead. Hobart's room is dominated by the time tilter, a large collection of clocks all connected by wires to a pole in the center of the room. The loud ticking overwhelms Leonora who faints, but Hobart is distracted because Andre is missing.

When Leonora awakes, Kasha has returned and Hobart has left to search for Andre. Colas is revealed to be the owner of the house and Hobart has been his guest for roughly a year. Colas claims that Hobart had died and been brought back to life by the time tilter.

Kasha and Leonora try to leave, but the exit is blocked by the trunk of the car. A fully-clothed and living Andre emerges, and Leonora flees. Colas finds Hobart lying in the road who begins searching for Andre to fix the mistake he made in reviving him, now knowing Andre is evil. Hobart confronts Andre with a pistol, but Andre disarms Hobart when he becomes hypnotized by the tightrope walker. Andre shoots the pistol into a chair inches from the inventor's head and tosses the gun aside. Andre leaves with Kasha who jumps from the car. He tries to run her over with the car but she leaps out of the way. The car crashes and Andre is killed, returning him to death.

Hobart finds Leonora fainted near an open briefcase in his room. She has found a letter which reveals that Hobart left school to discover a way to return his dead mother to life. Kasha returns to find Leonora and tells her Andre is dead. Hobart disappears into the time tilter after asking Leonora to destroy it.

== Production ==
Much of the footage from this episode was used in a pilot episode for an unsold suspense/horror anthology series entitled The Unknown, which was created and would have been produced by Joseph Stefano. Leslie Stevens was the executive producer. The unaired pilot is also named “The Unknown” and was commissioned by ABC, which later declined to green-light the proposed series. About its development, Dominic Stefano says his father, Joseph Stefano, rewrote "that original script of 'The Forms of Things Unknown' into two different scripts. One called 'Madmen and Lovers' and one called 'The Forms of Things Unknown'. . .(He) then rewrote both yet again. 'Lovers and Madmen' became 'The Unknown,' and they filmed the pilot simultaneously. . . They used some common scenes between the two, but changed the story for the pilot because it had a different purpose."

The show was filmed with two endings and was allotted double the normal production time. The Unknown pilot rationalizes away the "time tuner" as a delusion. Andre reveals there is no Thanatos tree, and that he was nearly actually dead. Hobart was also not dead but merely in a temporary coma. Lastly, Kasha uses the pistol to kill Hobart, thinking he is attacking Leonora.

== Reception ==
The episode is noted for its similarities to Hitchcock's Psycho, for which Joseph Stefano had written the screenplay. David McCallum's dead-mother obsessed inventor Tone Hobart is analogous to Norman Bates. The episode also draws on Les Diaboliques, a precursor to Psycho, with Vera Miles and Barbara Rush corresponding to Simone Signoret and Vera Clouzot. Bruce Bennett in a review of Outer Limits cited "The Forms of Things Unknown" as a standout episode, describing the screenplay as a blending "Clouzot's Diabolique, James Whale's The Old Dark House, and Stefano's own Psycho screenplay into a hypnotic 51-minute neo-gothic psychodrama pitched somewhere between a fairy tale and a stag film."

== Cast ==
- Vera Miles – as Kasha Paine
- Sir Cedric Hardwicke – as Colas
- Scott Marlowe – as André
- David McCallum – as Tone Hobart
- Barbara Rush – as Leonora Edmond
- Wolfe Barzelle – as French Person #1
- Madeline Holmes – as French Person #2
- Gabrielle Rossillon – as French Person #3

This episode was the final acting role of Sir Cedric Hardwicke. He died on August 6, 1964, three months after this episode aired.
