= The Architects of Fear =

- The Outer Limits episode
- Episode no.: Season 1 Episode 3
- Directed by: Byron Haskin
- Written by: Meyer Dolinsky
- Cinematography by: Conrad Hall
- Production code: 5
- Original air date: September 30, 1963

Guest appearances
- Robert Culp; Leonard Stone; Martin Wolfson; Geraldine Brooks

Episode chronology
← Previous "The Hundred Days of the Dragon"	Next → "The Man with the Power"

"The Architects of Fear" is an episode of the original The Outer Limits television show. It first aired on September 30, 1963, during the first season.

== Introduction ==
Certain that the Cold War will lead to mankind's destruction, a cabal of scientists decide that they must act to save the world. A film of a nuclear missile attack with people running for shelter is shown before the plot.

== Opening narration ==
Is this the day? Is this the beginning of the end? There is no time to wonder. No time to ask why is it happening, why is it finally happening. There is time only for fear, for the piercing pain of panic. Do we pray? Or do we merely run now and pray later? Will there be a later? Or is this the day?

== Plot ==
The world has entered a Cold War-like setting in which nuclear holocaust appears imminent. In the hope of staving off an apocalyptic military confrontation, an idealistic group of scientists working at United Labs plans to stage a fake alien invasion of Earth in an effort to unite all humanity against a perceived common enemy. The scientists have managed to study the planetary conditions on the planet Theta. They draw lots, and physicist Dr. Allen Leighton is chosen to undergo radical surgical procedures that will transform him into an inhabitant from the planet Theta. Leighton's death is faked, and the bizarre series of transplants and modifications to his body proceed. His wife, Yvette, persists in not believing he is dead; she even feels sympathetic pain as Allen suffers on the operating table. Complications arise when the effects of Leighton's transformation extend beyond his physical appearance and begin to affect his mind, a situation compounded by the scientist's strong emotional connection with his now-pregnant wife.

The scientists' plan is for Leighton, as the Thetan creature equipped with an energy weapon and spaceship, to land at the United Nations in an effort to create initial panic. This panic, in theory, will be resolved as the world unites to fight the invader. Leighton, now a perfect simulation of an inhabitant of the planet Theta, is launched into orbit as a weather satellite, but the mission goes awry when the spaceship comes down off course and lands in a wooded area near the United Labs facility. After disintegrating their station wagon with his laser pistol, Allen is severely wounded by three armed hunters as he emerges from the underbrush. With nowhere else to go, Allen stumbles back to the lab. Yvette, sensing trouble, hurries to the lab looking for her husband. She arrives as Allen, now hideously transformed, enters and collapses to the floor. Before dying of mortal wounds, Allen makes a sign in the air with his hand—a sign familiar to his wife—and she then realizes the horrifying truth that the "alien" is, in fact, her husband.

== Closing narration ==
Scarecrows and magic and other fatal fears do not bring people closer together. There is no magic substitute for soft caring and hard work, for self-respect and mutual love. If we can learn this from the mistake these frightened men made, then their mistake will not have been merely grotesque; it would have been at least a lesson. A lesson, at last, to be learned.

== Censorship ==
The prosthetic suit for the monstrously altered Allen Leighton was judged by some of ABC's local affiliates to be so frightening that they broadcast a black screen during the Thetan's appearances, effectively censoring most of the show's last act. In other parts of the United States, the Thetan footage was tape-delayed until after the 11pm/10c news. In others, it was not shown at all. Unlike today, when film series are transferred to videotape for transmission, even until the mid-1980s, film series were broadcast live from the film print via telecine.

The sequence involving the Thetan's encounter with the duck hunters was shot at the Metro-Goldwyn-Mayer Backlot #3.

== Precursors ==
- Theodore Sturgeon's short story "Unite and Conquer" (1948), published in Astounding Science Fiction, turns on a similar device, humans uniting against a fake alien threat. Sturgeon used the idea again in "Occam's Scalpel" (1971), published in If (magazine).
- The Jan/Feb 1951 issue of Weird Science (#5), features the comic story, "The Last War on Earth" by Harvey Kurtzman, wherein a scientist creates a fake threat from another world — in this instance a "Martian" bomb is dropped on an American suburb — eventually uniting Earth against Mars. The story has a twist ending typical of many Weird Science stories.
- The plot also bears resemblance to the 1958 short story “The Delegate from Venus” by Henry Slesar.
- In Kurt Vonnegut's novel The Sirens of Titan (1959), a fake invasion is carried out to unite Earth and eventually leads to world peace.

== Legacy ==
- This episode is similar to the ending of Alan Moore and Dave Gibbons' comic book mini-series, Watchmen (1986–87). According to Moore, while he was writing issue 10, he came across a guide to cult television that featured this episode and was surprised by its similarity to his already planned ending. However, editor Len Wein said that "it simply stole the ending to an episode of The Outer Limits, which Alan fully admitted!" Wein found reusing the episode's ending to be unacceptable, and quit the series when Moore refused to change it. A promotional spot for "The Architects of Fear" is overheard on a television in the comic's penultimate scene. When writing the prequel series Before Watchmen: Ozymandias (2012), Wein specifically referred to this episode as the in-universe source of the idea. While the film adaptation of Watchmen (2009) omits the "space squid", the opening titles of The Outer Limits are shown on a television screen towards the end of the film. In the fifth episode of HBO's Watchmen, a direct reference is made when Adrian Veidt claims that the only weapon that can stave off mankind's extinction is fear, and subsequently claims to be its architect.
- The Showtime series The Outer Limits revisited this episode with "Afterlife" (1996), using a more alien approach to the main character, played this time by Clancy Brown. The ending in this case has the aliens coming to retrieve their new "brother" (which makes it slightly more akin to "The Chameleon" episode.
- Filmmaker Kevin Smith has stated that, before offering him the chance to write Superman Lives in 1996, Warner Bros. offered him two projects: A remake of "The Architects of Fear" and Beetlejuice Goes Hawaiian.
- In 2011, Nobel prize-winning economist Paul Krugman mentioned the episode when he said that building a defense against a fictional alien invasion could speed recovery from the late-2000s recession; however, he misattributed the episode to The Twilight Zone.

== Cast ==
- Robert Culp as Allen Leighton
- Leonard Stone as Dr. Phillip Gainer
- Geraldine Brooks as Yvette Leighton
- Martin Wolfson as Dr. Herschel
- Douglas Henderson as Dr. Paul Fredericks
- Janos Prohaska as Allen-as-Thetan
- Lee Zimmer as Carl Ford, TV announcer
- Clay Tanner as Fred, Duckhunter #1
- Hal Bokar as Bert Bolsey, Duckhunter #2
- William Bush as "Big Tom", Duckhunter #3
- Ginger the Dog
