= John M. Nickolaus Jr. =

American cinematographer (1913–1985)

- Born: John Mathew Nickolaus Jr. May 18, 1913; Bayonne, New Jersey, U.S.
- Died: February 10, 1985 (aged 71); Malibu, California, U.S.
- Occupation: Cinematographer

John Mathew Nickolaus Jr. (May 18, 1913 – February 10, 1985) was an American cinematographer.

Born in Bayonne, New Jersey. Nickolaus began his career as a camera operator for MGM in the late 1940s. By the 1950s, he was working as a director of photography in both film and television. Nickolaus then worked on such popular television series as the legal drama television series Perry Mason, the western television series Rawhide, and Gunsmoke, which starred James Arness. Together with Conrad Hall, he had helped establish the visual style of the original The Outer Limits (1963–65).

Nickolaus continued to work in television until shortly before his death in Malibu, California in 1985. He died of cancer.
