= The Outer Limits (1963 TV series) =

American anthology television series (1963–1965)

- Genre: Anthology; Science fiction; Horror; Mystery thriller
- Created by: Leslie Stevens
- Narrated by: Vic Perrin (Control Voice)
- Theme music composer: Dominic Frontiere (1963–64); Harry Lubin (1964–65)
- Country of origin: United States
- No. of seasons: 2
- No. of episodes: 49 (list of episodes)

Production
- Executive producer: Leslie Stevens
- Producers: Joseph Stefano (1963–64); Ben Brady (1964–65)
- Production locations: Metromedia Square, Los Angeles, U.S.
- Cinematography: Conrad Hall; John M. Nickolaus; Kenneth Peach
- Editor: Richard K. Brockway; Anthony DiMarco; Fred Baratta
- Running time: 51 minutes
- Production companies: Daystar Productions; Villa DiStefano Productions; United Artists Television; MGM Television

Original release
- Network: ABC
- Release: September 16, 1963 – January 16, 1965

The Outer Limits is an American anthology television series created by Leslie Stevens, that was broadcast on ABC from September 16, 1963, to January 16, 1965. It is often compared to The Twilight Zone, but features a greater emphasis on science fiction (rather than stories of fantasy or the supernatural).

The series was revived in 1995, running for seven seasons. In April 2019, a new revival was stated to be in development at a premium cable network, which never went into production.

== Overview ==
=== Introduction ===
Each show began with either a cold open or a preview clip, followed by a narration over visuals of an oscilloscope. Using an Orwellian theme of taking over your television, the earliest version of the narration was:

There is nothing wrong with your television set. Do not attempt to adjust the picture. We are controlling transmission. If we wish to make it louder, we will bring up the volume. If we wish to make it softer, we will tune it to a whisper. We will control the horizontal. We will control the vertical. We can roll the image, make it flutter. We can change the focus to a soft blur, or sharpen it to crystal clarity. For the next hour, sit quietly and we will control all that you see and hear. We repeat: There is nothing wrong with your television set. You are about to participate in a great adventure. You are about to experience the awe and mystery which reaches from the inner mind to... The Outer Limits.

A similar but shorter monologue caps each episode:

We now return control of your television set to you, until next week at this same time, when the Control Voice will take you to... The Outer Limits.

Later episodes used one of two shortened versions of the introduction. The first few episodes began simply with the title screen followed by the narration and no cold open or preview clip. The Control Voice was performed by actor Vic Perrin.

=== Production ===
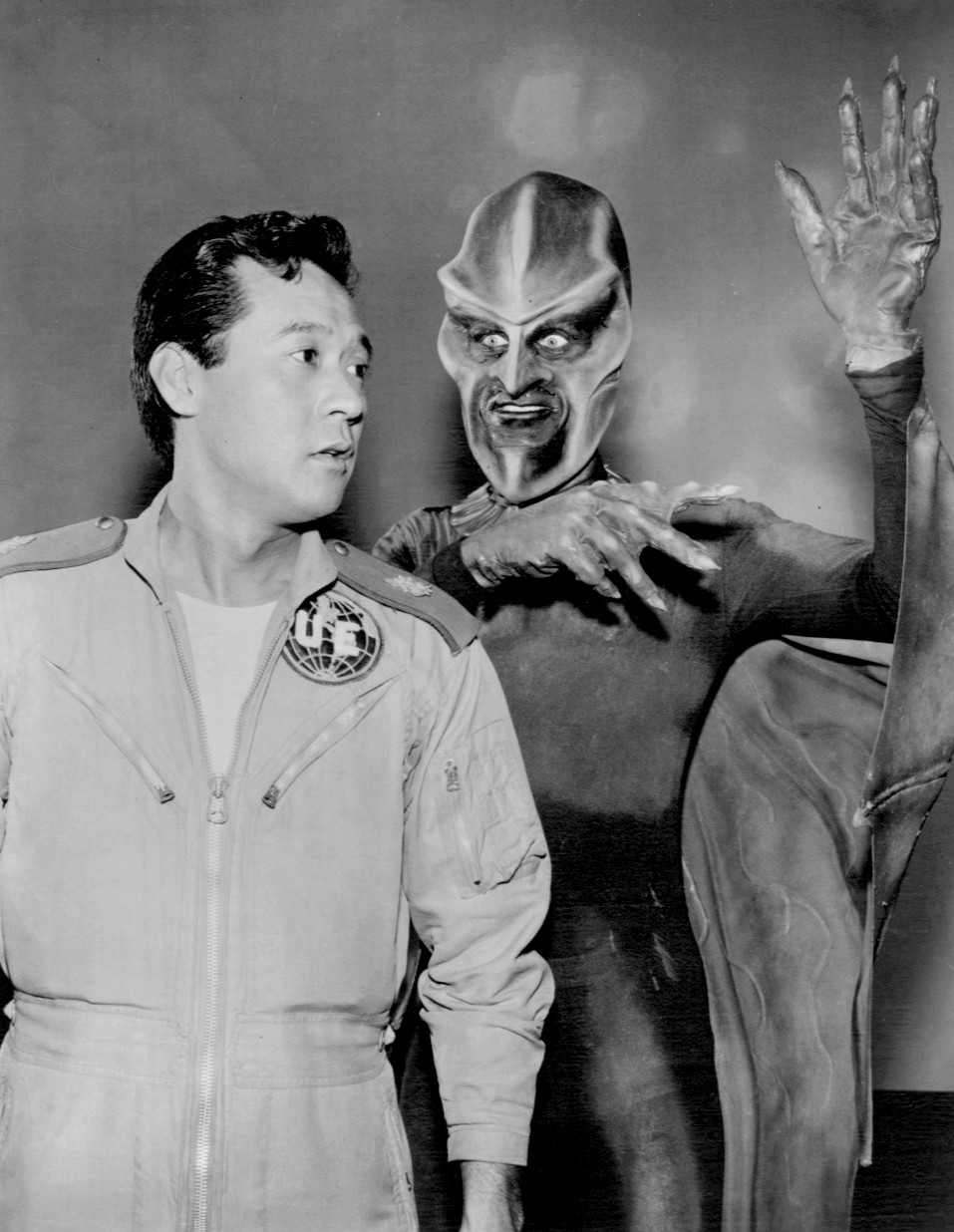
James Shigeta and John Anderson (in Ebonite costume) in the episode "Nightmare" (1963)

The Outer Limits was originally broadcast on the ABC Television Network ABC (1963–65). There were 49 episodes produced. It was one of many series influenced by The Twilight Zone and Science Fiction Theatre, though it ultimately proved influential in its own right. In the unaired pilot, it was called Please Stand By, but ABC rejected that title. Series creator Leslie Stevens retitled it The Outer Limits. With a few changes, the pilot aired as the premiere episode, "The Galaxy Being".

Writers included creator Stevens and Joseph Stefano (screenwriter of the film Psycho), who was the Season 1 producer and creative guiding force, and who wrote more of the series' episodes than anyone. Future Oscar-winning screenwriter Robert Towne (Chinatown) wrote "The Chameleon", the final Season 1 episode. A pair of Season 2 episodes, "Soldier" and "Demon with a Glass Hand", were written by Harlan Ellison. The latter won a Writers' Guild Award.

Writer Joseph Stefano was recruited in a late night phone call from Leslie Stevens; the two men had known each other for years. Stevens met him with composer/producer Dominic Frontiere and pitched the series to him asking him to come on as a writer and producer. Stefano, who had never produced before, felt reassured by Associate Producer Robert H. Justman to support him as Justman had experience in TV.

Season 1 combined science fiction and horror, while Season 2 was more focused on 'hard science fiction' stories, dropping the recurring "scary monster" motif of Season 1. Each episode in Season 1 was to have a monster or creature as a critical part of the story line in a villain of the week format. Season 1 writer and producer Joseph Stefano believed this element was necessary to provide fear, suspense, or at least a center for plot development. This kind of story element became known as "the bear". This device was, however, mostly dropped in Season 2 after Stefano left.

Two Season 1 episodes without a "bear" are "The Forms of Things Unknown" and "Controlled Experiment", the first of which was shot in a dual format as science fiction for The Outer Limits and as a thriller for a pilot for an unmade series, The Unknown. Actor Barry Morse, who starred in "Controlled Experiment", states that it was made as a pilot for an unrealized science fiction/comedy series. It was the only comedic episode of The Outer Limits.

Earlier Season 1 episodes with no "bear" were "The Hundred Days of the Dragon" and "The Borderland", made before the "bear" convention was established. Season 2 episodes with a "bear" are "Keeper of the Purple Twilight", "The Duplicate Man", "Wolf 359" and "The Probe". "Bears" appear near the conclusion of the Season 2 episodes "Counterweight", "The Invisible Enemy", and "Cold Hands, Warm Heart". The "bear" in "The Architects of Fear", the monstrously altered Allen Leighton, was judged by some of ABC's local affiliate stations to be so frightening that they broadcast a black screen during the "Thetan's" appearances, effectively censoring most of the show's last act. In other parts of the United States, the "Thetan" footage was tape-delayed until after the 11pm/10c news. In others, it was not shown at all.

The series was shot at KTTV (Metromedia Square), Hollywood, California on sound stage # 2. Season 1 had music by Dominic Frontiere, who doubled as Production Executive; Season 2 featured music by Harry Lubin, with a variation of his Fear theme for One Step Beyond being heard over the end titles.

=== Cinematography ===
The program sometimes made use of techniques (lighting, camerawork, even make-up) associated with film noir or German Expressionism (see for example, "Corpus Earthling"). Credit for this is often given to the cinematographer Conrad Hall, who later won three Academy Awards for his work in motion pictures. Hall shot 15 episodes during the first two-thirds of the first season, the series' other cinematographers included John M. Nickolaus and Kenneth Peach.

=== Special effects ===
Season 1's monsters and creatures, and most props, were developed by a loose-knit group under the name Project Unlimited, whose members included Wah Chang, Gene Warren and Jim Danforth. Makeup effects were by Fred B. Phillips and John Chambers.

The season 2 episode "Wolf 359" featured a "bear" consisting of a piece of latex rubber, eight wooden tongue depressors and a styrofoam ball. These items were attached to a mime's hands and shot against a black background.

=== Characters and models ===
Many of the creatures that appeared in Outer Limits episodes were sold as models and action figures in the 1990s and 2000s. Limited-editions model kits, to be assembled and painted by the purchaser, were issued by Dimensional Designs. A smaller set of out-of-the-box action figures were sold in larger quantity by Sideshow Toys. The former produced a model kit of The Megasoid from "The Duplicate Man", and both created a figure of Gwyllm as an evolved man from "The Sixth Finger".

== Reception and reputation ==
The Outer Limits was originally broadcast on ABC from September 16, 1963, to January 16, 1965, at 7:30 PM Eastern Time on Mondays.

The series earned a loyal audience in its first season. Some viewers were reported to take TV sets with them if they had to be away from home, so they would not miss an episode. However, the second season fared rather poorly in the Nielsen ratings after moving from Monday to Saturday night, where it competed with Jackie Gleason's eponymous variety show. Producer Joseph Stefano chose to leave the show after the first year; he realized that competing with the more popular Gleason would kill his show (proven by its cancellation midway through the second season). However, the series retained a following for many years after its original broadcast. Many decades later, horror writer Stephen King described it as one of the best programs of its type to run on network TV.

Originally scheduled to air on November 25, 1963, the episode "Nightmare" was delayed until December 2 due to television coverage of the state funeral of President John F. Kennedy.

In 1997, the episode "The Zanti Misfits" was ranked #98 on TV Guide's 100 Greatest Episodes of All Time.

=== Comparison to The Twilight Zone ===
Like The Twilight Zone, The Outer Limits had an opening and closing narration in almost every episode. Both shows were unusually philosophical for science fiction anthology series, but differed in style. The Twilight Zone stories were often like parables, employing whimsy (such as the Buster Keaton time-travel episode "Once Upon a Time"), irony, or extraordinary problem-solving situations (such as the episode "The Arrival"). The Outer Limits was usually a straight action-and-suspense show which often had the human spirit in confrontation with dark existential forces from within or without, such as in the alien abduction episode "A Feasibility Study" or the alien possession story "The Invisibles". The Outer Limits was also known for the moody, textured look of many episodes (especially those directed by Byron Haskin or Gerd Oswald, or photographed by Conrad Hall) whereas The Twilight Zone tended to be shot more conventionally.

There is common ground between some of the shows' episodes. As David J. Schow and Jeffrey Frentzen, authors of The Outer Limits: The Official Companion, have noted, several Outer Limits episodes are often misremembered by casual fans as Twilight Zone episodes—notably, "problem-solving" episodes such as "Fun and Games" and "The Premonition".

== Legacy ==
=== Links to Star Trek ===
A few of the monsters from The Outer Limits reappeared in Gene Roddenberry's Star Trek series later in the 1960s. The moving microbe beast in "The Probe" was modified and used as the 'Horta' in "The Devil in the Dark", operated by the same actor, Janos Prohaska. The "ion storm" from "The Mutant" (a projector beam shining through a container containing glitter in liquid suspension) became the transporter effect in Star Trek. The black mask from "The Duplicate Man" was used by the character Dr. Leighton in "The Conscience of the King". The Megasoid from "The Duplicate Man" and the Empyrean from "Second Chance" (1964) were briefly seen near Captain Christopher Pike in other cages in the Star Trek pilot "The Cage". Most significantly, the process used to make pointed ears for David McCallum in "The Sixth Finger" was reused for Mr. Spock.

Lead actors who later appeared in Star Trek's regular cast included Leonard Nimoy, who appeared in two Outer Limits episodes ("Production and Decay of Strange Particles" and "I, Robot"); and William Shatner, who appeared in the episode "Cold Hands, Warm Heart" as an astronaut working on a Project Vulcan. Other actors who subsequently appeared on Star Trek were Grace Lee Whitney (episode "Controlled Experiment") and James Doohan (episode "Expanding Human"). Roddenberry was often present in The Outer Limits' studios, and hired several of its staff, including Robert H. Justman and Wah Chang, for Star Trek. Michael Ansara, who appeared in the Outer Limits episode "Soldier", guest-starred as Klingon commander Kang in the original and spin-off Star Trek series. Arlene Martel, who appeared in the Outer Limits episode "Demon with a Glass Hand", guest-starred as Spock's Vulcan bride, T'Pring, in "Amok Time". Joseph Ruskin, who appeared with Nimoy in "Production and Decay of Strange Particles", later went on to play Galt, the lead Thrall in "The Gamesters of Triskelion".

Writers Meyer Dolinsky and Harlan Ellison each wrote scripts for both series.

=== Lawsuit on behalf of Harlan Ellison ===
Harlan Ellison contended that inspiration for James Cameron's The Terminator (1984) came in part from Ellison's work on The Outer Limits. Orion Pictures conceded the influence, and Ellison was awarded money and an end-credits mention in The Terminator, stating the creators' wish of "acknowledgement to the works of Harlan Ellison." Cameron was against Orion's decision and was told that if he did not agree with the settlement, they would have Cameron pay for any damages if Orion lost Ellison's suit. Cameron replied that he "had no choice but to agree with the settlement. There was a gag order as well."

=== Film adaptation projects ===
Filmmaker Kevin Smith has stated that, before offering him the chance to write Superman Lives in 1996, Warner Bros. offered him two projects: a remake of The Architects of Fear and Beetlejuice Goes Hawaiian. In 2001, MGM made plans with Mark Victor and Michael Grais to produce a film adaptation of The Outer Limits. Development began a year later with Gerald Di Pego co-writing with his sons Justin and Zachary, and Rupert Wainwright directing. A new adaptation was developed in 2010, with Patrick Melton and Marcus Dunstan writing and Jonathan Shestack producing.

On June 20, 2014, The Hollywood Reporter said Metro-Goldwyn-Mayer was developing a film version of The Outer Limits episode "Demon with a Glass Hand" written by Scott Derrickson and C. Robert Cargill, with Mark Victor producing.

=== 1990s revival ===
The Outer Limits was revived in 1995, running for seven seasons on Showtime (1995-2001) and the Sci-Fi Channel (2001-2002).

=== Proposed television revival ===
On April 1, 2019, Variety reported that an Outer Limits reboot was in development at a premium cable network, though no such project went into production.

=== In popular culture ===
- Steve Streeter published The Outer Limits Newsletter from 1978 to 1983 and founded the Outer Limits Fan Club in 1978.
- In the 1995 film Hackers, protagonist Dade Murphy hacks a local TV station switching its current programing to an episode of The Outer Limits.
- In the season 2 episode of Gilmore Girls "It Should've Been Lorelai" the character Luke Danes mentions the series after Lorelai mentions The Twilight Zone, noting how it was a great show that was just as eerie and of the same era.
- The lyrics to the 2014 Hardstyle-EDM hit ''We control the sound'', by the duo W&W and hardstyle dj Headhunterz, references The Outer Limits' cold-open narration:

There's nothing wrong with your sound system, do not attempt to adjust the volume
We are now controlling transmissions

- In the 2018 animated film Incredibles 2, the opening scene from The Outer Limits is briefly shown on a television screen. It is hinted that the film is set in the year 1963, when The Outer Limits first aired.

== Episodes ==
Season	Episodes	Originally released	
Season	Episodes	First released	Last released
1	32	September 16, 1963	May 4, 1964
2	17	September 19, 1964	January 16, 1965

== Home media ==
=== LaserDisc release ===
From 1990 to 1995, four LaserDisc boxed sets were released. A total of twenty-nine of the forty-nine episodes were released on this format.

=== VHS release ===
A "platinum" version of the MGM/UA Library brand product of the video series was released.

=== DVD releases ===
MGM Home Entertainment has released both seasons of The Outer Limits on DVD in Region 1. In 2007, they re-released the series in three separate sets. In October 2008, MGM released a 7-disc box set featuring all 49 episodes of the series. The re-releases of Season 2 correctly claim three discs in the set on the outer packaging, whereas the individual slim cases with the DVDs inside rather confusingly claim only two.

DVD name	Episodes	Region 1 Release date	Region 2 Release date
Season 1	32	September 3, 2002	July 11, 2005
Season 2	17	September 2, 2003	July 25, 2005
The Complete Series	49	October 21, 2008	–

- The DVDs include a revised version of the original intro, heard over the episode menus:

There is nothing wrong with your DVD player. Do not attempt to adjust the picture. We are controlling your DVD player. We already control the horizontal and the vertical. We now control the digital. We can change the focus from a soft blur to crystal clarity. Sit quietly and we will control all that you see and hear. You are about to experience the awe and mystery which reaches from the inner mind to... The Outer Limits.

- The episodes "The Invisible Enemy" and "Wolf 359" are erroneously listed on one DVD case ("The Outer Limits Volume Three The Original Series Disc 1 Episodes 33–40") in "The Outer Limits The Complete Original Series Volumes 1–3." Both episodes are actually only on Disc 2 included in the case for "The Outer Limits Volume Three The Original Series Discs 2–3 Episodes 39–49."

=== Blu-ray release ===
On 27 March 2018, Kino Lorber released the first season on Blu-ray. The 7-disc set contains the 32 episodes of the first season. The second season was released 20 November 2018, but the episode "Soldier" had audio defects. A replacement disc was sent out from Kino in April 2019.

On Jun 24, 2020, Australia's Via Vision Entertainment released The Outer Limits: Complete Original Series Collector's Edition 11-disc Blu-ray set. It's coded for region B and comes in a hard box case with a 60-page Illustrated booklet, with essays by leading Outer Limits expert and author David J. Schow.

== See also ==
- Incubus (film)
- The Outer Limits (1995 TV series)
- List of The Outer Limits (1995 TV series) episodes
- Science fiction on television

=== Similar TV series ===
- 13 Demon Street
- Alcoa Presents One Step Beyond
- Alfred Hitchcock Presents
- Amazing Stories
- Are You Afraid of the Dark?
- Black Mirror
- Chillers
- Darkroom
- Eerie, Indiana
- Fear Itself
- Goosebumps
- Lights Out
- Masters of Horror
- Masters of Science Fiction
- Monsters
- Night Gallery
- Out of the Unknown
- Out of This World
- Out There
- Round the Twist
- Science Fiction Theatre
- Suspense
- Tales from the Crypt
- Tales from the Darkside
- Tales of the Unexpected
- Tales of Tomorrow
- The Hitchhiker
- The Ray Bradbury Theater
- The Twilight Zone (1959 TV series)
- The Twilight Zone (1985 TV series)
- The Twilight Zone (2002 TV series)
- The Twilight Zone (2019 TV series)
- The Veil
- Thriller
- Ultra Q
- Way Out
- Welcome to Paradox

=== Other articles ===
- Outer Limits Galaxy
