= Kenneth Peach =

American cinematographer

- Born: Kenneth D. Peach, Sr. March 6, 1903; El Reno, Oklahoma, U.S.
- Died: February 27, 1988 (aged 84); Los Angeles, California, U.S.
- Occupation: Cinematographer
- Years active: 1923–1984
- Spouse: Pauline Curley (m. 1922)
- Children: 3

Kenneth D. Peach, Sr. (March 6, 1903 – February 27, 1988) was an American cinematographer.

== Biography ==
Kenneth D. Peach Sr. was born in El Reno, Indian Territory (in what is now Oklahoma). Peach entered the film industry in 1923 and became a director of photography in 1926. He worked with composite processes, miniatures, montages and matte shots for Tiffany Pictures for two years, then joined Fred Jackman's technical effects department at Warner Bros.- First National for three years. In 1931, he joined RKO Pictures' special effects department. In 1933, he began a long association with producer Hal Roach of Hal Roach Studios, where he shot several Laurel and Hardy films (Dirty Work, Sons of the Desert). In his later career, he worked in both film and television, in TV series such as Lassie (73 episodes, 1958–1960), The Outer Limits (25 episodes, 1964–1965), H.R. Pufnstuf (17 episodes, 1969–1970), Taxi (59 episodes, 1980–1983), before retiring in 1984.

He was married to actress Pauline Curley from 1922 until his death. They had three children: Kenneth Peach, Jr., a cinematographer; Martin Peach, a key grip on the Disney television series, Wizards of Waverly Place; and a daughter, Pauline A. Reynolds.

Peach died on February 27, 1988, at the age of 84. He and his wife Pauline (who died on December 16, 2000) are buried together in the Lincoln Terrace section of Forest Lawn-Hollywood Hills Cemetery in Los Angeles, California.
