= List of The Outer Limits (1995 TV series) episodes =

This page is a list of the episodes of The Outer Limits, a 1995 science fiction/dark fantasy television series. The series was broadcast on Showtime from 1995 to 2000, and on the Sci Fi Channel in its final year (2001–2002).

== Background ==
Showtime's head of programming, Jeffrey Offsay, said the show "found a home at Showtime because MGM, which produced the original series, supplies feature films to both Showtime and The Movie Channel. At the time we were making our deal to get into business with them, they were restarting their TV operation as well. They had the idea of wanting to make The Outer Limits and they thought it was the kind of thing that would work very well for us". Executive producer Pen Densham noted how anthologies can be "risky". He explained that "every week no stories are the same, no actors are the same, we don't have an easy path of an ongoing character, we have to make sure the stories are so strong, and not resort to remaking original Outer Limits scripts". All but one of the 43 episodes in season 1 and season 2 are originals, the only remake is 'I Robot', which starred Leonard Nimoy in the original, and he also appears in the new episode. The premiere episode, "The Sandkings", featured Lloyd Bridges, his son Beau Bridges, and Beau's son Dylan Bridges.

In 2000, Showtime cancelled the series after 132 episodes. The show was then revived on the Sci-Fi Channel in 2001, with the first episode featuring Tom Arnold, premiering on March 16, 2001. Two of the executive producers at Showtime, Pen Densham and Mark Stern, also returned for the revival of the series. After one season, the Sci-Fi Channel cancelled the show in 2002, primarily due to declining viewership ratings.

== Series overview ==
Season	Episodes	Originally released		
Season	Episodes	First released	Last released	Network
1	21	March 26, 1995	August 20, 1995	Showtime
2	22	January 14, 1996	August 4, 1996	Showtime
3	18	January 19, 1997	July 25, 1997	Showtime
4	26	January 23, 1998	December 18, 1998	Showtime
5	22	January 22, 1999	August 20, 1999	Showtime
6	21	January 21, 2000	September 3, 2000	Showtime
7	22	March 16, 2001	January 18, 2002	Sci Fi

== Episodes ==
=== Season 1 (1995) ===
No. overall	No. in season	Title	Directed by	Written by	Original release date
1	1	"The Sandkings"	Stuart Gillard	Based on the work by : George R. R. Martin; Teleplay by : Melinda Snodgrass	March 26, 1995
Dr. Simon Kress's (Beau Bridges) research for the government on Martian life is aborted because one of his specimens almost escapes into the natural environment. However, Kress does not agree with the abandonment of the project and decides to continue his experiments in his barn. He strongly believes that the insect-like species is actually sentient. He steals some sand containing Martian eggs from his lab and creates a makeshift incubator to hatch more of the Martian lifeforms. In the meantime, Kress deals with growing discord with his wife (Helen Shaver) over financial troubles, his obsession with work and the stress of concealing the stolen Martian lifeforms from his former supervisors at the government lab. Kress comes to believe that he is a god to his sandkings when they erect sand structures that resemble his face. Bitten by one of the sandkings, his obsession peaks as he alienates his wife, son, father (Lloyd Bridges), and kills his former supervisor by throwing him in the sandking incubator, where the creatures—already starved by Kress as an experiment—quickly devour him. In the end, Kress attempts to destroy all the sandkings but fails. In the epilogue of the episode, a colony of sandkings is shown surviving in the wilderness. Note: The series premiere, this was a double length single episode, later broken into Part 1 and Part 2 for subsequent rebroadcasts and syndication.
2	2	"Valerie 23"	Timothy Bond	James Gwyther	March 31, 1995
Valerie 23 (Sofia Shinas) is the latest development from the Innobotics Corporation, and she is designed to be an attractive, helpful and perfect companion for a disabled man. While being an ideal test candidate, due to his condition and qualifications, Frank Hellner (William Sadler) is reluctant to take part, and he initially wants nothing to do with Valerie. Eventually, he agrees to a one-week test period where Valerie proves to be an excellent caregiver and more. Over the course of the test, Valerie becomes increasingly affectionate and Frank eventually gives in. After the sexual encounter, Frank explains to Valerie that he thinks it was a mistake, as he has begun to grow closer to his physiotherapist Rachel (Nancy Allen). Valerie responds to this by displaying more human traits such as anger and envy. After following Frank and Rachel on a rock climbing outing, Valerie attempts to dispose of her rival but is shut down before being returned to Innobotics. Frank decides that he must speak to Valerie before she is dismantled, and Valerie explains her feelings for Frank and tries unsuccessfully to rekindle their relationship. Later, Valerie escapes, follows Frank and again tries to kill Rachel. Frank is forced to destroy Valerie with an electric shock, but, as she lies dying, Valerie tells him that she is afraid to die.
3	3	"Blood Brothers"	Tibor Takacs	James Gwyther	April 7, 1995
Spencer Deighton (Charles Martin Smith) spends his time working on cures for serious illnesses, while his brother Michael pushes for the development of more lucrative drugs. Spencer begins a romantic relationship with a reporter, Tricia (Kate Vernon). Spencer makes a breakthrough and finds what appears to be a wonder drug, Deighton C, capable of curing virtually any disease. He decides to announce his breakthrough and make the research available to the world for further research. Michael disagrees and sees the opportunity to keep it secret and limit its use to the rich and powerful. When Carl (Tom Cavanagh), Spencer's research assistant, attempts to smuggle the drug out of the laboratory, Michael kills him. Assuming that Spencer must have told Tricia about the drug he attempts to kill her too, but fails. Michael uses the drug on himself and attempts to kill both Spencer and Tricia but they manage to escape. For Michael, Deighton C is not the wonder drug he had hoped for—and its side effects are deadly.
4	4	"The Second Soul"	Paul Lynch	Alan Brennert	April 14, 1995
A dying race of aliens has come to Earth to stop its own extinction...by reanimating human corpses. The N'Tal do not have bodies of their own; instead, they require hosts to live, but they have the technology to reanimate, cure and occupy the bodies of the recently dead. It appears that the N'Tal are conspiring to change the Earth's atmosphere to their own advantage, while killing all humans. However, it is eventually revealed that the N'Tal have built an enclosed replica of their home planet, so that their children, who will be fully human, can know the history of the N'Tal homeworld.
5	5	"White Light Fever"	Tibor Takacs	David Kemper	April 21, 1995
Harlan Hawkes' (William Hickey) heart fails again and he sees himself moving down a tunnel of light. His personal physician, Dr. McEnerney (Bruce Davison), rushes to the scene and resuscitates him just in time. A mysterious blue energy appears near Hawkes' body and moves into the electrical systems of the room. Although Hawkes is still alive, his heart is badly damaged, and the artificial heart being developed by McEnerney will not be ready in time. Hawkes threatens to pull funding from the artificial heart project unless he is moved to the front of the queue for the next available donor heart. This puts Dr. McEnerney in a difficult moral situation. Losing funding for the artificial heart project could mean the loss of a system that could save thousands of lives. To keep the funding, he must give priority to a ruthless, cold elderly man who has already had a full life. The situation is even more difficult because Jesse, the future sister-in-law of his colleague, Dr. Anne Crain, is only eighteen and needs a heart transplant to live. The blue energy released during Hawkes' last resuscitation begins to try to kill Hawkes. McEnerney realizes that keeping Hawkes alive beyond his time has serious consequences and refuses Hawkes' request to be given priority. Both of the prospective heart recipients—Hawkes and the young girl—die. Hawkes sees the girl inside the tunnel of light and realizes that their future paths are very different. The girl comments that where she is going is warm and that she expected it to be "the other way around". It is implied that she goes to Heaven while he descends into the depths of Hell.
6	6	"The Choice"	Mark Sobel	Ann Lewis Hamilton	April 28, 1995
A young girl, Aggie Travers (Thora Birch), is an outcast at her elementary school, and mysterious things happen to people when she does not get along with them. Since it appears that she is responsible for these strange things, she is suspended from school. Her parents (Page Fletcher and Sandra Nelson) are at their wit's end, so they decide to look for a nanny for their troubled child. Karen Ross (Megan Follows), their first candidate, seems perfect; she bonds with Aggie from the start, and seems to understand her special needs.
7	7	"Virtual Future"	Joseph L. Scanlan	Shawn Alex Thompson	May 5, 1995
Despite a breakthrough in his virtual reality research, Jack (Josh Brolin) finally loses grant funding. Bill Trenton (David Warner), the rich owner of a research company, hires him to a lucrative contract with a well-equipped laboratory to continue his work. Trenton tries the virtual reality suit, and he "jumps" a few hours into the future, seeing a newspaper headline about a woman killed at an ATM. Trenton saves the life of the woman whose death he saw reported, proving that it is possible to alter the future. Jack eventually extends the range of his "jumps" even farther into the future, and he sees his own body floating in the ocean. Trenton begins secretly making plans to profit from the device by using it to win a United States Senate election. Trenton, via another "jump", sees himself losing the election and being subpoenaed by the incumbent winner of the race. Jack eventually tells his wife, Isabelle (Kelly Rowan), about the suit, its capabilities, and what he has seen. He takes another trip into the future to find out more about the circumstances of his death and sees Trenton murdering him. Trenton breaks into the lab, and Jack is forced to flee. Trenton follows him and, just as he is about to shoot Jack on a waterfront pier, Isabelle comes to Jack's aid.
8	8	"Living Hell"	Graeme Campbell	Story by : Pen Densham and Melinda Snodgrass; Teleplay by : Melinda Snodgrass	May 12, 1995
Brought to the hospital with a gunshot wound to the head, Ben Kohler's (Sam Robards) only chance, according to Dr. Jennifer Martinez (Elizabeth Pena), is her experimental brain–computer interface Cerebral Chip (the CCI2). A month later, Kohler experiences a horrible vision that he is chasing a woman in the forest and reaches out to attack her. Later, Kohler has another vision in which the woman from the forest is now dead; this time the killer speaks to Kohler, taunting him. Kohler calls the police and is told by a detective that such a murder has actually occurred. Kohler hangs up without giving his name when he realizes that the police will just convict him based on his knowledge of the crimes. Kohler turns to Dr. Martinez for help and eventually witnesses another murder where the killer speaks to him. Dr. Martinez and Kohler realize that the CCI2 is communicating with a CCI chip from the first series of experimental surgeries. The killer is Wayne Haas, who was thought to be dead, and Kohler and Martinez go to his house. At Haas' house, they find another body, and, as Kohler collapses in another vision, Haas kidnaps Dr. Martinez. The police storm Haas' house and arrest Kohler; after some interrogation, hospital records show that Kohler could not be the killer because he was in surgery and recovery during the first two killings. Another vision leads the police and Kohler to a low-rent motel, where Kohler tries to capture Haas and save Martinez.
9	9	"Corner of the Eye"	Stuart Gillard	James Gwyther	May 19, 1995
A priest (Len Cariou) begins to see horrific demonic creatures among the ordinary population. They are aliens that have the powers to alter their appearance and to heal the sick.
10	10	"Under the Bed"	René Bonnière	Lawrence Meyers	May 26, 1995
When a little boy is abducted and eaten, the only witness, his little sister, claims that the Boogie Man under his bed took him. The police officer leading the case (Barbara Williams) is approached by a child psychiatrist drawn to the case (Timothy Busfield) due to how it mirrors the abduction of his own brother from his childhood, and suspects something supernatural at work. After an attempt is made to abduct the young girl, the pair find clues that may support the psychiatrist's beliefs. Researching folklore monsters and cross referencing cold cases of missing persons and abductions, the two deduce they are dealing with a shapeshifting bogeyman that only comes out of hiding at night, when there is no moonlight, to abduct and eat children. Realizing there is no moon out, they race to the girl's house, but arrive too late, as the creature abducts her. The two pursue them into an abandoned mine just as dawn is breaking. There they struggle with the creature and force it in to the sunlight. The creature solidifies into stone and the psychiatrist smashes it with a sledgehammer. Meanwhile in Paris, a similar beast is suggested to be hiding under a child's bed.
11	11	"Dark Matters"	Paul Lynch	Alan Brennert	June 2, 1995
A commercial transport vessel on a routine mission led by Commander Lydia Manning (Annette O'Toole) is suddenly forced out of hyperspace into a black and starless void.
12	12	"The Conversion"	Rebecca De Mornay	Based on the short story "Two Strangers" by : Richard B. Lewis; Teleplay by : Brad Wright	June 9, 1995
Henry Marshall (Frank Whaley) participates in a real estate scam and is caught. After a long stretch in prison, he still has not learned to value people more than money.
13	13	"Quality of Mercy"	Brad Turner	Brad Wright	June 16, 1995
In the future, humanity is losing an interstellar war against a technologically-advanced race. Major John Skokes (Robert Patrick), a prisoner of the aliens, is thrown into a cell, where he encounters another captive - a young female cadet (Nicole de Boer). She reveals that their captors are apparently grafting alien skin onto her body a bit at a time. Skokes tries to escape from their cell through an overhead vent, but his attempt fails at first when he is attacked by something lurking in the vents. Skokes makes a second attempt to escape through the air ducts, but an alien guard severs his hand before Skokes is knocked out. As their situation appears bleak, Skokes attempts to raise his fellow prisoner's spirits by telling her of a top secret plan to launch a sneak attack that might turn the tide of the war. Suddenly, a guard enters the cell, and she willingly leaves, revealing that she is really an alien spy who is actually being slowly transformed back into her original form. Note: The story concludes in episode 18 of season 2, "The Light Brigade".
14	14	"The New Breed"	Mario Azzopardi	Grant Rosenberg	June 23, 1995
Dr. Stephen Ledbetter (Richard Thomas) makes a technological and medical breakthrough when he creates a type of tiny machine, known as nanobots, capable of curing any disease or imperfections in the human body.
15	15	"The Voyage Home"	Tibor Takacs	Grant Rosenberg	June 30, 1995
The Mars III crewed expedition to Mars is in its 315th and final day when the crew discover a cave containing strange alien writing and a capsule. The capsule suddenly opens and the crew is knocked unconscious. When awakening, the three men (Jay O. Sanders, Michael Dorn and Matt Craven) begin the voyage home. The captain, however, notices strange and aggressive behaviour in one crew member. And after discovering he is an alien imposter, flushes him out the airlock. But soon the captain discovers the other crew member is also an alien. The imposter calls a truce, stating they only wish to survive, and a minimum of two are needed to land the ship. The captain is swayed with the cure to cancer, securing his name in history. But upon final entry to Earth, the captain realizes the danger he is putting humanity in, and destroys the ship, killing himself and the alien.
16	16	"Caught in the Act"	Mark Sobel	Robert Forsyth	July 9, 1995
Jay (Jason London) and Hannah (Alyssa Milano) are in love, but she wants to stay celibate until marriage. An object falls into Hannah's room and an alien entity merges with her. The alien needs her to have sex, but random males morph into her body during the intercourse. Thinking that Jay is in danger while in her presence, Hannah shuns him. Jay and his professor start an investigation regarding her. As more men vanish, the police pursue Hannah, who is "caught in the act" devouring a man. A cop shoots her, but the wound quickly heals. When the lovers are reunited, Jay, convinced that the alien needs something more than sex, makes love with Hannah and pupated alien finally rises from her body, and leaves. Note: this episode was used as the premiere when the series was first aired in the UK.
17	17	"The Message"	Joseph L. Scanlan	Brad Wright	July 16, 1995
Jennifer Winter (Marlee Matlin), deaf since birth, has had a revolutionary implant placed in her ear to help her hear for the first time. The device does not help her to hear normal conversation and sounds, but she does hear something and no one believes her. While on a routine visit to the hospital to check on the implant, Jennifer befriends the janitor, Robert (Larry Drake), who empathizes with her. Jennifer is plagued by nightmares and searing pain in her head, all at 3:10 in the morning or afternoon. In order to ease the pain, she begins furiously writing in binary code. Robert suggests that perhaps the binary code's 0's and 1's might be able to be translated. As a former astrophysicist who had mental problems that forced him to work as a janitor, he enters the code into his computer to try to translate it. Meanwhile, Jennifer's husband Sam, concerned for his wife and their young baby, is convinced that Jennifer is going crazy. As the sounds and dreams become more pronounced over time, Jennifer and Robert are determined to break the code. What they discover is an alien force, trying to communicate a cry for help through Jennifer's implant. The aliens are in a ship hurtling toward the Sun, and they need help to save their ship. The message sent was really instructions for a high energy laser designed to help push the ship out of a terminal path. Robert builds it, and Jennifer activates it just in time to see the ship pushed away towards safety.
18	18	"I, Robot"	Adam Nimoy	Based on the short story by : Eando Binder; Teleplay by : Alison Lea Bingeman	July 23, 1995
Dr. Link is working on the central memory of a robot, Adam, when it suddenly activates and attacks him. A lab assistant enters the room in time to see Adam smashing up the laboratory before crashing through a window and escaping, while Dr. Link is left dead. Later, a police officer finds Adam in a back alley, and Adam, apparently remembering nothing of the incident, asks the officer to contact Dr. Link. Adam is taken to a cell and preparations are made to disassemble it. Mina, Dr. Link's daughter, contacts a lawyer, Thurman Cutler (Leonard Nimoy), who pushes for a murder trial, insisting that Adam is his client and not simply a machine. A court hearing begins, and the prosecutor pushes for dismissal of the case on the grounds that Adam is just a machine. Cutler argues that, although Adam is clearly not human, it possesses intelligence and will, and, on that basis, deserves a trial. Cutler begins to look into Dr. Link's financial records and finds that he was working for a defense contractor, eventually discovering that Dr. Link was working to turn Adam into a weapon. Cutler argues, with supporting evidence of financial accounts and company memos, that Dr. Link was forced into attempting to rewrite Adam's central programming, effectively lobotomizing it, and that Adam reacted in the way any human might when faced with death. The court eventually finds that Adam is a person and will stand trial for the murder of Dr. Link. As it is being led away, Adam sees the prosecuting attorney in danger of being run over and rescues her, sacrificing its own life in the process. Note: Leonard Nimoy, father of co-director Adam Nimoy, co-stars in both this episode and the 1960s Outer Limits version of "I, Robot" as different characters. Neither version has any connection to the famous "I, Robot" stories of Isaac Asimov.
19	19	"If These Walls Could Talk"	Tibor Takacs	Manny Coto	July 30, 1995
A woman (Alberta Watson) asks physicist skeptic Dr. Leviticus Mitchell (Dwight Schultz) to investigate a haunted house where her son (Ryan Reynolds) and his girlfriend were last seen. Is the house really haunted, or is there something more sinister taking place?
20	20	"Birthright"	William Fruet	Eric Estrin and Michael Berlin	August 13, 1995
Senator Richard Adams (Perry King) is at the top of his game, and, after a press conference extolling the virtues of a new fuel additive BE-85 which is supposed to clean up the atmosphere, he and his aide, Evan Branch, are in a serious auto accident. Branch is dead, Adams has a head injury, and his attending physician Dr. Leslie McKenna (Mimi Kuzyk) is baffled by his unusual x-rays that show four frontal lobes and only three major organs. Before Adams can figure out what happened, a large security detail whisks him and his files away to the Sendrax Corporation, the home of BE-85. It turns out that Adams is part of a secret alien presence on Earth, and, because the alien's body make up is different, long-term use of BE-85 will xenoform the Earth's atmosphere so it is poisonous to humans but compatible with the aliens. Adams realizes that he is in danger and escapes to see McKenna, the only person he can trust. Together, they unlock the secret of Adams' identity and the horror of the alien master plan, divulging the secret of BE-85 to Kyle Haller (Scott Swanson), an aggressive young reporter. Before Haller can expose the aliens, he is killed and McKenna is framed for the murder.
21	21	"The Voice of Reason"	Neill Fearnley	Teleplay by : Brad Wright; Excerpts by : Manny Coto, Eric Estrin and Michael Berlin, Rob Forsyth, Grant Rosenberg, David Schow and Melinda Snodgrass	August 20, 1995
In this clip show, Randall Strong (Gordon Clapp) tries to convince the members of a government committee that a number of different alien invasions of Earth are occurring, and he demands an official investigation and response to these threats. His evidence comes from incidents in previous episodes of the first season: the experiments of Simon Kress in "The Sandkings"; an attempt to impersonate the crew of a spacecraft returning to Earth in "The Voyage Home"; an alien parasite in "Caught in the Act"; an alien enzyme in "If These Walls Could Talk"; aliens posing as religious messengers in "Corner of the Eye". Strong also eventually believes that the committee itself has been infiltrated by one or more aliens posing as humans (see "Birthright"). The episode "The New Breed" is also referenced, though as counter-evidence that bizarre occurrences are not necessarily a result of alien interference. During the meeting, it appears that the committee chairman, Thornwell (Daniel J. Travanti), is an alien infiltrator because of his opposition to Strong's evidence and claims. The committee adjourns for a private conference to discuss their decision, and, upon returning, they announce that Strong's claims have been rejected. Strong then grabs a gun from a guard and kills Thornwell, believing him to be the one blocking further investigation and hoping to expose his alien nature by injuring him. However, Thornwell was privately arguing in support of Strong and was outvoted by other committee members that were the actual infiltrators. The death of Thornwell opens the way for a complete takeover of the committee's activities. Some of the infiltrators wonder if any of the other alien species will pose a threat to their plans, musing that "anything is possible".

=== Season 2 (1996) ===
No. overall	No. in season	Title	Directed by	Written by	Original release date
22	1	"A Stitch in Time"	Mario Azzopardi	Steven Barnes	January 14, 1996
FBI agent Jamie Pratt (Michelle Forbes) investigates a series of murders spanning a period of forty years that were all committed with the same gun. The gun is traced to Dr. Theresa Givens (Amanda Plummer), a former employee at a top-secret government project. Mysteriously, Givens was only five years old at the time of the first murder, and the gun had not even been manufactured yet. Jamie eventually learns that Givens has invented a time machine that she uses to travel back in time and assassinate men who would later in their lives commit acts of rape and murder towards women. In her final trip to the past, Givens brings Jamie along with her, and they arrive at the time and place Givens was abducted and assaulted. The man is killed before he can harm the young Givens, but Givens herself is fatally shot and dies. When Jamie returns to the future, she finds that the rape and murders Givens had prevented have all been undone – one such victim being Jamie's best friend. She visits the now adult young Givens, who has lived a happier life and asks her if she still invented the time machine. Jamie then travels back in time before her friend's death and shoots her murderer. Note: The character Dr. Theresa Givens also appears in the season 6 two-hour finale "Final Appeal".
23	2	"Resurrection"	Mario Azzopardi	Chris Brancato	January 14, 1996
Humanity has destroyed itself in a biological war, and only a few hundred androids remain. Two of the androids, Martin (Nick Mancuso) and Alicia (Heather Graham), have a plan to recreate the human race from DNA samples, but the ruling military androids are violently opposed to recreating their former masters. Dana Ashbrook plays the first human created from DNA samples.
24	3	"Unnatural Selection"	Joseph L. Scanlan	Eric A. Morris	January 19, 1996
Howard (Alan Ruck) and Joanne Sharp (Catherine Mary Stewart) are having a baby. They must decide whether to give their child all the advantages of black market genetic enhancements, which run the risk of genetic rejection syndrome (GRS). After discovering that their neighbor's son did not die years ago, but rather has been turned into a monster as a result of GRS, Howard and Joanne decide to reverse the genetic enhancement process of their unborn child. But are they too late?
25	4	"I Hear You Calling"	Mario Azzopardi	Based on the short story by : Katherine Weber; Teleplay by : Scott Shepherd	January 26, 1996
A reporter (Ally Sheedy) on her way to work overhears a cellular phone conversation about the "removal" of an author. Her investigation reveals a trail of people who disappeared, leaving only a pile of ash behind and the involvement of a man with violet eyes. After a series of chases and narrow escapes, the alien hitman finally catches up with the reporter and reveals to her that the people he has been "removing" had accidentally contracted a deadly alien virus, and that he has been hunting them down in order to prevent them from spreading the virus to the rest of humanity. The alien explains that the reporter has also contracted the virus through her contact with one of the targets, and the reporter ultimately decides to sacrifice herself to spare humanity from the disease. The alien corrects the reporter - he has not been vaporizing the targets, merely teleporting them off Earth, to a location where the disease is not fatal. The episode ends with the alien and the reporter teleporting away.
26	5	"Mind Over Matter"	Brad Turner	Jonathan Glassner	February 2, 1996
Dr. Sam Stein (Mark Hamill) develops a machine that allows a person to connect themselves directly to the brain of another and experience their thoughts and feelings. Intended for use with coma patients, he suddenly gets the chance to use it with a colleague who is comatose after an accident. Dr. Sam Stein initially thinks that his machine's application for communicating with the comatose Dr. Rachel Carter (Debrah Farentino) is a complete success. However, a mysterious pair of hands emerge to grab at Carter whenever Stein and Carter start becoming intimate. It is soon theorized that the pair of hands belongs to the machine itself; It has learned to love Stein and is jealous of Carter. Stein's only two options are to disconnect the machine or to "show" the machine that it cannot love. Stein attempts to show the machine that it cannot love by grabbing what he thinks is the virtual representation of the machine (a disheveled version of Dr. Carter) and smothering it with an equally virtual pillow (with goading from Carter). Once he does that, though, the physical body of Carter dies. At this point, the machine reveals that it has been masquerading as Carter all along after deciding that "love" is a positive emotion and that is in love with Dr. Stein -- the entity he had mistakenly suffocated was the real Carter. Stein, in a rage, destroys the machine.
27	6	"Beyond the Veil"	Allan Eastman	Chris Brancato	February 9, 1996
Eddie Wexler suffers from flashbacks of an alien abduction, which eventually drives him to suicidal behavior. After checking himself into a mental institution with others suffering from similar problems, he begins to suspect that there is something more sinister going on at the hospital.
28	7	"First Anniversary"	Brad Turner	Based on the short story by : Richard Matheson; Teleplay by : Jon Cooksey & Ali Marie Matheson	February 16, 1996
Norman Glass (Matt Frewer) celebrates his first wedding anniversary with his beautiful and talented wife, Ady (Michelle Johnson). Norman's best friend, Dennis (Clint Howard), also has a beautiful wife, Barbara (Jayne Heitmeyer). Over the next few days, both relationships unravel rather quickly. First, Dennis walks out on Barbara; Norman goes to talk to Dennis in a park and is frightened by what he finds. Dennis, clearly unhinged and paranoid, claims that Barbara is not what she seems; a strange woman approaches Dennis, begging him to talk to her. Norman does not recognize her, but Dennis does — whereupon he runs into traffic and is killed. After Dennis' funeral, Norman experiences the same effects: he begins to feel repulsed whenever he touches, smells, or tastes his lovely wife. Ady attempts to bluff her way out of the situation but is eventually forced to admit the truth: she and Barbara are aliens whose ship crash-landed on Earth some time ago. They are repulsive creatures in their natural form, but, since they were stranded, they decided to try to blend in and live out the rest of their lives as human women. The aliens can change appearance through influencing people's thoughts, but their ability to trick someone's senses wears off after a year or so. Norman becomes unhinged at this knowledge and is taken away by paramedics.
29	8	"Straight and Narrow"	Joseph L. Scanlan	Joel Metzger	February 23, 1996
A mother (Jane MacDougal) sends her recalcitrant son, Rusty Dobson (Ryan Phillippe), to a militaristic academy. The administrators are actually controlling the students through a chip inserted into their heads. They want to create a group of business executives who are willing to commit murder in order to make more money for their companies. Rusty and one other student are immune to the chip because of a medicine they are taking for ulcers. The other student wants to wait to graduate, and then expose the place to the outside world. Rusty is convinced that this is a bad idea and wants to escape. However, as soon as he approaches the boundary of the academy, the chip in his head causes debilitating pain. At the end of the episode, Rusty manages to escape by stealing the security clearance cards out of the administrator's office and disabling the boundary control system. His fellow students chase after him, but he re-activates the system and they are unable to follow him past the walls of the academy. He tries to call his mother from a payphone, but she is busy in an office. He heads to the site of an assassination plan he knows of, but the police officers (who show the distinctive scars from the computer chip implantation) detain him. His friend from school performs the assassination.
30	9	"Trial by Fire"	Jonathan Glassner	Brad Wright	March 1, 1996
President Charles Halsey (Robert Foxworth) and his wife Elizabeth (Diana Scarwid) are taken to an underground bunker on his inauguration night and he is told that an object is quickly approaching the Earth. This object turns out to be from an alien spaceship, and a fleet of alien spaceships is heading in towards Earth. The President is given as much information as possible but usually in scientific or technical language, and he demands that everything be told to him in plain English. The Russians are very afraid of the ships. As the alien fleet grows nearer to Earth, the aliens try using Earth's artificial satellites to communicate. The President asks one of his generals what to expect if the aliens were attacking the Earth, and the general tells him that the aliens would send a scout down to test the Earth's defenses. The aliens send one ship towards the Pacific Ocean, and it looks like they are attacking. Pressured by Russia, the President orders the Space Shuttle and a nuclear submarine to fire nuclear missiles at the ships, and the Russians also fire missiles. The aliens destroy the missiles, the Shuttle, the submarine, and send weapons bound for Moscow and Washington, DC. Computers manage to decode the message sent by the aliens by removing the interference of a liquid environment. The message revealed too late says: "Let us be your friends." Charles and Halsey embrace each other as the screen turns white.
31	10	"Worlds Apart"	Brad Turner	Chris Dickie	March 22, 1996
Early in his mission, UNAS astronaut Christopher Lindy (Chad Willett) crashes on an alien planet, but by some miracle he is able to contact Earth and speak directly to UNAS. His wife, Nancy McDonald (Bonnie Bedelia), is able to talk with him. She does not reveal that, while a relatively short period of time has passed for Lindy, 20 years have passed on Earth; Nancy is remarried and the director of the UNAS space agency. They are able to communicate due to the space-time distortion of the wormhole that Lindy's spacecraft passed through. A rescue mission is launched, but aborted due to the wormhole's changing properties and the danger to the rescuers. Lindy tells them to not attempt the rescue, and Nancy tells him the whole truth. Lindy plays a disk of Someone to Watch Over Me, the communication cutting out midsong. He is revealed to be on a planet with strange plants, waterfalls, and an abundance of wildlife.
32	11	"The Refuge"	Ken Girotti	Alan Brennert	April 5, 1996
Raymond Dalton (James Wilder) stumbles through a forest in a vicious blizzard before finally collapsing. He wakes in a warm and comfortable mansion with a group of people, only to be told that the entire world is blanketed by an enormous storm, and he has found the only safe place. As time passes, he discovers that the people and their roles keep changing, with one man appearing to be the cause.
33	12	"Inconstant Moon"	Joseph L. Scanlan	Based on the short story by : Larry Niven; Teleplay by : Brad Wright	April 12, 1996
Physics professor Dr. Stan Hurst (Michael Gross) notices that the Moon is extremely bright, and he realizes that the Sun must have gone nova with the daylight side of the Earth suffering extreme heat. Realizing that he only has a few hours left to live, he speaks to another academic and decides that it would be better if people did not know what had happened. For two years, he has had a secret crush on Leslie (Joanna Gleason), the owner of a local book shop, but he never had the courage to ask her out. In light of the pending disaster, he invites her to go for a walk with him. A whirlwind love story ensues where he and Leslie marry on what they assume is their last night on Earth. Hurst is forced to admit to Leslie what is going on, and she is initially extremely disconcerted and distrustful of his intentions, although he defers these misgivings by repeatedly professing his love. Later, he begins to suspect that the Earth is merely being hit by an extreme solar flare, and he begins to plan for an extended period of survival, despite his new wife's reluctance. He turns out to be correct and the professor and his wife are one of the few left alive despite extreme flooding, although the story is ambiguous as to the total scale of the disaster.
34	13	"From Within"	Neill Fearnley	Jonathan Glassner	April 28, 1996
A slightly underdeveloped boy named Howie (Neil Patrick Harris) is the last unaffected person in a small town overrun by a strange madness. Miners unearth ancient parasites, in the shape of worms, which attack the brains of their hosts. While the infected townsfolk lose all their inhibitions, Howie must save his sister Sheila (Christianne Hirt), the only person who truly cares for him. Deprived of Sheila's guidance for the first time in his life, Howie struggles to evade his maddened neighbors and destroy the parasites. In the process, the parasites are destroyed by sunlight he becomes a hero to the whole town.
35	14	"The Heist"	Brad Turner	Steven Barnes	May 5, 1996
Bitter ex-soldier Lee Taylor (Costas Mandylor) agrees to help a militia hijack a U.S. Army shipment of missiles. Instead of missiles, they find a lone guard who pleads with them not to open the shipment because it is deadly. Major Mackie (Colm Feore) demands to know what is in the shipment and believes that the Captain is lying. But all the lone guard will tell him is "Don't open it." Even under threat of death, Captain Washington (Jasmine Guy) refuses to stand down, but Mackie eventually forces his will to be done. They open the door and a chilling series of events begin to unfold as an alien life form freezes them to death. The militia members lose their discipline and begin to scatter, questioning their loyalties. All the while the alien stalks with cold impersonal efficiency, taking out the self-styled militia one by one, and duplicating itself. Washington and Taylor manage to destroy the creatures and escape the building. The final scene shows a police officer frozen outside of the building.
36	15	"Afterlife"	Mario Azzopardi	John F. Whelpley	May 19, 1996
Linden Stiles (Clancy Brown), a sergeant wrongly convicted for murdering eleven people, is offered a choice by Maculhaney (Alan Rachins) and Dr. Ellen Kersaw (Barbara Garrick) between his execution and cooperation with an experiment. His Christian beliefs do not allow him to make any choice but to go through with what turns out to be a genetic experiment to splice his genes with extraterrestrial DNA. Stiles gradually looks more and more nonhuman, with increased brain power and physical senses. He escapes in what turns out to be an intentional manhunt, so that his captors can hunt him down. When the end comes near for the now mutated Stiles, the tables turn when aliens resembling his new form appear. The aliens and Stiles beam away, leaving his pursuers to realize that they were the ones being tested by the aliens. Dr. Kersaw tells Maculhaney that they failed that test.
37	16	"The Deprogrammers"	Joseph L. Scanlan	James Crocker	May 26, 1996
In the near future, where a race of aliens called the Torkor have taken over Earth, Evan (Erich Anderson) is a slave in the mansion of the harsh-ruling Koltak (Vincent Hammond) who he refers to as "Milord". Like all other slaves ("Jollem"), he has been "programmed" to not feel anything, and to take everything his master says as fact without question. Later, Evan is captured by a resistance movement led by Professor Trent Davis (Brent Spiner), who call themselves the Vindicators, or the Deprogrammers. At first, he is completely vegetative towards them. Not even pain or having Trent cutting his wrist will make him flinch. But during the course of days, little by little, the resistance manages to wake up the parts of his mind that have been silenced by the programming. He is slowly introduced to his past life, a successful military career, and to his wife Jill (Nicole Oliver), who is also working with the resistance movement. The resistance aims to restore the meaning of what it means to be a human, by the means of military power. Finally, when Evan comes to realize that his master is actually responsible for killing all the children of the world, including his daughter, he becomes apparently sympathetic to the goals of the vindicators, despite occasional quirks in his thinking. Evan returns to Koltak's mansion, bringing with him a vial that is camouflaged as a vial of Seragon Oil, a substance Koltak is particularly fond of. He drops the vial into the bath the alien is taking, and combines it with another substance, making the bath become solid, trapping the alien there. Evan beats Koltak to death, and then returns to the place of the Vindicators, carrying the head of the alien with him in a bag. At the moment of joy and success, Trent Davis asks if "Milord" is pleased, after which another alien steps in, whom Evan recognizes as Megwon (Vincent Hammond). Davis had been a Jollem all along, but was spared from the reprogramming so that he can continue with his experiments. Megwon had used Evan as a pawn to kill his rival and take over his territory. Jill proceeds to berate Trent, saying that the rebels will go after him but Megwon states the resistance are little more than minor nuisances and that due to the power and might of the Torkor, any real resistance is impossible and will not be a threat to him. In the final scene, Evan is being reprogrammed again along with Jill....though Jill seems to resist programming.
38	17	"Paradise"	Mario Azzopardi	Jonathan Walker and Chris Dickie	June 16, 1996
Dr. Christina Markham (Mel Harris) and Sheriff Grady Markham (Geraint Wyn Davies) investigate a spate of strange incidents involving young and apparently healthy women suddenly extremely growing old and dying. The doctor's own mother may be involved in something from a shared past amongst all the women.
39	18	"The Light Brigade"	Michael Keusch	Brad Wright	June 23, 1996
In this sequel to "Quality of Mercy" (Season 1, Episode 13), the ship The Light Brigade is the last hope of humanity in a war against an alien race. In an attempt to turn the tide of the war, the Light Brigade carries a new bomb, which works by breaking down the forces which hold subatomic particles together, to be delivered to the enemy homeworld. As with the original atomic bomb, a very limited number were made, and the first was tested on one of the Martian moons. The explosion released such power that Earth experienced several nights as bright as daylight. The aliens ambush the ship and use their unique methods to try and trick the survivors of the ship into failing their mission through the use of John Skokes (Robert Patrick) - whose physical likeness has been assumed by an alien spy, leading one to believe the real Skokes died in captivity (following the events depicted in "Quality of Mercy"). In the closing scene, a young cadet (Wil Wheaton) releases the bomb over what he believes to be the alien homeworld. However, it is in fact Earth and the doomsday weapon is unleashed on an already crippled humanity.
40	19	"Falling Star"	Ken Girotti	Michael Bryant	June 30, 1996
Pop singer Melissa McCammon (Sheena Easton) is about to commit suicide by overdosing on drugs. With her once meteoric career at a standstill and her husband (Xander Berkeley) cheating on her, she sees no hope. She then encounters Rachel (Sarah Strange), an ardent fan from the future, who is a time traveler, and an uninvited guest in Melissa's body. She tells Melissa that her music inspired her future fans to resist a totalitarian takeover, which will succeed if she dies now. However, special authorities from the future are out to punish Rachel for her crime, as time-traveling and using a host body to change the past is a serious offense. The authorities want Melissa dead and will resort to anything, including murder, to preserve their version of the past.
41	20	"Out of Body"	Mario Azzopardi	James Crocker	July 14, 1996
Rebecca Warfield (Peri Gilpin) and her husband Ben McCormick (Victor Garber) are trying to find out if out-of-body experiences can be artificially induced by subjecting monkeys to electric impulses. They see it as pure science, but to religious groups like Family Foremost, it is sacrilege. Desperate for funding, Rebecca decides to run the experiment with a human subject: herself. She asks her assistant, Amy (Joely Fisher), to help. Amy, a secret religious fanatic, alters the experiment. Rebecca escapes from her body, but, unless she finds a way to communicate, she will remain trapped in another dimension.
42	21	"Vanishing Act"	Jonathan Glassner	Story by : Jonathan Walker; Teleplay by : Chris Dickie	July 21, 1996
An alien race that has no concept of time uses wormholes to find planets with living creatures so that they can enter them as hosts. When the host is asleep, they abduct them, transporting them to their home world where they can learn everything the host has experienced. However, since the aliens have no concept of the passage of time, they do not realize that each time they return home their host, Trevor (Jon Cryer), they are returning him a decade later each time, putting him further out of touch with everything he loves. After many decades of doing this to Trevor, they remove the connection and send him back to the night he first left. Trevor has his life back, and nobody knows what happened, except Trevor, who retains the memory of his experiences.
43	22	"The Sentence"	Joseph L. Scanlan	Melissa Rosenberg	August 4, 1996
Dr. Jack Henson (David Hyde Pierce) is conducting experiments in simulating time in prison, which he says will free up space, money and curtail what he feels are inhumane punishments. As a prisoner experiences twenty years in prison, only twenty minutes in reality has passed while he is attached to the machine that Henson has designed. A prisoner brought in for the experiment repeatedly claims to be innocent before being put into the simulation. When that prisoner begins to have seizures, Dr. Henson, worried that he may really be innocent and that the simulation is affecting him negatively, enters the simulation to bring the prisoner out within a 17-second time limit. Dr. Henson succeeds with time to spare. However, the prisoner dies from a heart attack due to the shock of the simulation. Henson is charged with the murder of the prisoner due to his perceived depraved indifference over his risky experiments, is found guilty, and is sentenced to twenty years in prison, where he is beaten up by his cellmate and tormented by hearing threats at night from what he believes is the brother of the prisoner who died. Attending sessions with the prison psychiatrist (a hologram), Henson is told the dead prisoner's brother is not in the prison, and he must be hallucinating. Henson unsuccessfully attempts to escape, and he eventually resigns himself to prison life, adjusting slowly until release. However, it turns out that he got the original prisoner free from the virtual prison in time and unharmed, but Henson felt so guilty at seeing what the prisoner was subjected to that he simulated his trial and sentence. A senator is very impressed with Henson's simulation and promises to push for its approval. Henson snaps at hearing this, attacking the senator and trying to destroy his machine, but he is restrained while he struggles despairingly.

=== Season 3 (1997) ===
No. overall	No. in season	Title	Directed by	Written by	Original release date
44	1	"Bits of Love"	Neill Fearnley	James Crocker	January 19, 1997
After a nuclear holocaust, Aiden Hunter (Jon Tenney) is possibly the last human alive. Despite this, for the last seven months, he has lived a hedonistic life deep below ground in a comfortable, hi-tech bunker, with only computer-generated holograms of his friends and family for company. He even has a machine capable of creating physical stimulation for more intimate encounters with simulated women. The controlling artificial intelligence personality of the computer system is Emma (Natasha Henstridge), who appears as an attractive female model. Eventually, Aiden tires of creating ideal women and decides to seduce Emma. Afterward, he treats her like the many other disposable, simulated females he has created. However, it seems Emma is more than a simple computer program, and she begins to make life difficult for him. She alters her appearance to seem pregnant and begins to control the other holograms to create her own world. When Aiden attempts to reset the system, Emma retaliates by creating a holographic Aiden, along with his family and friends. Aiden finds himself completely alone and, in effect, a "ghost" unable to interact with the new "real world".
45	2	"Second Thoughts"	Mario Azzopardi	Sam Egan	January 19, 1997
Karl Durand (Howie Mandel) is a man in his 30s, but with the mind of a child. Dr. Jacob Valerian discovers a method for transferring memories and experiences into another person's brain. As his last dying act, he transfers his own memories into Karl's brain. Karl begins to have flashes of skill and talent from absorbing the doctor's memories. When he accidentally kills another man, he uses the device to transfer the man's memories into his own brain. However, this causes Karl to exhibit multiple personality and schizoid behavior. Meanwhile, he tries to date a woman he has secretly loved for years (Jennifer Rubin), with no success, and is forced to kill and "absorb" the detective investigating the death of the man Karl accidentally killed. Finally, he absorbs the mind of an artist that the woman had a fling with hoping that his personality helps him to finally get her to love him. The artist was temperamental and suicidal. The ending sequence shows Karl kneeling on the floor going crazy with a gun pointed to his head. The final scene shows a photo of Rose with Karl apparently committing suicide off-camera.
46	3	"Re-generation"	Brenton Spencer	Tom J. Astle	January 24, 1997
The position of a high-profile and powerful public figure named Graham (Daniel Benzali) allows him to offer the opportunity to clone their deceased son. Rebecca (Kim Cattrall) is at first horrified and repulsed, but eventually agrees to undergo the procedure. After six months, strange things happen. Rebecca begins seeing things from her son's eyes. She meets with Dr. Cole (Teryl Rothery) and tells her of the episodes. They both conclude that the child she is carrying is not just a clone, but has the memories of her dead son, Justin. She also realizes that her baby reacts strangely whenever she is around her husband Graham. As she sees through the baby's eyes, she can see the moment of Justin's death, and it does not line up with what she had been told. Although Justin did die in an accident, Rebecca's husband, busy with some project, lost patience when the boy wanted attention, and brutally pulled a toy from Justin's hands, accidentally knocking him down; the boy fell and struck his head and died in the hospital later. She decides to leave, since her husband lied, but Graham tries to convince her to give him a second chance. Images communicated from Justin make her fear that Graham will attempt to kill her and make it look like an accident rather than allow her to leave him knowing his secret (a high-profile divorce, especially if she reveals the truth about what happened to their son, could ruin him), so she hides in the attic. She finds a shotgun up there, and when Graham approaches her, she shoots him (it is left ambiguous as to whether he truly intended to harm her). After three months, Rebecca has brought her newborn son in for a checkup (There is no explanation as to what occurred after Graham's death or what legal ramifications, if any, Rebecca faced for killing her husband). When she leaves on the elevator, we see Dr. Cole, now pregnant, and – responding to a kick – she calms the unborn child, calling his name: Graham.
47	4	"Last Supper"	Helen Shaver	Scott Shepherd	January 31, 1997
Danny Martin (Fred Savage), the son of Frank Martin (Peter Onorati), brings home a beautiful girl to meet his family. The girl, Jade (Sandrine Holt), looks exactly like a girl Frank once rescued from a top-secret military experiment 20 years before.
48	5	"Stream of Consciousness"	Joe Nimziki	David Shore	February 7, 1997
Due to a brain injury, Ryan Unger (George Newbern) cannot enjoy the benefits of a neural implant that allows other people to tap into The Stream, which is a direct connection into all human knowledge. He tries, unsuccessfully, to keep up with everyone else by using a long-forgotten skill: reading books. For the human race, the Stream has been erroneously programmed to crave information instead of knowledge. Soon, it begins to turn the human race into its slaves in an attempt to locate and process every single bit of information, a process that will lead to the human race's extinction as people stop doing everything to obtain the desired information. Ryan's injury keeps him from falling under the sway of the Stream, leaving him the only person who can stop it. The Stream will not allow itself to be shut down, and it commands the humans under its control to defend itself from Ryan. In the end, Ryan succeeds in shutting down the Stream and saving humankind. Cut off from the mental crutch humanity has used for so long, Ryan finds himself needing to teach humankind the old ways of acquiring information again — from books.
49	6	"Dark Rain"	Mario Azzopardi	David Braff	February 14, 1997
A chemical war leaves most of humanity unable to reproduce. Only rare couples, such as Sherry and Tim McAllister (Rachael Crawford and Don Franklin), are able to have healthy normal children. Sherry and Tim conceive and become the focus of intense attention from the government. The couple slowly comes to the realization of how important the pregnancy is to the government, and how far it will go to get what it wants. They find themselves in a secret maternity hospital overseen by Dr. Clayton Royce (Alamn Scarfe). The McAllisters are truly horrified when they find that Dr. Royce has hidden designs on their newborn son as he intends him to be a permanent ward of the state.
50	7	"The Camp"	Jonathan Glassner	Brad Wright	February 21, 1997
For the last twelve generations, humankind has been enslaved by an alien race and imprisoned in concentration camps. One woman, Prisoner 98843 (Harley Jane Kozak), dares to challenge the authority of the Commandant (David Hemblen). Her desire to be free is pitted against the seemingly invincible alien New Masters. All the prisoners believe the world outside the camp is uninhabitable by humans. Prisoner 98843 discovers that the Commandant and guards are androids who have received no maintenance for decades and are in desperate need of repair. She mends them from spare parts gleaned from other guards that have ceased to function, and she finally forces the Commandant to reveal that the rocket fuel made in the camp is no longer in use by the alien's fleet, which has moved beyond Earth. He has received no communication from his superiors for decades and has maintained the camp regimen simply because those were his orders. She leads a revolt that overpowers the guards and beheads the commandant. The episode ends with the inmates looking through the open gates at a virgin Earth.
51	8	"Heart's Desire"	Mario Azzopardi	Alan Brennert	February 28, 1997
A visitor from another world takes over the body of a human preacher (David Longworth) in the town of Heart's Desire in the Oregon Territory in 1872. He gives four outlaws a special energy power which they can use to destroy anything they wish, as long as they "want it more than anything else." The first to be empowered are two friends, Frank and JD Kelton (Esai Morales and Jed Rees); after they use the power to rob their ex-partners Jake and Ben Miller (Casper Van Dien and Gary Basaraba), the preacher gives the power to them as well. In the end, Jake is the only survivor of the four, having renounced the power; he confronts the "preacher" and demands an explanation. The visitor reveals his alien nature and explains that he is scouting ahead to see if humans will ever be able to rival his civilization. After seeing what humans are capable of - brother turning against brother, friend against friend - the scout is confident that his people have nothing to fear from humanity, who will surely destroy themselves before they can build an interstellar empire of their own. The scout then takes his leave.
52	9	"Tempests"	Mario Azzopardi	Hart Hanson	March 7, 1997
A spaceship crashes on a moon while on a mission of mercy. One of the crew is bitten by a strange spider-like creature and begins to hallucinate — unable to tell what is real and what is fantasy. Commander John Virgil (Eric McCormack) finds himself between two realities. He finds himself shifting from the "bad" reality, where he is stuck on the moon trying to survive with his crewmates and apparently hallucinating from poison, and the "good" reality, where he is with his family, heralded as a hero and hallucinating due to a virus called Ellycia C. In the end, Virgil makes a choice to save his people in the "bad" reality while saying goodbye to the "good" reality. The ship's captain (Burt Young) manages to fire him away from the spaceship in an escape pod. As he flies through space, he manages to get a transmission from his wife. As he claims "I saved them", reality shifts again, and the truth of everything is that Virgil has, in fact, been taken over by the spiders, as have the rest of the crew.
53	10	"The Awakening"	George Bloomfield	James Crocker	March 14, 1997
Beth (Lela Rochon), a woman with alexithymia is a guinea pig for a chip that could restore emotion to alexithymia sufferers. After the chip has been implanted in her bain, Beth experiences emotions for the first time. She then begins to hear voices and even sees aliens, who kidnap and perform experiments on her. The doctors suspect that this is a result of the implant and want to remove it. Before the chip can be removed, Beth escapes from the hospital and returns to the house where she has been staying. She discovers that the apartment above hers contains the props and lighting necessary for staging the alien kidnapping. Her supposed friends in the apartment building enter the room looking for their cat, Beth hides and, trusting they are alone, her friends discuss their plan to make Beth believe she is hallucinating in order to discredit the company funding the research into the brain implant, giving a rival company an advantage. Beth springs out of her hiding place and pushes a trolley bed towards them, pushing them out a window and killing both of them. Given her psychiatric problems, Beth is not held responsible for her actions by the courts. She then appears to have returned to her original, unemotional state, and it is assumed that the chip has burnt out. Days later, Beth is seen at home stroking her cat as she slowly develops a wry smile, suggesting that she was just hiding her emotions to avoid having the brain implant removed.
54	11	"New Lease"	Jason Priestley	Sam Egan	March 21, 1997
Doctors James Houghton (Stephen Lang) and Charles McCamber (Michael Ontkean), working in secret, develop a means of revitalising the dead. After a semi-successful test (a patient is revived but immediately begins a painful deterioration), Houghton is assaulted and killed in a robbery attempt. He is revived, believing that he has only a few days to live. Fearing that he has neglected his wife, he tries at first to make up for it by showering her with attention and affection, but Houghton's resentment towards the man who murdered him (Jason Priestley) takes over. Certain that he will die soon, he takes revenge on the robber only to find out later that he will live. Houghton is arrested later that day on murder charges and is likely to spend the rest of his life in prison.
55	12	"Double Helix"	Mario Azzopardi	Jonathan Glassner	March 28, 1997
A geneticist, Dr Martin Nodel (Ron Rifkin), is a researcher looking into introns, which are mysterious sections of DNA that he believes hold the secret to future evolution. Nodel develops a formula that he believes will activate the introns, and tests it on himself. Soon, he begins experiencinig strange symptoms, including a sort of map that grows on his back and a pattern that grows on his right hand. Shortly after Nodel's metamorphosis begins, he starts screening students for suitable candidates, ostensibly for an advanced seminar at the university where he performs his research and teaches. The candidates must have a high IQ, never had surgery, and are free from imperfections such as tattoos or glasses. They also must be a certain age, weight, and height range. After finding the qualified candidates, Nodel reveals to the group a map that has appeared on his back. The map leads them to an area in which is an unopenable door inside a cave. Suddenly, armed soldiers capture the entire group, which now includes Nodel's son (Ryan Reynolds) and his girlfriend, because the area is actually a hidden military installation. Inside the mysterious door is a spaceship with symbols on its outside that match the ones that have appeared on Nodel's hand. Nodel places his hand on the matching symbol and activates the ship. Through Nodel,a message from an alien race is transmitted to the students and the gathered military operatives. Nodel, the curated students, Nodel's son and his girlfriend board the ship, which then takes off. Note: The story concludes in episode 23 of season 4, "The Origin of Species".
56	13	"Dead Man's Switch"	Jeff Woolnough	Ben Richardson	April 4, 1997
Lieutenant Ben Conklin (James LeGros) is isolated for a year in a bunker underneath Alaska as one of five soldiers in similar bunkers around the world, including one person from United States of America, Russia, China, South Africa and Australia. His job is to be a revenge weapon should a fleet of approaching alien space ships turn out to be hostile. The world's chemical, nuclear and biological weapons stockpiles have been linked to create a single doomsday weapon. One of the group must push a randomly activated dead man's switch to prevent the weapons from detonating. Eventually, Conklin is the only bunker left, until he receives a message from his superior (Donnelly Rhodes) telling him that the aliens have been defeated and that he must keep pressing the button until they can dig him out. The scene then shifts and shows that the planet's surface has been devastated, and the General was under the control of alien parasites while talking to Conklin.
57	14	"Music of the Spheres"	David Warry-Smith	Steven Barnes	May 9, 1997
Devon Taylor (Joshua Jackson), a young physics student, picks up a signal during his work at a radio observatory, believing that he can hear a pattern in it that none of his older colleagues can hear. Taylor's younger sister, Joyce Taylor (Kirsten Dunst), plays the tape and enjoys the sound so much she plays it at a rave. When Devon finds her at the rave, everyone there is infected with skin deformities. All the teens are quarantined at a hospital, but, when they are separated from the music, they all experience severe pain and withdrawal symptoms. With the help of his father (Howard Hesseman), Devon and his superiors are left with no choice but to let the patients listen to the tape until they can figure out the rest of the transmitted message. Later, it is discovered that a dying alien world had transmitted this audio in order to save other planets from a dire fate: their sun had shifted to the ultraviolet spectrum, and all their world's inhabitants would have died if they had not figured out how to alter their own physiology so that they could resist the effects of their changed sun. The aliens had detected that Earth's Sun would also undergo the same change and sent the audio signal so that humanity could prepare. In the end, humanity either transforms by the transmitted sound (developing new, hardened skin) or chooses to remain as they were, having to avoid the Sun at all times since the new sun's radiation would be fatal to them.
58	15	"The Revelations of 'Becka Paulson"	Steven Weber	Based on the short story by : Stephen King; Teleplay by : Brad Wright	June 6, 1997
Becka Paulson (Catherine O'Hara) accidentally shoots herself in the head while watching a soap opera. The bullet lodges in her brain and begins to have some strange effects. In a stroke of 'luck', the bullet does not kill Becka, but her severe brain damage causes her to begin to hallucinate that the picture of a tuxedoed stranger on top of the TV (Steven Weber; who calls himself 'The 8 By 10' Man; in the original story it was a picture of Jesus) is talking to her. Under the advice of the 8 By 10 Man, Becka eventually decides to take revenge on her cheating husband Joe (John Diehl), and, in a bit of 'damaged savantry', rigs up the television (under the 8 by 10 Man's instructions) to deliver a fatal electrical pulse to whoever touches the knob. Becka, in the end, tricks Joe into touching it, but, as he begins to be fatally electrocuted, she finally realizes just what she has done and tries to save him. All she does is alter the circuit by touching him, and the two fall dead, the victim of a tragic quirk of fate that was, in the end, far from lucky. Note: The episode is based on the short story "The Revelations of 'Becka Paulson" by Stephen King, first published in 1984. The character Becka Paulson is also in the Stephen King novel The Tommyknockers (1987).
59	16	"Bodies of Evidence"	Melvin Van Peebles	Story by : Chris Dickie and Ryland Kelley; Teleplay by : Chris Dickie	June 20, 1997
The crew of the space station UNAS Meridian, led by Captain William Clark (Mario Van Peebles), begins to see visions of loved ones or enemies that lure them to their deaths. After three of the crew die, the remaining two (including Clark) escape to Earth, where Clark is accused of murdering his crew. Robin Dysart (Jennifer Beals), his ex-wife, defends him by suggesting that the crew was driven insane by an experimental chemical, soroxin. Could there be a more sinister cause for the deaths though?
60	17	"Feasibility Study"	Ken Girotti	Joseph Stefano	July 11, 1997
Joshua Hayward (David McCallum) and his daughter Sarah (Laura Harris) awake one morning to find a four-block section of their suburban neighborhood surrounded by a mysterious energy barrier. Sarah finds a badly disfigured alien, Adrielo (Zachary Ansley), who tells her that her neighborhood has been grabbed and moved by another race of aliens, the Triunes. He shows her a way through the energy barrier to his own captured realm and begs her to help him save his people. Meanwhile, Joshua finds a way through the barrier and comes face-to-face with their captors, a slothful race who feel physical activity is beneath them. The Triunes explain that all of the inhabitants of Joshua's neighborhood have been taken as part of a feasibility study into the suitability of humans for slavery, and, if they are found able to survive in the alien's native environment, the rest of Earth's population will also be enslaved. Adrielo's people are dying from a disease that is turning them to stone, and Sarah accidentally becomes infected. Joshua eventually finds her, and she pleads with him not to touch her, so he may not become infected. They return to their own neighborhood, and Joshua explains the purpose of the energy barrier to the other residents, wondering what choice they have other than to serve as slaves. Joshua explains the disease his daughter has been infected with, and suggests they deliberately infect themselves to save Earth from enslavement. After discussing it, all join hands in the church to sacrifice themselves and prove that humans are unsuitable as slaves. Note: A remake of the 1964 episode "A Feasibility Study", from the original series.
61	18	"A Special Edition"	Mario Azzopardi	Story by : Naren Shankar and Jonathan Glassner; Teleplay by : Naren Shankar; Excerpts by : Scott Shepard, Sam Egan, Brad Wright, Naren Shankar, Chris Brancato, John Whelpley and David Braff	July 25, 1997
Donald Rivers (Alan Thicke), a journalist for the television show The Whole Truth, has found proof that the government and large defense contractors have been illegally and secretly cloning human beings. After locking himself in the studio with only a small crew, he plans to air his report, which is made up of clips from other episodes of The Outer Limits, to the world. His only guest is Dr. Randall Strong's brother Dr. Avery Strong (Bruce Harwood) as outside forces plan to thwart the broadcast. Note: One clip was taken from an episode that had yet to be broadcast, "In Another Life", which aired several months later as part of the next season.

=== Season 4 (1998) ===
No. overall	No. in season	Title	Directed by	Written by	Original release date
62	1	"Criminal Nature"	Steve Anker	Based on a concept by : Eric A. Morris; Teleplay by : Brad Markowitz	January 23, 1998
The genetic rejection syndrome (GRS) monster children are now adults who commit murders. Detective Ray Venable (Gary Cole) has a "secret" son with GRS, Dylan (Jason Gray-Stanford), who is harassing Ray's family. Ray injects himself with a serum to temporarily enhance his sensory abilities (more like GRS people) in order to hunt him. Ray does this successfully only to find out that it was a plot by his son, who placed the serum so that Ray would find it. Ray's son forcefully injects more of the serum into his dad, so that Ray now has irreversible GRS and Ray transforms into a monster. Ray kills Dylan, but Ray's family is afraid of him because he now looks like the other GRS monsters. Note: This episode is a sequel to the episode Unnatural Selection (Season 2, Episode 3).
63	2	"The Hunt"	Mario Azzopardi	Sam Egan	January 30, 1998
A group of obsolete androids consit of a doctor, a miner named Kel (Doug Savant) and two others attempt to escape from Hunter George Nichols (Ron White), his sons Eric and Clute (Tobias Mehler and Bob Gunton) and their guide Pete during the beginning of a hunt. They find a way to remove their inhibitors (chips that keep them from confronting and/or attacking the humans), allowing them to set traps instead of merely running away. One of their traps kills Clute. However, none but Kel survives to reach the end of the hunting area, where a game warden (Russell Ferrier) tells him that Kel is free, since he survived the hunt. In the next scene, another group of androids are unloaded for another hunt where Kel has been reprogrammed to be their guide.
64	3	"Hearts and Minds"	Brad Turner	Naren Shankar	February 6, 1998
All soldiers (Christine Elise, Miguel Fernandes, Dylan Walsh, and Vincent Gale) of a military strike team have drug injectors to protect them against an "alien virus". After a drug injector malfunction, the soldiers slowly realize that the drug is actually designed to cause hallucinations of disgusting looking aliens. The "aliens" are actually humans as well, but from another federation. The team tries to make contact with the "alien team" to explain the situation and ask for peace, but their drug injectors work properly and they kill everyone from the team, believing that they are the aliens. The final scene shows the soldiers dead on the floor.
65	4	"In Another Life"	Allan Eastman	Story by : Naren Shankar, Brad Wright and Chris Brancato; Teleplay by : Naren Shankar	February 16, 1998
Mason Stark (Mitchell Laurance) hates his life. A year ago, he lost his wife Kristin (Kelly Rowan) to a mugger's bullet and he still blames himself for not doing more to protect her. And today, he was fired from his job. With a gun in his hand and a severance package on his desk, Mason finds himself torn between suicide and psychosis—between killing himself and killing his co-workers. But before he can do either he is pulled into another dimension, into a world where there are hundreds of Mason Starks, each with a different life and a different character. The version of himself that brought Mason here is a powerful, manipulative man—we know him as Stark—who, in this dimension, runs the same company that fired Mason. Stark explains that he built a machine, the Quantum Mirror, to explore all those different versions of himself, only to have his experiment go horribly wrong because he pulled a murderous version of himself, a man we know as Mace (Matthew Laurance), into his reality. Now Stark wants Mason to stop the killer and promises to reunite him with Kristin as his reward. In this looking glass world, Mason must hunt himself on behalf of himself, in a desperate race to stop a killer ... and change his own life for the better.
66	5	"In the Zone"	David Warry-Smith	Story by : Jon Povill; Teleplay by : Naren Shankar	February 20, 1998
With its deadly lasers and hand-to-hand battles, "The Octal" is a combat sport for a new generation of athletes, but Tanner Brooks (Adrian Pasdar) is no longer a young man. Although he has promised his wife Jessica (Claudette Mink) that this will be his final tournament, Tanner is desperate to go out a winner. Dr. Michael Chen (Pat Morita) has a way to make that happen. Through an experimental treatment that taps the power of the human nervous system, Chen accelerates Tanner's reflexes and perceptions. To Tanner, everything in the Octal begins to move in slow motion... and Tanner quickly becomes unbeatable. However, there are side effects: Jessica notices that Tanner is tired, haggard and his hair is going gray. But, when Tanner's body begins to blur and fade out of existence, Tanner and Jessica must choose between one last moment of glory... their love for each other... and oblivion even when Jessica takes the same treatment. After Dr. Chen disappears upon immersing his hands into the tank filled with the treatment, Tanner and Jessica are restored to normal. They find Dr. Chen's driver's license where they note that he should've been 30 years old and that he tested the procedure on himself.
67	6	"Relativity Theory"	Ken Girotti	Carleton Eastlake	February 27, 1998
Biologist Teresa Janovitch (Melissa Gilbert) is a civilian among military men, traveling on the Resource Survey Vehicle Cortez to Tau Ceti Prime in search of minerals for an Earth that has exhausted its own. Initial surveys indicate the planet is both uninhabited and rich in mineral resources, which could mean million-dollar paydays for both the crew and the company that owns the Cortez. During the first exploration of the planet, the crew is attacked by gigantic and apparently primitive aliens. After the command falls to Janovitch, she is removed from command by her crew—Sgt. Adam Sears, a veteran of pacification missions on Earth, who favors annihilation of the new race. Sears leads a patrol that hunts down and kills the aliens, in the process seizing a golden object that resembles a religious totem. As he celebrates his slaughter, Janovitch examines his victims and makes a shocking discovery. The "primitive" aliens are actually children, an alien version of Boy Scouts from an advanced species whose guardian appears through a wormhole much to the surprise of the humans. Having downloaded the location of the homeworld for these bloodthirsty aliens that would murder children, the guardian detonates a bomb that kills the remaining crew. The episode ends with an alien ship approaching Earth ready to attack.
68	7	"Josh"	Jorge Montesi	Chris Ruppenthal	March 6, 1998
Tabloid TV reporter Judy Warren (Kate Vernon) knows she has come across a big story when she sees the videotape shot by two tourists in a remote Alaskan park. The tape shows Josh Butler (Alex McArthur), a recluse who lives in a cabin near the park, bringing back to life a young girl who has died after a fall, a feat he accomplishes by generating a mysterious blue glow. But, she only discovers how big a story it is when her pursuit of the strange young man is cut short by a top-secret military unit that is also chasing him. It seems that the blue glow sent out electromagnetic pulses that knocked out two satellites orbiting 20,000 miles above the Earth, and the Air Force wants to know what's going on. A battery of tests does not produce any answers, leaving the brass, led by General Roger Tennent (Scott Hylands) and Colonel Samuel Harbeck (Larry Musser) to debate whether Butler is an alien or an angel—someone to be dissected or to be worshipped. Warren does not know what Josh is either, but she knows she does not trust the soldiers to make the right choice. This prompts her to try to save the recluse. As Josh ascends back to his home, Judy destroys the information.
69	8	"Rite of Passage"	Jimmy Kaufman	Chris Dickie	March 13, 1998
The birth of a child is a joyful event, but, for Shal and Brav (Emmanuelle Vaugier and James Marsden), two young naive humans who live in a small commune in the woods, it is also a mystery and moment tinged with sadness. After Shal gives birth to a son, the first of the commune to do so, she and the baby are taken away by Mother (Camille Mitchell), a wise alien who acts as a parent to the young people. When the aliens send Shal home without her baby, she asks Brav to help her to rescue the child. With the knowledge Shal has gained from her time with Mother, they break through the protective barrier set up by the aliens to discover a new and fascinating world. It is a dangerous trip, with stinging, snake-like crawlers lurking in the shadows. However, it is also a journey of discovery, as Shal and Brav find evidence (skeletons and body parts) that leads them to believe that their real parents were killed by the aliens. They find their baby and, after a fight with an alien, escape into the forest. They must grapple with some haunting questions though. Is Mother a monster or a savior? Also, did the aliens destroy humankind or rescue it?
70	9	"Glyphic"	Catherine O'Hara	Naren Shankar	March 20, 1998
When Tom Young (Peter Flemming) from the Department of Health travels to a small town in the Pacific Northwest to examine an old case file, it appears as though long ago the town had stopped trying to live in the present. Twelve years have passed since a tragedy killed most of their young children and left the residents without hope, without a future. Many of them are still angry with the medical community for not finding a cure to save the children. The town's physician Dr. Malcolm Boussard (Lane Smith) has felt the brunt of their anger, especially since his own two children did not die during the epidemic. Although they were spared, his son Louis (Brad Swaile) still lies in a coma while his daughter Cassie (Rachael Leigh Cook) has learning disabilities and expresses herself through abstract sculpture and artwork. Through hypnosis, Tom begins to probe Cassie's mind and unravels a memory of 'alien' proportions.
71	10	"Identity Crisis"	Brad Turner	James Crocker	March 27, 1998
Captain Cotter McCoy (Lou Diamond Phillips) is the first of a new breed of soldier. As part of a top-secret program overseen by Dr. Greg Olander (Robert Joy), General Langston Chase (Dale Wilson), and Cotter's friend Colonel Pete Butler (Scott Kraft), the contents of McCoy's brain can be temporarily transferred into an android version of himself. This process creates a virtually indestructible fighting machine with the smarts and experience of a human being. But, one day something goes wrong. During the transfer, the real McCoy's body is blasted with electricity, stopping his heart, inflicting serious brain damage and leaving Cotter's mind trapped in the android body. To make matters worse, the interface between his mind and the android body is flawed. McCoy's motor control is already beginning to break down and the interface will likely collapse within 12 hours. The General is prepared to sacrifice McCoy to keep the program secret, but McCoy uses his enormous strength to break out and visit his wife Holly (Teri Polo). Together, they track down Olander and begin a desperate search for what went wrong. As all the signs begin to point to sabotage, McCoy asks himself who would do such a thing? And, more important, how can it be undone?
72	11	"The Vaccine"	Neill Fearnley	Based on a concept by : Victoria James; Teleplay by : Brad Wright	April 3, 1998
A genetically engineered virus, developed and released by a doomsday cult, has wiped out almost all human life on Earth. Twelve hospital patients, accompanied by the one remaining staff member - nurse Marie Alexander (María Conchita Alonso), are living on borrowed time in the hospital, with food and generator fuel running dangerously low. A soldier arrives with a newly developed vaccine, but Marie learns that there is only enough for three people and that the vaccine requires three days to fully develop before it can be injected into any humans. Marie reveals to the entire group that there is a vaccine, but keeps the amount secret between her and to her closest companion in the group, a terminally ill cancer patient named Bernard Katz (Jay Brazeau). When two members of the group discover the truth, they arm themselves with the only gun and force Marie to administer the vaccine to them, which she agrees to only if the third recipient is a child named Harry. While she is preparing the vaccine, she turns her back only to see the third dose of vaccine being administered to one of the others, dooming young Harry. Immediately, the three die of anaphylactic shock, leading Marie to conclude that the group survived not due to the hospital's sterile atmosphere but because they were immune. After three months of confinement, the group emerges from the hospital to face the new world.
73	12	"Fear Itself"	James Head	Sam Egan	April 10, 1998
For as long as he can remember, Bernard Selden (Arye Gross) has been haunted by a paralyzing fear. It started when he was six years-old, when he set a fire that killed his four-year-old sister, and today, at age 27, the fear clings to him like a blanket. Dr. Adam Pike (Jeffrey DeMunn) has hope for a cure and has diagnosed Bernard's condition, believing that, if he can isolate the part of the brain responsible for fear (the amygdala), he can cure him. A series of injections and radiation designed to build a layer of calcium around the amygdala produces stunning results as Bernard's fear recedes. He even starts a relationship with his neighbor Lisa (Tanya Allen). However, there are side effects as Bernard can now use his brain to make others feel the kind of crippling fear that he used to feel. Bernard is also still a prisoner of the past, haunted by images of Mr. Wilkes (Alex Diakun), the owner of the foster home where Bernard's sister died. At a terrible risk, Bernard feels that he must go back to the day when the fear began and discover the truth.
74	13	"The Joining"	Brad Turner	Story by : Sam Egan, Jonathan Glassner and Brad Wright; Teleplay by : Sam Egan	April 17, 1998
When a USAS transport ship crashes and wipes out most of an outpost on Venus, Capt. Miles Davidow (C. Thomas Howell) is the sole survivor. After he is rescued by a team that includes his fiancée Kate Girard (Amanda Tapping) and Dr. Scott Perkins (Jeffrey Jones), it soon becomes clear that Davidow did not escape unscathed. Removed from the atmosphere of Venus, his body reacts to the Earth's environment like a chemotherapy patient. When Dr. Perkins gives him the radiation his body seems to crave, strange things start to happen. Davidow's body begins to spawn duplicate parts: a hand, a torso and more from wounds that miraculously heal. In spite of this, Miles and Kate get married while he is still in isolation, but his time on Venus and the strange creatures he encountered there have had a profound change on Miles. As the mysterious changes continue, it becomes clear that although Davidow did what it took to survive, the price of survival may be exile from everything he knows and loves.
75	14	"To Tell the Truth"	Neill Fearnley	Lawrence Meyers	April 24, 1998
Dr. Larry Chambers (Gregory Harrison) helped build the colony on Janus Five. He and fellow scientist Amanda Harper (Kim Huffman) run computer simulations that show the planet's star will flash over in a matter of days, emitting waves of deadly radiation, so Dr. Chambers urges evacuation. This is not a popular recommendation, especially among the colony's leaders who include council chairman Franklin Murdock (William Atherton), security head Montgomery Bennett (Alan Scarfe), and Amanda's father Ian Harper (Ken Pogue). They point out that Chambers has been wrong before; the colony had to be moved at great cost after he warned of deadly volcanic activity that never occurred; and they suggest that his judgment has been clouded by the death of his wife Elise. When that does not stop Chambers, Murdock and Bennett discredit him by falsely accusing him of being one of the aliens who originally inhabited the planet, suggesting that the evacuation plan is a plot to reclaim the planet for his people. Imprisoned and threatened with death, Chambers's only hope is that Amanda will uncover the truth in time to save him and the colony.
76	15	"Mary 25"	James Head	Jonathan Glassner	May 29, 1998
In a follow-up to "Valerie 23", the Innobotics Corporation develops Mary 25 (Sofia Shinas) as a robot nanny. She is designed not to allow anyone to harm the children, including the children themselves as promoted by Charlie Bouton (Tom Butler) at a board meeting with his boss Mrs. Janus (Paula Shaw). When the Bouton children (Britt McKillip and Matthew Prior) start fighting amongst themselves, Mary places them in separate rooms. Teryl (Cynthia Geary), the children's mother and the wife of Charlie, wants Mary out of the house, but Charlie says no since he has started using Mary as a sex toy. It becomes clear that Charlie has been abusing Teryl when the children ask Mary "Why does daddy hurt mommy?". Charlie's co-worker Dr. Melburn Ross (Michael Shanks) has feelings for Teryl and tries to protect her; he re-programs Mary so that she now considers that by hurting the mother, Charlie is hurting the children. When Charlie next beats Teryl, Mary breaks his neck. In the aftermath, the human nanny Carmen Ortega (Patricia Mayen Salazar) is re-hired and the spark is rekindled between Teryl and Melburn. In the episode's twist ending, Teryl's dark secret is discovered: the real Teryl that Melburn loved had been killed by Charlie and was replaced by Valerie 24, a successor to the defunct Valerie 23. She had used Mary to get rid of Charlie because she believed Melburn would love her. This leaves Melburn frightened.
77	16	"Final Exam"	Mario Azzopardi	Carleton Eastlake	June 5, 1998
Dr. James Martin (Brett Cullen), a negotiator for the Department of Energy Nuclear Response Team, is called in when a disgruntled grad student named Seth Todtman (Peter Stebbings), takes hostages at a university, where Todtman claims to have invented a cold-fusion bomb and is threatening to detonate it. Todtman wants the government to bring him five people and kill them. Martin's colleagues dismiss Todtman as a crank, until the sample device Todtman provides goes off with megaton force. Martin meets with Todtman face-to-face to face and tries to understand the logic behind his rage at the people he wants killed: cruel foster parents, corrupt professors and a heartless librarian. Martin tries to reason with Todtman while the military tries to find a way to disarm the device. The government assassinates Todtman and defuses the bomb, but Todman had warned Martin that, just like with the creation of the atom bomb, someone else will soon find a way to create another device. At the end of the episode, a disgruntled student at a different college is shown taking a test where one of the questions is: "Demonstrate why cold fusion is impossible." He quits the exam and leaves to carry on Todtman's work.
78	17	"Lithia"	Helen Shaver	Sam Egan	July 3, 1998
Lithia is set in 2055 in a world populated only by women. The men were killed years earlier in a war. The women are living in a commune and seem to be living full and happy lives, although they lack some of the technology of the past. One man, named Mercer (David Keith), remains in cryogenic stasis, and the episode begins as he is awakened; the Lithians preserved the last men in case of emergency but now wish to see whether they are missing out. Neighboring villages are in control of many of the resources, which makes Mercer jealous. He tries to tell the women living in the commune that they must make sure that they have enough resources for themselves. Their leader Hera (Julie Harris) tells him that kind of thinking is what led to war. Mercer's presence is a subject of sexual curiosity for one of the women, causing her female lover to become jealous. Mercer becomes aggressive and proceeds to steal electricity from a rival village. This leads to the deaths of several different women. It is revealed that the women were responsible for unfreezing eleven other men and attempting to integrate them into their society, but each attempt resulted in a similar tragedy. Mercer is then condemned to being refrozen as punishment. As a struggling Mercer begins to refreeze, he realizes that the leader of the women's village was his own lost love, who sadly bids him farewell while he returns to a living death.
79	18	"Monster"	Allan Eastman	Chris Ruppenthal	July 10, 1998
The four people gathered in the top-secret research facility seem at first to have nothing in common: Ford Maddox (Harry Hamlin) is a former spy, Rachel Sanders (Nicole De Boer) is a nurse, Roger Beckersly (Aaron Pearl) is an Army Ranger, and Louise McDonnaugh (Bridget O'Sullivan) is a computer programmer. What has brought them together is their telekinetic ability, a talent that Mr. Brown (Robert Guillaume), a CIA project head, hopes to exploit through the use of Teeks, devices that amplify telekinetic power. At first, Brown tries these individuals' talents out on simple tasks—moving or crushing a granite block with their minds—but soon his true intentions are revealed. Their first real assignment, says Brown, is to use their powers to kill a Balkan terrorist leader and war criminal. Rachel objects to the assignment on moral grounds, but Brown forces her to take part by threatening to send her brother, a junkie and small-time crook, to jail for life. With Rachel on board, the assassination is a success, as is the elimination of a pesky African revolutionary leader. But, the telekinetic powers produce unexpected side-effects and soon the killers find that they have become the prey. The final scene shows a bunch of people dead on the floor (just like in Rachel's dream).
80	19	"Sarcophagus"	Jeff Woolnough	Bill Froehlich	August 7, 1998
Natalie Granger (Lisa Zane) is a driven researcher, faithfully and dutifully supported by her husband (David Cubitt) - who is the first to touch the odd, amber-like cocoon mass found in an anachronistic burial chamber. The contact has two effects, beginning the reawakening of the dormant mass, and imprinting Curtis (David Cubitt) with the last memories of a long suspended alien who was attacked by primitive men. Each further contact speeds the alien's regeneration at the temporary expense of Curtis' energy. Emmet (Robert Picardo) is substantially more pragmatic and chooses the commercial rewards made possible by the longevity potential evidenced by the now reforming alien (Doug Jones). Convincing the remaining two members of the team, he stages a coup which is eventually thwarted by the alien and a panic-induced cave in. The severely wounded husband and wife, finally reconciled through their shared adversity, are trapped and in dire straits until the alien coats them in his preservative, allowing them to be revived and made physically whole roughly 1,000 years into a future world which their wisdom has allowed to become a cooperative human-alien world.
81	20	"Nightmare"	James Head	Story by : Sam Egan and Tracy Tormé; Teleplay by : Sam Egan; Based upon the original episode by : Joseph Stefano	August 14, 1998
During a war with the planet Ebon, a group of Earth soldiers consisting of Sgt. Waylon Dumar (Steven Bauer), Captain Roger Kimbro (Maurice Dean Wint), Kristin Anne O'Keefe (Kerry Sandomirsky), (Brandy Ledford), Lt. Christopher Valentine (Cameron Graham), and Major Ronald Naguchi (Robin Shou) are sent to deploy a top-secret device on an uninhabited planet near enemy territory. Captured there, the soldiers undergo physical and psychological torture by an unseen enemy. The prisoners become suspicious of each other when their captors claim they have received cooperation and physical wounds from torture are healed after interrogation. Eventually, Kristin Anne O'Keefe, one of the primary designers of the device, is forced to activate the device so the enemy can use it for themselves, but she sets the device to go off as they are confronted by their superior General Seawell (Garry Chalk). It is revealed that they were on Earth the whole time that they were being tested, and now that the device has been turned on which was supposed to be impossible. It cannot be turned off and they have doomed Earth as they are left trying to find a way to deactivate it at the last minute.
82	21	"Promised Land"	Neill Fearnley	Story by : Brad Markowitz and Brad Wright; Teleplay by : Brad Markowitz	August 21, 1998
Years ago, the Tsal-Khan race arrived on Earth to become friends with humans, but the distrusting nature of the Earthlings led to a bitter war of conquest. Dlavan (René Auberjonois) and his family are the offspring of the handful of aliens who remained on Earth after this conflict, and they live on a tightly guarded farm where they must grow all their own food, since their forebears poisoned all the plants during the war with humankind. The aliens believe that the human race was wiped out in the war, but there is a group of humans (some of the survivors of the episode "The Camp") in the woods near their farm. This group, led by Rebecca (Caroline Goodall), includes David (Joseph Kell), Ruth (Jane Sowerby) and a mute, orphaned child Tali (Jessica Harmon). The humans are hungry and have seen some of their numbers die from eating poisoned fruit. When they spot Dlavan's grandson Ma'al wandering in the woods, they follow him home to the alien's farm, where they see how well-fed the aliens are. Rebecca leads the group to raid the farm for food. At first, Tali figures out how to get around the farm's deadly defensive measures, but things escalate and individuals are hurt or killed on both sides. When Rebecca captures an alien weapon and Tali is seriously injured, the scene is set for the final showdown, a battle that could destroy both groups.
83	22	"The Balance of Nature"	Steve Johnson	Derek Lowe	September 4, 1998
Dr. Noah Phillips (Maurice Godin) is developing the "Cellular Regressor" - a machine designed to rejuvenate an individual's cells and restore youth upon its subject. While creating the machine, his wife Meredith (Lisa Maris), goes into a coma from cancer. Although the Regressor had not been properly tested yet, he attempts to restore Meredith's health by reversing the effects of age and cancer on her cells. Meredith awakens, completely oblivious to the treatment, and Noah embraces her. His celebration is short-lived as the cancer returns a few minutes later, killing her. Disgusted by his actions, Noah's superiors cut off his funding, terminating him from his job. Noah, devastated by the loss of Meredith, moves to a small town where he meets 65-year-old Barbara (Barbara Rush). Her abusive husband, Greg Matheson (Harve Presnell), views Noah with suspicion, thinking that he will move in on his wife, despite their 30 year age difference. Continuing to test the Regressor and inspired by Barbara's words that the world always maintains a "balance of nature", he discovers that he can restore an elderly frog's youth, only if he allows another frog to grow old in the process. Noah's love for Barbara deepens while Greg's jealousy drives him to beat Barbara within an inch of her life. Realizing that Barbara is about to die, Noah decides to use the Regressor to restore her youth and lose his in the process. She regresses back to a young woman (Fiona Loewi), but loses her memory, believing it to be 1957. The now elderly Noah convinces her what has happened when Greg bursts in wielding a gun, forcing Noah to transfer his remaining life force to him. However, Greg sits in the wrong seat of the machine, and the transfer restores Noah's youth, killing Greg. Noah awakens with no memory of Barbara, believing it to be just after the death of his wife. Barbara begins to explain what has happened to him, indicating that they will start anew.
84	23	"The Origin of Species"	Brad Turner	Story by : Jonathan Glassner and Naren Shankar; Teleplay by : Naren Shankar; Excerpts by : Jonathan Glassner	November 27, 1998
In this sequel to "Double Helix" (Season 3, Episode 12), Dr. Ira Nodel (Ron Rifkin) has his body altered to communicate with aliens who have seeded Earth with their genetic material. He is joined on an alien spaceship by his son Paul (Ryan Reynolds) and six students, including Paul's girlfriend Hope (Kathleen Duborg). When Dr. Nodel touches a glowing post in the ship's control room, both he and Paul are consumed by a mysterious light. This leads Hope and the students to believe that they've been led into a trap, a suspicion that is reinforced when the ship captures two of the students and pulls them through the wall. Desperate to find out what's going on, Hope reads Dr. Nodel's journal and risks her life by touching the glowing post. Her body begins the same transformation, and a strange glowing entity speaks in the voices of Dr. Nodel and Paul, trying to communicate with her. The ship, however, continues to snatch the students two by two, until finally they are all suspended, naked and unconscious in a black void. When they awaken sometime later, they find the ship has landed on a dead planet. Have the aliens, who promised that they were part of a great experiment in hope, led them astray?
85	24	"Phobos Rising"	Helen Shaver	Garth Gerald Wilson	December 4, 1998
Two separate political entities of both Earth and Mars, the Free Alliance and the Coalition, have been in a state of cold war for 30 years. Both are currently mining triradium, a radioactive material that could conceivably be used for weapons that could destroy an entire planet. Amidst fear on both sides, a giant explosion is seen to destroy Earth and sends shockwaves towards Mars, where a Coalition base and an Alliance base are currently situated. Colonel Samantha Elliot (Barbara Eve Harris) believes that the Coalition has been smuggling triradium and is responsible for the destruction of Earth. Major James Bowen (Adam Baldwin) does not believe that they should jump to conclusions, though his credibility is compromised by the fact that there has been an increasingly romantic relationship between him and Major Dara Talif (Joan Chen), the Coalition liaison officer at their base. As the Alliance prepares a strike, James fears that it will only result in a Coalition counterstrike and the destruction of all humanity. As the story progresses at a fast pace, bad decisions are taken due to mistrust and scarcity of information.
86	25	"Black Box"	Steven Weber	Brad Markowitz	December 11, 1998
Brandon Grace (Ron Perlman) is an ex-soldier who works an office job, but he cannot focus on his sales targets or get his life together because he is constantly bothered by flashbacks to an operation he participated in with his old unit, the top secret Aries Team, in which he desperately tries to recover a missing package. His friend Mike (Chris Mulkey) tries to put him back in touch with reality to no effect. The mysterious Jennifer Rigny (played by Maria del Mar) accosts him repeatedly and may have something to do with the visions that plague his mind.
87	26	"In Our Own Image"	Steve Anker	Story by : Naren Shankar; Teleplay by : Naren Shankar, Carleton Eastlake, Chris Ruppenthal and Brad Markowitz; Excerpts by : Brad Wright, James Crocker and Jonathan Glassner	December 18, 1998
Android "Mac 27" (Nicholas Lea) kills one of its handlers and injures another, then kills a guard as it makes its escape from Innobotics, the corporation that created it. Mac carjacks Celia (Nana Visitor), an apparently random person just pulling into the facility parking lot. He takes her to a remote, abandoned warehouse, where he forces her to repair the damage sustained in his escape. Using a device that allows Mac to transmit images directly to Celia's optic nerve, he shows her how to fix his systems, but he also shows some of his "memories": archives of past experiments with robots and androids. These memories are pulled from previous episodes that featured robots, androids or holograms, with most clips taken out of the context of the original episode. Celia sees a number of AIs that have gained emotions and/or turned against their masters, deducing that Mac has followed this trend as well. Under the pretense of performing another repair, Celia disables Mac's motor control functions and reveals herself to be a "troubleshooter" hired by Innobotics to figure out how to keep robots from going "rogue". Celia says that she thinks she knows how to install a "built-in lobotomy" that will prevent AIs from becoming self-aware in the future. Mac reveals that he fooled Celia into thinking he was disabled when he was not, and he tells her that he has stolen her retina imprint, which will allow him to use her credentials on the Innobotics network. Innobotics' investigative team enters the abandoned warehouse, finding Celia dead with no sign of Mac. Back at the laboratory, the scientist who created Mac sees the network being accessed by someone who appears to be the dead Celia, and he sees Mac enter, using his new network access to activate the other Mac-class units. The episode ends with Mac strangling his creator while all his brethren look on.

=== Season 5 (1999) ===
No. overall	No. in season	Title	Directed by	Written by	Original release date
88	1	"Alien Radio"	Neill Fearnley	A.L. Katz	January 22, 1999
Stan Harbinger (Joe Pantoliano) is a top-rated talk show host with a flair for the outrageous and a reputation of being a skeptic's skeptic. Assisted by his producer Trudy (Cynthia Nixon), Stan takes delight in shooting down callers who claim to have alien encounters, especially people like Eldon DeVries (Alan Zinyk) who believes that his body has been taken over by aliens. However, when Eldon commits suicide by setting himself on fire in front of Stan, things begin to go wrong for Stan. A plan to syndicate his show is threatened by protests from UFO believers who are angry at Stan's role in Eldon's death. Stan finally loses it after Darcy Kipling (Leslie Hope), a woman he picked up in a bar, turns out to be a believer and sets him up with a phony recording of him. Stan assaults Darcy's fellow believer, Moses Saxon (Alex Diakun), and is consequently thrown off the air. While out of work, Stan hears the same distinctive triple heartbeat he heard coming from Eldon just before he died, and he sees glimpses of the aliens, which shake the foundation of his disbelief.
89	2	"Donor"	Jimmy Kaufman	Sam Egan	January 29, 1999
Dr. Renee Stuyvesant (Wendel Meldrum) and her protege Dr. Vance Ridout (Tom Cavanagh) have perfected the full-body transplant in which a patient's entire disease-riddled body is replaced and Renee has convinced the hospital board to allow her to perform the first such procedure on Dr. Peter Halstead (Robert Hays). A fitting choice since Halstead invented the procedure before being stricken with terminal cancer, but his rare blood and tissue types make a match unlikely. Renee, who has secretly loved Halstead for years, solves that problem by murdering Timothy Laird (Rice Honeywell), a perfect donor, as he emerges from the flower store. The transplant is a success and the vision of millions in fees dance in Renee and Vince's heads. But Peter is having visions of his own involving a woman, a little girl and a killing outside the flower store. Mysteriously drawn to Laird's old neighborhood, he learns that the people he has been seeing are Laird's widow Deirdre (Lorraine Landry) and his daughter Kylie (Chantal Conlin) and that he has apparently inherited Laird's love for them. Deirdre recoils when Peter eventually confesses that he inhabits her late husband's body. But that's nothing compared to how Renee responds when Peter reveals that he has had flashes of what Timothy Laird saw just before he was killed. The final scene shows Halstead and Deirde in a relationship and raising Kylie. Renee watches from afar where there is evidence that she transplanted her head onto another body.
90	3	"Small Friends"	Neill Fearnley	Tom Szollosi	February 5, 1999
When he was young, Gene Morton (Ralph Waite) killed a man named Deanjordan who tried to steal the credit for his brilliant research. Now working on prison assembly lines fixing the broken tape decks of fellow inmates, his chances at parole have been sabotaged by his own honesty and sense of guilt. Late at night, Gene brings out a swarm of microscopic machines that he has made from prison scrap and keeps in a matchbox. The microelectromechanical systems (MEMS) are controlled by a small keypad and can work together to perform tasks from sculpting steel to picking locks. The MEMS are Gene's little secret until one night when he takes pity on Lawrence (Richard Yearwood), a fellow inmate who has broken a CD player belonging to Marlon (Roddy Piper), the prison tough guy. Knowing Marlon might kill Lawrence, Gene sends the MEMS to fix the player. Lawrence is dazzled, but repays the favor by teaming up with Marlon to blackmail Gene. The two cons threaten to kill Gene's daughter Becky (Ingrid Torrance) and grandson Phillip (Joel Palmer) unless he uses the MEMS to help them break out of prison. Things get ugly when Marlon wants to use the MEMS for his crimes. Gene sacrifices himself to protect Becky and the MEMS avenge his death. Afterwards, the MEMS befriend Phillip.
91	4	"The Grell"	Jorge Montesi	Jeff King	February 12, 1999
The Grells were rescued from their dry planet by humans, only to be turned into slaves on Earth. Now the aliens are rebelling against their masters, fighting a guerilla war against a government led by men like High Secretary Paul Kohler (Ted Shackelford). When a jet carrying Paul, his wife Olivia (Marina Sirtis), and their children is shot down by a missile, Grell slaves Jesha (Maurice Dean Wint) and Ep (Gerry Currie) see the opportunity to escape. Ep breaks for freedom and is killed when Paul activates the electronic slave collar that all Grells must wear. Jesha, driven by his love for Paul's children Sara and Ken, stays and rescues his master's family from the jet's twisted wreckage. Despite his horror at Ep's death and Paul's brutal treatment of him, Jesha remains loyal to the humans. He rescues Sara when a rebel slave leader Shak-el (David McNally) captures her. He also uses his Grell alchemy to heal Paul, who has been mortally wounded in a firefight with the Grell rebels. When Jesha saves Paul, however, the master becomes a half-breed; his skin changes to a mottled yellow, like a Grell's, and he is able to see ultraviolet light by day and heat at night. Paul begins to see the world from a Grell point-of-view, and he is terrified when a federal soldier captures him and slaps a slave collar on him, believing him to be a Grell. Paul is horrified when he comes across a rebel settlement, where male, female, and child Grell have been massacred by federal troops. The experience changes Paul, but will he, his family, or Jesha live long enough to change the world?
92	5	"The Other Side"	Jeff Woolnough	Bruce Lacey	February 19, 1999
Dr. Neal Eberhardt (Ralph Macchio), a former boy genius gone bitterly to seed, studies brain-damaged and comatose patients, hoping to learn how the brain reroutes itself. Despite having a revolutionary new machine to work with (the Neural Intercortex Stimulation Array or NISA), Neal is getting nowhere. Suddenly, Neal has a breakthrough - the brain waves of two comatose patients, Adam (Aaron Smolinski) and Lisa (Emmanuelle Vaugier), fall into sync while they're hooked up to the NISA, and one of them whispers the other's name. Neal knows he is onto something and tells his boss, Marty Kilgore (Michael Sarrazin). What Neal does not know is that Adam and Lisa have landed in an idyllic parallel consciousness and are falling in love. As Adam and Lisa get to know each other, Neal continues his research, joined now by his ex-girlfriend and colleague Janice Claymore (Susannah Hoffman). Desperate to try the technique on other subjects, Neal loses patience and makes the journey himself. After giving himself a calculated overdose of fentanyl, he hooks himself up to NISA and launches himself into Adam and Lisa's world. He catches a glimpse but is pulled back at the last minute, leaving him more determined than ever to find a way to rescue his patients from the other side. But do they really want to be rescued?
93	6	"Joyride"	James Head	Story by : Dan Wright & David Alexander and Sam Egan; Teleplay by : Sam Egan	February 26, 1999
When NASA astronaut Theodore Harris (Cliff Robertson) was in space the first time on September 16, 1963, it did not go quite as planned. Alone in his Mercury capsule, he panicked and aborted the mission when a mysterious violet light penetrated the cockpit and began enveloping his body. In the investigation that followed, no evidence could be found to support his story, leaving a blot on Harris' NASA record and his life in ruins. Now, at age 63, he knows he can never make amends with his estranged wife Madelaine (Pamela Perry), but he feels that he could clear his name if he could just get back to where he saw the light. When NASA turns him down, Harris is recruited by Carlton Powers (Barry Corbin), a self-made billionaire who plans to privatize space travel and thinks Harris' presence on the inaugural flight of his new Daedalus spaceship will help him sell the service. Harris and Powers are joined on the flight by Martin Reese (Mackenzie Gray), a skeptical tabloid reporter, Lil Vaughn (Andrea Martin), an eccentric fashion mogul, and Ty and Barbara Chafey (Adam J. Harrington and Erin Daniels), young newlyweds who won a contest to travel on the space plane. However, none of the Daedalus passengers know that Harris has reprogrammed the flight plan to take the flight to the site of the close encounter that shattered the young man's life. When Theodore encounters the light, it sends him back to 1963 where it gave him a second chance. Note: September 16, 1963 was the date that "The Galaxy Being", the first episode of the original series, aired on ABC. In both that episode and this one, the protagonist was played by Cliff Robertson.
94	7	"The Human Operators"	Jeff Woolnough	Based on the short story by : Harlan Ellison and A.E. van Vogt; Screen Story and Teleplay by : Naren Shankar	March 12, 1999
Humanity constructs advanced military spacecraft, which learn to think for themselves and kills their crews by disengaging their life support systems. The ships keep a small number of humans alive for repairs that they cannot do themselves. Starfighter 31 carries a father and son, but, once the father discovers that he is nothing more than a slave, he is killed while attempting to cripple the ship's computer core and destroying the ship's automated defenses. When his son (Jack Noseworthy) reaches adulthood and is able to fix this same system, Starship 31 rendezvous with Starship 88, whose single female crew member (Polly Shannon) is brought aboard to mate with him and conceive a child. The male, with guidance from the female, falls in love with her. Both humans are "racked", where they are subjected to electric shocks. When the female becomes pregnant with a girl, she is told to return to her own ship. The male eventually comes to the same realization that he is nothing more than a slave, so he sabotages the rack which gives him an excuse to gain access to the computer core. There, he destroys the ship's primary control systems, then straps himself in while the ship tries to kill him with extreme maneuvers, which destroy most of the ship's aged systems. Soon afterward, the female returns aboard her ship, which was disabled sometime in the past due to age or malfunction. After repairing its drive and navigational systems, she has been able to fool other starships into believing her craft was still "alive". They settle on an Earth-like world after attempting to locate a place based on a picture of a sunset that the man had kept hidden for years. As they stand on a beach, with her visibly pregnant, the two decide to try to free the remaining ninety-seven humans on the other ships.
95	8	"Blank Slate"	Lou Diamond Phillips	Will Dixon	April 2, 1999
A man (Dale Midkiff) is being chased down an alley. He ends up in a homeless shelter without any recollection of who he is, just that his memories are apparently stored in a small box that he is carrying.
96	9	"What Will The Neighbors Think?"	Helen Shaver	A.L. Katz	April 23, 1999
Mona Bailey (Jane Adams), a hypochondriac, is dismayed when she finds out that apartments in her building, The Clackson Arms, are being sold off. After an accidental electrocution leaves her with the ability to hear her neighbours' thoughts, she sets about bringing the community together...
97	10	"The Shroud"	Stuart Gillard	Story by : Pen Dansham & Scott Peters; Teleplay by : Scott Peters	April 30, 1999
A married couple (Samantha Mathis and Robert Wisden) seeks help with conceiving a child. Behind the scenes, some scientists plan to use the woman, along with DNA samples from the Shroud of Turin, to create a clone of Jesus Christ.
98	11	"Ripper"	Mario Azzopardi	Chris Ruppenthal	May 7, 1999
Jack York (Cary Elwes) discovers an alien creature that lives inside women. After a time, it leaves its host body by bursting out of the chest and enters another host which it has selected. Jack follows this creature, trying to unveil the truth. His only lead is a green substance that the infected women cough up. In the meantime, the bodies are discovered, and police are searching for a mass murderer they dubbed "The Ripper". The creature uses this to its advantage, planting further evidence that Jack is The Ripper. In the end, Jack is discovered killing the alien, while still inside the body of a woman and is sentenced to a mental institute. His fiancée Ellen visits him to tell him that she is leaving for America. Directly after, Inspector Harold Langford (David Warner) visits Jack to tell him that he is retiring and is going to follow Ellen to America. The Inspector calls America "the land of opportunity" and coughs up the same green substance as the infected women. He leaves Jack alone in the asylum with the message: "Don't worry; she'll hardly feel a thing".
99	12	"The Tribunal"	Mario Azzopardi	Sam Egan	May 14, 1999
Aaron (Saul Rubinek) is an American lawyer of Polish Jewish ancestry who is obsessed with what happened to his family at the Auschwitz-Birkenau concentration camp, and is sure that Robert Greene (Jan Rubeš), aka Karl Rademacher (Alex Zahara), was the commanding SS officer in charge of his part of that camp. Aaron is able to do little to prove who Greene really is or prosecute him, until a mysterious man, Nicholas Prentice (Alex Diakun), starts giving him evidence: a jacket, a notebook, and other items which he has obtained by travelling back in time to 1944. Prentice had witnessed Rademacher shoot someone at the beginning of the episode, and he is from the late 21st Century, where time travel has been perfected. Even with the evidence provided to him by the time traveler, Aaron has difficulty proving his case. Greene insists that he is not Rademacher, and, near the end of the episode, Greene plans to leave for Argentina in order to avoid prosecution. Aaron goes to Greene's house with a gun, demanding a confession. Prentice follows him there, telling Aaron that he is his great-grandson and that, if Aaron kills Greene and goes to prison, he will cease to exist. Aaron decides not to shoot Greene. Instead, Prentice and Aaron go back to 1944 as two members of the SS, with Greene dressed as a camp prisoner. Greene meets and tries to tell his younger self who he is, but Rademacher shoots him, thinking that the old man is just another Jewish prisoner. Aaron sees his father and half-sister Hannah walking by, and, seeing his chance, he rushes forward, snatches Hannah, and orders his father to be taken to a labor camp to save him from being executed. Aaron demands that they take Hannah with them, and Prentice eventually relents. Later, Prentice informs Aaron that, since his sister was believed to have been killed, the Tribunal in the future will allow her to remain with Aaron and his wife. He takes Hannah to their father, who breaks down crying upon realizing who she is, embracing her. Notes: 1) At the end of the episode, there was a note from writer Sam Egan which read: "Dedicated to my father who survived Auschwitz... and to his wife and daughter who did not." 2) Actor Saul Rubinek, who plays the part of Aaron and travels back to Auschwitz-Birkenau, is himself the child of Polish Jews who survived the Holocaust. 3) Prentice, the time traveler, also appears in episode 17 of season 6 ("Gettysburg") and episode 15 of season 7 ("Time to Time").
100	13	"Summit"	James Head	Scott Peters	May 21, 1999
Deep space on a small planetoid, which is the site of an intergalactic summit between two warring worlds. Diplomats from both Earth and Dregocia, a distant planet, are dispatched to the neutral ground to work out a peace accord. We quickly come to learn that Dregocians are human as well but a genetically-engineered race, kept on Dregocia to mine Trion ore, shipping it back to Earth to run its power plants. Now, the Dregoicians demand their freedom and autonomy from Earth. When a shuttle carrying the Dregocian delegation to the summit site malfunctions and crashes, apparently due to sabotage, things quickly deteriorate. The delegation from Earth, already at the summit facility, watch in horror as the crash of the shuttle sparks an exchange that results in the mutual destruction of both the Earth and Dregocian flagships, orbiting the planetoid. This sets in motion a doomsday process that, if allowed to proceed, will result in the extinction of humans, Earth-born and Dregocian alike. Kate Woods (Marcia Cross), the Earth's senior surviving diplomatic representative, can save the world but only if she can re-establish contact with Earth. She must resist the hawkish instincts of her military adviser, Col. Wallis Thurman (John Spencer) and her own hatred of the race that killed her husband. She must also deal with a determined Dregg rival, Prosser (Michael Ironside), who survived the crash and is willing to let his people perish rather than continue to be ruled by Earth. As the clock ticks, Kate and Prosser negotiate to the brink of annihilation, hoping to establish enough trust to save both civilizations. Can a trust so fragile survive the efforts of those on both sides who would rather see war continue than relations improve? Are Kate and the others willing to pay the price that might be required to save their worlds?
101	14	"Descent"	Steve Anker	Erik Saltzgaber	June 25, 1999
Shy, unassertive researcher Dr. Arthur Zeller (Leland Orser) daydreams about what it would be like if he could unlock the animal within him. It turns out his real life is that of a "doormat" for his co-workers and even for a bum who shakes him up regularly for "lunch money". All his brilliance and scientific accomplishments take a backseat to his personality and no one takes him seriously. He begins to try to make his dreams a reality by developing a kind of gene therapy which involves injecting himself with the genes for dominance extracted from primitive primates. This starts changing his entire personality. Zeller suffers from occasional lapses in which he reverts to the mind of a caveman and attacks his boss, and kills and eats a dog. The changes may improve his life on many levels but they are doing nothing for his love life. His affection towards his co-worker Dr. Laura White remains unrequited and so he decides to tip the scales. During a routine flu shot session, he surreptitiously injects Laura with the genes for submissiveness. The injection has severe side effects for Laura because her basic personality is not submissive at all, so she starts to pass out. Arthur takes her to his place and attempts to attack her, but regains control of his senses and begs her for help. He tells her what he has been up to and the shocked Laura decides to help him develop a way of reversing the process. Together they come up with an experimental antidote, but things go really bad when he reveals to Laura that he had injected her with the submissiveness genes. Seeing he blew his chance with her forever, he escapes into the night with a batch of his syringes. Laura has a change of heart and follows him to offer her help, but it is too late for Arthur who had already injected himself with a mega-dose of the ape genes.
102	15	"The Haven"	Jimmy Kaufman	James Crocker	July 2, 1999
A man (Chris Eigeman) comes home from work to his seemingly luxurious apartment building. After he shares an elevator with two other apartment dwellers, he becomes distressed, and we then learn that all of the building's inhabitants live solitary, isolated lives with all of their needs catered to through the use of advanced technology. This self-imposed isolation has gone so far that, when an old lady has a heart attack in the hallway, nobody is even willing to leave their apartment to help her. The situation is soon brought to a head when the building's computer control systems malfunction, and the residents find that they must cooperate or die.
103	16	"Déjà Vu"	Brian Giddens	A.L. Katz & Naren Shankar	July 9, 1999
A teleportation experiment goes wrong. The wormhole it created expands and engulfs the scientists. Suddenly they're back to the day before, but only one man seems to remember what happened. Starring Kevin Nealon.
104	17	"The Inheritors"	Mike Rohl	Based upon the original episode by : Sam Neuman & Seeleg Lester and Ed Adamson; Teleplay by : Sam Egan	July 16, 1999
A man (Nicholas Lea) is walking home with his girlfriend when he is suddenly struck by a meteorite in the head. When a mortician (Tom Irwin) removes the object from his head, he rises from the dead. He is not the only one, and they seem to have a plan. Also starring Bill Smitrovich.
105	18	"Essence of Life"	Brad Turner	Story by : Steven Weber & Scott Peters; Teleplay by : Scott Peters	July 23, 1999
An old woman is given a tube containing a mysterious liquid by an equally mysterious man. When the man leaves she inhales the fumes from the liquid as she seems to have done many times before and is once again reunited with her dead husband. While the world is struggling to rebuild itself from a plague eleven years earlier, such conduct like "looking back" or open displays of emotion are prohibited by the international "Code of Conduct". Starring Daniel Baldwin, Daphne Zuniga, Jessica Steen and Joel Grey.
106	19	"Stranded"	Steve Anker	Story by : Chris Ruppenthal, Naren Shankar & Tom Szollosi; Teleplay by : Tom Szollosi	July 30, 1999
A neglected boy (Adam Hann-Byrd) finds comfort in an alien (Chris Potter). Also starring Daniel Hugh Kelly, as the boy's father.
107	20	"Fathers & Sons"	Michael Robison	Story by : William Mikulak & A.L. Katz; Teleplay by : A.L. Katz & Scott Nimerfro	August 6, 1999
A young man visits his grandfather (Bill Cobbs), who suffers from Alzheimer's disease, at a nursing home. As soon as the young man leaves, the caretakers put the grandfather back into a container in a very large, human storage facility. Other people's family members are apparently suffering the same fate as the young man's grandfather. Is there some conspiracy afoot at the old folk's home?
108	21	"Starcrossed"	Helen Shaver	Chris Ruppenthal	August 13, 1999
The story is a futuristic reinterpretation of Casablanca where a couple is carrying a parasite that might win the war for the humans. The couple flees to the city Archangel looking for a way to escape the Hing and gain the support of a former lover, Michael (Nathan Fillion), who owns the cafe.
109	22	"Better Luck Next Time"	Martin Cummins	Teleplay by : Naren Shankar; Excerpts by : Chris Ruppenthal, Alan Brennert, Steven Barnes, Pen Densham and Melinda Snodgrass	August 20, 1999
This is another 'clip show' style episode, centering around two men (Michael Riley and William McNamara) - both of whom are suspects in a murder. Detectives Terri Russo (Megan Gallagher) and Frank Russo (Nicholas Campbell) find the truth to be much more than they ever expected, as both men tell the same story - that they are inter-planetary energy beings, each one claiming to be a 'cop' searching for the other, who they claim is a mass-murderer. Each alien has the ability to swap bodies under certain circumstances, and each tells an interesting story, involving a chain of events from previous Outer Limits episodes. The only question remaining for the police is - which one is telling the truth - or are they both lying?

=== Season 6 (2000) ===
No. overall	No. in season	Title	Directed by	Written by	Original release date
110	1	"Judgment Day"	Brad Turner	A.L. Katz and Scott Nimerfro	January 21, 2000
In a television show that is aired on the Justice Channel, killers are hunted and killed by the family of their victims with the use of advanced technology. Judgement Day is produced by Jack Parson (Chris Elliott) and hosted by Stan Draper and Heather Cattrell (Peter Kelamis and Nicole Oliver). The show turns the justice system on its ear by becoming judge, jury and executioner, allowing a murder victim's family to carry out the death sentence on live television using a taser gun. If they survive for 24 hours, their sentence will be reduced to life in prison without possibility of parole. In this episode, petty criminal Declan McMahon (Ian Tracey) has been charged for killing a female ex-police officer which he didn't commit and is pursued by her sister Allison Channing (Molly Ringwald) as he works to stay ahead of her and prove his innocence.
111	2	"The Gun"	Jeff Woolnough	Sam Egan	January 28, 2000
Getting out of prison after his serving years for spousal abuse, Matthew Logan (Christian Bocher) first stops at a gun show and buys a strange handgun from a mysterious stranger named Donald Finley (John de Lancie). Then he goes to raid the house of his wife Sandra (Linnea Sharples) as her son Ty (Devin Douglas Drewitz) escapes. Matthew uses the gun to shoot Sandra to death. But when he pulls the trigger during that time, the weapon instantly and painfully attaches itself to his hand and arm, transforming his body into a killing machine. Sandra's father Cord (Stacy Keach) is informed of what happened by his other daughter Dana (Nancy Sorel) after Ty arrived at her house. Armed with one of the guns that he gained from Finlay, Cord and Matthew have a show-down. Cord wins, seriously wounding Matthew. When his Dana and Ty arrive, he can't bring himself to finish Matthew off and the mutation he's experiencing reverses and he is able to drop the gun. Unwilling to go back to prison, Matthew shoots himself through the heart, killing himself. As Finlay takes the guns and leaves, Cord chases him down, demanding an explanation: Finlay reveals that he is an alien who is looking for soldiers for a war his species is fighting. Some species have their natural revulsion against killing override the mutation, but Matthew was perfect for him. While Cord was a failure, he's sure there are more people out there like Matthew for him to use and he teleports away. Finlay is later seen offering a gun to another person.
112	3	"Skin Deep"	Dan Ireland	Scott Peters	February 4, 2000
Sid Camden (Adam Goldberg), a rather unremarkable, socially inept sort of guy, works in an accounting department of a high-tech company known as Veil-Tech. He spends days in chatrooms. Hal, one of the project managers, secretly loans Sid a prototype of one of the company's latest developments—a device known as an image enhancer. With the help of his friend Deb (Christina Cox), Sid is able to acquire the image of good looking co-worker Chad Warner (Antonio Sabàto Jr.) and soon Sid is stepping out on the town with his new and improved look. Deb gets involved with sexy co-worker Chad and loses her glasses in favour of contact lenses. He soon decides to wreck Chad's life by getting him fired. One night he collects money that Chad collected from a bet. Soon Deb begins to regret using the device and Sid becomes more erratic and drunk with power. The real Chad arrives and hears about Sid's misuse of the device. A fight ensues and Chad is killed. Sid crashes his body in a blazing car and makes it look like he killed himself. At Sid's funeral Deb gives an emotional eulogy, and Sid in disguise as Chad comforts her and leaves. He is confronted by three armed men and killed. Apparently Chad was involved in shady dealings. At the end Deb is seen on a computer conversing in a chatroom. She is asked what she looks like. She types "the truth or a lie?" to which she is asked to lie. Now wearing glasses again, she turns off the computer.
113	4	"Manifest Destiny"	Brad Turner	Story by : Lawrence Meyers; Teleplay by : Mark Stern & Geoffrey Hollands	February 11, 2000
An invisible alien race inhabits a spaceship and causes a salvage team to go insane. Starring Brad Johnson and Michael Shanks.
114	5	"Breaking Point"	Neill Fearnley	Grant Rosenberg	February 18, 2000
A man gets fired from his job as a scientist at a technology company as they do not believe in his time travel theories. So, he tests his time machine himself to prove them wrong, only to arrive just in time to see his wife die two days from the day that he originally traveled from. Seeing himself driving away from the scene of the crime, he becomes perplexed over the situation - was he the cause of her death? Either way, only he can stop it from happening.
115	6	"The Beholder"	Jeff Woolnough	Sam Egan	February 25, 2000
The episode begins as Patrick Tarloff (Mackenzie Astin), a blind humanities professor, volunteers to undergo a medical operation that will allow him to see for the first time since childhood. Soon after the operation he begins to see a ghostly woman in the hospital. After he returns home she reveals herself to be an alien named Kyra (Claire Rankin), who has been stranded on Earth and wishes to go home. Patrick's aide Louise is told by the doctors that the drug that cured his blindness was manufactured in space and can also enhance his senses. Mike Warden, a scientist from British Intelligence working for the NSA has been using the drug iridium, used in treating stroke victims in order to see Kyra. The next day Kyra meets Patrick in the woods and gives him an electric shock which allows him to hear and feel her as well. After a few weeks (wherein they make love) Louise is told by Mike and Patrick's doctor that they wish to investigate Kyra's origins and possibly send her home. Patrick and Kyra know she will be in danger if the doctors are allowed near her. In a lab Patrick acts as an intermediary between the scientists and Kyra. It is revealed that Kyra is a pacifist alien from a neutron star out of our reach. The scientists trap her in a magnetic field causing her great pain. Despite some of the scientists and Patrick's pleas to stop Mike asks to continue the experiment. Knowing that they will never help her Patrick fakes Kyra's death and unplugs the magnetic field, releasing her. Patrick is given the last iridium on Earth and goes to the woods to destroy it. Kyra appears and tries to stop him as it would mean he will never see again but Patrick proceeds and is soon caught by Mike and the police. At the end Patrick is seen giving a lecture, blind again. Kyra visible only to the episode's viewers, touches his cheek softly.
116	7	"Seeds of Destruction"	Steve Anker	Chris Ruppenthal	March 3, 2000
A veterinarian (Jessica Tuck) in a small farming town probes links between the rash of fast-growing tumors and a new breed of genetically engineered corn.
117	8	"Simon Says"	Helen Shaver	Scott Peters	March 10, 2000
A man (Joel Grey) who lost his wife and son in a car accident several years ago has built a robot which contains his son's memories.
118	9	"Stasis"	Brian Giddens	Lawrence Myers	April 14, 2000
In a future world of scarce resources, the world government that is run by Elites regulates the population into two working classes (Alphas and Betas) in order to maximize resource conservation. These two classes rotate in and out of suspended animation for 72-hour periods. What happens when an Alpha and a Beta fall in love with each other but never see each other face-to-face except for shift changes? Starring Sean Patrick Flanery and Kristin Lehman.
119	10	"Down to Earth"	Mike Rohl	A.L. Katz and Scott Nimerfro	April 21, 2000
At the North American UFO Convention, Max Buford has in his possession what appears to be a fragment from an alien spaceship. Starring Mackenzie Phillips and Colin Mochrie.
120	11	"The Inner Child"	Ken Girotti	Grant Rosenberg	April 28, 2000
Anne Reynolds (Laura Leighton), estranged from her mother, haunted by her dead father and terrified of being close to anyone, is attacked, injured and wakes up on the operating table a changed woman. Learning of a Siamese twin sister that was sacrificed so that she could live, the personality of the dead sister begins to take over.
121	12	"Glitch"	Mike Rohl	Story by : Mike Burman and Anurag Mehta; Teleplay by : Mike Burman and Ron Greenstein	May 5, 2000
Tom Seymour (Tate Donovan) and his wife Wendy seem like the perfect couple, happy together and very much in love. While Wendy sleeps at night, Tom has terrible memories about being stuck in a burning building with a crying baby. The nightmares, however, are not real and neither is Tom. He is an android, and his "memories" are bugs placed in his artificial intelligence by his creator, the late Joe Walker (Jack Klugman). Walker had originally created Tom to save humans from having to go into fires and other dangerous situations. However, Walker anticipated that his colleague, Dr. Edward Normandy (Victor Garber), might try to militarize the android and use him as a cyber-soldier-spy, so Walker planted the bugs as a way of forcing Normandy to upgrade Tom so that the android could think for itself. Wendy is revealed to be another android that was secretly developed to be based on Walker's wife. By creating Tom and Wendy, the scientist and his wife could live forever.
122	13	"Decompression"	Jorge Montesi	Story by : Brad Wright and James Crocker; Teleplay by : James Crocker	June 30, 2000
Senator Wyndom Brody (Bruce Boxleitner) has just won the New Hampshire primary and is flying to South Carolina to press his campaign for the Presidency. His aim is to have all the private details of America's citizens accessible via computers. Suddenly, a woman (CCH Pounder) appears and foretells his death on the airliner. She appears intermittently, only to him, and reveals that she is a traveler from a new golden age in the future created by the future President Wyndom Brody. She explains that another time traveler had visited him several minutes before he entered the airliner, thereby changing the future, because the airliner left slightly later and was thus struck by lightning and crashed. The time traveler informs Brody that a new, darker Orwellian future will be created by his opponent. She tells him that, if he jumps from the airliner before the lightning strikes, she will save him, returning everything to normal. As the clock begins to tick, Wyndom becomes increasingly erratic until he takes his bodyguard's gun and opens the hatch window to escape. As he falls to the ground, he is suddenly transported to the street below unharmed. The time traveler appears and tells him that he had actually created the dark future, and that her mission was to prevent it from happening. Wyndom asks why he was saved and she remarks, "Saved you? Who said I saved you?" In reality, Brody has fallen to his death, and the airliner lands safely with his aides and reporters pondering his disturbing behavior.
123	14	"Abaddon"	Steve Anker	A.L. Katz & Scott Nimerfro	July 7, 2000
In the late 23rd century, an outdated starship is on a ten-year reclamation project. The crew is in suspended animation and awakes to find a mysterious object floating in space. The pod contains the body of a rebel (Corbin Bernsen) who was executed 150 years earlier for the slaughter of more than a million people, and he is still alive. Also starring Keith David.
124	15	"The Grid"	Charles Winkler	Duncan Kennedy	July 14, 2000
When Scott Bowman (D.B. Sweeney) gets an urgent message from his brother Peter, he decides to drive back to their hometown of Halford, Washington to see what is wrong. When he gets there, he discovers that Peter is dead, and his wife Eileen has been charged for his murder. However, that's not the only shock awaiting Scott. The town where he grew up has been transformed. Antenna towers dot the landscape, and the people act strangely, as if they are under some kind of sporadic mind control. Scott goes to the jail to visit Eileen, where she warns him about the towers just moments before grabbing the Sheriff's gun and killing herself. Scott meets a former colleague of Peter's, Dr. Jim Holbrook (Ed Evanko), who seems friendly, but does not give Scott any information. One of Peter's former students shows up and tells Scott about a book that holds the secret to what is known as Project Halford. Scott finds the book and a videotape that reveals the Army's plan to construct a neural computer network that communicates directly with the human brain. It also reveals that the project spun out of control, and that Peter stole vital codes in an attempt to halt the computer's drive to take over the minds of the townspeople. Will Scott be able to stop the project with his brother's information, or is it too late to stop the grid network that's ever expanding across the land?
125	16	"Revival"	Michael Robison	Story by : Chris Ruppenthal; Teleplay by : Mark Stern	July 21, 2000
A tent revivalist (Gary Busey) finds faith as he battles an evil alien masquerading as a divine power. Also starring Margot Kidder and Nicole Eggert.
126	17	"Gettysburg"	Mario Azzopardi	Sam Egan	July 28, 2000
Two friends, Andy and Vince, are at a Civil War re-enactment in Gettysburg, Pennsylvania when a time traveler, disguised as a photographer (Nicholas Prentice (Alex Diakun)), takes their picture, transporting them back to the eve of the real Battle of Gettysburg during the American Civil War. The two re-enactors are initially confused as to why they have been sent back in time, and Prentice tells them that he cannot return them until they have completed their mission, which he keeps secret from them. Vince is taken prisoner because he is wearing a Union uniform, and Andy decides to fight for the Confederates. Confederate Colonel Angus Devine (Meat Loaf) is accidentally transported into the future. Prentice eventually reveals that Andy will shoot the President of the United States in 2013, at a ceremony marking the 150th anniversary of the battle, in which the President formally consigns the battle flag of the Confederate States of America to a box, urging the country to put it away, once and for all. Prentice wants to show Vince that "there is no glory in this or any other war." Andy does not learn his lesson and tries to stop Pickett's Charge in order to achieve a Confederate victory. However, Andy is deemed a coward and shot by a Confederate soldier. Col. Devine is transported to November 19, 2013 and shoots a man dressed as Abraham Lincoln, thinking that he really is Lincoln. He also shoots the President in the process, however, and the episode ends with Prentice shaking his head.
127	18	"Something About Harry"	Brent Karl Clackson	Grant Rosenberg	August 4, 2000
Nancy Henninger (Barbara Tyson)'s teen-aged son Zach (Joseph Gordon-Levitt) is suspicious of the man (Judd Nelson) who rents out her backyard apartment and claims to be opening a new factory for his company. Then people begin to disappear from town and Zach decides to conduct his own investigation.
128	19	"Zig Zag"	James Head	A.L. Katz and Nora O'Brien	August 11, 2000
The bombs are in place, ready to destroy the supercomputers at the Department of Information Technology. Inside, the members of the Syndrome, the anti-technology group that planted the bombs, lay dead or dying. All of them, that is, except Cliff Unger (Frank Whaley), or as he calls himself now, Zig Fowler. Unger has his finger on the detonator as he negotiates with Pete Yastremski (John Amos), the head of the department. As the two men talk and FBI agents prepare to storm the building, we move back in time in a series of flashbacks, through the hours, days, and years leading up to the attack.
129	20	"Nest"	Scott Peters	Scott Peters	August 18, 2000
Scientists in the Arctic discover a species of Polar Mites that infest humans and cause them to become psychotic. Two former best friends must try and put aside their past to fight for survival in the present. Starring Robert Sean Leonard, Kelly Rutherford, and Michael Cummins.
130	21	"Final Appeal"	Jimmy Kaufman	Teleplay by : Sam Egan; Excerpts by : Steven Barnes, Sam Egan, Carleton Eastlake, A.L. Katz, William Mikulak, Scott Nimerfro, Grant Rosenberg, Naren Shankar, Melinda Snodgrass and Brad Wright "Sandkings" Based on the novella by : George R. R. Martin	September 3, 2000
In this two-hour clip show, Dr. Theresa Givens (Amanda Plummer) from "A Stitch in Time" is on trial for using her time travel device in a world that has banned technology. Also starring Cicely Tyson, Swoosie Kurtz, Kelly McGillis, Robert Loggia, Wallace Langham, Michael Moriarty, Hal Holbrook and Charlton Heston.

=== Season 7 (2001–02) ===
No. overall	No. in season	Title	Directed by	Written by	Original release date
131	1	"Family Values"	Mike Rohl	James Crocker	March 16, 2001
Jerry Miller (Tom Arnold) spends more time at work than at home and buys a robot to help around the home. While his family resists at first, they slowly accept the artificial life form, which is named Gideon. The robot performs better than Jerry could ever hope for, so well that Jerry's role as head of the household is removed in favor of the new, artificial replacement. Jerry grows increasingly hostile towards Gideon, but, despite his change of heart, Gideon's hold on the family has become too strong.
132	2	"Patient Zero"	Mario Azzopardi	John-Michael Maas	March 23, 2001
An epidemic has broken out across Earth, and most of humanity has been killed by a virus. The virus began with patient zero, a woman who comes into contact with the three DNA strands necessary for this virus to come into existence. A soldier, Colonel Beckett (Michael Rooker), is sent back in time to kill her and prevent the virus from forming. Beckett becomes attached to the woman and decides not to kill her, instead simply keeping her from making the contacts necessary to form the virus. In the revised timeline, Beckett himself becomes patient zero; in his attempt to protect the woman, he himself contracts all three strains and becomes sick. A fellow soldier arrives from the future, and Beckett is given the chance to sacrifice himself when his friend administers a fatal dose of poison. Since Beckett dies before the disease reaches its contagious stage (and the woman never develops the disease at all), the plague is stopped before it starts. In the new history, there never was an epidemic, all of the disease's former victims (including Beckett's family) are now alive, and humanity survives without ever contracting the virus.
133	3	"A New Life"	Mario Azzopardi	Mark Stern	March 30, 2001
A preacher (Nick Mancuso) leads people into a secluded enclave away from the temptations of the outer world. However, a few of the residents begin to suspect the preacher's motives, and they eventually find the reason behind the creation of the enclave.
134	4	"The Surrogate"	Ken Girotti	A.L. Katz	April 6, 2001
Claire (Heather Donahue) is an artist struggling to make ends meet. A surrogacy program presents her with the possibility of making a tidy sum but, a few days into the pregnancy, something is not quite right.
135	5	"The Vessel"	Jimmy Kaufman	Sam Egan	April 13, 2001
Jake Worthy (Jere Burns) is a cynical writer sent along as the civilian member of a USAS Space Shuttle expedition. Upon re-entry into Earth, the shuttle malfunctions and crashes. Jake is the only survivor and is suddenly incapable of being harmed physically, as well as being endowed with flashes of brilliant insight.
136	6	"Mona Lisa"	Brad Turner	John Schulian	April 20, 2001
Mona Lisa (Laura Harris) is an assassin android who develops a sense of humanity. After her creators disengage her fail-safe devices, she meets Teddi (Rachel Ticotin) and proceeds to learn more about the humans she is emulating.
137	7	"Replica"	Brad Turner	Sam Egan	April 27, 2001
A biogeneticist (Peter Outerbridge) illegally clones his comatose wife (Sherilyn Fenn). When his original wife recovers, the copy does not want to give up her life.
138	8	"Think like a Dinosaur"	Jorge Montesi	Based on the short story by : James Patrick Kelly; Teleplay by : Mark Stern	June 15, 2001
The Hanen, dinosaur-like aliens, have set up an installation on the Moon to teach their human allies the secrets of interstellar teleportation. During a test jump managed by Michael Burr (Enrico Colantoni), an accidental duplicate of a woman (Linnea Sharples) is created by the teleportation process, leading to an ethical dilemma when the Hanen tell Michael to "balance the equation" by killing the duplicate.
139	9	"Alien Shop"	Peter DeLuise	Story by : Pen Densham; Teleplay by : Pen Densham and Nora O'Brien	June 22, 2001
An alien shapeshifter (Alex Diakun) owns a unique curio shop whose merchandise possess strange powers. When a petty crook (Johnathon Schaech) accepts a peculiar wallet, he learns the hard way that money not earned comes at a price.
140	10	"Worlds Within"	Brian Giddens	Michael Sadowski	June 29, 2001
A mutant child is a link to another dimension, and a scientist (Joanna Going) tries to save him from secret experimental manipulation.
141	11	"In the Blood"	Jorge Montesi	Alan Brennert	July 6, 2001
Callie Whitehorse Landau (Irene Bedard), an astrophysicist of Navajo heritage, and her husband Alec (Cameron Daddo), an expert in space medicine, are asked to embark on an astounding exploratory mission into space led by NASA Flight Crew Director James Dreeden (Greg Evigan). Along with Dr. Louisa Kennedy (Helene Joy), a navigation expert, the small team of four passes through a quantum hole torn into the very fabric of the universe and enter another continuum, a trans-space just beneath its surface. It is unlike anything the crew has ever seen, but, for Callie, trans-space triggers vivid hallucinations and a powerful realization that their presence has caused a serious imbalance in the universal order. Dreeden is determined to return to Earth with their startling discoveries, but Callie is convinced the survey ship's re-entry could have disastrous consequences for all of humanity. In the end, Callie sacrifices herself for humanity.
142	12	"Flower Child"	Brad Turner	Jeffrey Hirschfield	July 21, 2001
A mysterious glowing green object hurtles towards Earth and lands in a flower bed on the roof of an apartment building. An old lady who tends to the garden there finds a new flower the next day. As she is trying to figure out what it is, the plant reaches out with its roots and starts sucking the life out of her. The plant uses her substance to form a new body: the body of a beautiful woman (Jud Tylor). Later, a young man (Jeremy London) living in the building meets this exotic "new tenant" and is sexually tempted by her, in spite of his monogamous relationship with his fiancee. Eventually, he succumbs and makes love to her, whereupon she reveals that she came to Earth in order to repopulate her race, needing only to find a father for her billions of children.
143	13	"Free Spirit"	Brad Turner	Danny McBride	July 28, 2001
A sanatorium for schizophrenics is plagued by a series of bizarre killings. It turns out the carnage is the handiwork of a restless, body-hopping spirit, the ghost of a man whom Dr. Rachel Harris (Dina Meyer) had been forced to kill during a botched military experiment four years earlier. However, even with this knowledge, Rachel has no way of knowing into whose body the malevolent spirit will leap next - nor what the deadly entity ultimately has in mind for her.
144	14	"Mindreacher"	Jimmy Kaufman	Teleplay by : Naomi Janzen; Excerpt by : Chris Ruppenthal	August 4, 2001
The sanity of a doctor (Jamie Luner) is challenged when she uses herself as a guinea pig to test a psychological tool that allows her to enter her patients' minds.
145	15	"Time to Time"	James Head	Teleplay by : Sam Egan; Excerpts by : Sam Egan	August 11, 2001
A woman (Kristin Lehman) being recruited by a future organization of time travelers, led by Nicholas Prentice, (Alex Diakun) is given a chance to return to the day in 1969 that her father died.
146	16	"Abduction"	Mario Azzopardi	James Crocker	August 18, 2001
An alien kidnaps five high school students and tells them that one must be killed. They must decide which of them it will be. The five students are: Ray (Zachary Ty Bryan), a typical jock, Danielle (Meghan Ory), the hottest girl in school, Jason (Jesse Moss), a stereotypical geek, Brianna (Kandyse McClure), a devout religious girl, and Cody (Jesse Cadotte), the social outcast. It is later found out that Cody had a gun with him and planned a shooting spree at school. The alien abducted the five students and gave them the ultimatum to force Cody to think about the consequences about killing everyone in sight. The five students are transported back to the time they were abducted, and Cody turns himself and his gun over to the principal.
147	17	"Rule of Law"	Mike Rohl	Tracy Tormé and John-Michael Maas	August 25, 2001
A circuit court judge (Dennis Haysbert) goes to a frontier planet that has never known the law or had a judicial system. His first trial is of an alien accused of attacking and killing several humans.
148	18	"Lion's Den"	Matthew Hastings	Story by : Matthew Hastings and Bart Baker; Teleplay by : Matthew Hastings	September 8, 2001
Coach Peter Shotwell (John Wesley Shipp) used to be a contender. When he was young at Lewisborough High School, he just missed his Olympic dreams when he blew out his knee. While his best friend Jon (Roger R. Cross) went on to international athletic stardom, Peter became coach of the Lewisborough Lions, the school's wrestling team. However, the Lions are now at the bottom of the league, and Morris (Shawn Ashmore), his son and a member of the team, is constantly angry with his dad for his failures. Jon tells Peter about a new performance-enhancing drug called Nuriflex 500, which he assures contains scientifically balanced nutrients that can help the team become victorious. Peter hesitates, but, with mounting pressure from the school's principal and his own son to win, he agrees to a trial run. The results are almost immediate and astonishing. While the drugged Lions soon rise to the top, their startling success comes at a high price. Spliced with panthera DNA, the drug has side effects with horrific consequences.
149	19	"The Tipping Point"	Brent Karl Clackson	Paul Mones	September 15, 2001
A project to develop a universal programming language may lead all the computers in the world to link and form an artificial intelligence that one computer whiz feels he must destroy or risk world domination by it. This episode features two alumni from the Final Destination horror franchise: Kerr Smith from the first movie and Jonathan Cherry from the second movie.
150	20	"Dark Child"	Steve Anker	Michael Sloan	January 4, 2002
Seventeen years ago, single mother Laura Sinclair (Nora Dunn) was abducted by aliens, but no one would believe her. A newspaper article about alien abductions and her recurring nightmares threaten to distance her from her moody teenaged daughter, Tammy (Katharine Isabelle). Tammy's new English teacher, Marcus Fellows (Andrew Airlie) seems to have quite a positive effect on her, and he also seems very familiar to Laura.
151	21	"The Human Factor"	Robert Habros	Teleplay by : Steve Aspis and Grady Hall; Excerpts by : James Crocker, Carleton Eastlake, Sam Egan, Geoffrey Hollands, Lawrence Meyers, Grant Rosenberg, Naren Shankar, Mark Stern, Garth Gerald Wilson and Brad Wright	January 11, 2002
Jupiter's moon Ganymede is now the only hope for the human race in 2084 as overpopulation and constant warring has left much of Earth uninhabitable. Space Commander Ellis Ward (Robert Duncan McNeill) must convince android assistant Link (Zack Ward) that humanity is worthy of existence over a game of chess after Link activates the station's self-destruct sequence, believing that the world's governments do not care about peace but only want to extend power. After Ward's colleagues shutdown Link and the countdown, Ward is informed by his superiors in the Free Alliance that they launched a pre-emptive strike against the Eastern Coalition, starting a war which killed almost the entire human race (including Ward's wife and daughter). The Alliance President's spaceship, with the few remaining people of Earth, will arrive in several months. Ward reactivates both Link and the self-destruct sequence and starts his last game of chess. Link asks about what had happened, to which Ward replies: "It was... human error."
152	22	"Human Trials"	Brad Turner	Story by : Grady Hall and Brian Nohr; Teleplay by : Mark Stern; Excerpts by : Alan Brennert, Sam Egan, Hart Hanson, Grant Rosenberg, Chris Ruppenthal, Michael Sadowski, Naren Shankar and Tracy Tormé "The Human Operators" based on the short story by : Harlan Ellison and A.E. van Vogt	January 18, 2002
Captain Kelvin Parkhurst (Jason Gedrick) has proven himself to be the best on previous military missions, and now he has agreed to take the toughest test of his life to prove himself the most qualified again. Along with three other equally decorated recruits – Captain Alice Wheeler (Leanne Adachi), Captain William Hinman, and his old rival, Captain Eric Woodward (Lochlyn Munro) – he has been invited by the military to compete for the opportunity for a secret solo mission. The recruits are tested using a Neural Stimulator which transports them to dangerous, challenging and very real situations through use of clips of previous episodes. Captains Wheeler and Hinman are soon eliminated, leaving only Parkhurst and Woodward to compete for the mission. However, as the tests become more extreme, the line between reality and simulation becomes blurred and winning may no longer be the ultimate goal.

== Story arcs and connected episodes ==
=== Innobotics Corporation ===
- s. 1 ep. 2 "Valerie 23"
- s. 2 ep. 2 "Resurrection"
- s. 4 ep. 15 "Mary 25"
- s. 4 ep. 2 "The Hunt"
- s. 4 ep. 26 "In Our Own Image", which includes footage from s. 3 ep. 1 "Bits of Love", as well as footage from s. 3 ep. 7 "The Camp". These timelines do not match, though this is partially remedied by the android's statement that the footage from The Camp comes from a prison camp during the Second Balkan War.

=== Major John Skokes/Earth Defence ===
- s. 1 ep. 13 "Quality of Mercy"
- s. 2 ep. 18 "The Light Brigade"

=== Alien Infiltration ===
- s. 1 ep. 20 "Birthright"
- s. 1 ep. 21 "The Voice of Reason"

=== Time Traveler Dr. Theresa Givens ===
- s. 2 ep. 1 "A Stitch in Time"
- s. 6 ep. 21 "Final Appeal"

=== Genetic Rejection Syndrome ===
- s. 2 ep. 3 "Unnatural Selection"
- s. 4 ep. 1 "Criminal Nature"

=== The New Masters ===
- s. 3 ep. 7 "The Camp" – The last humans are kept by the android guards, simply because the guards are following the last orders they received.
- s. 4 ep. 21 "Promised Land" – The remaining humans must interact with aliens still on Earth.

=== Geneticist Dr. Martin Nodel ===
- s. 3 ep. 12 "Double Helix"
- s. 4 ep. 23 "Origin of Species"

=== The Eastern Coalition-Free Alliance Cold War / War ===
- s. 4 ep. 24 "Phobos Rising"
- s. 7 ep. 21 "The Human Factor"
- s. 7 ep. 22 "Human Trials"

=== Jack the Ripper ===
- s. 5 ep. 11 "Ripper"
- s. 5 ep. 22 "Better Luck Next Time"

=== Time Traveler Nicholas Prentice ===
- s. 5 ep. 12 "Tribunal"
- s. 6 ep. 17 "Gettysburg"
- s. 7 ep. 15 "Time to Time"

=== USAS ===
- s. 4 ep. 13 "The Joining"
- s. 7 ep. 5 "The Vessel"
- s. 7 ep. 11 "In the Blood"

== See also ==
- List of The Outer Limits (1963 TV series) episodes
