= Bülent Öztürk =

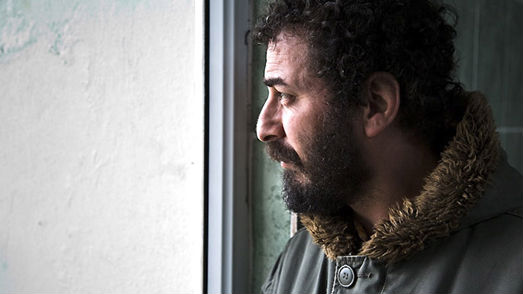
- Born: 16 October 1975 (age 50)
- Notable work: Houses with Small Windows

Bülent Öztürk (1975 in Bağlarbaşı, Urfa, Turkey) is a Belgian-Kurdisch screenwriter and director based in Antwerp, Belgium. His films have been nominated for and celebrated with several (international) awards. His films stand out because of their minimalist and documentary style with spare use of dialogue and the recurrence of socially and culturally concerned themes. His short film Houses with Small Windows (2013) was awarded the title of best European short film at the Venice Film Festival, and was nominated for the 26th European Film Awards in Berlin. In his home country the film received an ‘Ensor’ for best short film at the Ostend Film Festival. Apart from writing and directing two documentaries and three short films, Öztürk presented his first feature film Blue Silence in 2017, with the support of The Flanders Audiovisual Fund (VAF).

Blue Silence caught international attention at the Karlovy Vary International Film Festival, where it won the Fedora Prize (awarded by the Federation of European and Mediterranean Film Critics). At its world premiere at the Istanbul Film Festival, the films won the award of Best Debut and Best Screenplay, alongside winning the Special Jury Prize, and receiving an honorary mention for the Film Award FACE in the category Human Rights, awarded by the European Council. At the Duhok International Film Festival, Blue Silence won the awards of Best Film in Diaspora and Best Scenario.

== Early life and background ==
Öztürk came to Belgium in 1995 as a refugee. He graduated from RITCS Brussels in 2011 with a Master in Audiovisual Arts.

== Film career ==
In his first documentary Time to Time (2010), which he made during his studies at the RITCS, Öztürk follows the life of a villager that was uprooted from the Kurdish town Kiniqe (which later got the Turkish name Bakacik). It was one of the 3700 Kurdish villages in the southeast of Turkey that was evacuated in the 1990s as ordered by the Turkish State. The Turkish army organized the clearance of the villages because it suspected that the Kurdish inhabitants offered their help to members of the Kurdistan Workers’ Party (PKK). The Turkish Army and the PKK had been in an armed conflict since the 1980s. Nevertheless, for his film, the director wanted to focus on the social and human impact rather than on the political story.

After graduating, Öztürk made a second documentary film, Waiting / Beklemek (2012), which shows the devastating impact the earthquake of October 23, 2011 had in the east of Turkey. The film tells the tale of a religious father who lost his daughter in the natural disaster. Parallel to it, the camera follows two poor Kurdish teenagers who are trying to deal with the consequences of the catastrophe in their own way. Öztürk wished to highlight the social and economic subordination of the Kurdish people in this region.

For the short film Houses With Small Windows (2013), Öztürk was inspired by the life of his mother. The film reflects on the tradition of honor killings. Houses With Small Windows received widespread acclaim and won prizes on numerous festivals, such as the award for Best European Short at the Venice Film Festival, the Ensor for Best Flemish Short at the Ostend Film Festival, the Best International Short Film and the Re-Generation Award at the Capabio Cinema Film Festival, the first prize in the Mediterranean and Arab Countries Competition of the Tel Aviv International Student Film Festival, and the Best Kurdish Short Film at the Duhok International Film Festival.

Öztürk’s following short film Shadow (2015) tells the poignant story of two Yezidian sisters and their mother who are fleeing and hiding from a lurking war. The dark, documentary style is complemented by the collaboration of young, non-professional actors. The film won the Prize for Best Short at the Duhok International Film Festival. The Belgian premiere took place at the 42nd edition of Film Fest Gent.

Öztürk made his feature film debut with Blue Silence (2017). Receiving central attention in the film is the ex-undercover agent Hakan (Teoman Kumbaracıbaşı), carrying with him both personal and national secrets. When Hakan is released from the military psychiatric hospital, the processing of his past in the Turkish army continues to infer with his attempts to reconnect with his daughter.

Characteristic to Blue Silence is the meandering exploration of a mental landscape, averse to all traditional narrative structures. The film was shown at the Göteborg Film Festival, São Paulo International Film Festival, CINEMED International Mediterranean Film Festival of Montpellier, International Malatya Film Festival, Film Fest Gent among others.

In 2020, Öztürk created the short film Orphans of the City. This film portrays the life of a single woman, Hilde, in times of the Covid-pandemic and the consequent lockdown. When Hilde’s innermost longings remain unanswered, she is confronted with a lonely reality. The short film was supposed to have its Belgian premiere at the Ostend Film Festival, which unfortunately has been postponed due to the continuing measures imposed on large cultural events to control the pandemic. At the moment, Öztürk is writing the scenario to his second feature whilst working on his third documentary.

== Filmography ==
- Orphans of the City (2020)
- Blue Silence (2017)
- Shadow (2015)
- Houses with small windows (2013)
- Waiting / Beklemek (2012)
- Time to Time/ Zaman Zaman (2010)
