= A Stitch in Time (The Outer Limits) =

- The Outer Limits episode
- Episode no.: Season 2 Episode 1
- Directed by: Mario Azzopardi
- Written by: Steven Barnes
- Production code: 23
- Original air date: 14 January 1996

Guest appearances
- Amanda Plummer as Dr. Theresa Givens; Michelle Forbes as FBI Agent Jamie Pratt; Gary Jones as Duncan; Kendall Cross as Allison Morris; Andrew Airlie as FBI Agent Corey Lonn; Adrian Hughes as Warren; Brian Arnold as Newscaster

Episode chronology
← Previous "The Voice of Reason"	Next → "Resurrection"

"A Stitch in Time" is an episode of the television series The Outer Limits. It first aired on 14 January 1996 and was the first episode of the second season. Amanda Plummer won an Emmy for her appearance in this episode. This episode is also mentioned in the clip show from season six entitled "Final Appeal" and in the clip show "Better Luck Next Time".

== Plot ==
FBI agent Jamie Pratt investigates a series of murders spanning a period of forty years — all committed with the same gun. The gun is traced to Dr. Theresa Givens, a former employee at a top-secret government project. Mysteriously, Givens was only five years old at the time of the first murder, and the gun had not even been manufactured yet.

As it turns out, Dr. Givens has used a property of developing fetal human brains to create a time machine and has been traveling back through time to kill condemned serial killers before they strike, all to prepare herself for one final journey to stop the man who had kidnapped and raped her for five days when she was a teenager, the event having left her scarred all her life.

Another angle of the episode is the rapidly deteriorating physical health of Dr. Givens. She is already mentally scarred from the start from the trauma of her youth, and Dr. Givens's physical health declines throughout the episode. FBI agent Jamie Pratt finally uncovers the truth and Givens eventually discloses to Agent Pratt that an unfortunate side-effect of altering time for the time traveler is the sudden merging of two completely different time streams into the brain at once upon return which, over time, has a visible physical impact (causing nosebleeds) and presumably will become fatal given enough occurrences.

Dr. Givens herself explains at the end that she is finally making the journey to change her past for fear that she will not survive much longer, but Pratt steps into the time machine after Dr. Givens. She assists in stopping the kidnapping and rescues the young Theresa, but the elder Dr. Givens is fatally wounded and dies. Agent Pratt returns to a world where Dr. Givens never experienced the traumatic incident of Theresa of the previous timeline. But without that trauma, Dr. Givens was never motivated to travel back through time and preemptively murder known serial killers, one of whom eventually murdered a close friend of Agent Pratt (at the beginning of the episode this friend was dead, then alive later in the episode thanks to a temporal excursion by Dr. Givens, now dead again).

In the end, Agent Pratt tracks down the decidedly healthier-looking Dr. Theresa Givens in the new timeline, who — despite lacking the motivation of preventing a traumatic event of her past — has also built a time machine, which she knew was possible because, as a 15-year-old girl, she had seen Agent Pratt use one to return to her normal time.

The episode closes with Agent Pratt traveling back to 1980 and shooting the serial killer who would murder her best friend in the future.

== Awards ==
In 1995, for the role of Dr. Theresa Givens, actor Amanda Plummer won an Emmy Award in the category "Outstanding Guest Actress in a Drama Series".
