= Chris Ruppenthal =

American TV and film writer

- Born: June 1, 1955 (age 71); Coral Gables, Florida, U.S.
- Education: A.B. Harvard University; M.A. USC Film School
- Occupations: Television Writer/Producer, Teacher
- Years active: 1980–present
- Employer: Lausd
- Known for: Quantum Leap, The Outer Limits, Moonlighting

Chris Ruppenthal (born as John Christian Ruppenthal on June 1, 1955) is an American television and film writer based in Hollywood, California.

== Life and career ==
Born and raised in Coral Gables, Florida, Ruppenthal received an A.B. Degree from Harvard University in 1976 where he was an Editor of the Harvard Lampoon as well as a member of The Delphic Club and The Hasty Pudding where he performed in three of the famous Hasty Pudding travesty musicals. Following Harvard he worked for a time in New York City in advertising before moving to California to pursue a writing career. He received an M.A. degree from the USC Film School.

Amongst his vast resume as a television producer, Ruppenthal has served as a producer/co-producer for the NBC-TV series Quantum Leap, as co-executive producer of The Outer Limits and Silk Stalkings (which he also wrote scripts for) TV series, also as supervising producer of ABC-TV's Lois & Clark: The New Adventures of Superman (of also he wrote episodes for), CBS-TV's Touched by an Angel, Harts of the West and Covington Cross; and has writing credits for Blade: The Series, Avalon: Beyond the Abyss, NBC's The Pretender, FOX-TV's The X-Files, CBS-TV's Touched by an Angel, Harts of the West, The Adventures of Brisco County, Jr., Covington Cross, ABC-TV's Moonlighting, Sledge Hammer! and Max Headroom.

== Personal life ==
Ruppenthal currently resides in Baltimore, where he continues to write for television and Works for LAUSD at Berendo Middle Schoolin (the Pico-Union District) and the UCLA Extension School.

== Filmography ==
Year	Show/Credit	Role	Notes/Episodes
1987	Sledge Hammer!	Writer, Story/Teleplay	4 episodes
1988	Max Headroom	Writer	1 episode, "Baby Grobags"
1989	Moonlighting	Writer, Teleplay	3 episodes
1989-1990	Quantum Leap	Writer, Co-producer, Director	64 as producer 10 as writer
1992	Covington Cross	Writer, Supervising Producer	3 as writer 13 as producer
1993	Harts of the West	Writer, Supervising Producer	1 episode as producer, 2 as writer
1993	The Adventures of Brisco County, Jr.	Writer	1 episode, "Socrates' Sister"
1994	The X-Files	Writer	2 episodes
1994	Touched By An Angel	Writer, Supervising Producer	11 episodes as producer 2 episodes as writer
1995-1996	Lois & Clark: The New Adventures of Superman	Writer, producer	6 episodes as writer 22 episodes as producer
1996-1997	Silk Stalkings	Writer, Co-Executive producer	6 episodes
1997	The Pretender	Writer, Teleplay	2 episodes
1998-2000	The Outer Limits	Writer, co-executive producer, Supervising Producer	7 episodes
1999	Avalon: Beyond the Abyss	Writer	TV movie
2006	Blade: The Series	Writer	1 episode, "Sacrifice"
