= Time to Time =

Musical composition by Tania León

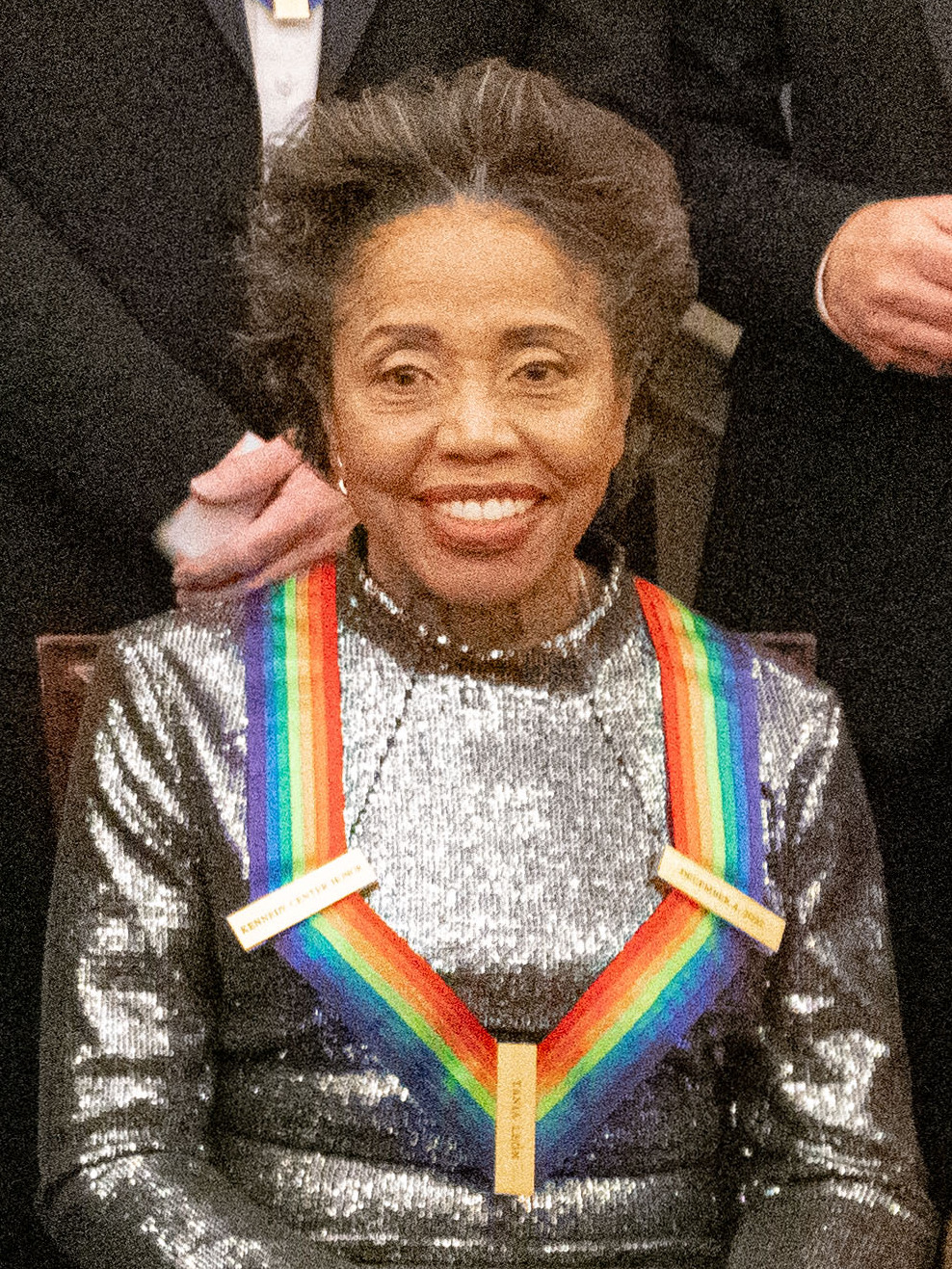
Tania León in 2022

Time to Time is a symphonic poem written in 2025 by the Cuban-American composer Tania León. The work was co-commissioned by the Boston Symphony Orchestra and the Leipzig Gewandhaus Orchestra. Its world premiere was performed by the Boston Symphony Orchestra conducted by Dima Slobodeniouk at Symphony Hall, Boston, on November 14, 2025.

== Background ==
Time to Time is cast in a single movement and has a duration of about 20 minutes. In the score program note, León is quoted saying, "The concept of time, occasionally focusing from one event to another, moving forward, now and then... that was for me a source of inspiration." The work's title comes from a haiku by the 17th-century Japanese poet Matsuo Bashō, which reads:

From time to time
The clouds give rest
To the moon's beholders

== Instrumentation ==
The work is scored for a medium orchestra consisting of two flutes (2nd doubling piccolo), two oboes (2nd doubling English horn), two clarinets (2nd doubling bass clarinet), two bassoons (2nd doubling contrabassoon), four horns, three trumpets in B-flat, two trombones, tuba, timpani, three percussionists, harp, piano, and strings.

== Reception ==
Reviewing the world premiere, A.Z. Madonna of The Boston Globe wrote, "The introduction evoked a sense of solemn ritual welcome, as the strings descended in a silvery haze before a solo clarinet introduced a leaping melodic gesture with avian agility. The specific Basho poem that inspired Time to Time describes observing the moon, but listening to the actual piece felt more like stargazing during a meteor shower. One must resolve to take in the whole experience, whether meteors appear or not. There weren't many meteoric moments during the piece, but the stars shone brightly." Julie Ingelfinger of The Boston Music Intelligencer praised the piece, writing, "The single-movement composition enchants and enlarges audience listening with its imaginative employment of an expanse of percussion instruments. For some moments of this 20-minute sojourn, the audience seemed mesmerized as if during the onset, peak and resolution of a lunar eclipse." of The Arts Fuse similarly opined, "The piece is a striking collage of sounds in which the full orchestra, with a huge percussion array, still spoke like a chamber ensemble, with bursts of solo and ensemble music framing a tonal center that came and went like moonlight occasionally obscured by the shifting of clouds."

Luke Kim of The Tech was more critical of the piece, however, remarking, "While the piece featured many interesting ideas, it felt unnecessarily prolonged at times, and its emphasis on texture over melody left some listeners without a clear thematic anchor. The result came across as almost an atmospheric tableau — highly evocative, if perhaps more scene-setting than structurally self-contained."
