= Dean Harens =

American actor (1920–1996)

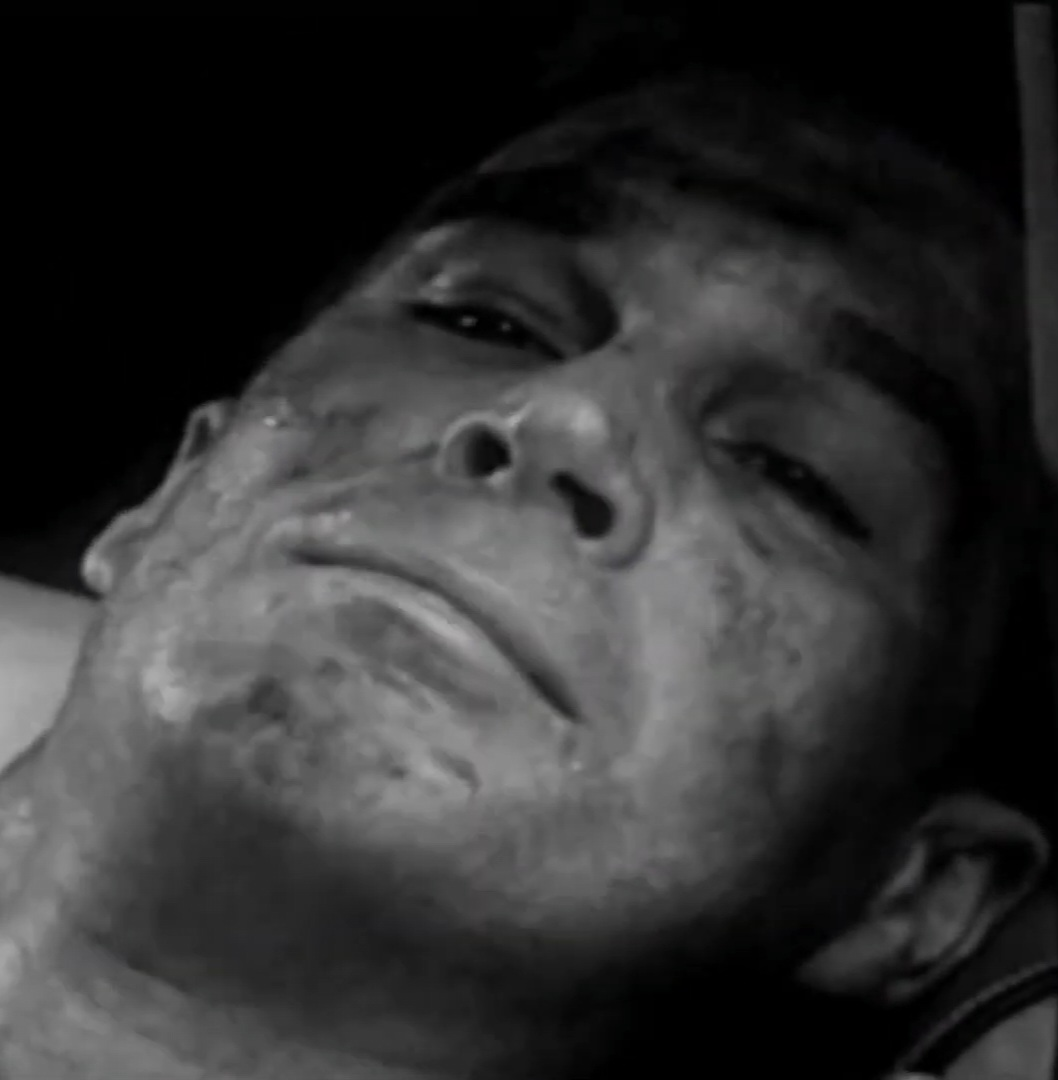
- Harens in an episode of Lock-Up (1960)
- Born: Dean Arthur Harens; June 30, 1920
- Died: May 20, 1996 (aged 75); Van Nuys, California, U.S.
- Resting place: San Fernando Mission Cemetery
- Occupation: Actor
- Years active: 1941–1977
- Spouse: June Dayton (m. 1947; died 1994)

Dean Arthur Harens (June 30, 1920 – May 20, 1996) was an American actor. He appeared in movies, plays and many TV programs over four decades.

== Early years ==
Harens was a protege of actress Alison Skipworth, who discovered him when he was acting in Michigan.

== Career ==
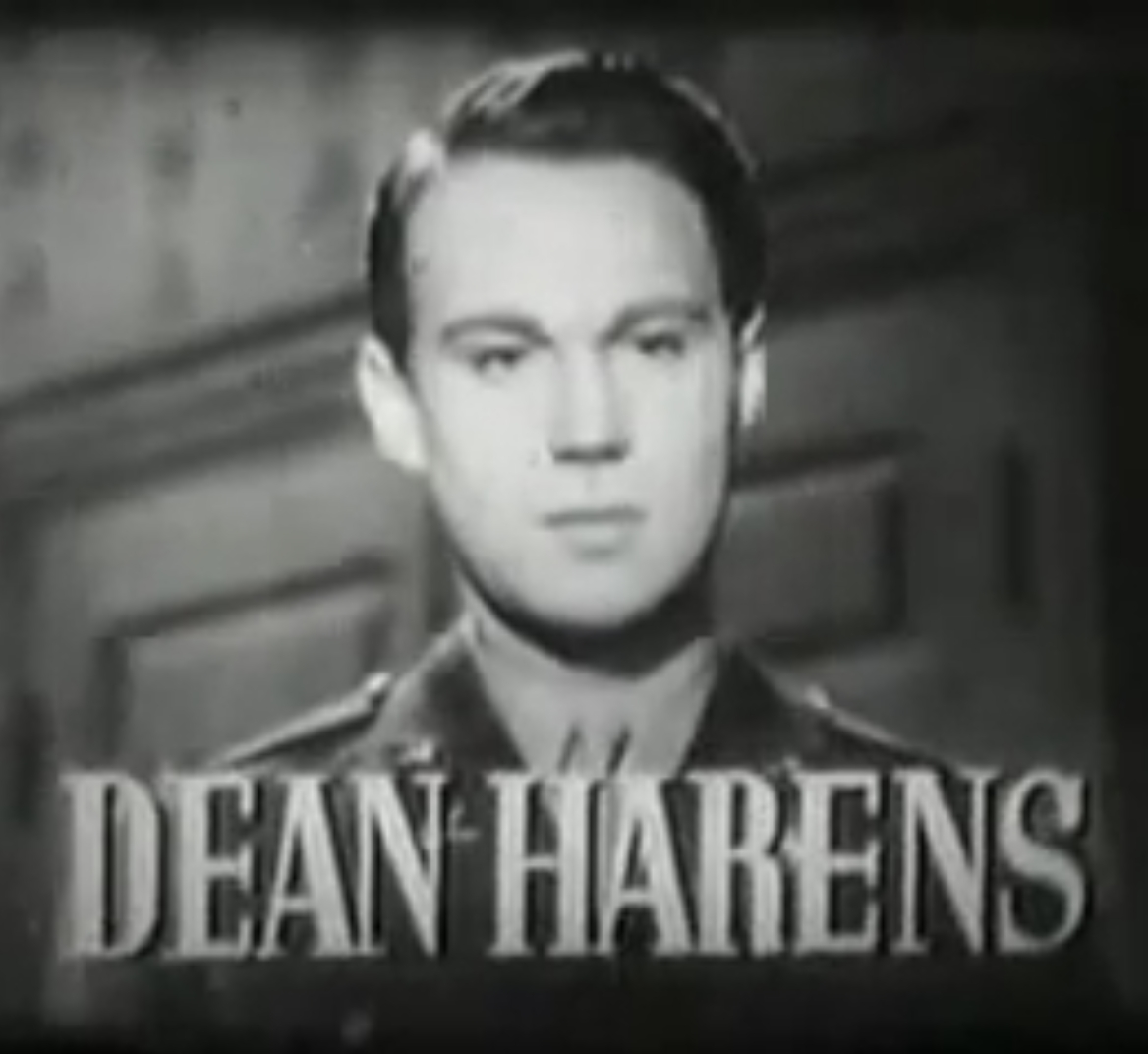
Trailer for Christmas Holiday (1944)

Harens acted summer stock before debuting on Broadway in The Talley Method in 1941. His first film appearance came at the age of 24, in 1944's Christmas Holiday. He appeared in seven movies throughout his career, although never in a starring role. He was a cast member on three TV series, and played a recurring character on the ABC series The F.B.I.. He also made five guest appearances on Perry Mason, including the role of murderer Frank Fettridge in the 1959 episode, "The Case of the Calendar Girl," the 1959 episode of “The Case of Paul Drake’s Dilemma” as the brother-in-law of the victim, the 1960 in the role of double murderer Riley Morgan in "The Case of the Wandering Widow, " and in 1965 as Daniel Buckley in "The Case of the Fatal Fortune." Harens also guest starred twice in the western TV series Bonanza: he played Jim Poole in the 1965 episode "Jonah" and he portrayed rancher Morgan Tanner in the 1966 episode "Credit for a Kill".

Harens's wife, actress June Dayton, whom he met while acting on Broadway in 1947, died in 1994 at the age of 70.

== Death ==
Harens died in Van Nuys, in the San Fernando Valley of Los Angeles, California, at the age of 75. He was interred in San Fernando Mission Cemetery in San Fernando, California.

== Filmography ==
Year	Title	Role	Notes
1944	Christmas Holiday	Lt. Charles Mason	
1944	The Suspect	John Marshall	
1946	Crack-Up	Reynolds	
1959	Black Saddle	Tom Brandon	Ep.Change of Venue
1964	The Outer Limits	Medicine	Episode: "Cold Hands, Warm Heart" with William Shatner
1967	The Invaders	Dr. MacLeuen	
1967	Rosie!	Willetts	
1969	D.A.: Murder One	Judge Skinner	TV movie
1969	Topaz	State Department Official #3	Uncredited
1970	Double Jeopardy	Thomas Howard	TV movie
1971	Paper Man	Bureaucrat	TV movie
1972	Mission: Impossible	Larkin	TV Episode: "Committed"
