= Behold, Eck! =

- The Outer Limits episode
- Episode no.: Season 2 Episode 3
- Directed by: Byron Haskin
- Story by: William R. Cox
- Teleplay by: John Mantley
- Cinematography by: Kenneth Peach
- Production code: 37
- Original air date: October 3, 1964

Guest appearances
- Peter Lind Hayes; Joan Freeman; Parley Baer

Episode chronology
← Previous "Cold Hands, Warm Heart"	Next → "Expanding Human"

"Behold, Eck!" is an episode of the original The Outer Limits television show. It first aired on October 3, 1964, during the second season.

== Introduction ==
A creature called Eck who lives in a two-dimensional world finds himself transported to our three-dimensional world and seeks to return home with the help of special glasses made by an eccentric optical engineer. There is a romantic subplot, as the engineer realizes that his secretary has romantic feelings for him, and that he returns that interest.

== Opening narration ==
"Since the first living thing gazed upward through the darkness, Man has seldom been content merely to be born, to endure, and to die. With a curious fervor he has struggled to unlock the mysteries of creation and of the world in which he lives. Sometimes he has won. Sometimes he has lost. And sometimes, in the tumbling torrents of space and time, he has brief glimpses of a world he never even dreams..."

== Plot ==
James Stone, an absent-minded optic engineer, is brilliant but unappreciated. His brother, a government physicist, has shut Stone out of his life. Stone's secretary, Elizabeth Dunn, is in love with him and has read all of his recondite scientific papers, but Stone is oblivious to her personal feelings.

The story begins as policemen investigate the destruction of Stone's office, the latest in a series of attacks on optometric facilities. After they leave, Stone realizes that his own glasses are broken and tries a pair of prescription lenses made from meteoric quartz. He recoils in horror as he sees a creature that appears to be made of energy. The creature attacks him, smashing his glasses, steals a page from Stone's notebook on which are written the names of patients who have been prescribed the lenses, and vanishes.

Stone theorizes that the creature must exist in only two dimensions, as when he turns sideways he becomes invisible, and is able to move through walls. Stone visits his physicist brother to discuss this, but his brother dismisses him as mad. Stone has his secretary order several new pairs of the meteoric eyepieces. Of the patients sought by the two-dimensional creature, one has been injured, another is found dead, and the third, a welder, managed to ward off the creature with his welding torch (later Stone is told by the creature that in the second dimension, fire is all-powerful because two-dimensional organisms, like dry leaves or paper, are easily set aflame). A large building has been cut in half. Stone's brother and the police begin to investigate these occurrences. Meanwhile, Stone notices the love-struck Dunn for the first time, remarking after putting on a different pair of glasses that something about her "looks different," as she glows with adoration towards him.

The creature appears again to Stone after he puts on a pair of the meteoric glasses. The creature, called Eck, explains that he was trapped in our dimensional plane when he fell through an experimental portal. He needs to return to the second dimension through the rift and close it, or else the rift could cause all kinds of things from his dimension to spill through. Eck is unable to see properly in three-dimensional space, and requires lenses to correct his two-dimensional vision so that he can find the rift. Eck gives Stone one of his eyes, a translucent triangle shaped object, though he asserts that a lens must be constructed in 24 hours, or he will starve to death, since he cannot assimilate three-dimensional nutrients. Stone begins to grind the interdimensional lens. Meanwhile, Eck watches a TV broadcast about himself. Thinking the broadcaster is also two-dimensional, he jumps into the TV set to seek help. This causes him to become luminous, and thereafter can be seen without the special glasses.

The now-visible Eck wreaks more havoc in the city, then returns to Stone's office. The police and Stone's brother find that Stone is harboring the creature, and break into his office with a flamethrower. They attack Eck with fire, and apparently kill him. After they leave, Stone and Dunn find Eck alive, having deceived his attackers. They produce the interdimensional lens, which Eck tries to take with him through a wall but cannot as the lens is three-dimensional. Stone and Dunn offer to bring the lens with them to the public square, where the rift is located. Eck exits through the wall, Stone asks Elizabeth if she would like to go to the square to "say goodbye to a friend," and the two exit as a couple, Stone's arm still around Dunn's waist.

== Closing narration ==
"Paradoxically, Man's endless search for knowledge has often plundered his courage and warped his vision, so that he has faced the unknown with terror rather than awe, and probed the darkness with a scream rather than a light. Yet there have always been men who have touched the texture of tomorrow with understanding and courage. Through these men, we may yet touch the stars."

== Background ==
The idea of a two dimensional world was lifted from the 1884 novella Flatland: A Romance of Many Dimensions by Edwin Abbott. Writer William Cox wove a lighthearted comedy treatment around the two dimensional concept called "The Reluctant Monster" (this had no relation to Flatland other than the idea of a 2-D world). It was then passed to John Mantley, later the producer of western TV series Gunsmoke, to write the final teleplay.

== Cast ==
- Peter Lind Hayes – as Dr. James Stone
- Joan Freeman – as Elizabeth Dunn
- Parley Baer – as Dr. Bernard Stone
- Douglas Henderson – as Det. Lt. Runyon
- Sammy Reese – as George Wilkerson
- Marcel Hebert – as Miss Willet
- Paul Sorenson – as Grayson
- Richard Gittings – as TV Newscaster
- Jack Wilson – as Sgt. Jackson
- Lou Elias – as Eck
- Taggart Casey – as Rogers
- Robert Johnson – as Voice of Eck
