= Quell and Co. =

1982 film directed by William Witney

- Directed by: William Witney
- Written by: Luke Hammer
- Produced by: Felipe Mier Miranda
- Starring: Madison Mason; Skip Homeier; Cherie Lunghi; Rockne Tarkington; Petrus Antonius
- Cinematography: Gabriel Torres
- Release date: 1982
- Running time: 90 minutes
- Countries: United States; West Germany; Mexico
- Language: English

Quell and Co is a 1982 film directed by William Witney. It was Witney's last film credit. It is also known as Showdown at Eagle Gap. The film was a West German-American production filmed in Durango, Mexico. Witney appears in a cameo as the local sheriff (listed in the credits as W.B. Witney).

The film stars: Madison Mason, Skip Homeier, Cherie Lunghi, Rockne Tarkington and Petrus Antonius. It was Homeier's last film.
