= Cold Hands, Warm Heart =

- The Outer Limits episode
- Episode no.: Season 2 Episode 2
- Directed by: Charles Haas
- Written by: Dan Ullman
- Cinematography by: Kenneth Peach
- Production code: 33
- Original air date: September 26, 1964

Guest appearances
- William Shatner; Geraldine Brooks; Lloyd Gough; Malachi Throne; Dean Harens

Episode chronology
← Previous "Soldier"	Next → "Behold, Eck!"

"Cold Hands, Warm Heart" is an episode of the original The Outer Limits television show. It first aired on September 26, 1964, during the second season. The episode features William Shatner in the lead role as a space explorer, not long before he was cast as Captain Kirk in Star Trek. Shatner's Outer Limits character is involved in a mission called "Project Vulcan". During the opening scene, Shatner is shown parking his car and walking into a building at Space Park, right past a reflecting pool where he and other Star Trek crew members beamed down in a 1967 first-season episode, Operation -- Annihilate!.

The episode was a Star Trek "preunion", as three of the co-stars would later have guest roles in television or film episodes of the series. Malachi Throne portrayed Commodore Mendez in the episode "The Menagerie". Lawrence Montaigne portrayed the Romulan Decius in the episode "Balance of Terror" and the Vulcan Stonn in the episode "Amok Time". Montaigne was also considered for the original role of Spock on that series. James Sikking would later appear as Captain Styles in the film Star Trek III: The Search for Spock (1984).

== Opening narration ==
"The most brilliant planet in our solar system is Venus, named for the Goddess of Love. It is closer to Earth than any other planet –twenty-eight million miles away. Until sometime in the last half of the twentieth century it is still a planet shrouded in mystery, enveloped in a heavy blanket of clouds and steam. Because its surface temperature was believed to be several times that of Earth's, it was not thought possible for Man to reach Venus and come back... until one day, somebody did it."

== Plot ==
Astronaut Jeff Barton returns to Earth after completing the first crewed mission to orbit Venus, a test flight connected with Project Vulcan, a planned program for the exploration and colonization of Mars. Barton is promoted to brigadier general and prepares to testify before an appropriations committee whose support is needed to continue the project. Mission personnel question him about an eight-minute period during the Venus flight when radio contact was lost, but Barton cannot explain what happened.

Soon after his return, Barton develops an extreme sensitivity to cold. He keeps rooms unusually warm, drinks nearly scalding coffee, and seeks relief in a steam room heated to dangerous temperatures. He also suffers recurring nightmares about the Venus mission. During one such episode, he remembers descending into the planet's atmosphere during the communications blackout and seeing a strange, plant-like creature outside his spacecraft. His condition continues to deteriorate, and his fingers begin to develop webbing. His physician, Mike, discovers that Barton's body chemistry is changing and eventually finds that his blood no longer corresponds to any known blood type.

Barton initially conceals his condition because he fears that it will jeopardize Project Vulcan. As the changes worsen, he becomes increasingly desperate for heat, at one point failing to notice that a blanket around him has caught fire. He later forces his way onto the military base, where he is restrained and sedated. Questioned about the missing portion of the Venus flight, Barton recalls the creature looking through his spacecraft window and says that it somehow entered him.

Mike observes that Barton's condition temporarily improved after his exposure to extreme heat and proposes a full blood transfusion followed by sedation and heat treatment. Barton is placed in an environmental test chamber while his wife, Ann, speaks to him continuously to keep him conscious and focused. As the temperature rises, Barton again sees the Venusian creature and becomes agitated, but Ann continues talking to him until he eventually loses consciousness. When he awakens, he is lucid and asks for coffee.

Barton recovers sufficiently to appear before the appropriations committee. He conceals his mutated hands with gloves and explains their condition by claiming that he spilled hot soup on them. After the hearing, he reports that the committee will provide the requested funding for Project Vulcan. Ann then notices that Barton is perspiring for the first time since his return from Venus. Barton realizes that he now feels warm, and his doctors take this as a sign that his body is beginning to recover.

== Closing narration ==
"The eternal, never-ceasing search for knowledge often leads to dark and dangerous places. Sometimes it demands risks not only of those who are searching, but of others who love them. These, in their own special way, know that knowledge is never wasted, nor is love."

== Cast ==
- William Shatner – as Brig. Gen. Jeff Barton
- Geraldine Brooks – as Ann Barton
- Malachi Throne – as Mike
- Lloyd Gough – as Matt Claiborne
- Dean Harens – as medical technician
- James Sikking – as botany specialist
- Lawrence Montaigne – as construction worker
- Henry Scott – as electronics technician
- Julian N. Burton – as reporter #1
- Peter Madsen – as reporter #2
- Lou Elias – as guard
- Hugh Jensen – as chief
- Tim Huntley – as chairman
- Patrick Riley – as attendant #1
- Ray Kellogg – as attendant #2
