= Crack-Up (1946 film) =

1946 film by Irving Reis

- Theatrical release poster
- Directed by: Irving Reis
- Screenplay by: John Paxton; Ben Bengal; Ray Spencer
- Based on: "Madman's Holiday" by Fredric Brown
- Produced by: Jack J. Gross
- Starring: Pat O'Brien; Claire Trevor; Herbert Marshall; Ray Collins; Wallace Ford; Dean Harens
- Cinematography: Robert De Grasse
- Edited by: Frederic Knudtson
- Music by: Leigh Harline
- Production company: RKO Pictures
- Distributed by: RKO Pictures
- Release date: September 6, 1946
- Running time: 93 minutes
- Country: United States
- Language: English

Crack-Up is a 1946 American film noir starring Pat O'Brien, Claire Trevor and Herbert Marshall. It was directed by Irving Reis, who had directed many films of The Falcon franchise in the early 1940s. The drama is based on "Madman's Holiday", a 1943 short story written by mystery writer Fredric Brown featured in Detective Story Magazine.

== Plot ==
Running berserk, art critic and lecturer George Steele violently forces entry into the Manhattan Museum of Art. Apprehended by a patrolman, Steele claims that he was involved in a train wreck. Police lieutenant Cochrane finds no record of any recent accidents. Steele, unsure what happened, relates the bizarre events that he has experienced.

Steele's recollection begins with his enthusiastically received lecture on art, after which he was reprimanded by museum director Barton over his sensational style and denied access to X-ray equipment to demonstrate a forged painting, Albrecht Dürer's Adoration of the Magi. Afterward, while having a drink with his girlfriend, magazine writer Terry Cordell, Steele received an urgent telephone call informing him that his mother had been taken to a hospital. He rushed to Grand Central Station and caught the last train. About 40 minutes later, he watched helplessly as another train crashed into his. Hearing Steele's claims, Cochrane reveals that Steele's mother is fine and had never been taken to the hospital and that there have been no recent train wrecks.

Eager to avoid a scandal, Barton pleads with Cochrane not to arrest Steele. Stevenson, the curator and Steele's friend, and Dr. Lowell, a member of the museum's board of directors, vouch for his character. In private, Traybin, a British art expert who, like Steele, is an expert authenticator of stolen artwork, tells Cochrane that he wants Steele freed but the police discreetly tail him. Steele is released but his contentious lectures are canceled by Barton at the direction of the museum board and he is suspended from work because of his unstable behavior.

Determined to exonerate himself, Steele attempts to reenact the train trip. He learns that a drunk had been absconded from the train by two men and believes that the drunk had been he. Steele informs Stevenson of his discovery and begins to suspect that a Thomas Gainsborough painting that had been loaned to the museum and lost in a fire at sea was actually a fake. Later, Stevenson informs Steele that the fire was not an accident and requests to meet him in the museum vault. When Steele arrives, he finds Stevenson dead. Seen standing over the body by a watchman, he flees. Although Traybin and Terry plead with Steele to surrender, Steele refuses.

Steele coerces Barton to meet him and confirms that the Gainsborough had indeed been a forgery and was destroyed to conceal the theft of the original. Steele follows Barton to a party given by a museum board member, where he learns that the shipment of the Dürer back to London has been unexpectedly advanced. He sneaks aboard the ship, finds the painting, and is able to cut it from its frame just before it could be consumed in a fire. Though locked in the cargo hold by the arsonist, he is able to escape when the ship's crew arrives, followed by Traybin and Cochrane. Steele secretly disembarks and is collected by Terry, who had driven Traybin to the pier, and is whisked away.

Steele persuades Barton's secretary Mary to arrange for him to X-ray the painting, which he confirms is a copy. As they are leaving, Steele is knocked unconscious and Mary brandishes a gun on Terry. Steele and Terry are taken to the estate of Dr. Lowell, who is behind the thefts. He explains to Terry that as a frustrated art lover he could never have acquired such fabulous works legitimately. Before killing his captives, Lowell uses narcosynthesis on Steele to confirm that Steele had not told the police of his discovery, the same drug that he had used to make Steele believe that he had been involved in a train wreck. Traybin and Cochrane appear just in time to save the pair, shooting Lowell dead. Traybin, an undercover Scotland Yard inspector, had all along been investigating the suspicious Gainsborough loss and seeking to ensure the safe return of the Dürer. Hoping to save herself from being charged as an accessory to the crimes, Mary shows Traybin where Lowell had hidden the stolen artworks.

== Cast ==
- Pat O'Brien as George Steele
- Claire Trevor as Terry Cordell
- Herbert Marshall as Traybin
- Ray Collins as Dr. Lowell
- Wallace Ford as Lt. Cochrane
- Dean Harens as Reynolds
- Damian O'Flynn as Stevenson
- Erskine Sanford as Barton
- Mary Ware as Mary

== Reception ==
Bosley Crowther, film critic for The New York Times, panned the film, especially the screenplay and direction of the drama. He wrote, "Since Pat O'Brien's noggin suffers a blow which blacks out his memory as the story starts, there probably wouldn't be much sense taking the authors to task for the fantastic events which ensue ... This explosive and promising action sets in motion a chain of circumstances which, no doubt, must have baffled the script writers, too, for they never do give it a logical explanation ... All of the aforementioned principals turn in competent performances, and the mystery is how they managed to get through the picture without becoming hopelessly confused. They certainly were one up on us there. Played at breakneck pace, Crack-Up might have succeeded in covering up its confusion through sheer physical action, but Irving Reis elected to direct in waltz tempo. This gives one time to think about the curious motivation, and when you start thinking about a picture such as Crack-Up you are overwhelmed by its inadequacies."

In 2002, critic Dennis Schwartz wrote for Ozus Reviews, "The film takes a populist stand by promoting 'art for the masses' and takes a negative view of the art elitists (art critics and collectors) who favor such art styles as surrealism. That kind of art is considered subversive by George and is not as tame as is the classical style of Gainsborough. The art lesson didn't register, but as a thriller Crack-Up was right on track. The shadowy photography by Robert de Grasse was done in stylish chiaroscuro shadings, giving the film an uncanny feel. O'Brien was convincing as the pig-headed unconscious American who has modern technology work for him and against him, as the inventions from the war are now shared by both criminals and scientists."

In 2008 Time Out Film Guide called the film a "[m]arginally intriguing [film] for its view of art (pro-populist, anti-élitist stuff like surrealism), it's made as a thriller by the excellent supporting cast and fine, noir-ish camerawork from Robert de Grasse. The film has been shown on the Turner Classic Movies series Noir Alley with Eddie Muller.
