= Ruben F. Mettler =

American businessman

- Born: February 23, 1924; Shafter, California
- Died: May 23, 2006 (aged 82)
- Occupations: Chairman & CEO at TRW Inc.

Ruben F. Mettler (1924–2006) was an American businessman. He served as chairman and chief executive officer of TRW Inc. from 1977 to 1988.

== Biography ==
=== Early life ===
Ruben Mettler was born in Shafter, California on February 23, 1924. He attended Stanford University on a Gamble Scholarship and transferred to the California Institute of Technology, where he received a Bachelor of Science in electrical engineering in 1944. He served in the Second World War. Back at Caltech, he received a master's degree in 1947 and a PhD in 1949. He played American football for Caltech.

=== Career ===
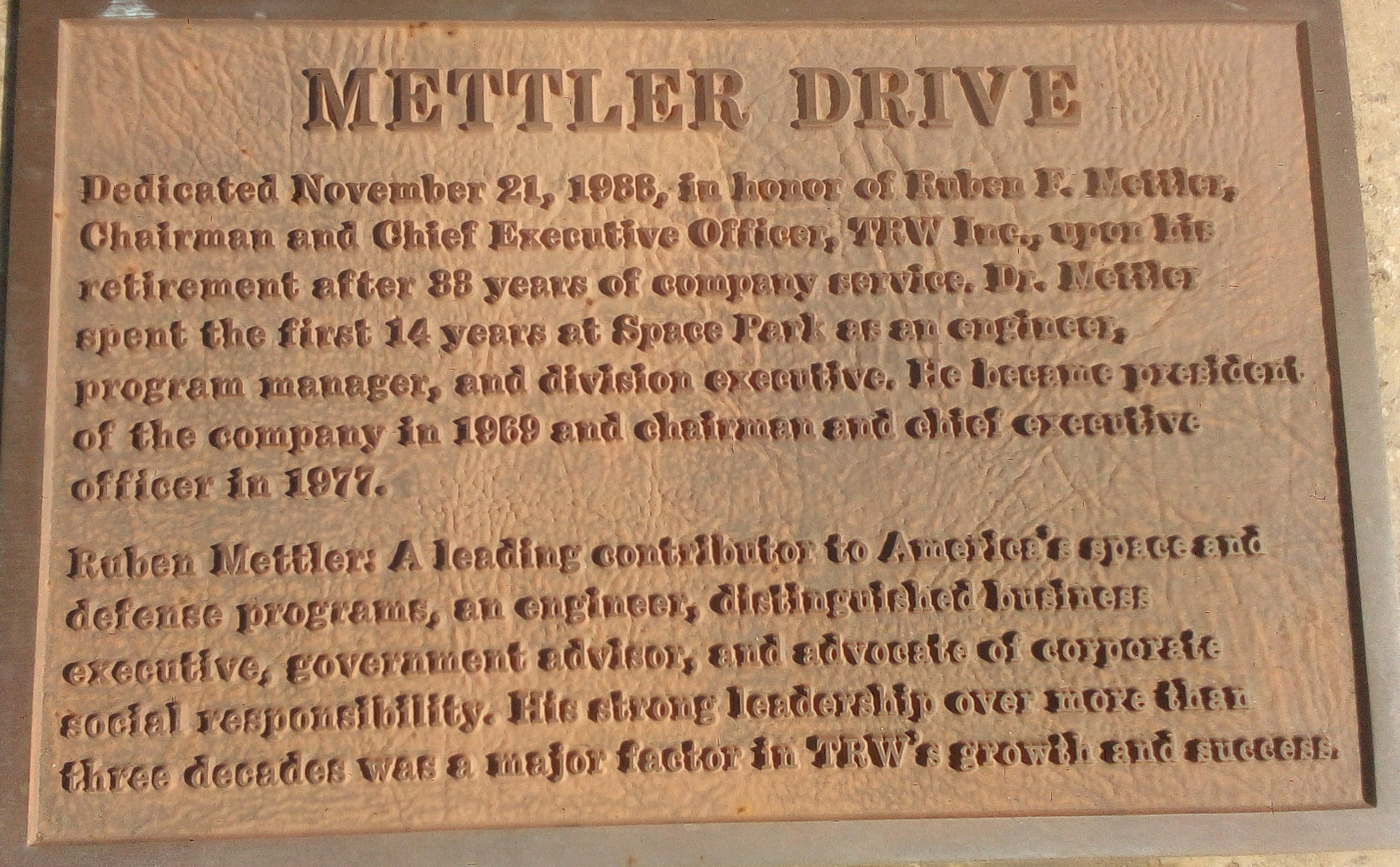
Plaque for the Nov. 21, 1988 dedication of a driveway in Mettler's honor.

He started his career at Hughes Aircraft. He served as special assistant to the Assistant Secretary of Defense in the Eisenhower administration. He worked for the Ramo-Wooldridge Corporation, later known as TRW Inc., where he served as president and chief operating officer from 1969 to 1977, and as chairman and CEO from 1977 to 1988. He served on its board of directors from 1964 to 1994, and a driveway on TRW's Space Park campus was named in his honor. He worked on the SM-65 Atlas, SM-68 Titan, LGM-30 Minuteman and PGM-17 Thor nuclear missile programs for the United States Air Force and NASA, and the Orbiting Geophysical Observatory.

He sat on the boards of directors of Bank of America, Merck & Co., the Goodyear Tire and Rubber Company and Bechtel. He served as chairman of the Business Roundtable from 1982 to 1984, and as chairman of The Business Council from 1985 to 1986.

=== Philanthropy ===
In 1977, he was appointed by President Jimmy Carter to develop a program to promote the hiring of Vietnam veterans. He served as chairman of the United Negro College Fund. He received the Nation's Most Outstanding Electrical Engineer Award from Eta Kappa Nu in 1954, One of Ten Outstanding Young Men of America Award from the U.S. Junior Chamber of Commerce in 1955, the Meritorious Civilian Service Award from the United States Department of Defense in 1969, the National Relations Award from the National Conference of Christians and Jews in 1979, the Roy Wilkins Memorial Award from the L.A. Chapter of the NAACP in 1981, and the Golden Plate Award of the American Academy of Achievement in 1986. He was a member of the board of trustees of Caltech from 1968 to his death, and served as chairman from 1985 to 1993. He was also a life member of the Caltech Associates, the President's Circle, and the Caltech Alumni Association. The Ruben and Donna Mettler Professorship at Caltech is named for him.

=== Personal life ===
He was married to Donna Jeane Smith and resided in Los Angeles. They had two sons: Matthew Frederick Mettler, an engineer at TRW Inc., and Daniel Frederick Mettler, who lives at the Jay Nolan Center in Canyon Country, California for autism. He died on Tuesday, May 23, 2006.
