= Beachhead (film) =

1954 film by Stuart Heisler

- 1954 theatrical poster for Beachead!
- Directed by: Stuart Heisler
- Written by: Richard Alan Simmons
- Based on: I've Got Mine by Richard G. Hubler
- Produced by: Howard W. Koch; Aubrey Schenck
- Starring: Tony Curtis; Frank Lovejoy; Mary Murphy; Skip Homeier
- Cinematography: Gordon Avil
- Edited by: John F. Schreyer
- Music by: Arthur Lange; Emil Newman
- Production company: Aubrey Schenck Productions
- Distributed by: United Artists
- Release date: 5 February 1954
- Running time: 90 minutes
- Country: United States
- Language: English
- Budget: US$450,000
- Box office: US$1,400,000

Beachhead! is a 1954 American Technicolor war film based on U.S. Marine Corps Captain Richard G. Hubler 1945 novel I've Got Mine about World War II. It was filmed on Kauai island in the Hawaiian Islands by Aubrey Schenck Productions, released through United Artists studio and directed by Stuart Heisler.

== Plot ==
In late October 1943, a battalion of U.S. Marines have landed on Choiseul Island to create a diversion for the impending Allied attack and invasion of Japanese held Bougainville Island in the Northern Solomon Islands, northeast of the large island colony of New Guinea in the southwest Pacific Ocean.

Four of them have been selected to carry out a reconnaissance patrol to find a French planter. The planter has sent a solitary radio message to the Allies concerning the area the Japanese have mined; if the information is true it could save a projected 18% of the Marine invasion force. The patrol must confirm that the message is authentic, and that the planter is still alive, as he can give the Marines valuable information needed for a successful amphibious landing by the Allied forces. Once obtaining the information the small party is to make a rendezvous on the coast with a US Navy PT boat. The members of a patrol are the sole survivors of their sergeant's platoon on Guadalcanal with both the patrol members and the sergeant blaming their demise on their sergeant's leadership.

== Cast ==
- Tony Curtis as Burke
- Frank Lovejoy as Sgt. Fletcher
- Mary Murphy as Nina Bouchard
- Eduard Franz as Bouchard, French Planter
- Skip Homeier as Reynolds
- John Doucette as Maj. Scott
- Alan Wells as Biggerman
- Akira Fukunaga as Terrified Japanese Sailor (as Sunshine Akira Fukunaga)
- Dan Aoki as Japanese Sniper
- Sam "Steamboat" Mokuahi Sr. as Malanesian, Island native

== Production ==
Filmed on Hawaiian locations on Kauaʻi, including Hanalei Pier, the film was budgeted at US$450,000 with the producers arranging to release Tony Curtis from his contract with Universal-International studios. Many of the roles in the film were filled by Hawaiians such as Sam "Steamboat" Mokuahi, Democratic Party organiser Dan Aoki, and Akira Fukunaga, the latter two being veterans of the 442nd Regimental Combat Team.

The producers went to the US Marine Corps to seek technical assistance for the making of the film. Although the Corps liked the idea of the film, they refused to provide cooperation. As two of the four Marines were killed in the screenplay, the Public Information Officer said that the Marines would not provide any assistance to any film showing the Corps taking 50 per cent casualties as they were in the midst of a new recruiting campaign emphasising a new less danger-seeking image. The producers visited the Pentagon and were provided with Navy, Coast Guard, and Hawaiian National Guard assistance in making the movie. The film was titled Missione Suicidio (Suicide Mission) in Italy.

Mary Murphy felt that Stuart Heisler was trying to make her look like a version of the director's own wife. She was also nearly attacked by a drunken cameraman on the film's isolated Hawaiian location.
