= Richard G. Hubler =

American screenwriter

- Born: August 20, 1912; Dunmore, Pennsylvania, U.S.
- Died: October 21, 1981 (aged 69); Ojai, California, U.S.

Richard G. Hubler (born Richard Gibson Hubler; 20 August 1912 in Dunmore, Pennsylvania – 21 October 1981 in Ojai, California), was an American screenwriter; military author; and writer of biographies, fiction, and non-fiction. However, his best-known work is the 1965 autobiography that he ghostwrote for Ronald Reagan, Where's the Rest of Me?.

== Biography ==
Hubler attended Wyoming Seminary and graduated from Swarthmore College in 1934. Hubler began writing for many magazines. In 1941, he wrote his first biography Lou Gehrig: The Iron Horse of Baseball followed by I Flew for China in 1942, a biography of Chiang Kai-shek's personal pilot.

He enlisted in the United States Marine Corps and was commissioned as a second lieutenant in December 1942. He served for three years in the Corps and obtained the rank of captain. He wrote many articles for the Marine Corps Gazette, one of which criticized the American military's awarding of decorations Winning Medals and Alienating People. Hubler also published a World War II history of marine viation, Flying Leathernecks: The Complete History of Marine Corps Aviation 1941–1944, in 1944.

After the war, Hubler used his Marine experience as inspiration for his first novel published in 1946, I've Got Mine, which was filmed as Beachhead in 1954 and was republished as Walk Into Hell in 1963. Hubler became a Hollywood Scriptwriter with a screenplay based on Jim Corbett's Man-Eaters of Kumaon. That led him to be signed as a scriptwriter for Belsam Productions to write a trio of films for Tom Conway.

In addition to Reagan's autobiography, he also wrote SAC: The Strategic Air Command (1958), St. Louis Woman with Helen Traubel (1959), Big Eight: A Biography of an Airplane (1960) Straight Up: The Story of Vertical Flight (1961) and The Cole Porter Story as told to Richard G. Hubler (1965).

In February 1954, he had the piece Dogs Are Dumb published in Coronet magazine, relating the lack of intelligence in dogs. He quickly became deluged by irate dog-owners' correspondence and can be heard making an apologetic appearance on the 19 May 1954 edition of You Bet Your Life that defended his opinion and stated that he owned a dog himself.

Hubler was commissioned by Walt Disney Productions and the Disney family to prepare a biography of Walt Disney shortly after Disney's death, which he researched and wrote from 1967 to 1968. Upon submission, he was paid a contractual penalty, and the manuscript never saw print. "No comments, no reasons, no nothing at all", Hubler stated to animation historian Michael Barrier as to why it remained unpublished. Animation historian Wade Sampson notes when Bob Thomas some years later was engaged to write what became Walt Disney: An American Original, Disney executives explained that "two other writers had tried their hand at writing the official biography but both of the attempts had proven unsatisfactory."

A number of the interviews that Hubler conducted on Disney have been published in the book series Walt's People edited by Didier Ghez.

Hubler's papers are held by the Howard Gotlieb Archival Research Center at Boston University. This includes the manuscript of the unpublished Disney biography and much material from its preparation. Many of the interview transcripts are also held by the Disney Archives.

One of his nieces was the artist Marcia Sandmeyer Wilson.

He died of Parkinson's disease.
