= Space Park =

Aerospace engineering campus in California, United States

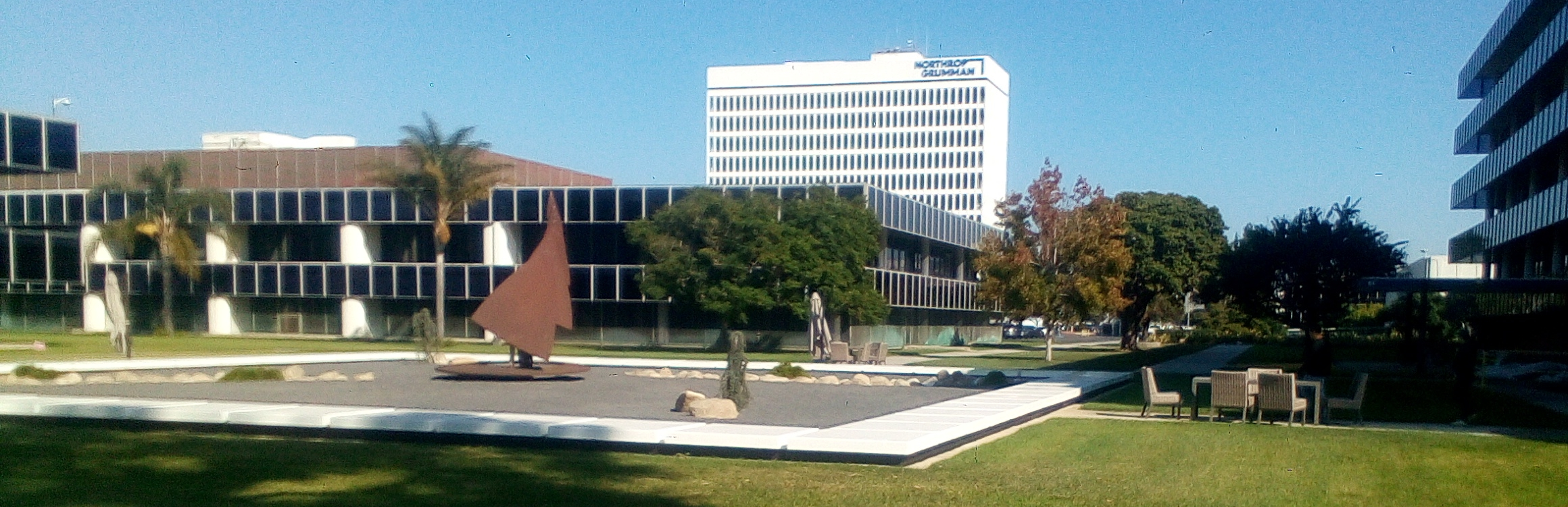
- View of historic quad-plaza where Robert F. Kennedy and Apollo 13 astronauts gave speeches, and William Shatner appeared in TV episodes of The Outer Limits and Star Trek.
- Interactive map of Space Park
- Coordinates: 33°53′29″N 118°22′28″W
- Opening date: November 1, 1961; 64 years ago
- Owner: Northrop Grumman
- No. of workers: >10,000

Space Park is an aerospace engineering campus occupying over 100 acres in Redondo Beach, California, since 1961, expanding in 1968 to a nearly adjacent 90 acres in Manhattan Beach (15 of which were developed as public sports facilities between 1987 and 2001; 22 of which were sold in 1996 and became the MBS Media Campus).

Founded as Space Technology Center by Space Technology Laboratories (STL), the site is now owned and operated by Northrop Grumman Corp. (NGC) since its 2002 acquisition of TRW Inc. This group of buildings became the first in the USA constructed solely for the entire process of designing, building, and testing spacecraft. The architects designed them so every engineer could have a desk with a window view of tree-scaped courtyards. During the 1960 groundbreaking ceremony, STL leaders joined in an ecumenical prayer for the space age: "We dedicate this building then to the protection of our land, to the discovery of our universe, but most of all to the spearheading of Peace on Earth and Good Will to Men."

== Prominent buildings ==
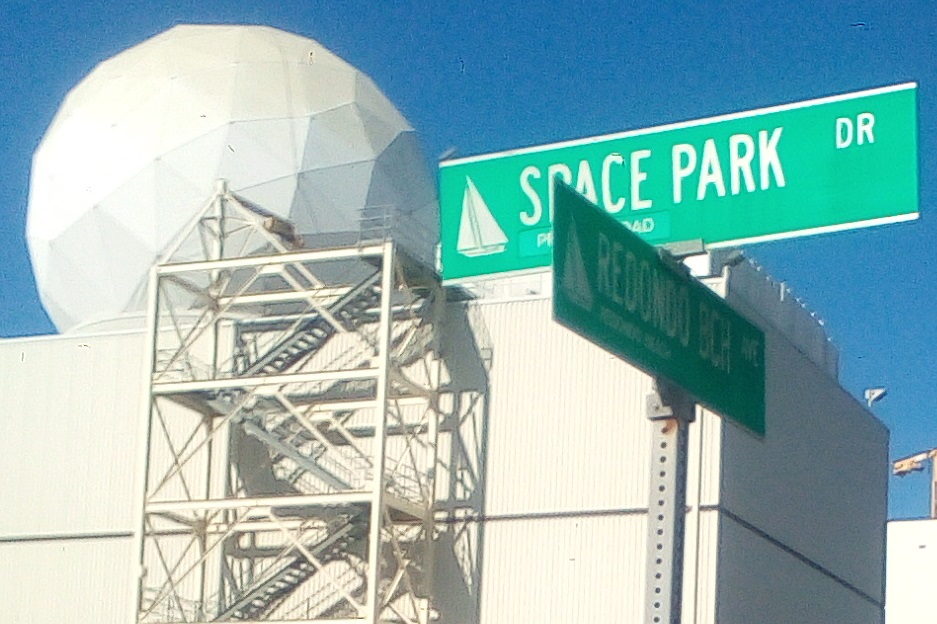
Radome atop M1 near NW corner of Space Park Drive and Redondo Bch Avenue

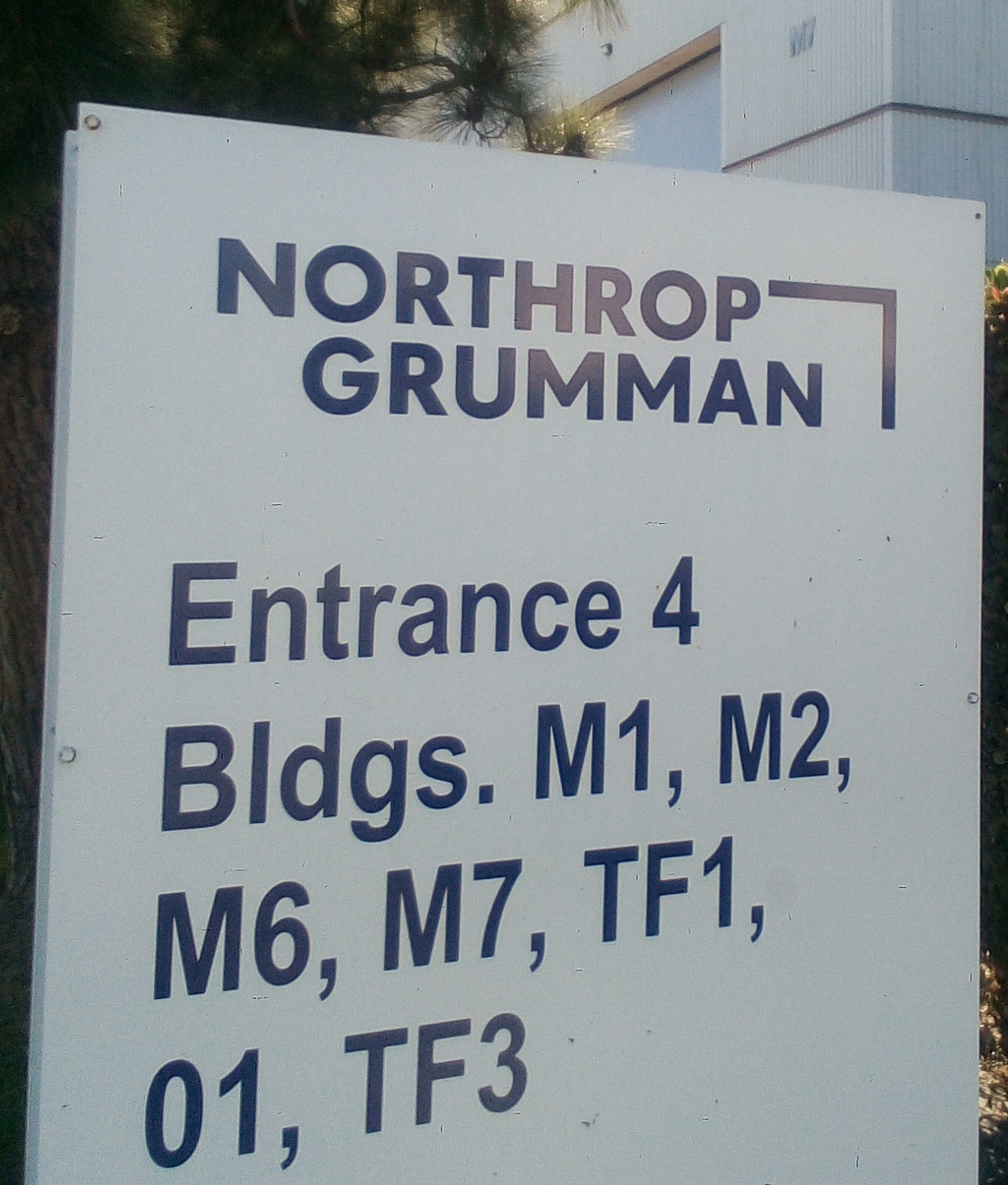
Sign in front of M7 at SW corner of Space Park Dr & Redondo Bch Ave.

This list includes buildings with prefixes to readily identify activities therein, shown in maps published for visitors:

D = Development: D1
E = Executive: E1 (originally Engineering), E2 (originally Administration)
M = Manufacturing: M1, (M1A defunct), M1E (east annex), M2, M2N (north annex), M3, (M3B defunct), M4, M5, M6, M7, M8
O = Offices: O1, O2, O3, O4, (O5 defunct)
R = Research: R1, R2, R3, R4, R5, R6, R7, R7A (annex), (R8 defunct), R9, R10, R11, (R12 defunct)
S = Services (badging, calibration, catering, financial, lock+key, merchandising, reprography, security)
TF = Test Facility: TF1, TF2, (TF3 renamed to M8)

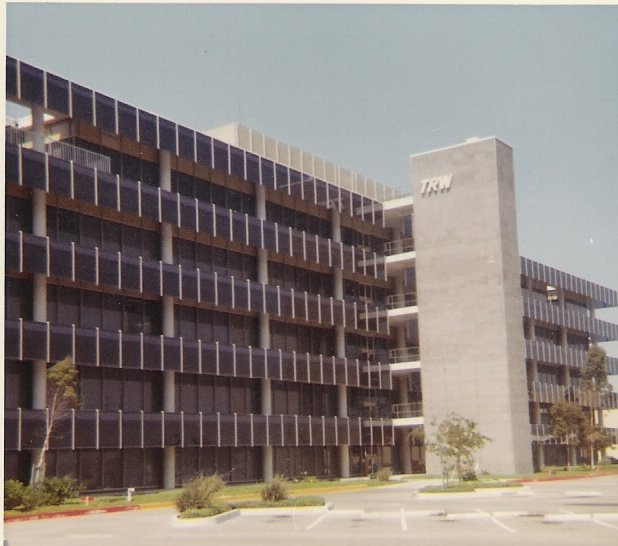
E1 in 1967 with TRW sign.

Names on the original building signs were hyphenated (e.g., "R-1" instead of "R1"); though some remain, most have been replaced by non-hyphenated ones.

Bldg. E2 houses a 3,500 sq. ft. museum that is open to the public during business hours. The exhibit includes a scale model of the Spirit of St. Louis, an original Pioneer 1 satellite, and an Apollo mission engine.

Shortly after acquiring TRW, NGC built the Space Technology Presentation Center north of E2 (shown on early maps as STPC or TPC), sometimes calling it Northrop Grumman Presentation Center before officially renaming it Aerospace Presentation Center (APC).

As business needs have fluctuated, other buildings (mostly identified by numbers without letters from 50 to 924 on maps) have been acquired or leased near Space Park in Redondo Beach, Manhattan Beach, El Segundo, and Torrance.

== Public milestones ==
STL, TRW, and NGC have made technological achievements at their other locations; but this section only chronicles publicized activities at, or closely related to, Space Park. A significant amount of the work on the campus involves spy satellites that cannot be listed because of national security secrets, and sometimes the delivery of these systems from Space Park can require closure of public facilities.

=== 1960s ===
- October 6, 1960 STL announced holding an option on land for a 10-building complex.
- 1960 STL purchased 110 acres from Santa Fe Railroad in Redondo Beach.
- December 7, 1960 Ground broken for first three buildings: R1 and R2 for research, and E for engineering (later renamed "E1" to distinguish it from an executive bldg. named "E2").

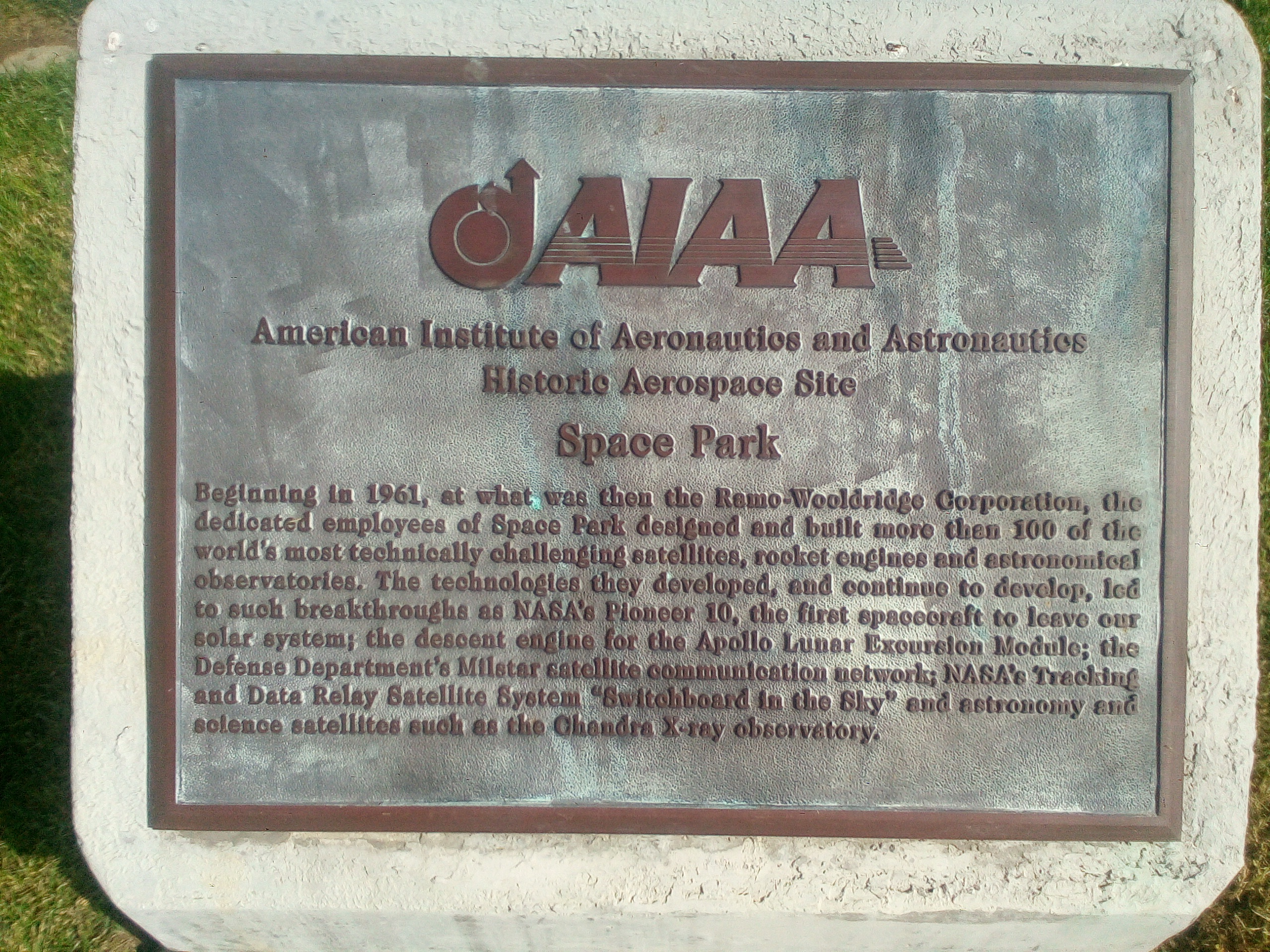
AIAA plaque commemorating Space Park's historic site designation in 2011 for work that began in 1961.

- January 6, 1961 STL awarded contract to build Orbiting Geophysical Observatories (OGO) to conduct experiments within Earth's atmosphere, magnetosphere, and in cis-lunar space to better understand Earth-Sun relationships and Earth itself as a planet.
- November 1, 1961 Ribbon-cutting ceremony held as R1 opened for business.
- November 24, 1961 STL awarded contract to build Vela satellites for detecting nuclear explosions.
- June 29, 1962 Senator Robert S. Kerr (Chairman of the Senate Committee on Aeronautical and Space Sciences) gave keynote speech for site's formal dedication after completing E1, M1, R1, R2, and R3.
- November 1962 Harold Peary (original star of The Great Gildersleeve) toured Space Park while serving as honorary mayor of Manhattan Beach.
- December 1962 NBC News aerospace reporter, Roy Neal promoted his Minuteman Missile book at Space Park.
- April–May 1963 NASA Administrator James E. Webb toured Space Park.
- May 1963 NASA selected STL to competitively develop a Lunar Excursion Module Descent Engine (LEMDE) for its Apollo program.
- June 24, 1963 Pamela Britton and Byron Keith promoted U.S. Savings Bonds at Space Park.
- October 16, 1963 Successful launch of the first pair of STL-built Vela satellites, which began enforcing the Partial Nuclear Test Ban Treaty.
- May 22, 1964 Ronald Reagan gave a speech for conservatism outside the Bldg. S cafeteria.
- July 16, 1964 Successful launch of the second pair of STL-built Vela satellites.
- July 1964 Lawrence Dobkin directed on-site filming of scenes for the Boy Meets Girl episode of My Living Doll starring Julie Newmar and Robert Cummings (aired September 27).
  - View of R1, E1, and R2 looking southwest during opening credits pans down to prop sign: SRC, Space Research Center Inc. This same scene was replayed at the beginning of The Love Machine episode.
  - 3 minutes in, Newmar walks northeast from E1 past the pool and R2 toward R1.
  - Still photos published in the Sentinel newspaper for TRW employees show Newmar continuing north from R2 with E1 in the background. In this scene that never aired, gardeners stare at her mesmerized, one of them humorously spraying the other with a water hose.
  - 4 minutes in, Cummings exits R1 to discuss Newmar's whereabouts with Henry Beckman.
  - 6 minutes in, Newmar walks southwest about 500 meters from Space Park with R2, E1, S, and M1 in the background, causing a traffic collision after crossing Aviation Boulevard at 12th Street in Manhattan Beach.
- 1964 Charles F. Haas directed on-site filming of scenes for the "Cold Hands, Warm Heart" episode of The Outer Limits starring William Shatner, Lloyd Gough, and Geraldine Brooks (aired September 26).
  - 4 minutes in, Shatner parks his car with Gough in the lot north of bldg. S.
  - 5 minutes in, Shatner and Gough enter bldg. E1 for a press conference (which appears to be in bldg. R2 with E1 in the background, apparently filmed in a studio against a film still of E1).
  - 6 minutes in, Shatner is shown the Space Environment Test Chamber in bldg. M1 and is told it can go from "315 degrees below 0 Fahrenheit to 275 above, and create a vacuum equivalent to 700,000 feet altitude" (its actual design specification)
  - 16.5 minutes in, the south entrance of bldg. R1 is shown with R3, S, and E1 in the background for an establishing shot.
  - 34 minutes in, another establishing shot of Shatner's car in the same parking lot as the opening scene, but in mirror image.
  - 41.5 minutes in, scene inside bldg. M1 staged so that Brooks appears to be coaxing Shatner in the Space Environment Chamber.
- September 5, 1964 Successful launch of the STL-built OGO-1, the first operational three-axis-stable spacecraft.
- October 8, 1964 Charlton Heston and Polly Bergen gave speeches against California Proposition 14 outside the Bldg. S cafeteria.
- January 18, 1965 NASA chose STL's LEMDE for its Apollo program.
- May 1965 STL became TRW Systems Group.
- July 17, 1965 Successful launch of the third pair of TRW-built Vela satellites.
- October 14, 1965 Successful launch of the TRW-built OGO-2.
- 1965 Dick Pick and Don Nelson began developing the Generalized Information Retrieval Language System at TRW to control the inventory of Cheyenne helicopter parts, which became a forerunner of the first multi-platform, general-purpose computing environments.
- 1966 United States Air Force awarded contract to TRW for Defense Support Program (DSP), a Satellite Early-Warning System to monitor ballistic-missile launches and nuclear explosions.
- May 9, 1966 Ronald Reagan returned to Space Park while campaigning to become governor.
- June 7, 1966 Successful launch of the TRW-built OGO-3.

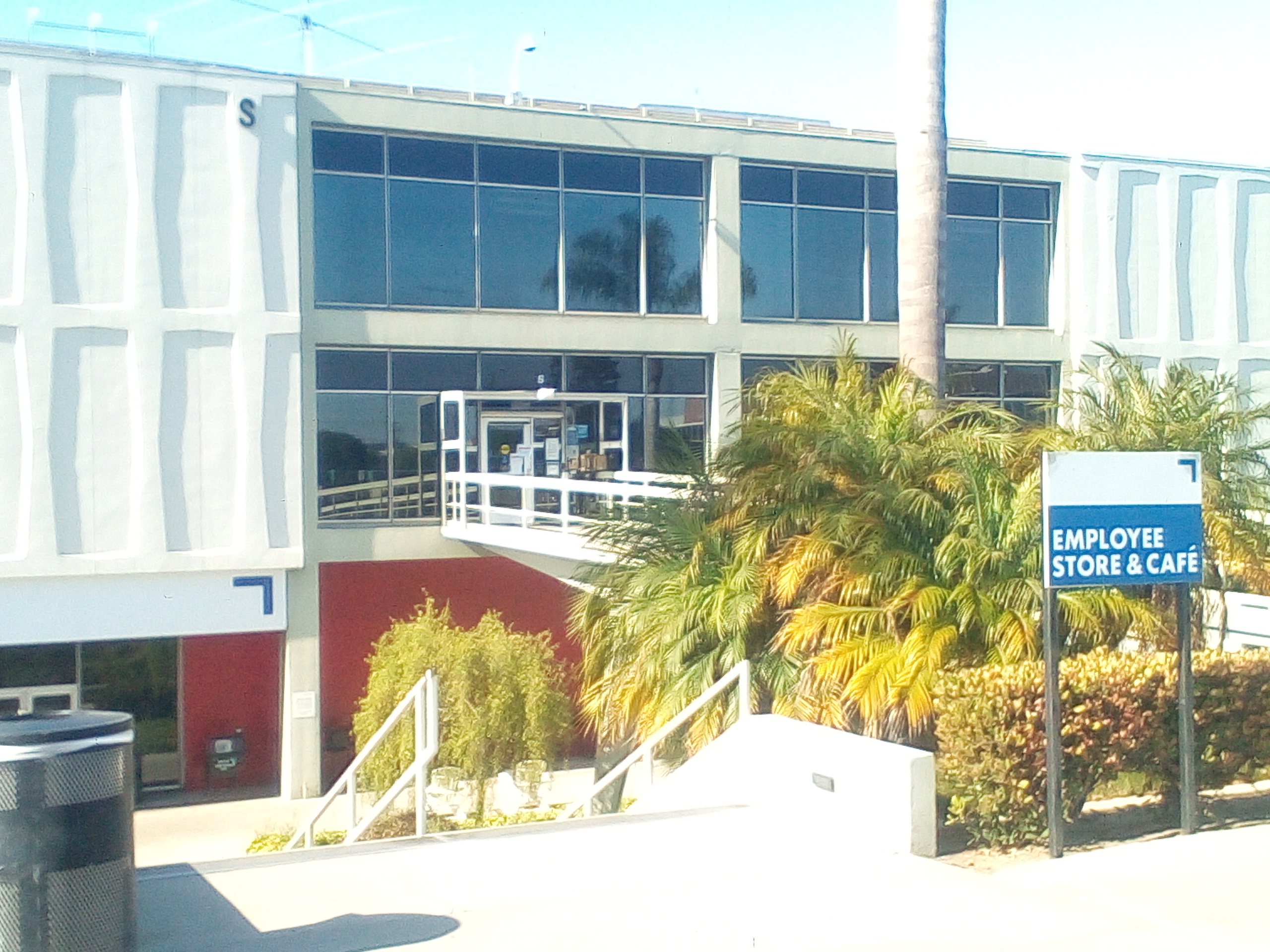
North side of Bldg. S where scenes from Countdown & Star Trek were filmed.

- October 1966 Robert Altman directed five short scenes on site for Countdown (under its working title of Moonshot).
  - 4 minutes in, Joanna Moore arrives in the parking lot north of R1 as the wife of an astronaut played by James Caan, who converses with his commander played by Robert Duvall, and their manager played by Steve Ihnat.
  - 19 minutes in, Duvall exits a staircase from the lower level of bldg. S, shunning the medical doctor played by Charles Aidman exiting the ground-level bridge.
  - 36 minutes in, a journalist confronts Aidman as he walks alongside the pool with R1 and R3 in the background.
  - 72 minutes in, extras pass by R2's east entry at night with the caption, "Space Control Center, Houston, Texas".
  - 95 minutes in, Moore sits on the pool's rim at night, then is joined by Duvall to discuss her husband's fate with E1 and R2 in the background.
- October 11, 1966 Pat Brown campaigned at Space Park, hoping to remain Governor of California for a third term.
- October 31, 1966 Ronald Reagan returned to Space Park for a third time (his second while campaigning to become governor) near the end of E2's construction.
- November 1, 1966 TRW was granted a patent for James Buie's coupling-transistor logic (later known as transistor–transistor logic (TTL), which he had filed on September 8, 1961, during Space Park's construction).
- February 15, 1967 Herschel Daugherty directed on-site filming of scenes for the "Operation -- Annihilate!" episode of Star Trek (aired April 13).
  - 7.5 minutes in, viewed from R3, Kirk, Spock, Bones, Scotty, and two other crew members beam down from their starship Enterprise to the east side of the pool between E1, R1, R2, and R3; then walk toward R3.
  - Briefly viewed from R2's roof, the crew proceeds southward along the west side of the pool walking toward the northwest corner of E1.
  - Briefly viewed from bldg. S, the crew proceeds eastward from the southeast corner of E1 toward the west side of S.
  - 8 minutes in, viewed from E2, the crew pauses at the northwest corner of S to discuss their observations, then backtracks toward E2.
  - 8.5 minutes in, on the lower-level patio of S, they observe four hostile men approaching from E2, who run down the northeast staircase toward them. They stun all four, then hear a woman scream from inside S, and run to her aid.
  - 16 minutes in (after having returned to the Enterprise), Kirk beams back down to the northeast staircase of S to rejoin the crew on the patio.
  - Indoor scenes where flying creatures attack the crew (paralyzing Spock) were not filmed in S, but in a studio decorated with hexagonal wall patterns resembling those on the exterior walls of S along with a small imitation of Space Park's two outdoor pools.
  - 30 minutes in (after recovering from the attack), Spock returns to the S patio alone, but is again attacked by a man whom he subdues.
  - 31 minutes in, establishing shots of the pool viewed from R2's roof, and E2 viewed from the lower-level patio of S.
- April 28, 1967 Successful launch of the fourth pair of TRW-built Vela satellites.
- July 28, 1967 Successful launch of the TRW-built OGO-4.
- 1967 TRW began designing, constructing, and testing a powertrain for a hybrid car using an electromechanical transmission built in M1, and a dynamometer in Bldg. 67.
- January 8, 1968 TRW filed a patent on the coaxial injector used in the LEMDE to provide combustion stability over a wide range of thrust.
- March 4, 1968 Successful launch of the TRW-built OGO-5.
- May 16, 1968 Robert F. Kennedy gave a presidential-campaign speech in the E1/R1/R2/R3 plaza three weeks before he was assassinated.
- September 10, 1968 Vice President Hubert Humphrey gave a presidential-campaign speech at Space Park.
- March 3, 1969 Space and Missile Systems Organization awarded contract to TRW for DSCS II satellites.
- March 17, 1969 TRW filed a patent for the powertrain of a hybrid car.
- 1969 Greg Morris toured Space Park, possibly related to using it as a filming location for Mission: Impossible.

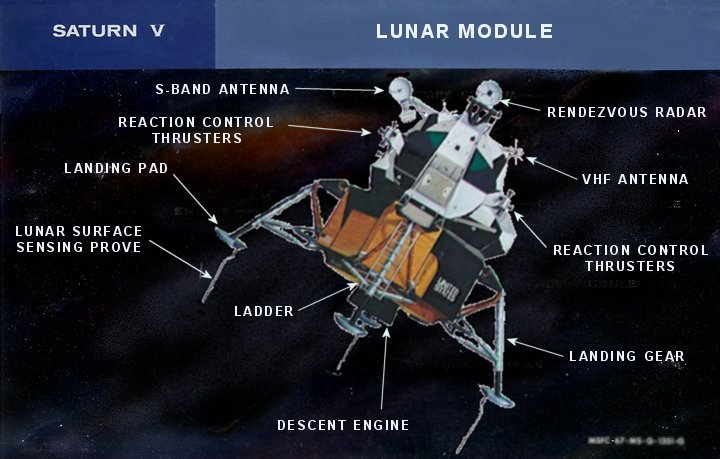
LM with TRW's descent engine

- May 22, 1969 Apollo 10 successfully used TRW's LEMDE for a controlled descent toward the Moon, bringing humans to 8.4 nautical miles (15.6 km) from its surface.
- May 23, 1969 Successful launch of the fifth pair of TRW-built Vela satellites.
- June 5, 1969 Successful launch of the TRW-built OGO-6.
- July 20, 1969 Apollo 11 successfully landed the first humans on the Moon using TRW's LEMDE.
- 1969 Alan Shepard, America's first astronaut on Mercury-Redstone 3 in 1961 and Apollo 14 commander in 1971, honored Space Park employees with Silver Snoopy awards in Bldg. M2.
- November 19, 1969 Apollo 12 successfully landed on the Moon using TRW's LEMDE.

=== 1970s ===
- February 1970 NASA awarded contract to TRW for Pioneer 10 to explore Jupiter, and Pioneer 11 as a backup.
- April 8, 1970 Successful launch of the final (sixth) pair of TRW-built Vela satellites, completing the system that provided scientific data on natural sources of space radiation.
- April 17, 1970 Apollo 13 used TRW's LEMDE to safely return its crew to Earth after aborting its lunar-landing mission.
- May 6, 1970 Apollo 13's crew (Jim Lovell, Jack Swigert, and Fred Haise) visited Space Park, telling an assembly of TRW employees that they should change the company's LEMDE advertising slogan from "The last 10 miles are on us" to "The last 300,000 miles are on us".
- November 6, 1970 Successful launch of the first DSP spacecraft built by TRW.
- February 5, 1971 Apollo 14 successfully landed on the Moon using TRW's LEMDE.
- March 2, 1971 TRW was granted a patent for the powertrain of a hybrid car.
- June 1971 OGO data acquisition period concluded, resulting in a record-breaking volume of scientific data.
- July 30, 1971 Apollo 15 successfully landed on the Moon using TRW's LEMDE.
- November 1, 1971 TRW filed a patent on a coaxial-pintle reactant injector to provide combustion stability in burners over a wide range of flow conditions.
- November 2, 1971 Successful launch of the first pair of TRW-built DSCS II satellites, the first operational military communications system to occupy a geosynchronous orbit.

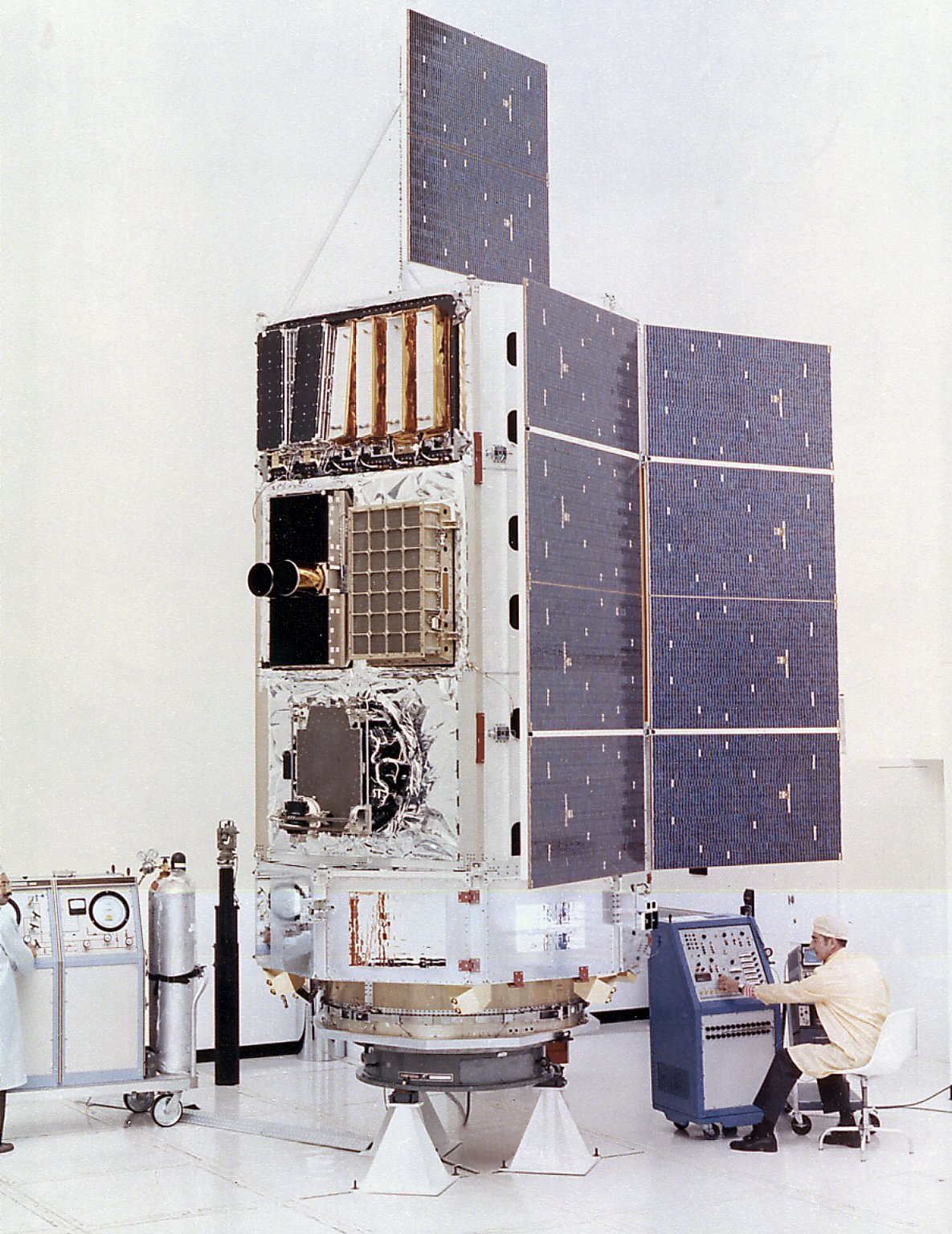
1st of 3 HEAO at Space Park.

- 1971 TRW won contract to build three High Energy Astronomy Observatory (HEAO) spacecraft for X-ray, Gamma-Ray astronomy, and Cosmic-Ray investigations.
- February 1972 TRW demonstrated its hybrid car would meet emission goals for 1975/76 set by the United States Environmental Protection Agency.
- March 2, 1972 Successful launch of the TRW-built Pioneer 10, the world’s first nuclear-powered deep-space probe.
- April 21, 1972 Apollo 16 successfully landed on the Moon using TRW's LEMDE.
- October 24, 1972 TRW was granted a patent for Gerard Elverum's rocket-engine injector.
- December 11, 1972 Apollo 17 successfully landed on the Moon using TRW's LEMDE.
- February 1973 TRW's Pioneer 10 became the first spacecraft to successfully traverse the asteroid belt between Mars and Jupiter.
- April 5, 1973 Successful launch of the TRW-built Pioneer 11 to fly past Saturn.
- May 15, 1973 TRW was granted a continuation-in-part to their patent for the powertrain of a hybrid car.
- November 27, 1973 President Richard Nixon sent congratulatory letter to TRW VP/GM (Dr. G.E. Solomon) after Pioneer 10 successfully completed Jupiter mission.
- July 1976 TRW's biological testing devices landed on Mars and began seeking life.
- August 12, 1977 Successful launch of the TRW-built HEAO-1 to record images of astronomical objects that emit high-energy particles.
- November 1977 TRW published R.J. Lano's N^{2} chart, "an implementation tool and methodology for the tabulation, definition, analysis and description of functional interactions and interfaces."
- November 13, 1978 Successful launch of the TRW-built Einstein Observatory (HEAO-2), the first with a fully imaging focusing X-ray telescope with a sensitivity several hundred times greater than previously achieved.
- July 24, 1979 Ray Bradbury gave a lecture in bldg. S titled "1984 will Never Arrive".
- September 20, 1979 Successful launch of the TRW-built HEAO-3 to complete the program’s mission of probing the electromagnetic spectrum.

=== 1980s ===
- June 10, 1980 TRW was granted a patent for Gerard Elverum's coaxial-pintle reactant injector for burners (i.e., combustion apparatus).
- February 1983 TRW won contract to build Compton Gamma Ray Observatory (CGRO) with four astrophysics experiments.
- April 4, 1983 STS-6, the maiden flight of Space Shuttle Challenger, successfully launched the first of seven TRW-built Tracking and Data Relay Satellite System (TDRS) spacecraft.
- June 14, 1983 TRW's Pioneer 10 became the first spacecraft to leave the Solar System.

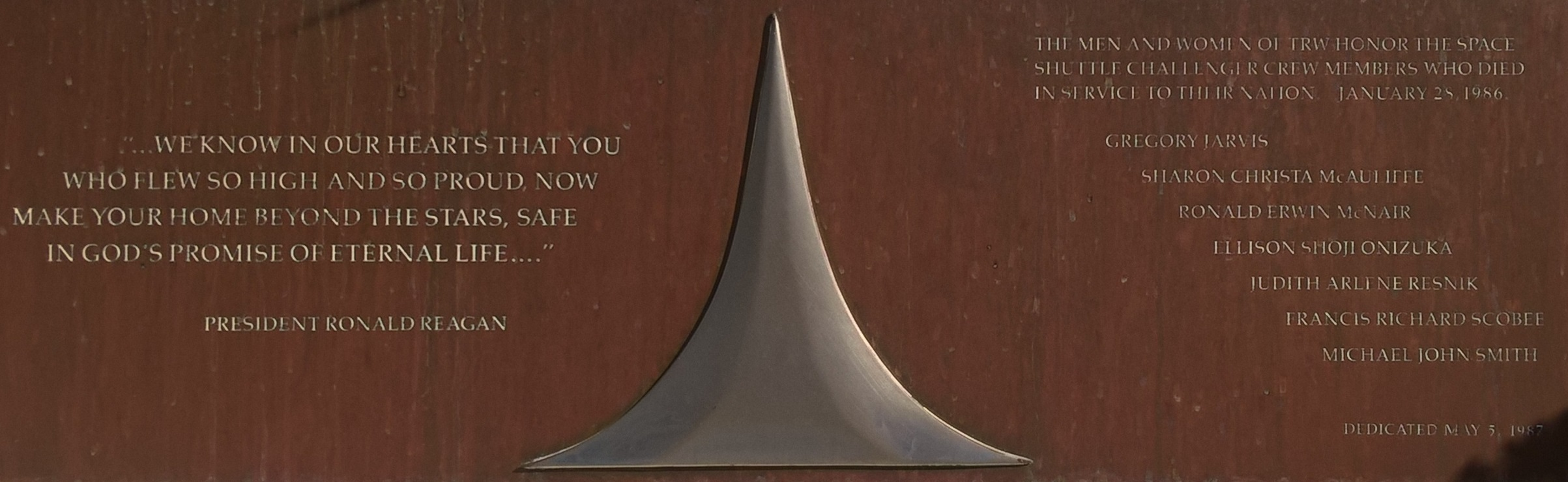
Plaque west of E2 honoring Challenger crew.

- January 28, 1986 Along with the lives of all seven astronauts, STS-51-L lost the second TRW-built TDRS spacecraft.
- May 29, 1986 NASA announced plans to buy a backup TDRS to replace the one lost in the Space Shuttle Challenger disaster.
- May 5, 1987 Dedication of memorial at flagpole west of E2, "The men and women of TRW honor the Space Shuttle Challenger crew members who died in service to their nation."
- March 26, 1988 Vice President George H. W. Bush campaigned at Space Park for an election he won later that year, subsequently becoming the 41st President of the United States.
- April 12, 1988 R7A was dedicated as terrestrial headquarters for assembly, test, and integration of the 17-ton CGRO satellite.
- November 21, 1988 Mettler Drive was dedicated upon his retirement after 33 years of company service.

=== 1990s ===
- 1990 TRW opened a Center for Automotive Technology to manage projects such as airbag inflators, automotive radar and electronic crash sensors.
- April 5, 1991 Successful launch of the TRW-built CGRO spacecraft by the Space Shuttle Atlantis.
- June 22, 1993 Vice President Al Gore toured Space Park to learn about its defense conversion activities.
- February 7, 1994 Successful launch of the first TRW-built Milstar payload with autonomous processing, routing and network management capabilities, assuring communications under any level of military conflict.
- June 1994 TRW began jointly developing Formosat-1 with Taiwan's National Space Organization.
- July 13, 1995 Space Shuttle Discovery (STS-70) successfully launched the final (seventh) TRW-built TDRS spacecraft.
- May 1997 TRW delivered Formosat-1, Taiwan's first spacecraft, a satellite built for space experiments in physics, oceanography and communications.
- February 1998 Astronauts Michel Tognini and Eileen Collins (the first woman pilot on STS-63) inspected the Advanced X-ray Astrophysics Facility (AXAF, later renamed to Chandra) in bldg. TF2.
- 1998 Completion of the final (23rd) DSP spacecraft built by TRW (not launched till 2007).
- January 14, 1999 TRW held ceremony after completing tests of the Chandra X-ray Observatory (the world's most powerful X-ray telescope) prior to shipping it for launch aboard Space Shuttle Columbia (STS-93).
- December 1999 TRW set a new integrated circuit speed record (69 GHz) to increase volumes of Internet traffic.

=== 2000s ===
- May 4, 2002 Successful launch of the TRW-built Aqua (based on TRW's modular, standardized AB1200 common spacecraft bus) as part of the Earth Observing System (EOS) to study Earth's water cycle using instruments such as the Clouds and the Earth's Radiant Energy System (also built at Space Park).

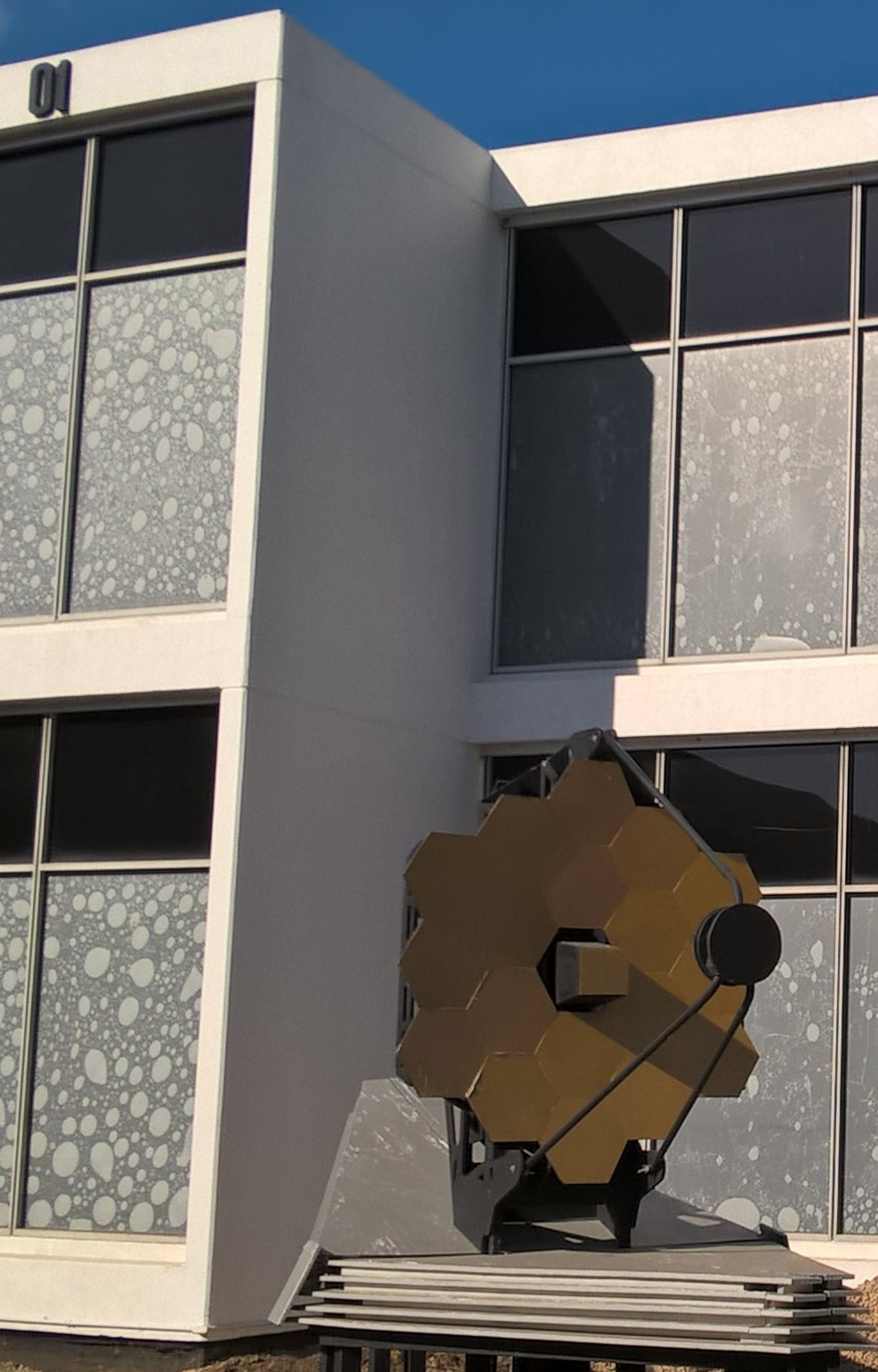
James Webb Space Telescope model outside bldg. O1.

- September 11, 2002 NASA selected TRW as the prime contractor for the James Webb Space Telescope (JWST) (estimating it would launch in 2010).
- November 4, 2002 NGC filed with the U.S. Securities and Exchange Commission to acquire TRW.
- December 11, 2002 Northrop Grumman completed its merger with and into TRW.
- December 16, 2002 "Day One" event held at Space Park to celebrate Northrop Grumman's acquisition of TRW.
- November 25, 2003 Grand opening of STPC (later renamed to APC) attended by U.S. Representative for Space Park's district, Jane Harman.
- July 15, 2004 Successful launch of the NGC-built Aura as part of EOS to study how Earth's atmosphere supports diversified life, becoming the first satellite to gauge the concentration and movement of gases in the troposphere.
- February 22, 2005 Governor Arnold Schwarzenegger toured Space Park and gave a speech in the STPC.
- March 18, 2009 NGC produced the strongest laser powered by an electric current (105 kW for the Joint High Power Solid State Laser program).

=== 2010s ===
- December 14, 2011 The AIAA designated Space Park a historic aerospace site, where many technically challenging satellites, rocket engines, and astronomical observatories have been designed and built.
- February 2, 2018 The optical telescope and integrated science instrument module of JWST arrived at Space Park.
- July 11, 2019 Final thermal-vacuum test completed in bldg. M4 for JWST to ensure its electronic functionality in space.

=== 2020s ===
- October 6, 2020 Acoustic and sine vibration environmental tests completed for JWST to simulate its launch conditions.
- March 5, 2021 Nichelle Nichols (who portrayed Lieutenant Nyota Uhura in the original Star Trek TV show) filmed scenes in Bldg. D1 for Renegades: Ominara proof of concept TV pilot.
- September 2021 Final testing in bldg. M8 completed successfully for JWST.
- December 25, 2021 Successful launch of JWST.
- January 24, 2022 JWST successfully arrived at Lagrange point L2 about 1.5 million kilometers from Earth.
- February 2022 JWST began transmitting images from L2.
- September 12, 2024 Presentation and discussion of A Beautiful Planet film in Bldg. E2 by STS-130 pilot and Expedition 43 commander, Terry W. Virts.
- October 18, 2024 NGC won Coolest Thing Made in California contest for its record-setting 1 THz microelectronics chip manufactured in Bldg. D1.

== Famous employees ==
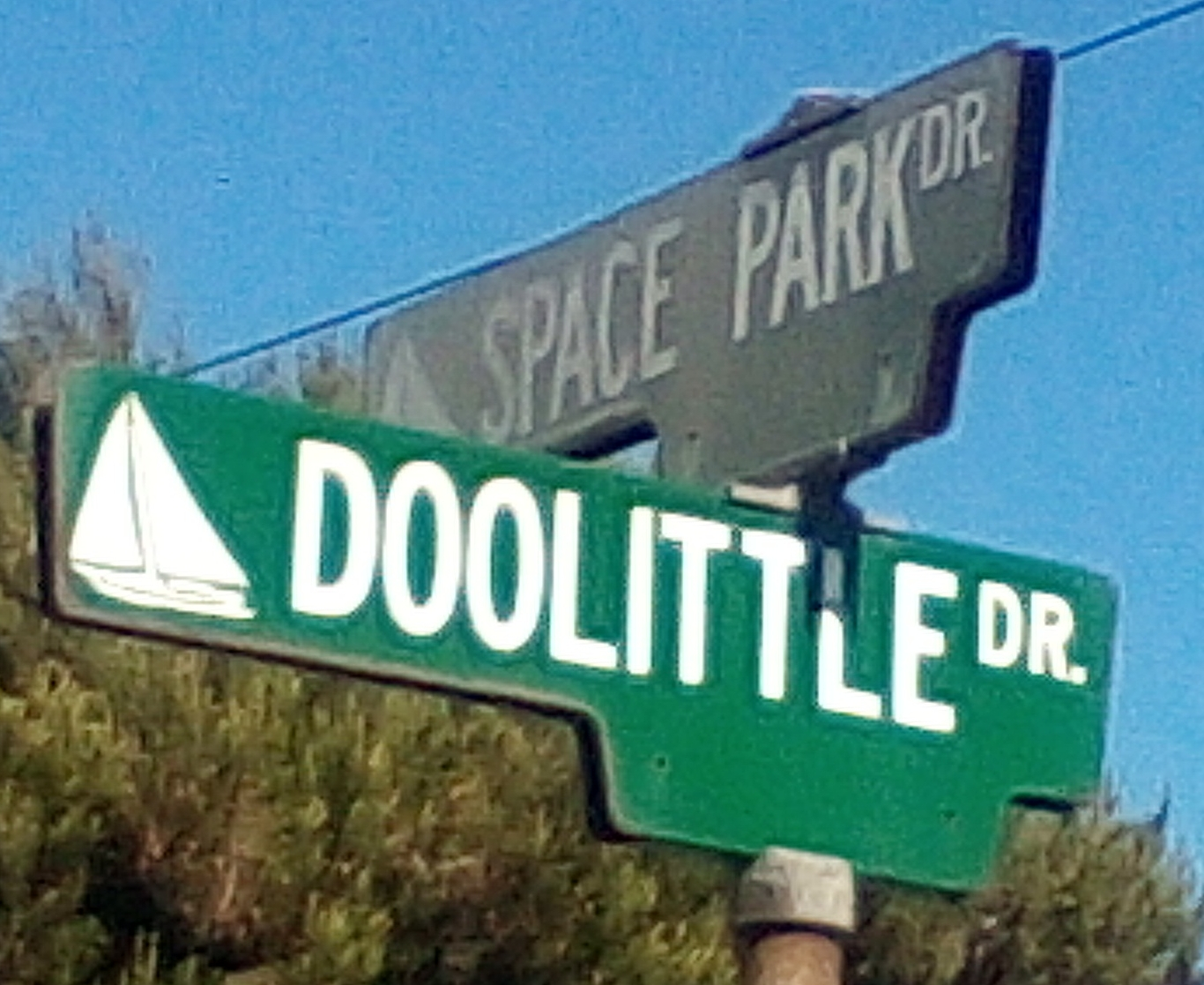
Street named after Jimmy Doolittle

- Christopher John Boyce: TRW clerk from July 29, 1974, to December 17, 1976 given access to classified documents in bldg. M4 beginning in March 1975; subsequently convicted of selling United States secrets to the Soviet Union, dramatized in a 1985 film based on the 1979 book, The Falcon and the Snowman
- Chuck Missler: Ramo-Wooldridge systems engineer and STL senior analyst, subsequently Bible teacher and co-founder of Koinonia House
- Daniel Goldin: NASA’s longest-tenured Administrator from 1992 to 2001 reporting to three U.S. Presidents
- Dennis Tito: TRW employee during the late 1960s, subsequently the first self-funded space tourist
- Edward Gibson: Astronaut on Skylab 4 for a record time in space of 84 days, subsequently project manager of TRW's studies for Space Station Freedom.
- Garrett Reisman: TRW spacecraft guidance navigation and control engineer from 1996 to 1998 who designed the thruster-based attitude control system for the Aqua satellite (launched May 4, 2002), subsequently astronaut on STS-123, spending 3 months on the International Space Station (returning on STS-124)
- Henry Nicholas: TRW engineer, subsequently co-founder of Broadcom Corporation
- Henry Samueli: TRW engineer and manager, subsequently co-founder of Broadcom Corporation and co-owner of Anaheim Ducks
- James L. Buie: TRW engineer who invented TTL circuitry in the early 1960s (patented November 1, 1966), established TRW's Microelectronics Center in 1963, and its LSI (large-scale integration) Products Division in 1977 before retiring in 1983
- Jerry Buss: TRW chemist, subsequently majority owner of Los Angeles Lakers
- Jimmy Doolittle: STL's board chairman, first to fly across the United States in less than a day (22 hours in 1922), first to fly blind (completely by instruments), and leader of the 1942 Tokyo air raid; commemorated by Doolittle Drive (connecting Space Park Drive to Manhattan Beach Boulevard)

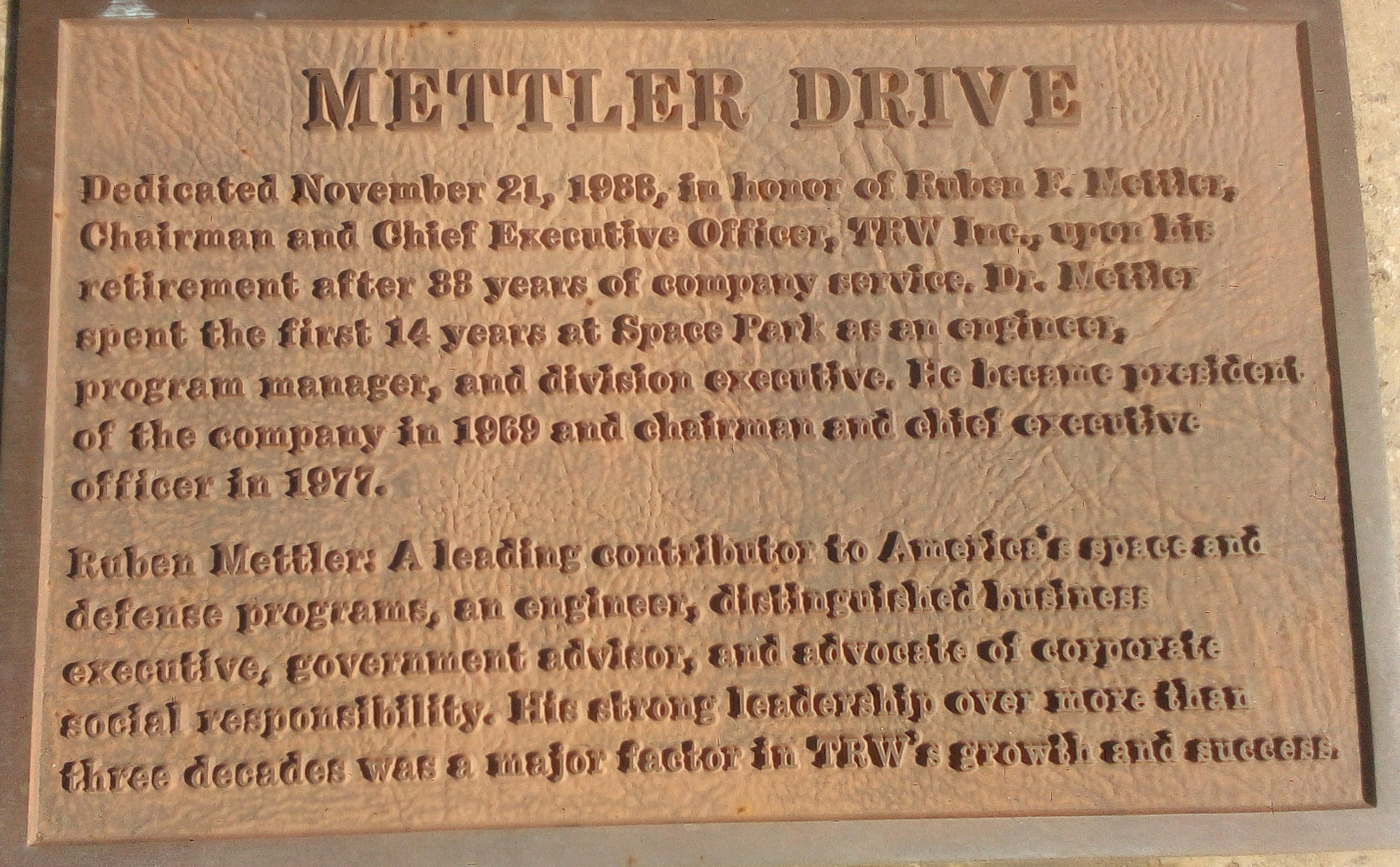
Plaque honoring Ruben Mettler between R4 and M1

- Ruben F. Mettler: TRW's president and chief executive officer from 1969 to 1977; chairman and chief executive officer from 1977 to 1988; commemorated by Mettler Drive (connecting Space Park Drive to Marine Avenue)
- Simon Ramo: TRW's co-founder, popularly known as the father of the intercontinental ballistic missile; commemorated by Simon Ramo Drive (central Space Park entrance from Marine Avenue)
- Theodore Harold Maiman: Invented the laser in 1960, subsequently set up a new division for communications and digital signal processing as Vice President of Advanced Technology at TRW from 1976 to 1983
- Tom Mueller: TRW propulsion engineer, subsequently founding employee of SpaceX
- Wesley G. Bush: TRW systems engineer, later CEO of Northrop Grumman.

Note: Dean Wooldridge, TRW's co-founder and first president, announced his resignation around the time STL employees began moving to Space Park; so it is unlikely that he ever worked at this location.

Despite this list consisting exclusively of men, actress Elaine Joyce chose Space Park as the place to find a woman engineer while researching a bit part for Hart to Hart in 1980.

== See also ==
- Aviation High School (California) – describes the history of 40 acres adjacent to Space Park's southwest boundary
