= Skip Homeier =

American actor (1930–2017)

- Homeier in Dan Raven, 1960
- Born: George Vincent Homeier; October 5, 1930; Chicago, Illinois, U.S.
- Died: June 25, 2017 (aged 86); Indian Wells, California, U.S.
- Occupation: Actor
- Years active: 1941–1982
- Known for: Tomorrow, the World!; Halls of Montezuma; Fixed Bayonets!; The Ghost and Mr. Chicken; The Way to Eden; Beachhead
- Spouses: Nancy Van Noorden Field (m. 1951; div. 1962) Della Sharman (m. 1963)
- Children: 2

George Vincent Homeier (October 5, 1930 – June 25, 2017), known professionally as Skip Homeier, was an American actor who started his career at the age of eleven and became a child star.

== Career ==
=== Child actor ===
Homeier was born in Chicago, Illinois, on October 5, 1930. He began to act for radio shows at the age of six as Skippy Homeier. At the age of 11, he worked on the radio show Portia Faces Life and did commercials on The O'Neills and Against the Storm. In 1942, he joined the casts of Wheatena Playhouse and We, the Abbotts. In 1943 and 1944 he played the role of Emil, a child indoctrinated into Nazism who is brought to the United States from Germany following the death of his parents, in the Broadway play and film Tomorrow, the World!. He played the troubled youngster in the film adaptation of Tomorrow, the World! (1944).

=== Adult roles ===
Homeier changed his first name from Skippy to Skip when he turned eighteen. He attended the University of California, Los Angeles.

Although Homeier worked frequently throughout his childhood and adolescence, playing wayward youths with no chance of redemption, he did not become a major star, but he did make a transition from child actor to adult, especially in a range of roles as delinquent youths, common in Hollywood films of the 1950s. Some of these films were film noir works.

He also developed a talent for playing strong character roles in war films, such as Halls of Montezuma (1950), Sam Fuller's Fixed Bayonets! (1951) and Beachhead (1954).

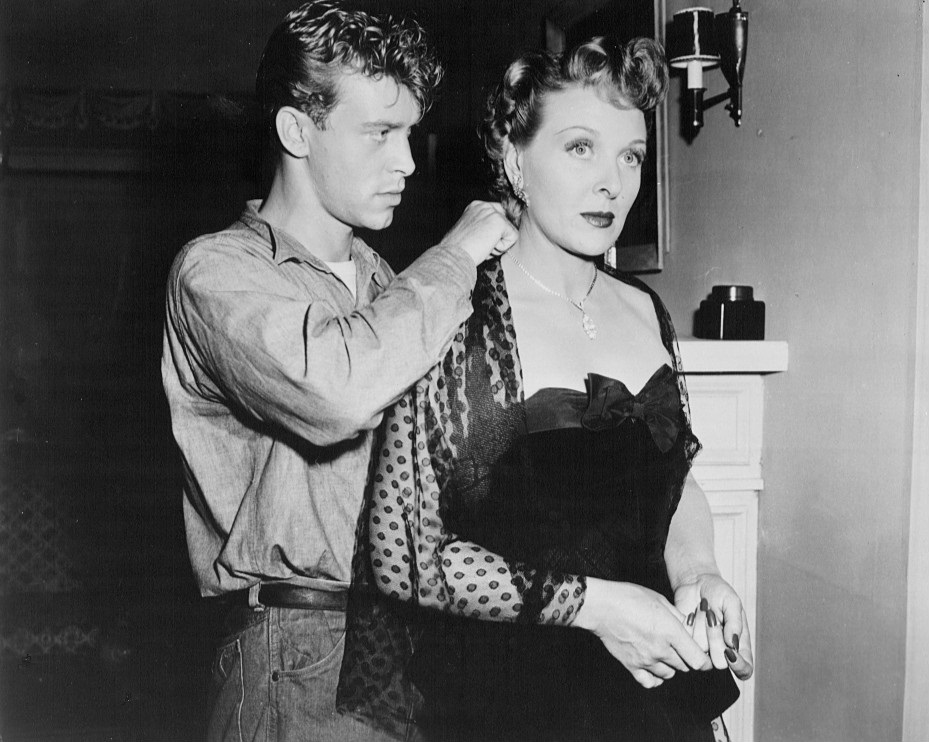
Homeier and Evelyn Ankers in the General Electric Theater presentation of "The Hunted", 1954

In 1954, he guest-starred in an episode of the NBC legal drama Justice, based on cases of the Legal Aid Society of New York. He was cast later in an episode of Steve McQueen's Wanted Dead or Alive, a CBS Western series. Homeier played a man sought for a crime of which he is innocent, but who has no faith in the legal system's ability to provide justice. Fleeing from McQueen's bounty hunter character Josh Randall, Homeier's character's foot slips and he accidentally falls to his death from a cliff.

He appeared in a 1956 episode of Alfred Hitchcock Presents, with co-star Joanne Woodward entitled "Momentum". Homeier appeared as Kading in an episode of the NBC western Jefferson Drum ("The Post", 1958), starring Jeff Richards. In 1959, he appeared as a drover named Lucky in Rawhide, Incident of the Blue Fire. In 1960, Skip appeared on an episode of The Rifleman: The Spoiler as Brud Evans. Then, from 1960 to 1961, he starred in the title role in Dan Raven, a short-lived NBC crime drama set on Sunset Strip of West Hollywood, California, with a number of celebrities playing themselves in guest roles. The series only lasted for thirteen episodes. In the summer of 1961, he appeared in an episode of The Asphalt Jungle, and later that same year, he performed as a replacement drover and temporary "ramrod" in an episode of Rawhide ("Incident of the Long Shakedown"). Homeier was also cast as “Wichita Kid” in a Rawhide episode airing November 23, 1965, entitled “Brush War at Buford”.

Homeier also made two guest appearances on Perry Mason, both times as the defendant. In 1961, he played Dr. Edley in "The Case of the Pathetic Patient", and in 1965, he played the police sergeant Dave Wolfe in "The Case of the Silent Six". In 1964, he guest-starred in The Addams Family episode "Halloween with the Addams Family" with Don Rickles. Also in 1964, he portrayed Dr. Roy Clinton in The Outer Limits episode "Expanding Human" (1963). In a very busy year, he also appeared in the Combat! episode "The Impostor" (1964, S3 E10). He also appeared in the Combat! episode "Night Patrol" (1963, S1 E22) as Lt. Billy Joe Cranston.

Homeier was cast in the feature film The Ghost and Mr. Chicken (1966) with Don Knotts.

He continued to be cast frequently on television as a guest star, often as a villain. He appeared in all four of Irwin Allen's science-fiction series in the mid-to-late 1960s. He guest-starred on Star Trek: The Original Series in two episodes: as the Nazi-like character Melakon in "Patterns of Force" (1968) and as Dr. Sevrin in "The Way to Eden" (1969). He appeared on Longstreet (1971). In 1969, he was a guest star on the TV show Mannix, in the third-season episode called "A Sleep in the Deep". One of his last roles was a one-liner in the television film The Wild Wild West Revisited (1979) as a senior Secret Service official. He retired from acting aged 50.

=== Death ===
Homeier died on June 25, 2017, at the age of 86 from spinal myelopathy at his home in Indian Wells, California. He is survived by his wife, Della, and his sons Peter and Michael from his first marriage (1951–1962) to Nancy Van Noorden Field.

== Selected filmography ==
- Tomorrow, the World! (1944) – Emil Bruckner
- Boys' Ranch (1946) – Skippy
- Arthur Takes Over (1948) – Arthur Bixby
- Mickey (1948) – Hank Evans
- The Big Cat (1949) – Jim Hawks – Gil's Son
- The Gunfighter (1950) – Hunt Bromley
- Halls of Montezuma (1951) – Pretty Boy
- Sealed Cargo (1951) – Steve
- Fixed Bayonets! (1951) – Whitey
- Sailor Beware (1952) – Mac
- Has Anybody Seen My Gal (1952) – Carl Pennock
- The Last Posse (1953) – Art Romer
- Beachhead (1954) – Reynolds
- The Lone Gun (1954) – Cass Downing
- Dawn at Socorro (1954) – Buddy Ferris
- Black Widow (1954) – John Amberly
- Cry Vengeance (1954) – Roxey Davis
- Ten Wanted Men (1955) – Howie Stewart
- The Road to Denver (1955) – Sam Mayhew
- At Gunpoint (1955) – Bob Dennis
- Science Fiction Theater (1955-1956) – Episodes "Death at 2 A.M.", "The Other Side of the Moon", "Living Lights".
- Alfred Hitchcock Presents (1956) (Season 1 Episode 39: "Momentum") – Richard Paine
- Stranger at My Door (1956) – Clay Anderson
- Dakota Incident (1956) – Frank Banner
- Thunder Over Arizona (1956) – Tim Mallory
- The Burning Hills (1956) – Jack Sutton
- Between Heaven and Hell (1956) – Private Swanson – Company G
- The Human Barrier (1957) – Capt. Gene Lipton
- No Road Back (1957) – John Railton
- The Tall T (1957) – Billy Jack
- Alfred Hitchcock Presents (1958) (Season 3 Episode 17: "The Motive") – Tommy Greer
- Day of the Badman (1958) – Howard Hayes
- Plunderers of Painted Flats (1959) – Joe Martin
- Rawhide
  - (S2:E11, "Incident of the Blue Fire") (1959) – Lucky Markley
  - (S4:E3, "The Long Shakedown") (1961) - Jess Clayton
- Lawman Season 2 Episode 20 " Gunman" (1959)
- Comanche Station (1960) – Frank
- The Rifleman (1960, TV Series) – Brud Evans
- Stark Fear (1962) – Gerald Winslow
- The Virginian
  - (S1:E27, "Strangers At Sundown") (1963) – Jed Carter
  - (S2:E8, "A Portrait of Marie Valonne") (1963) – Sergeant Danny Bohannon
  - (S3:E6, "The Brazos Kid") (1964) – Joe Cleary
  - (S7:E18, "The Price of Love") (1969) – Callan
- Showdown (1963) – Caslon
- Combat! (1963 episode – "Night Patrol") – Billy Joe
- Bullet for a Badman (1964) – Pink
- Combat! (1964 episode – "The Imposter") – Sergeant Morgan
- The Outer Limits (1964 episode – "Expanding Human") – Dr. Roy Clinton
- Rawhide (1965) – Wichita Kid in S8:E11, "Brush War at Buford"
- The Ghost and Mr. Chicken (1966) – Ollie Weaver
- ’’Voyage to the Bottom of the Sea’’ (1966 episode – “The Day the World Ended”) – Senator William Dennis
- Combat! (1967 episode – "Entombed") – Lieutenant Karl Mauer
- "Patterns of Force" (Star Trek episode, 1968) – Deputy Führer Melakon
- ’’Voyage to the Bottom of the Sea’’ (1968 episode – “Attack!”) – Robek
- "The Way to Eden" (Star Trek episode, 1969) – Dr. Rota Sevrin
- Tiger by the Tail (1970) – Deputy Sheriff Laswell
- The Strange Monster of Strawberry Cove (1971) – Harry
- Starbird and Sweet William (1973) – Ranger
- Helter Skelter (1976, television movie) – Judge Older
- The Greatest (1977) – Major
- The Incredible Hulk (1979) – Dr. Robert Stanley
- Vega$ (TV Series) (1980) - Frederick Barr
- Showdown at Eagle Gap (1982) – Alexander Kirk (final film role)
