= The Human Barrier =

- Studio One episode
- Skip Homeier in "The Human Barrier"
- Episode no.: Season 9 Episode 42
- Directed by: Perry Lafferty
- Written by: Richard DeRoy
- Original air date: July 29, 1957

Guest appearances
- Skip Homeier as Capt. Gene Lipton; Pat Hingle as Major Gergman; John Beal as Major Saks; Patricia Smith as Ginny Lipton

Episode chronology
← Previous "In Love With a Stranger"	Next → "My Mother and How She Undid Me"

"The Human Barrier" was an American television play that was broadcast by CBS on July 29, 1957, as part of the television series, Westinghouse Studio One Summer Theatre. The production reviews the investigation into the crash of an Air Force test plane and the human limitations on supersonic and high altitude flight.

== Plot ==
The production examines the "human barrier", a term used at the time to describe the human limitations on supersonic and high altitude flight.

While flying an experimental plane at 70,000 feet, an Air Force test pilot, Capt. Gene Lipton, crashes and cannot recall the moments leading up to the crash. A detailed accident investigation and a hearing before a board of officers concludes that the crash was caused by human error and that the plane's mechanical systems were sound. However, the investigation also shows that the location of the radio, on the floor behind the pilot, resulted in pilot vertigo at high altitude and speed, demonstrating a need for a design change.

In the break between the first and second acts, John Cameron Swayze presented a history of aviation and of the United States Air Force.

Chief of the Air Force Thomas D. White appears in an epilogue where he reviews that Air Forces's flight safety programs.

== Cast ==
The following actors received screen credit for their performances:

- John Cameron Swayze, narrator
- Skip Homeier as Capt. Gene Lipton
- Pat Hingle as Major Bergman
- John Beal as Major Saks
- Patricia Smith as Ginny Lipton
- Philip Bourneuf as Gen. Gerringer
- Russell Hardie as Mr. Woodward
- Frank Campanella as Major Richards
- Ross Martin as Lt. Maxwell
- Fred J. Scolay as Sgt. Buckley
- Tom Middleton as Capt. Rice
- John Shellie as Mr. Hopewell
- Billy Quinn as Craig Hopewell
- Carlton Colyer as The Hospital Orderly
- William Clemens as The Air Policeman
- Jim Boles as Mr. Clinton
- Florence Anglin as Mrs. Clinton
- Henderson Forsythe as Dr. Barnes
- Peter von Zerneck as Dr. Heinz
- Thomas D. White as himself

== Production ==
The television play was presented in honor of the golden anniversary of the United States Air Force.

It was produced by Norman Felton and directed by Perry Lafferty. It was written by Richard DeRoy and narrated by John Cameron Swayze. The settings were designed by Neil DeLuca.

The production assisted by the Directorate of Flight Safety Research of the U.S. Air Force and Brigadier General Joseph D. Caldara, the Air Force's director of flight safety research. Major Vernon R. Stutts served as a technical advisor.

== Reception ==
The Chicago Tribune called the play "interesting tho tedious" and described the characters were "stock" and some of the dialogue "too technical."

Critic Ogden Dwight called it overly technical and dramatically lacking.
