= Expanding Human =

- The Outer Limits episode
- Episode no.: Season 2 Episode 4
- Directed by: Gerd Oswald
- Written by: Francis Cockrell
- Cinematography by: Kenneth Peach
- Production code: 40
- Original air date: October 10, 1964

Guest appearances
- Skip Homeier; Keith Andes; James Doohan

Episode chronology
← Previous "Behold, Eck!"	Next → "Demon with a Glass Hand"

"Expanding Human" is an episode of the original The Outer Limits television show, first broadcast on October 10, 1964, during the second season.

== Control voice (shortened intro) ==
There is nothing wrong with your Television set. Do not attempt to adjust the picture. We are controlling transmission. For the next hour we will control all that you see and hear. You are about to experience the awe and mystery which reaches from the inner mind to The Outer Limits.

== Introduction ==
A man experiments with consciousness expanding drugs and accidentally lets loose the monster inside himself.

== Opening narration ==
As far back as men have recorded their history, veils have been lowered to disclose a vast new reality –rents in the fabric of Man's awareness. And somewhere, in the endless search of the curious mind, lies the next vision, the next key to his infinite capacity...

== Plot ==
Professor Peter Wayne is disturbed to hear that his university colleague, Dr. Roy Clinton, is pursuing forbidden drug experiments with a group of graduate students. When one of the students turns up dead, Professor Wayne investigates Clinton's activities. He discovers that consciousness-expansion can have powerful and dangerous consequences.

== Closing narration ==
Some success, some failure, but either way the gnawing hunger to know is never sated, and the road to the unknown continues to be dark and strange.

== Cast ==
- Skip Homeier – as Dr. Roy Clinton
- James Doohan – as police Lt. Branch
- Keith Andes – as professor Peter Wayne
- Jason Wingreen – as Coroner Leland
- Robert Doyle – as Marc Lake
- Shirley O'Hara – as receptionist
- Troy Melton – as Sgt. Alger
- Owen McGiveney – as watchman
- Mary Gregory – as apartment manager
- Aki Aleong – as Akada
- Vaughn Taylor – as Dean Flint
- Barbara Wilkin – as Susan Wayne
- Peter Duryea – as Morrow
- Michael Falcon – as elevator operator
- Sherwood Keith – as Bellaire (uncredited)
- Bill Cort – as elevator man (uncredited)

(Homeier, Doohan, Andes, Wingreen and Duryea all appeared in Star Trek: The Original Series)
