= Live Again, Die Again =

- Genre: Science Fiction; Thriller
- Based on: Come to Mother by David Sale
- Written by: Joseph Stefano
- Directed by: Richard A. Colla
- Starring: Cliff Potts; Walter Pidgeon; Donna Mills; Mike Farrell; Geraldine Page; Vera Miles
- Music by: George Romanis
- Country of origin: United States
- Original language: English

Production
- Executive producer: David Victor
- Producer: Robert F. O'Neill
- Production locations: Universal Studios - 100 Universal City Plaza, Universal City, California
- Cinematography: Michael Margulies
- Editors: Robert L. Kimble; Jamie Caylor
- Running time: 78 minutes
- Production company: Universal Television

Original release
- Network: ABC
- Release: February 16, 1974

Live Again, Die Again is a 1974 American made-for-television science fiction thriller film starring Cliff Potts, Walter Pidgeon, Donna Mills, Mike Farrell, Geraldine Page and Vera Miles. It is directed by Richard A. Colla from a teleplay written by Joseph Stefano, based on the novel Come to Mother by David Sale. The film premiered as the ABC Movie of the Week on February 16, 1974.

== Plot ==
A young woman is the first person to be revived from cryogenic suspension, but someone wants to ensure that her resurrection is brief.

== Cast ==
- Cliff Potts as Joe Dolan
- Walter Pidgeon as Thomas Carmichael
- Donna Mills as Caroline Carmichael
- Mike Farrell as James Carmichael
- Geraldine Page as Mrs. O'Neill
- Vera Miles as Marcia Carmichael
- Stewart Moss as Wilson
- Lurene Tuttle as Betty Simpson
- Walker Edmiston as Larry Brice
- Irene Tedrow as Miss Moritz
- Peter Bromilow as Dr. Fellman
