= Memorial Day (1983 film) =

- Genre: Drama; War
- Written by: Michael Bortman
- Directed by: Joseph Sargent
- Starring: Mike Farrell; Shelley Fabares; Keith Michell; Bonnie Bedelia; Robert Walden; Edward Herrmann
- Theme music composer: Billy Goldenberg
- Country of origin: United States
- Original language: English

Production
- Executive producer: Charles W. Fries
- Producers: Jay Benson; Mike Farrell
- Cinematography: Héctor R. Figueroa
- Editor: Thomas Fries
- Running time: 92 minutes
- Production company: Charles Fries Productions

Original release
- Network: CBS
- Release: November 27, 1983

Memorial Day is a 1983 American made-for-television war drama film directed by Joseph Sargent and starring Mike Farrell, Robert Walden, Danny Glover and Shelley Fabares. It originally premiered November 27, 1983 on CBS.

== Plot ==
Attorney Matt Walker who finds himself at the center of a surprise reunion with the veterans of his platoon from the Vietnam War, including Gibbs and Ned Larwin. The reunion stirs up painful memories and disturbing secrets for all involved.

== Cast ==
- Mike Farrell as Matt Walker
- Shelley Fabares as Ellie Walker
- Keith Michell as Marsh
- Bonnie Bedelia as Cass
- Robert Walden as Gibbs
- Edward Herrmann as Ned Larwin
- Bert Remsen as Clay Gibbs
- Alan Oppenheimer as Stallings
- Danny Glover as Willie Monroe
- Charles Cyphers as Jack Ruskin
- Jonathan Goldsmith as Banks
- Kaleena Kiff as Kara
- Tom Rosqui as Barney French
- Michael Talbott as Watney
- Robert Broyles as Preacher
