= The Borderland =

- The Outer Limits episode
- Episode no.: Season 1 Episode 12
- Directed by: Leslie Stevens
- Written by: Leslie Stevens
- Cinematography by: John M. Nickolaus
- Production code: 2
- Original air date: December 16, 1963

Guest appearances
- Philip Abbott; Gladys Cooper; Nina Foch; Barry Jones; Gene Raymond; Mark Richman; Alfred Ryder

Episode chronology
← Previous "It Crawled Out of the Woodwork"	Next → "Tourist Attraction"

"The Borderland" is an episode of the original The Outer Limits television show written and directed by Leslie Stevens. It was the second episode to be produced, and first aired on December 16, 1963, during the first season.

The storyline involves a team of scientists who use an incredibly strong magnetic field to open a door to another dimension.

== Opening narration ==
The mind of man has always longed to know what lies beyond the world we live in. Explorers have ventured into the deeps and the heights. Of these explorers some are scientists, some are mystics. Each is driven by a different purpose. The one thing they share in common is a wish to cross the Borderlands that lie beyond the Outer Limits.

== Plot ==
In an accident, Professor Ian Fraser encounters a magnetic field that reverses the form of living matter. When his hand is caught in the strong magnetic field, it is altered, becoming a mirror of itself. Realizing the importance of magnetic fields, Fraser theorizes that a much stronger magnetic field has the potential to open a door into another world.

Knowing the cost, Fraser approaches Dwight Hartley, a wealthy magnate grieving over the loss of his son. At a dinner party given by the millionaire, Fraser, his wife and colleague Eva, and another colleague watch as Mrs. Palmer, a medium, appears to contact Hartley's dead son. However, Fraser exposes her as a fraud. After Hartley angrily dismisses Palmer, Fraser reveals his discovery. Hartley appears skeptical, until Fraser shows that his left hand, the hand that had been caught in the electrical field, has now become a right hand. Hoping that Fraser's discovery might allow him to reach his dead son, Hartley agrees to support him.

With Hartley's support, the Frasers, and fellow scientist Lincoln Russel, set up power electrical equipment inside a metropolitan power plant. While experimenting on inanimate objects and small animals, Fraser is approached by Benson Sawyer, Hartley's managing director. Sawyer, who has designs on Hartley's company, insists that Fraser's discoveries should go through him. Ultimately, Fraser enters the test box, and Eva engages the field. Now within a much more powerful magnetic field, Fraser finds himself approaching what may be a boundary between his universe, and another one.

Unknown to either of them, Mrs. Palmer and her assistant Edgar Price have appeared at the power plant, and watch as Fraser's experiments proceed. Angry at Fraser for revealing Mrs. Palmer as a fraud, Price seeks to sabotage the experiment. Palmer urges caution, warning that they could be meddling in something extremely important. Price isn't dissuaded, arguing that it is Fraser who is meddling. With Fraser within the magnetic field, Price shorts one of the plant's generators, electrocuting himself in the process. With the field losing power, the boundary begins to collapse. Fraser, now trapped in the field, can see his wife, but can't hear or reach her. Not knowing if he can be heard, Fraser shouts out his observations, that the world looks transparent, and that another landscape appears superimposed over it. Fraser has no way of knowing if he is looking at a different planet, or Earth in another time. Remembering Hartley, Fraser calls out to Dion, Hartley's dead son. Hartley, overcome by emotion, also calls out to Dion. Knowing that the world is fading out to him, Fraser reaches through the field with his hand. Eva, knowing she may lose her husband into the other dimension, grasps his hand, ultimately pulling her husband back to their world, while Hartley, desperate to reach his son, enters the magnetic field in turn and is apparently vaporized. Eva, having brought her husband back, holds him tight. As she inquires about Hartley, Ian simply replies that he left to "join his son."

== Closing narration ==
There are worlds beyond and worlds within which the explorer must explore, but there is one power which seems to transcend space and time, life and death. It is a deeply human power which holds us safe and together when all other forces combine to tear us apart — we call it the power of love.

== Cast ==
- Peter Mark Richman – as Ian Fraser (credited as Mark Richman)
- Nina Foch – as Eva Fraser
- Barry Jones – as Dwight Hartley
- Philip Abbott – as Lincoln Russell
- Gene Raymond – as Benson Sawyer
- Gladys Cooper – as Mrs. Palmer
- Alfred Ryder – as Edgar Price
- Noel de Sousa – as Dr. Sung (uncredited)
- Vic Perrin – as Scientist (uncredited)

== Influence in other media ==
- The developers of the Half-Life video game series, which deals with creatures from parallel dimensions breaking through to ours, have listed "The Borderland" among their primary influences for the plot of the game.

== See also ==
- Fourth dimension in literature
- The Devil Commands
