= Snowbeast =

1977 American television film

- Promotional poster
- Genre: Horror
- Written by: Joseph Stefano
- Directed by: Herb Wallerstein
- Starring: Bo Svenson; Yvette Mimieux; Robert Logan; Clint Walker; Sylvia Sidney
- Theme music composer: Robert Prince
- Country of origin: United States
- Original language: English

Production
- Executive producer: Douglas S. Cramer
- Producer: Wilford Lloyd Baumes
- Production locations: Crested Butte, Colorado; Gunnison, Colorado
- Cinematography: Frank Stanley
- Editors: Carroll Sax; Dennis Mosher
- Running time: 86 minutes
- Production company: Douglas Cramer Productions

Original release
- Network: NBC
- Release: April 28, 1977

Snowbeast is a 1977 American made-for-television horror film starring Bo Svenson, Yvette Mimieux, Robert Logan and Clint Walker, and follows the story of a bloodthirsty Bigfoot-like monster terrorizing a ski resort in the Colorado Rockies. It was directed by Herb Wallerstein from a teleplay written by Joseph Stefano (The Outer Limits co-creator, who also wrote the screenplay for Alfred Hitchcock's 1960 thriller Psycho). The film originally premiered as the NBC Thursday Night Movie on NBC on April 28, 1977.

== Plot ==
Gar Seberg (Svenson) and his wife Ellen (Mimieux), return to his home town, a ski resort in the Colorado Rockies. Gar is a former Olympic skiing champion, and is looking for work. As they arrive, the town's annual Snow Carnival is spoiled by the disappearance of some vacationers. Resort owner Carrie Rill (Sylvia Sidney), fears losing business and tries to keep the disappearances a secret, but there are witnesses, who say that the culprit is a Yeti or Bigfoot/Sasquatch. As it is revealed that the missing people were brutally killed, the local sheriff (Walker) spreads the story that there is a lone savage bear on the loose. Carrie's grandson Tony (Logan) gives Gar a job at the resort, but also tells him that he must stalk and kill the monster. Ellen was previously in television and had worked on a documentary about Sasquatch sightings, so Gar has an open mind and is reluctant to kill the beast—until he sees the remains of the first victim. Then the monster comes to town, killing the mother of the carnival queen and sending the town into a panic.

Gar, Ellen, Tony and the sheriff go to the woods and track the monster. The creature attacks Gar, who shoots it, but the beast is still alive, so Gar picks up a ski pole and impales it, causing it to fall off the cliff and die.

== Cast ==
- Bo Svenson as Gar Seberg
- Yvette Mimieux as Ellen Seberg
- Robert Logan as Tony Rill
- Clint Walker as Sheriff Paraday
- Sylvia Sidney as Mrs. Carrie Rill
- Thomas Babson as Buster Smith
- Jacquie Botts as Betty Jo Blodgett
- Jamie Jamison as John Cochran
- Richard Jamison as Ben Cochran
- Liz Jury as Mrs. Blodgett
- Richard Jury as Charlie Braintree
- Annie McEnroe as Heidi
- Michael J. London as The Snowbeast

== Release ==
=== Home media ===
Snowbeast was released on VHS by GoodTimes Video/Entertainment in August 1987. It was released on (Blu-ray) in 2018 by Retromedia Entertainment and includes 2 versions of the film, the original version at 88 minutes and a shorter CBS Late Movie recut at 72 minutes.

== Reception ==
=== Retrospective reviews ===
Later reception for Snowbeast has been more negative, with many critics calling it a poor quality Jaws rip-off. Fred Beldin of Allmovie felt that the film was a significantly less effective take-off of Stephen Spielberg's Jaws, with the title monster not scary once it is fully revealed. Beldin concluded his review by calling the film "one of the weaker entries into an already tepid horror subgenre." Zack Handlen from The A.V. Club offered the film similar criticism, while also pointing out that director Wallerstein was not as gifted a filmmaker to enable the film to rise above being just another poor Jaws rip-off. HorrorNews.net stated that, while the film showed promise, it was undone by an over-reliance on cliches, POV shots, and ski footage. Leonard Maltin panned the film, calling it "dumb", and "below average". Blockbuster Inc.'s Guide to Movies and Videos awarded it one out of four stars, while refusing to comment about the film. In his Video Sourcebook, Thomson Gale rated the film one and a half out of four stars, stating that the film was 'neither scary or funny'.

== Sources ==
=== Books ===
- Anon. (September 1, 1994). Blockbuster Video guide to movies and videos, 1995. Dell Publishing. ISBN 978-0-440-21766-4.
- Anon. (2000). Bowker's complete video directory : the most extensive listing of currently available entertainment titles as well as education and special interest videos for home, school, and business. Vol. 1. Bowker. ISBN 978-0-8352-4308-7.
- Gale, Thomson (October 2007). Video Sourcebook: A Guide to Programs Currently Available on Video in the Areas Of: Movies/entertainment, General Interest/education, Sports/recreation, Fine Arts, Heal. Gale / Cengage Learning. ISBN 978-1-4144-0099-0.
- Maltin, Leonard (October 29, 1992). Leonard Maltin's Movie and Video Guide 1993. Penguin Group. ISBN 978-0-452-26857-9.

=== Websites ===
- Beldin, Fred. "Snowbeast (1977) - Herb Wallerstein". Allmovie.com. RhythmOne. Archived from the original on May 12, 2014.
- Handlen, Zack (June 30, 2009). "Snowbeast". AVClub.com. The A.V. Club.
- Honeybone, Nigel (September 7, 2010). "Film Review: Snowbeast (1977)". HorrorNews.net. HorrorNews. Archived from the original on November 15, 2010.
