= Two Bits =

1995 film

- Theatrical release poster
- Directed by: James Foley
- Written by: Joseph Stefano
- Produced by: Arthur Cohn
- Starring: Jerry Barone; Mary Elizabeth Mastrantonio; Al Pacino
- Cinematography: Juan Ruiz Anchía
- Edited by: Howard E. Smith
- Music by: Carter Burwell
- Production company: Connexion Film
- Distributed by: Miramax Films (Domestic); Capella International (Overseas)
- Release date: November 22, 1995
- Running time: 85 minutes
- Country: United States
- Language: English
- Box office: $26,282

Two Bits is a 1995 American drama film directed by James Foley and starring Al Pacino, Mary Elizabeth Mastrantonio and Jerry Barone. It is written by Joseph Stefano, who considered the film a personal project, with a semi-biographical story. The title refers to the American slang term for a quarter dollar: "two bits".

== Plot ==
It is a hot summer day in 1933 in South Philadelphia, where 12-year-old Gennaro lives with his widowed mother and ailing grandfather. His grandfather sits outside holding on tight to his last quarter. He has promised the quarter to Gennaro so that the boy can buy a ticket to a plush new movie theater. However, grandpa is not ready to pass on the quarter, nor is he ready to die. He has some unfinished business with Guendolina, a woman from his past, and he enlists Gennaro to act as his emissary.

== Cast ==
- Jerry Barone as Gennaro
  - Alec Baldwin as Narrator (Older Gennaro) (voice) (uncredited)
- Mary Elizabeth Mastrantonio as Luisa Spirito
- Al Pacino as Grandpa
- Patrick Borriello as Tullio
- Andy Romano as Dr. Bruna
- Donna Mitchell as Mrs. Bruna
- Mary Lou Rosato as Aunt Carmela
- Joe Grifasi as Uncle Joe
- Rosemary De Angelis as Mrs. Conte
- Ron McLarty as Irish
- Charley Scalies as Ballyhoo Driver
- Joanna Merlin as Guendolina
- Geoff Pierson as Dr. Wilson
- Karen Shallo as Woman in Red
- Nick Discenza as Father of Deceased

== Reception ==
On the review aggregator website Rotten Tomatoes, 40% of 10 critics' reviews are positive.

=== Awards ===
The film was nominated for two Young Artist Awards: Best Family Feature and Best Young Leading Actor (Jerry Barone) at the 17th Youth in Film Awards.
