= Tourist Attraction (The Outer Limits) =

- The Outer Limits episode
- Episode no.: Season 1 Episode 13
- Directed by: Laslo Benedek
- Written by: Dean Riesner
- Cinematography by: John M. Nickolaus Jr.
- Production code: 4
- Original air date: December 23, 1963

Guest appearances
- Janet Blair – Lynn Arthur; Henry Silva – General Juan Mercurio; Ralph Meeker – John Dexter

Episode chronology
← Previous "The Borderland"	Next → "The Zanti Misfits"

"Tourist Attraction" is an episode of the original The Outer Limits television show. It first aired on December 23, 1963, during the first season.

== Plot ==
Domineering millionaire John Dexter drives a group of explorers and scientists to pursue an ancient lake monster that is reputed to live in the waters of a South American dictatorship. Using underwater detection equipment aboard Dexter's yacht, they spot the creature swimming along the lake bed. After several attempts, the creature is captured and taken to the local university for study.

The creature is immobilized and stored inside a freezer to aid in its preservation while out of water. Meanwhile, Dexter makes plans to transport it to the United States to place it on display. San Blas' absolute ruler, Juan Mercurio, has his own plans to use it to attract tourists to his country's faltering World's Fair, claiming the animal as a national treasure. During its captivity, the creature is revived due to an inept guard's negligence, and emits ultrasonic waves that cause the freezer door to implode. It is recaptured before it can fully escape its confines, and an armed guard from Mercurio's palace is ordered to stand watch. Dexter overpowers him, and arranges for the creature's transport on his private plane back to the States.

As Dexter and his assistants prepare the monster for its trip, they are shocked to see more of the creatures emerging from the lake. A marine biologist, previously employed by Dexter, urges them to turn the creature loose. Reluctantly, they comply, watching as it joins the others. Dexter, shooting at the creatures in an effort to stop them, is abruptly halted by a piercing, ultrasonic pulse. The creatures crawl back into the lake and disappear under the water. With the combined energy of their earth-shattering sound waves, the creatures topple the dam created by Mercurio during his reign of power, killing him, and flooding San Blas, destroying all that he had built.

== Production and broadcast ==
Unlike the other episodes of the series, "Tourist Attraction" has two additional narrations, one during Act I and another in Act IV. This episode was originally scheduled to air on November 25, 1963, two days after the assassination of John F. Kennedy. As happened with almost all regularly scheduled US network programming in the days following the Kennedy assassination, this episode was postponed. However, rather than move it to the following week of December 2 (when new episodes of The Outer Limits resumed broadcasting), "Tourist Attraction" aired on December 23, 1963.

== Cast ==
- Ralph Meeker as John Dexter
- Henry Silva as General Juan Mercurio
- Janet Blair as Lynn Arthur
- Jerry Douglas as Tom Evans
- Henry Darrow as Mario
- Jay Novello as Prof. Arivello
- Edward Colmans as Reporter #1
- Willard Sage as Reporter #2
- Stuart Lancaster as Skipper
- Jon Silo as Oswaldo
- Shelley Morrison as the Woman
- Martin Garralaga as Paco
- Francis Ravel as Fortunato
- Noel de Sousa as Man
- Marco Antonio as Butler
- Roger Stern as Ichthyosaurus Mercurius #1
- Paul Stader as Ichthyosaurus Mercurius #2
- George Robotham as Ichthyosaurus Mercurius #3
