= Judy Farrell =

American actress (1938–2023)

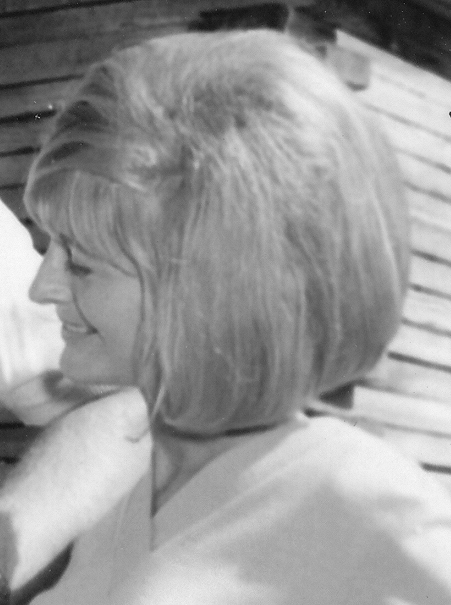
- Farrell at Knott's Berry Farm in 1966
- Born: Judy Hayden; May 11, 1938; Quapaw, Oklahoma, U.S.
- Died: April 2, 2023 (aged 84); Los Angeles, California, U.S.
- Occupations: Actress, writer
- Years active: 1961–2006
- Spouses: Mike Farrell (m. 1963; div. 1983) Joe Bratcher (m. 1985)
- Children: 2

Judy Farrell (née Hayden; May 11, 1938 – April 2, 2023) was an American actress who may be best known for eight appearances, sporadically over five seasons, as Nurse Able on the television comedy series M*A*S*H, during the time that her then-husband Mike Farrell was in the main cast. She performed small roles in several other television series, then later wrote 13 episodes for the soap opera Port Charles.

== Life and career ==
Judy Hayden was born and raised in Quapaw, Oklahoma. She graduated from Oklahoma State University with a fine arts degree in theater.

While studying for a master's degree at UCLA in 1961, she met actor Mike Farrell. She worked as a high-school English and drama teacher at Laguna Beach High School in Laguna Beach, California. In August 1963, she married Farrell, with whom she subsequently had two children, Erin and Michael. In the 1960s, Farrell and she performed together at the Laguna Playhouse. They divorced in the early 1980s.

The Farrells' marriage was worked into the script of one episode of M*A*S*H: In the episode "The Colonel's Horse," Mike's character B.J. Hunnicutt said his wife Peg (played by Catherine Bergstrom in two onscreen appearances and a few photographs) was from Judy's hometown of Quapaw, and that her father's name was Floyd Hayden. His daughter in the show was also named Erin, as is his real-life daughter. she died in 2023 of pneumonia at age 84.

== Filmography ==
Year	Title	Role	Notes
1971	The Andromeda Strain	Pam	Uncredited
1971	J. W. Coop	Barmaid	
1976	M*A*S*H	Nurse Able	TV Series, 8 episodes
1979	Chapter Two	Gwen Michaels	
2006	Long-Term Relationship	Diane Harris	(final film role)
