= The Zanti Misfits =

- The Outer Limits episode
- Episode no.: Season 1 Episode 14
- Directed by: Leonard Horn
- Written by: Joseph Stefano
- Cinematography by: John M. Nickolaus
- Production code: 17
- Original air date: December 30, 1963

Guest appearances
- Michael Tolan; Olive Deering; Robert F. Simon; Bruce Dern; Claude Woolman

Episode chronology
← Previous "Tourist Attraction"	Next → "The Mice"

"The Zanti Misfits" is an episode of the original The Outer Limits television show. It was first broadcast during its first season, on December 30, 1963. In 1997, TV Guide ranked this episode number 98 on its "100 Greatest Episodes of All Time" list of all US television.

== Plot ==
Military forces have cordoned off the ghost town of Morgue in a remote section in the deserts of California while awaiting the arrival of a spacecraft from the planet Zanti. The perfectionist rulers of that planet, after making radio contact with our government, have decided that the Earth is the "perfect place" to exile their undesirables and criminals in exchange for sharing technological advances with Earth. They threaten total destruction if their penal ship is attacked, or if their privacy is not maintained.

During the negotiations, Ben Garth, a bank robber on the run, and his reluctant, morally deficient accomplice and girlfriend, Lisa, cross the cordon, and run down an armed sentry during the approach of the Zanti ship. After seeing the ship land, Ben climbs a small mesa to investigate the landing site. A Zanti regent emerges from an open hatch of the ship and kills him. The Zanti are revealed to be grotesque oversized ant-like beings with malicious human-like faces. The Zanti regent pursues Lisa.

Believing that their privacy was violated, the remaining Zanti prisoners commandeer the penal ship and land it atop the roof of the military command post. When the Zanti prisoners attack Earth's nervous soldiers, a brutal firefight ensues, and all of the aliens are massacred. The soldiers and airmen anxiously await the expected reprisal, but, instead, they receive a message of thanks from the Zanti leaders who explain that they were incapable of executing members of their own species so they sent them into the hands of a race who possessed no qualms about killing — the human race, referring to us as "practiced executioners".

== Special effects ==
Jim Danforth provided the stop-motion effects of the Zantis for this episode.

During the Zantis' initial attack after landing on the roof of the command post, the creatures are seen descending an exterior wall; however, with the technology of the time, the stop-motion effect was not able to be used during this scene. Here, the Zantis are mere models being lowered on wires, their movements erratic, with their legs not moving.

== Contemporary usage ==
"Zantis" and "Zanti Misfits" have been used to describe certain patterns of extremely high-frequency stock trading.

== In popular culture ==
In 1983 The Turtles released an EP titled The Rhythm Butchers Vs. The Zanti Misfits.

Frank Zappa released a piece titled Zanti Serenade on the 1992 album Playground Psychotics.

Synth-pop band Information Society sampled this episode on their songs "Still Here" and "Strength".

In the Space Ghost Coast To Coast episode "Banjo", Zorak chants in the Zanti language when attempting to hypnotize Space Ghost using a book he read.

== Cast ==
- Michael Tolan – as Steve Grave
- Olive Deering – as Lisa
- Robert F. Simon – as General Hart
- Bruce Dern – as Ben Garth
- Claude Woolman – as Major Roger Hill
- Lex Johnson – as a communications technician (uncredited)
- Joe E. Tata – as a radar operator (uncredited)
- George Sims – as a computer technician (uncredited)
- Mike Mikler – as Air Police sergeant (uncredited)
- Bill Hart – as Corporal Delano (uncredited)
- Vic Perrin – as the voice of Zanti prisoner (uncredited)
- Robert Johnson – as the voices of radio newscaster / Zanti Regent / Zanti commander (uncredited)
- John Elizalde – as voice of the Zanti (uncredited)
