= Don't Open Till Doomsday =

- The Outer Limits episode
- Episode no.: Season 1 Episode 17
- Directed by: Gerd Oswald
- Written by: Joseph Stefano
- Cinematography by: Conrad Hall
- Production code: 22
- Original air date: January 20, 1964

Guest appearances
- Miriam Hopkins; John Hoyt; Russell Collins; Buck Taylor; Nellie Burt

Episode chronology
← Previous "Controlled Experiment"	Next → "ZZZZZ"

"Don't Open Till Doomsday" is an episode of the original The Outer Limits television show. It first aired on January 20, 1964, during the first season.

== Opening narration ==
"The greatness of evil lies in its awful accuracy. Without that deadly talent for being in the right place at the right time, evil must suffer defeat. For unlike its opposite, good, evil is allowed no human failings, no miscalculations. Evil must be perfect, or depend upon the imperfections of others."

== Plot ==
In 1929, a pair of young newlyweds receives a mysterious box-like object wrapped as a wedding gift with a cryptic label reading "Don't Open Till Doomsday". Unbeknownst to his bride, the bridegroom is zapped by a beam of light emanating from this object when he removed it from the wrapping, and seemingly disappears out of existence. Thirty-five years later, in 1964, an eloping couple arrives at the house in the hopes of using it as a honeymoon spot, now a half-derelict mansion owned by Mrs. Kry, an eccentric old woman who turns out to be the aforesaid bride, driven to insanity after her husband disappeared. After the new bride herself disappears inside the box, it is revealed that Mrs. Kry has been luring young couples to her house, in the hope of "trading" them for her lost bridegroom who, with an alien intelligence, is still residing inside the box. Later, the young bride's father arrives on location to take his wayward daughter back with him, and is also abducted by the alien, finding himself inside the box — actually, a pocket dimension occupied by an amorphous, one-eyed creature from an anti-matter universe, who is bent on destroying our universe. The father, his daughter and Mrs. Kry's lost bridegroom are there, as well. The creature, having become lost during his journey between dimensions, addresses them, assuring them they'll be freed on the condition that they help him to achieve his goal — reuniting him with his eight other companions, all of whom were inhabitants of their universe, each carrying an essential element which, when joined, would result in the annihilation of our universe. Facing refusal, and being further hindered by an angered Mrs. Kry, along with the father's false promise to aid in the search if freed from captivity, the enraged alien resorts to self-destruction after setting the daughter free, thus 'uncreating' himself, and obliterating the entire mansion, the father, Mrs. Kry and her bridegroom in the process, with the young couple narrowly escaping the carnage.

== Closing narration ==
"Without that deadly talent for being in the right place at the right time, evil must suffer defeat; and with each defeat, doomsday is postponed for at least one more day."

== Cast ==
- Miriam Hopkins as Mary Kry
- David Frankham as Harvey Kry
- John Hoyt as Emmett Balfour
- Buck Taylor as Gard Hayden
- Melinda Plowman as Vivia Balfour Hayden
- Russell Collins as Justice of the Peace
- Nellie Burt as Wife
- Anthony Jochim as Mordecai Spazman
- Frank Delfino as Creature (uncredited)
- Robert Johnson as voice of Creature (uncredited)
