= Joseph Stefano =

American screenwriter and producer (1922–2006)

- Born: Joseph William Stefano; May 5, 1922; Philadelphia, Pennsylvania, U.S.
- Died: August 25, 2006 (aged 84); Thousand Oaks, California, U.S.
- Occupations: Screenwriter, film producer, television producer, composer
- Spouse: Marilyn Epstein (m. 1954)

Joseph William Stefano (May 5, 1922 – August 25, 2006) was an American screenwriter, television and film producer, and music composer. He was best known for writing Alfred Hitchcock's film Psycho (1960), and for his contributions to the anthology television series The Outer Limits (1963–64).

== Early years ==
Of Italian descent, Stefano was born in Philadelphia to a father who was a tailor and a mother who made silk flowers. As a teenager, Stefano was so keen to become an actor that he dropped out of high school two weeks before graduation and traveled to New York City, where he adopted the stage name "Jerry Stevens".

=== Music ===
Stefano's initial career was as a composer of pop music in the 1940s, writing songs for Las Vegas showman Donn Arden. In possession of a large collection of sheet music, he once spent five hours challenging pianist Michael Feinstein on the titles of obscure Tin Pan Alley songs.

He has writing credits on songs by Joe Reisman ("Day Dream"), the George Shearing Quintet ("Wonder Struck"), and Jack Pleis ("Serenade in Soft Shoe").

== Career ==
Stefano began writing movie scripts in the late 1950s. His first produced screenplay was The Black Orchid (1959) for director Martin Ritt; his mother's occupation was an influence on the screenplay.

=== Psycho ===
Stefano was commissioned by Alfred Hitchcock to adapt Robert Bloch's novel Psycho (1960) for his film version. His work was recognized by the Mystery Writers of America when he was given a 1961 Edgar Award, for Best Motion Picture Screenplay. Stefano appears briefly onscreen, discussing Bloch's utilization of the basis of the character Norman Bates in the crimes of serial killer Ed Gein, in the documentary Ed Gein: The Ghoul of Plainfield, which can be found on Disc 2 of the DVD release of the remake of The Texas Chainsaw Massacre (2003).

=== The Outer Limits ===
Stefano was offered the task of scripting Hitchcock's The Birds (1963) and Marnie (1964), but was already committed to produce and write for his friend Leslie Stevens' science fiction television anthology series The Outer Limits. Both Stefano and Stevens were involved only during the first season of the show. In the book Writing with Hitchcock, Stefano said that Hitchcock held a grudge over his being unavailable to write the screenplay for Marnie.

Stefano wrote a total of 12 episodes. They are:

- "Nightmare"
- "It Crawled Out of the Woodwork"
- "The Zanti Misfits"
- "The Mice" (teleplay)
- "Don't Open Till Doomsday"
- "The Invisibles"
- "The Bellero Shield" (story & teleplay)
- "Moonstone" (story)
- "Fun and Games" (teleplay)
- "A Feasibility Study"
- "The Chameleon" (story)
- "The Forms of Things Unknown"

The last episode was originally a pilot for a proposed TV series called The Unknown, but after ABC rejected it, Stefano reworked it as the season one finale.

=== Subsequent works ===
After leaving The Outer Limits due to network interference and exhaustion, Stefano wrote, produced and directed The Ghost of Sierra de Cobre (1964; aka The Haunted), a film using many of the crew responsible for The Outer Limits. The thriller Eye of the Cat (1969) and the comedy Futz (1969) were Stefano's last big-screen work for many years. Throughout the 1970s, he wrote many television films such as Revenge! (1971), A Death of Innocence (1971), Home for the Holidays (1972), Live Again, Die Again (1974), Aloha Means Goodbye (1974) and Snowbeast (1977). Stefano also wrote one episode for the first season of Star Trek: The Next Generation (1988) entitled "Skin of Evil". Stefano was one of the guests of honor at the 1974 NY Telefantasy Convention (along with Noel Neill, Jim Danforth and William Tuttle), and spent hours signing autographs for hundreds of Outer Limits fans. At the show, he expressed his surprise that so many people still remembered the series almost a decade after its cancellation.

In 1990, he revisited the characters from Psycho with the TV movie script for the prequel, in what he believed had become an increasingly disappointing series of films. Psycho IV: The Beginning (1990) posits the origins of Norman Bates' destructive mother-love, featuring Olivia Hussey as Mrs. Bates. Stefano wrote and executive produced the Al Pacino drama Two Bits (1995), a personal project that fared poorly at the box-office and with critics, leaving Stefano less than enthusiastic about continuing to write for modern Hollywood. Gus Van Sant's remake of Psycho (1998) followed Stefano's script punctiliously.

== Death ==
Stefano died of a heart attack at Los Robles Hospital in Thousand Oaks, California, in 2006.

== Media portrayals ==
In the biopic Hitchcock (2012), based on the book Alfred Hitchcock and the Making of Psycho by Stephen Rebello, Stefano is portrayed by Ralph Macchio.

== Filmography ==
=== Film ===
Year	Title	Functioned as		Director	Notes
Year	Title	Writer	Producer	Director	Notes
1959	The Black Orchid	Yes	No	Martin Ritt	
1960	Psycho	Yes	No	Alfred Hitchcock	
1961	The Naked Edge	Yes	No	Michael Anderson	
1969	Eye of the Cat	Yes	No	David Lowell Rich	
1969	Futz	Yes	No	Tom O'Horgan	
1987	The Kindred	Yes	No	Jeffrey Obrow; Stephen Carpenter	Co-writer with Obrow, Carpenter, John Penney and Earl Ghaffari
1988	Blackout	Yes	Yes	Doug Adams	Co-writer with Laura Ferguson
1995	Two Bits	Yes	Executive	James Foley	
1998	Psycho	Yes	No	Gus Van Sant	Based on his 1960 screenplay

=== Television ===
Year	Title	Functioned as		Notes
Year	Title	Writer	Producer	Notes
1958	Playhouse 90	Story	No	Episode "Made in Japan"
1959	General Electric Theater	Yes	No	Episodes "Hitler's Secret" and "The Committeeman"
1960	Startime	Yes	No	Episode "The Young Juggler"
1960	The Detectives	Yes	No	3 episodes
1962	Saints and Sinners	Yes	No	Episode "Source of Information"
1963	The Lloyd Bridges Show	Yes	No	Episode "A Game for Alternate Mondays"
1963	Mr. Novak	Yes	No	Episode "First Year, First Day"
1963–64	The Outer Limits	Yes	Yes	Writer (12 episodes); Producer (32 episodes)
1971	Marcus Welby, M.D.	Yes	No	Episode "False Spring"
1973	The Magician	Story	No	Episode "Pilot"
1988	Star Trek: The Next Generation	Yes	No	Episode "Skin of Evil"
1990	Swamp Thing	Yes	Yes	Developed by Writer (2 episodes); Supervising producer (13 episodes)
1995–2001	The Outer Limits	No	No	Revival of 1963 series Executive consultant (84 episodes)

TV movies, miniseries, and specials

Year	Title	Functioned as		Notes
Year	Title	Writer	Producer	Notes
1964	The Ghost of Sierra de Cobre	Yes	Yes	Also director
1971	Revenge!	Yes	No	
1971	A Death of Innocence	Yes	No	
1972	Home for the Holidays	Yes	No	
1974	Live Again, Die Again	Yes	No	
1974	Aloha Means Goodbye	Yes	No	
1977	Snowbeast	Yes	No	
1990	Psycho IV: The Beginning	Yes	No	

== Awards and nominations ==
Institution	Year	Category	Work	Result
Edgar Awards	1961	Best Motion Picture Screenplay	Psycho (1960)	Won
Saturn Awards	1987	President's Award	—N/a	Won
Saturn Awards	1999	Best Writing	Psycho (1998)	Nominated
Writers Guild of America	1961	Best Written American Drama	Psycho (1960)	Nominated
