= Mike Farrell =

American actor (born 1939)

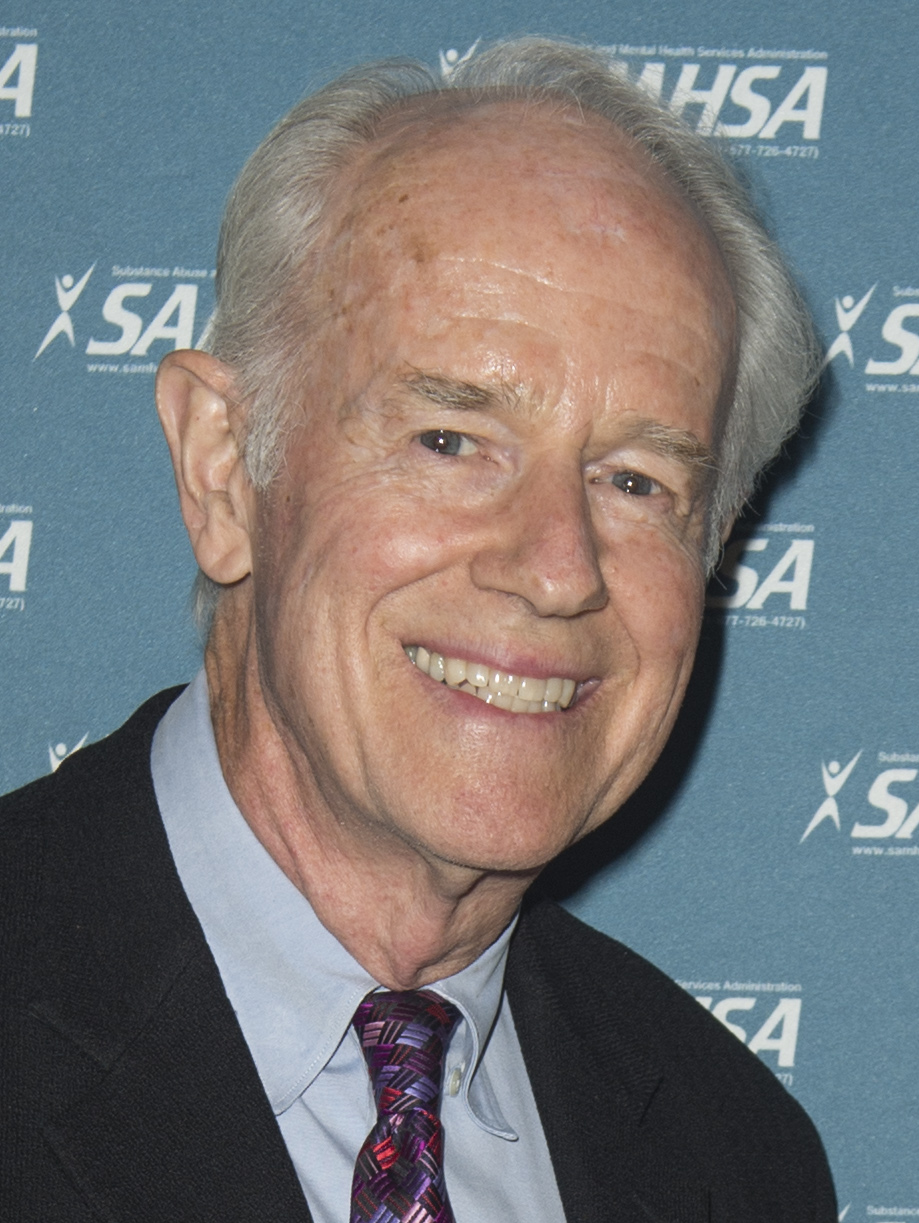
- Farrell in 2016
- Born: Michael Joseph Farrell Jr. February 6, 1939 (age 87); South St. Paul, Minnesota, U.S.
- Occupations: Actor; director; producer; screenwriter; activist; public speaker
- Years active: 1963–present
- Spouses: Judy Hayden (m. 1963; div. 1983) Shelley Fabares (m. 1984; died 2026)
- Children: 2
- Military career
- Allegiance: United States
- Branch: United States Marine Corps
- Service years: 1957–1959
- Rank: Private First Class
- Unit: 3rd Marine Division

Michael Joseph Farrell Jr. (born February 6, 1939) is an American actor, best known for his role as Captain B.J. Hunnicutt on the television series M*A*S*H (1975–1983). In addition, Farrell was a producer of Patch Adams (1998) starring Robin Williams, and he starred in the television series Providence (1999–2002).

Farrell is also an activist and public speaker for various political causes. He has been the President of Death Penalty Focus since 1994. He is a long-time opponent of the death penalty, and has helped raise defense funds for inmates he believes are innocent.

== Early life ==
Farrell, one of four children, was born in South St. Paul, Minnesota, the son of Agnes Sarah Cosgrove and Michael Joseph Farrell.

When he was two years old, his family moved from South St. Paul to Hollywood, California, where his father worked as a carpenter on film sets. Farrell attended West Hollywood Grammar School in the same class as fellow actor Natalie Wood, and graduated from Hollywood High School. He served in the United States Marine Corps from 1957 to 1959. After being discharged, he worked at various jobs before becoming an actor.

== Acting career ==
=== Early career ===
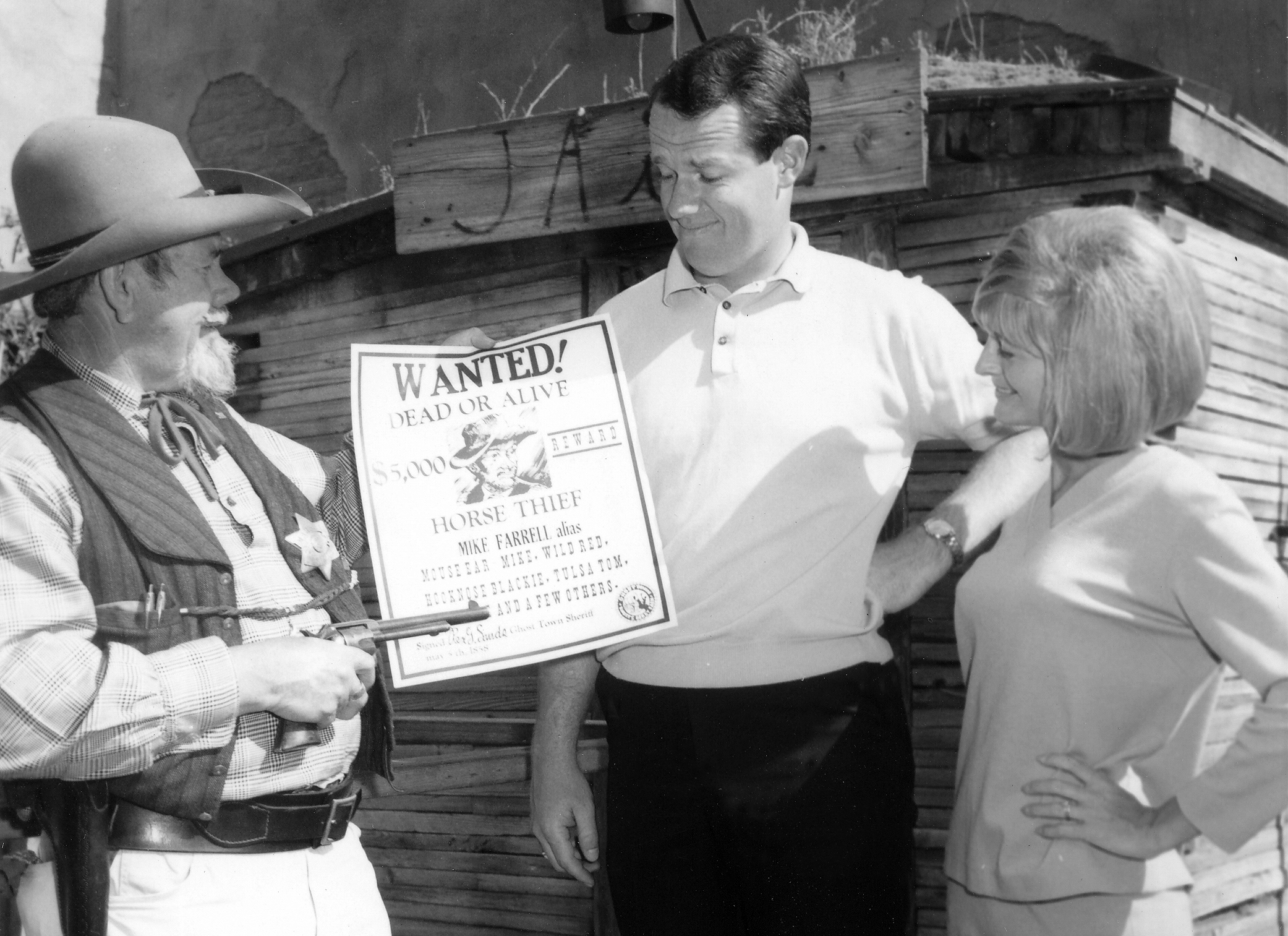
Farrell and Judy Farrell at Knott's Berry Farm in 1966

During the 1960s, Farrell guest-starred in a few series. Notable roles included playing a young US Forest Service ranger in the Lassie episode "Never Look Back" (February 1967); Federal Agent Modell in the episode "Monkee Chow Mein" on The Monkees in 1967; as a bellhop (uncredited) in The Graduate in 1967; astronaut Arland in the episode "Genie, Genie, Who's Got the Genie?" on I Dream of Jeannie; an Army doctor in the episode "The Bankroll" of Combat!; and an ex-high school friend turned famous actor of Chet Kincaid in The Bill Cosby Show.

In 1968, Farrell originated the continuing role of Scott Banning in the NBC soap opera Days of Our Lives. In 1969 he played a caring elders quorum president for The Church of Jesus Christ of Latter-day Saints in the Brigham Young University-produced short Worthy to Stand, in which his wife Judy also had her first film appearance. In 1970, he starred as one of the young doctors in the CBS prime-time series The Interns, in a cast led by Broderick Crawford. In 1971, he played the assistant to Anthony Quinn in ABC's The Man and the City. In 1973, while under contract to Universal Studios, Farrell starred with Robert Foxworth in The Questor Tapes. During the years under contract, he guest-starred in a number of shows, including Banacek; Mannix; Marcus Welby, M.D.; The Six Million Dollar Man; and The New Land; and starred in a television pilot with Jane Wyman, which did not sell.

In the early 1970s, Farrell guest-starred in the television Western drama Bonanza and did a number of commercials as a spokesman for Standard Oil of Indiana (later Amoco), Maytag dryers, Butter-Nut coffee, and Plymouth automobiles, among other products.

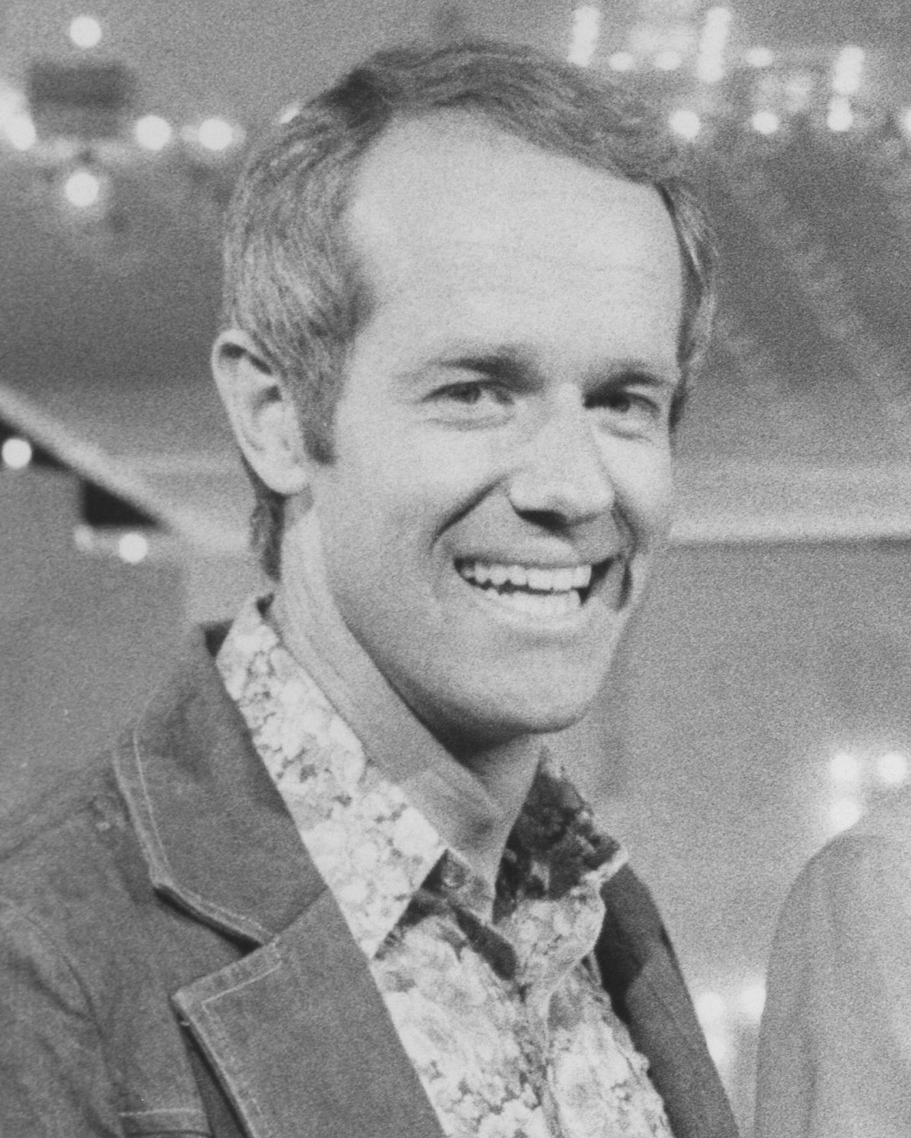
Farrell on Stumpers! in 1976

=== M*A*S*H (1975–83) and later roles ===
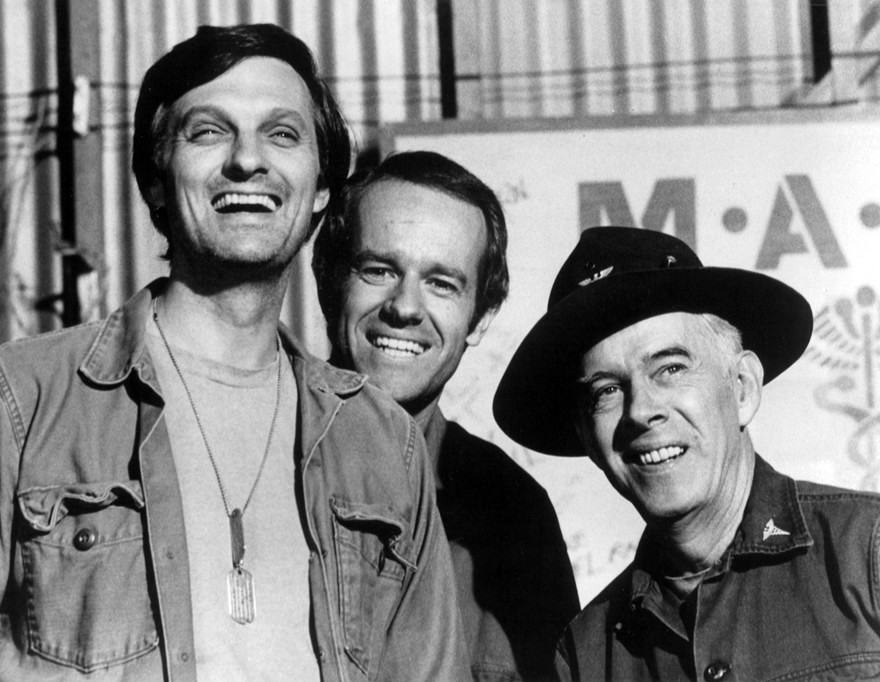
As B.J. in M*A*S*H with Alan Alda (left) and Harry Morgan (right).

Farrell's big break came in 1975 when Wayne Rogers departed M*A*S*H between the third and fourth season. Farrell was recruited for the newly created role of B.J. Hunnicutt, along with series lead Harry Morgan, who was already signed to replace McLean Stevenson for the fourth season. Farrell won the part of B.J. over two other finalists for the role, Alan Fudge and James Cromwell (both of whom guest-starred in the series subsequently). Farrell stayed with M*A*S*H for its remaining eight years on the air. During that time, he wrote five episodes and directed four. Farrell's then-wife, actress Judy Farrell, appeared eight times in the series as Nurse Able.

Since M*A*S*H, Farrell has guest-starred in Murder, She Wrote; Justice League; Desperate Housewives; and many others. Farrell voiced Jonathan Kent in Superman: The Animated Series (1996) with wife Shelley Fabares voicing Martha Kent.

Farrell hosted several National Geographic Presents specials and starred in a number of television films, including 1983's Memorial Day, which he co-produced. He did two one-man shows: JFK, a One Man Show for PBS and, on stage, a national tour of David W. Rintels' play Clarence Darrow.

In 1985, Farrell partnered with film and television producer Marvin Minoff to create Farrell/Minoff Productions, a production company. Together, Farrell and Minoff produced numerous television films. In 1986, the company had signed a deal with The Walt Disney Studios wherein the Farrell/Minoff company would develop motion pictures and television properties.

Farrell and Minoff executive-produced Dominick and Eugene, a 1988 Orion Pictures film that earned actor Tom Hulce a Golden Globe nomination for best actor. The pair also produced 1998's Patch Adams, starring Robin Williams. Farrell and Minoff's partnership lasted more than 25 years until Minoff's death in November 2009.

=== Providence (1999–2002) ===
In 1999, Farrell was cast as veterinarian Jim Hansen, the father of the lead character Dr. Sydney Hansen, portrayed by Melina Kanakaredes, on the NBC-TV melodrama series Providence. In his portrayal of Sydney's father, Farrell played opposite Concetta Tomei, who portrayed his wife, Lynda Hansen. Tomei's character died during the first episode of the series, but continued to appear as a ghost/memory in vignettes of later episodes. Farrell appeared in 64 of the show's 96 episodes.

Farrell appeared as Milton Lang, the father of Victor Lang (John Slattery), husband of Gabrielle Solis (Eva Longoria), on Desperate Housewives during the 2007–08 season.

Farrell was seen in the season 10 episode "Persona" of Law & Order: Special Victims Unit. He appeared as the character Fred Jones in the season 8 episode "Hunteri Heroici" of Supernatural. In 2014 he was a supporting cast member on the Sundance TV Network criminal drama series The Red Road. He portrayed Lee Miglin, a real estate baron who fell victim to serial killer Andrew Cunanan, in FX's anthology series American Crime Story: The Assassination of Gianni Versace. Most recently, he appeared in NCIS, playing the role of Judge Miles Deakin in the episodes "Judge, Jury..." and "...and Executioner."

== Activism ==
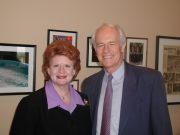
Farrell and Senator Debbie Stabenow in 2002.

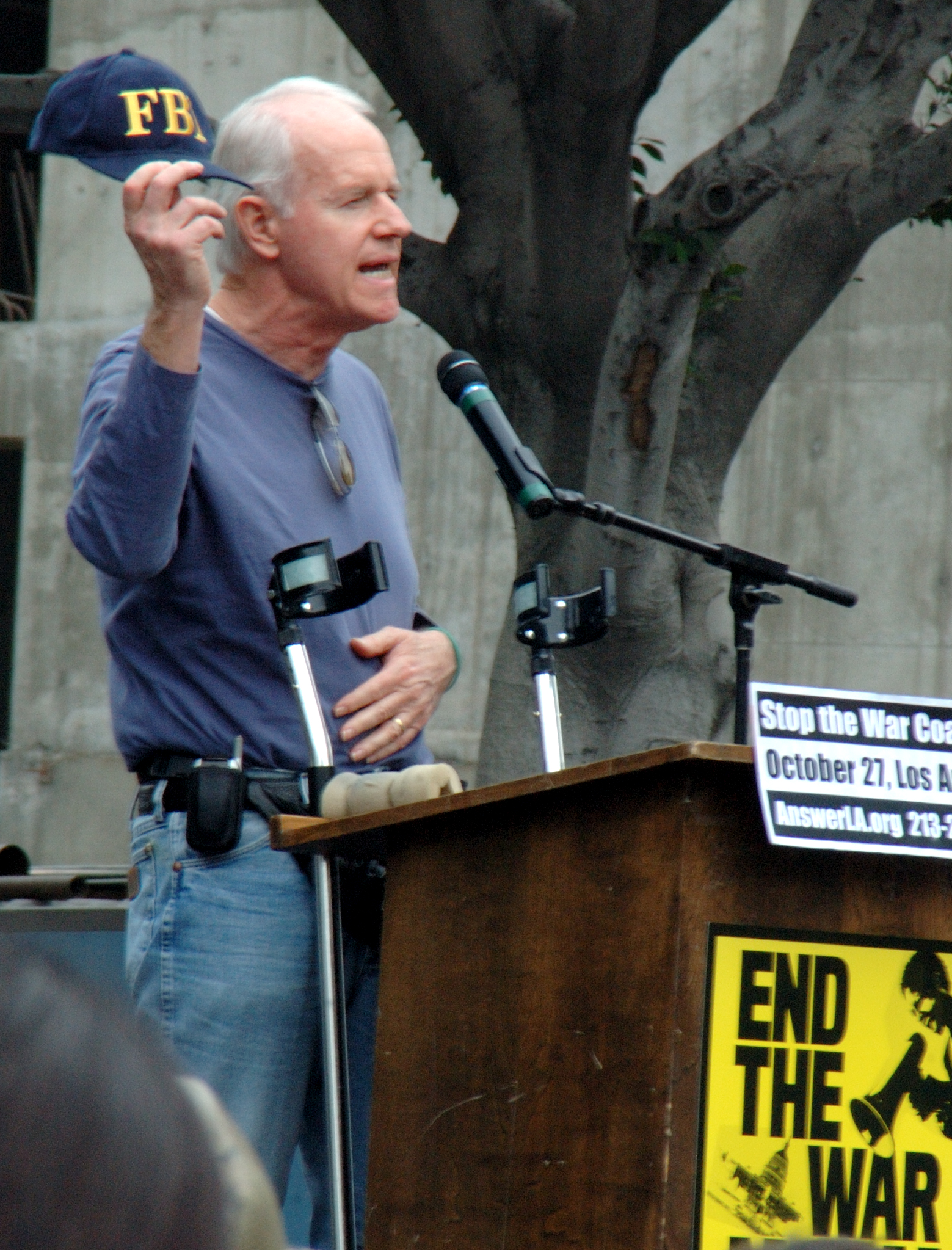
Farrell has worked on many activist campaigns.

Even before he was well-known, Farrell was an activist for many political and social causes. He was co-chair of the California Human Rights Watch for ten years, was on the Board of Advisors of the original Cult Awareness Network, and has been president of Death Penalty Focus for more than 10 years, being the first person to be awarded its Human Rights Award, subsequently named after him in 2006. He received PETA's Humanitarian Award in 2001 and narrated a public service campaign for them about animal abuse.

In 1985, Farrell was in Central America, helping refugees from the civil war in El Salvador. A guerrilla commander, Nidia Diaz, had been taken prisoner. She needed surgery, but no Salvadoran doctor would help her, so Medical Aid for El Salvador recruited a foreign doctor. Farrell was present as an observer for Amnesty International but was, in his words, "shanghaied into assisting with the surgery" when the doctor said his help was needed. The in-prison surgery was successful, and Diaz went on to be one of the signatories of the Chapultepec Peace Accords, the peace treaty ending the war.

Farrell has been active in the Screen Actors Guild. In 2002 he was elected first vice president of the Guild in Los Angeles and served in the post for three years.

In 2006, Farrell appeared with Jello Biafra and Keith Gordon in the documentary Whose War?, examining the U.S. role in the Iraq War. He also served on the advisory board of the Military Religious Freedom Foundation.

In 2014, Farrell workshopped a play by George Shea that brought Charles David Keeling and his scientific work on atmospheric CO_{2} emissions to life.

In 2016, after the US presidential election of Donald Trump, Farrell appeared in a commercial to urge Republican electors to block Trump from becoming president by having 37 electors vote for John Kasich instead.

== Publications ==
Farrell wrote an autobiography, Just Call Me Mike: A Journey to Actor and Activist (Akashic Books, ISBN 978-1-9333-5448-4), published in 2007. The book covers his working-class childhood in West Hollywood, his break into show business, his personal life, and his increasing involvement in politics and the human rights movement in the United States, Cambodia, and Latin America. His second book, Of Mule and Man (2009, Akashic Books, ISBN 1-9333-5475-5), is a journal of his five-week, 9,000-mile drive around the U.S. to promote the paperback edition of his first book.

== Personal life ==
In 1963, Farrell married actress Judy Hayden, who was working as a high school English and drama teacher in Laguna Beach, California. They separated in 1980 and divorced in 1983. They have two children.

He married actress Shelley Fabares in 1984; they remained married until her death in 2026.

== Selected filmography ==
=== Film ===
Year	Title	Role	Notes
1963	Captain Newman, M.D.	Patient	Uncredited
1966	The Year of 53 Weeks (USAF Training Film)	Captain Ralph Kendall, T-38 Instructor Pilot	Uncredited
1967	Countdown	Houston Engineer	Uncredited
1967	The Graduate	Bellhop in Hotel Lobby	Uncredited
1968	Panic in the City	Dick Blaine	Credited as Michael Farrell
1968	Targets	Man in Phonebooth	
1968	Dayton's Devils	Voucher Captain	
1969	Worthy to Stand	Fred Washburn	Short film
1976	Doomsday Machine	1st Reporter	
1981	El Salvador: Another Vietnam	Narrator	
1983	Citizen: The Political Life of Allard K. Lowenstein	—N/a	Executive producer
1988	Dominick and Eugene	—N/a	Producer
1990	Lockdown	Prentis	
1995	The Killers Within	Congressman Clayton	
1996	Hanged on a Twisted Cross	Dietrich Bonhoeffer	
1998	Patch Adams	—N/a	Producer
2006	Superman: Brainiac Attacks	Jonathan Kent (voice)	Direct-to-video
2007	Out at the Wedding	Father of the Bride	

=== Television ===
Year	Title	Role	Notes
1963	The Dick Powell Theatre	Young Couple Boy	Credited as Michael Farrell
1963	McHale's Navy	The Gunner	Episode: "Washing Machine Charlie"
1963	Ensign O'Toole	Ferguson	Episode: "Operation: Physical"
1966	Combat!	Doctor	Episode: "The Bankroll"
1967	The Monkees	Agent Modell	Episode: "Monkee Chow Mein"
1967	Iron Horse	Debuy	Episode: "The Return of Hode Avery"; uncredited
1967	Custer	First Trooper	Episode: "Desperate Mission"
1967	Garrison's Gorillas	The Captain	Episode: "Black Market"
1967–1969	Lassie	Ranger / Joe	3 episodes
1967–1974	Ironside	Len Parsons / Bellhop	2 episodes
1968	I Dream of Jeannie	Astronaut Arland	Episode: "Genie, Genie, Who's Got the Genie: Part 3"
1968	Daniel Boone	Johnson	Episode: "The Spanish Fort"
1968	Judd for the Defense	Police Lieutenant / Employment Clerk	2 episodes
1968	This Is the Life	unknown role	Episode: "Happiness is Dirty Hands"
1968–1970	Days of Our Lives	Scott Banning	Series regular (157 episodes)
1969	The Name of the Game	Reporter	Episode: "The Inquiry"; uncredited
1969	The Bill Cosby Show	Al Socconis	Episode: "A Word from Our Sponsor"
1970	Mannix	Clay Riegles	Episode: "Blind Mirror"
1970–1971	The Interns	Dr. Sam Marsh	Series regular (24 episodes)
1971	Sarge	Steve Wainwright	Episode: "A Terminal Case of Vengeance"
1971–1972	The Man and the City	Andy Hays	Series regular (15 episodes)
1971–1973	Love, American Style	The Young Man / Jack	2 episodes
1972	The Bold Ones: The New Doctors	Dr. Vic Wheelwright	Episode: "Discovery at Fourteen"
1972	The Sixth Sense	Dr. Gil Clarke	Episode: "Witch, Witch, Burning Bright"
1972	The Longest Night	Willis	Television film
1972	Jigsaw	unknown role	Episode: "The Men"
1972	Cannon	Ron Cota	Episode: "Stakeout"
1972	Bonanza	Dr. James Willis	Episode: "The Hidden Enemy"
1972	Circle of Fear	Frank Simmons	Episode: "Elegy for a Vampire"
1972	Banacek	Jason Trotter	Episode: "The Greatest Collection of Them All"
1972	The Rookies	Frank Essex	Episode: "The Wheel of Death"
1972	The Wide World of Mystery	Steven	Episode: "Nightmare Step"
1972–1973	Owen Marshall, Counselor at Law	Brad Newman / Blair Cameron	2 episodes
1972–1974	Marcus Welby, M.D.	Frank Ferra / Clifford Lorimer	2 episodes
1973	She Cried Murder	Walter Stepanic	Television film
1974	The Questor Tapes	Jerry Robinson	Television film
1974	Live Again, Die Again	James Carmichael	Television film
1974	The New Land	unknown role	Episode: "The World Is: Persistence"
1974	The Six Million Dollar Man	David Tate	Episode: "The Pioneers"
1974	Harry O	Cole Harris	Episode: "Material Witness"
1975	Ladies of the Corridor	Paul Osgood	Television film
1975–1980	Dinah!	Himself (Guest)	5 episodes
1976–1977	The Hollywood Squares	Himself (Panelist)	3 episodes
1976–1979	The $25,000 Pyramid	Himself (Celebrity Contestant)	5 episodes
1977–1977	Tattletales	Himself (Panelist)	6 episodes
1975–1983	M*A*S*H	Captain B.J. Hunnicutt	Series regular (179 episodes); Writer (8 episodes)
1976	McNaughton's Daughter	Colin Pierce	Miniseries
1976–1984	The $10,000 Pyramid	Himself (Celebrity Contestant)	49 episodes
1978	Battered	Michael Hawks	Television film
1979	Sex and the Single Parent	George	Television film
1979	Letters from Frank	Richard Miller	Television film
1979	Ebony, Ivory & Jade	—N/a	Television film; writer
1979–1980	The Tonight Show Starring Johnny Carson	Himself (Guest)	2 episodes
1980	Father Damien: The Leper Priest	Robertson	Television film
1982	Prime Suspect	Frank Staplin	Television film
1982	The Merv Griffin Show	Himself (Guest)	Episode: "01.22.1982"
1982	The Regis Philbin Show	Himself (Guest)	Episode: "#1.81"
1983	Memorial Day	Matt Walker	Television film; also executive producer
1983	Choices of the Heart	Ambassador Robert E. White	Television film
1984	J.F.K.: A One-Man Show	John Fitzgerald Kennedy	Television film
1984	The $25,000 Pyramid	Himself (Celebrity Contestant)	5 episodes
1985	Private Sessions	Dr. Joe Braden	Television film
1986	Vanishing Act	Harry Kenyon	Television film
1989	A Deadly Silence	Attorney Gianelli	Television film
1989	Incident at Dark River	Tim McFall	Television film Also executive producer and writer
1990	Coach	Jeffrey	Episode: "A Jerk at the Opera"
1990	Murder, She Wrote	Drew Borden	Episode: "The Family Jewels"
1990	Frederick Forsyth Presents	Joe Roth	Episode: "The Price of the Bride"
1991	The Whereabouts of Jenny	Van Zandy	Television film
1991	Matlock	Judge David Bennett	2 episodes
1991	Silent Motive	Detective Paul Trella	Television film; also producer
1991	Memories of M*A*S*H	Himself	Television special
1994	Hart to Hart: Old Friends Never Die	Frank Crane	Television film
1994	An Evening at the Improv	Himself (Host)	Episode: "Mike Farrell/John Pinette/Bruce Gold, and more!"
1995	The Monroes	Tustin	3 episodes
1996	Vows of Deception	Clay Spencer	Television film
1996–1999	Superman: The Animated Series	Jonathan Kent (voice)	9 episodes
1997	Sins of the Mind	William (voice)	Television film; also executive producer
1997–2003	Biography	Himself (Interviewee)	2 episodes
1999	Jeopardy!	Himself (Celebrity Contestant)	"S15 EP #184"
1999	The Vatican Revealed	Narrator	Television film
1999–2002	Providence	Dr. James Hansen	Series regular (96 episodes)
2000	The 70s: The Decade That Changed Television	Himself (Host)	Television film
2002	M*A*S*H: 30th Anniversary Reunion	Himself	Television special; also executive producer
2003	The Crooked E: The Unshredded Truth About Enron	Kenneth Lay	Television film
2003	Justice League	Jonathan Kent (voice)	Episode: "Comfort and Joy"
2004	The Clinic	Dr. Cyrus Gachet	Television film
2004	Justice League Unlimited	Jonathan Kent, Brainiac Drone (voice)	Episode: "For the Man Who Has Everything"
2005	Locusts	Lyle Rierden	Television film
2005	Larry King Live	Himself (Guest)	1 episode
2006	E! True Hollywood Story	Himself (Interviewee)	Episode: "Michael J. Fox"
2007	Smith	Dr. Breen	unknown episode
2007–2008	Desperate Housewives	Milton Lang	3 episodes
2008	Law & Order: Special Victims Unit	Jonah Malcolm	Episode: "Persona"
2009	Without a Trace	Ross Baldwin	Episode: "Hard Landing"
2009	Ghost Whisperer	Bill Jett	Episode: "Do Over"
2010	Miami Medical	Dr. Carl Willis	Episode: "Golden Hour"
2012	Supernatural	Fred Jones	Episode: "Hunteri Heroici"
2014–2015	The Red Road	David Rogers	7 episodes
2018	American Crime Story	Lee Miglin	2 episodes
2019	NCIS	Judge Miles Deakin	2 episodes
2026	9-1-1	William "Bill" Schneider	Episode: "Handle with Care"

== Accolades ==
Year	Title	Accolade / Category	Results	Ref
1980	M*A*S*H*	Primetime Emmy Award for Outstanding Supporting Actor in a Comedy or Variety or Music Series (for playing B.J. Hunnicutt)	Nominated	
1982	M*A*S*H*	Directors Guild Award for Outstanding Directorial Achievement in Comedy Series (for episode "Death Takes a Holiday")	Nominated	
1981	M*A*S*H*	Primetime Emmy Award for Outstanding Writing in a Comedy Series (for episode "Death Takes a Holiday")	Nominated	
1982	The Body Human: Becoming a Man	Daytime Emmy Award for Outstanding Performer in Children's Programming	Nominated	
1993	—N/a	Women in Film Crystal + Lucy Award for Humanitarian Award	Won	
2009	M*A*S*H*	TV Land Award for Impact Award (shared with Alan Alda, Allan Arbus, William Christopher, Larry Gelbart, Jeff Maxwell, Burt Metcalfe, Gene Reynolds, David Odgen Stiers, Loretta Swit, Kellye Nakahara)	Won	
2018	American Crime Story	Gold Derby Award for Ensemble of the Year (shared with Joanna Adler, Annaleigh Ashford, Jon Jon Briones, Darren Criss, Penelope Cruz, Jay R. Ferguson, Cody Fern, Max Greenfield, Judith Light, Ricky Martin, Dascha Polanco, Edgar Ramirez, Finn Wittrock)	Nominated	
