= NCIS season 16 =

Season of television series

NCIS
- Season 16
- Season 16 U.S. DVD cover
- Starring: Mark Harmon; Sean Murray; Wilmer Valderrama; Emily Wickersham; Maria Bello; Brian Dietzen; Diona Reasonover; Rocky Carroll; David McCallum
- No. of episodes: 24

Release
- Original network: CBS
- Original release: September 25, 2018 – May 21, 2019

Season chronology
- ← Previous; Season 15 Next → Season 17

The sixteenth season of the American police procedural drama NCIS originally aired from September 25, 2018, through May 21, 2019, at the same time slot as in the previous seasons, Tuesdays at 8:00 p.m. and contained 24 episodes.

NCIS depicts a fictional team of special agents from the Naval Criminal Investigative Service, which conducts criminal investigations involving the U.S. Navy and Marine Corps.

Season 16 features two major storylines after the premiere concludes the plot from the previous season's finale: a season-long arc involving a vigilante justice ring, and the reveal that Ziva David is actually alive halfway through the season. The latter fact is confirmed by her physical appearance in the final moments of the finale, "Daughters". This season takes on a darker undertone for Gibbs as he reveals to his team that he killed the man responsible for his wife Shannon and daughter Kelly's deaths.

== Cast and characters ==
=== Main ===
- Mark Harmon as Leroy Jethro Gibbs, NCIS Supervisory Special Agent (SSA) of the Major Case Response Team (MCRT) assigned to Washington's Navy Yard
- Sean Murray as Timothy McGee, NCIS Senior Special Agent, Second in Command of MCRT
- Wilmer Valderrama as Nick Torres, NCIS Special Agent
- Emily Wickersham as Eleanor "Ellie" Bishop, NCIS Special Agent
- Maria Bello as Dr. Jacqueline "Jack" Sloane, NCIS Senior Resident Agent and Operational Psychologist
- Brian Dietzen as Dr. Jimmy Palmer, Assistant Medical Examiner for NCIS (episodes 1–17), Chief Medical Examiner for NCIS (episodes 17–24)
- Diona Reasonover as Kasie Hines, Forensic Specialist for NCIS
- Rocky Carroll as Leon Vance, NCIS Director
- David McCallum as Dr. Donald "Ducky" Mallard, Chief Medical Examiner for NCIS (episodes 1–17), NCIS Historian (episodes 17–24)

=== Recurring ===
- Joe Spano as Tobias Fornell, Private Detective and former FBI Senior Special Agent
- Robert Wagner as Anthony DiNozzo, Sr., father of former NCIS Special Agent Anthony DiNozzo
- Scott William Winters as Westley Clark, CIA Agent
- Margo Harshman as Delilah Fielding-McGee, DoD Intelligence Analyst and McGee's wife
- Laura San Giacomo as Dr. Grace Confalone, psychotherapist
- Don Lake as Phillip Brooks, Navy Captain
- Larry Miller as Ed Slater, Jimmy Palmer's father-in-law
- Melinda McGraw as Diane Sterling, deceased IRS Special Agent and Gibbs' and Fornell's ex-wife
- Pej Vahdat as Nigel Hakim, British Humanitarian and terrorist
- Mitch Pileggi as Wynn Crawford, U.S. Secretary of Defense
- Kent Shocknek as Guy Ross, ZNN news anchor
- Mike Farrell as Judge Miles Deakin
- Elayn J. Taylor as Odette Malone, owner of Ziva's private office
- Juliette Angelo as Emily Fornell, Tobias Fornell’s daughter
- Naomi Grace as Kayla Vance, Leon Vance's daughter
- Dionne Gipson as Mallory Madden, CIA Agent and Leon Vance's ex-girlfriend
- Kate Hamilton as Faith Tolliver, Jack Sloane's biological daughter

=== Special guest star ===
- Cote de Pablo as Ziva David, former Mossad Officer and former NCIS Special Agent

=== Guest ===
- Erin Cummings as Marine Major Ellen Wallace, Gibbs's ex-fiancée
- Charles Robinson as Ray Jennings, former Marine Lance Corporal
- Fred Dryer as Thomas Fletcher, retired Marine Master Sergeant
- Dabney Coleman as Army Corporal John Sydney
- Dee Wallace as Claire Hall
- Michele Boyd as Emily Ross
- Charles Tyler Kinder as young Timothy McGee
- Ashley Liao as Hayley
- Megan Gallagher as Jennifer Leo, Under Secretary of the Navy
- Merrick McCartha as Dr. Eugene Pierce

== Episodes ==
No. overall	No. in season	Title	Directed by	Written by	Original release date	Prod. code	U.S. viewers (millions)
355	1	"Destiny's Child"	Tony Wharmby	Steven D. Binder	September 25, 2018	1601	12.56
Part 2 of 2: After events in "Date with Destiny" Hakim and his mother Zaiyema "incentivize" Vance. Four weeks later: McGee questions Joey Peanuts. Olivia Kahn hounds Acting Director Gibbs for signatures. Hakim forces Vance to commit bank robbery; manager Myron Holt discloses five-million in charity assets, plus two-million in gold. Vice Admiral Richard Hasley believes Vance compromised. Marine Colonel Leah Siffler revokes Vance's access. British Deputy Ambassador Sybil Rigg interdicts Hakim's gold via Interpol. On ZNN, Vance denounces America's war on Afghanistan as Navy recruitment centers explode. Kasie discovers Vance's eye-blink anagram – "Kayla" – who Hakim leverages for Vance's codes to the Bethesda Naval Nuclear Test Station. Zaiyema orders Kayla killed; NCIS-SA Rod Beecham dies protecting her. Kayla grabs Beecham's gun, firing back. McGee and Gibbs kill Rafi Paiz. Confronting Rigg about Hakim's gold, Sloan is captured. Emma Thatcher explains Glowbeam Technologies, which "encrypts Internet traffic." Claiming to be CIA Agent Nazy Rickman, Jaah conspires to free Vance, who phones NCIS. As Hakim expected, Siffler orders "Operation Lockdown," triggering a Trojan hack, causing the station to "go critical." McGee finds the Trojan, and Torres disables Glowbeam's encryption, saving the station. Sloane reveals tricking Rigg for Hakim's location. Gibbs' rescue team arrests Hakim and Zaiyema. Cast: First main role appearance of Diona Reasonover as Kasie Hines.
356	2	"Love Thy Neighbor"	Terrence O'Hara	Scott Williams	October 2, 2018	1602	12.13
Teens Jonny and Mitch find Navy Lt. Davis Mooney's corpse in his Jacuzzi. Neighbors present pet theories: divorcé Loni Braddish suggests an affair, hitting on McGee; Gary Clifford witnessed a burglar at the Reynolds'; Edgar Fitz calls Mooney's everyday activates "suspicious;" Dan and Nancy Reynolds suspect slovenly "bathrobe guy" Edgar; ex-wife Sheila Mooney believes Davis was "getting too close," writing his book about The Dentist's unsolved serial murders. Feeling down, Torres, on "Ducky's orders," blows off steam with Palmer, ordering refills from Myrna. But David and Brendan heckle Torres and Palmer, who are arrested for starting a "Wine & Paint" bar fight. Gibbs orders Torres to talk about his issues with Sloan, who orders him home. Suspect Lewis Dacey claims Mooney had apologized, and moved to a new neighborhood where the Dentist resides. Sheila presents a parcel Davis mailed to himself, containing a box with nine teeth from the Dentist's victims. Gibbs and Sloan theorize, the killer stopped seven years ago after marriage or children; the timeline matches Dan Reynolds. Gibbs interrogates and tests Dan's reaction. Kasie finds purple nail polish, and touch DNA matching Nancy. Regarding Clayton Reeves death, Torres confides, "I miss my buddy." Bishop, "Me, too.
357	3	"Boom"	Leslie Libman	Brendan Fehily	October 9, 2018	1604	12.36
McGee is starstruck when the team investigates an explosion outside the home of Navy Petty Officer First Class Todd Nicholas and his wife, popular reality TV star Sheba Nicholas. Vance continues physical therapy for the injuries sustained when he was held hostage and meets a woman named Mallory, but she has a secret agenda.
358	4	"Third Wheel"	James Whitmore Jr.	Christopher J. Waild	October 16, 2018	1603	11.87
Gibbs' quiet vacation at his remote cabin is interrupted by a surprise visit from Fornell and Navy Captain Phillip Brooks, as well as a call from NCIS asking for his help locating a robber hiding in the woods near him.
359	5	"Fragments"	Michael Zinberg	Gina Lucita Monreal	October 23, 2018	1605	11.26
The discovery of a nearly fifty-year old recording leads the team to reopen the murder investigation of a Marine supposedly fragged in Vietnam in an attempt to exonerate the man convicted as evidence surfaces that the murder was likely a suicide.
360	6	"Beneath the Surface"	Rocky Carroll	Scott J. Jarrett & Matthew R. Jarrett	October 30, 2018	1606	12.32
A Naval officer is found dead in a truck stop bathroom alongside a man Torres knew from basic training – whom they discover was a professional hitman killed because of a job he refused to take. During the case, Palmer starts to think that autopsy is haunted. CIA officer Westley Clark is introduced to the team, and Sloane is immediately suspicious.
361	7	"A Thousand Words"	Alrick Riley	David J. North	November 13, 2018	1607	12.47
The theft of a wall from a Navy bank leads the team on the search of a mysterious street artist when QR codes are discovered in their work leading to activist sites.
362	8	"Friendly Fire"	Thomas J. Wright	Jennifer Corbett	November 20, 2018	1608	11.95
Collecting marsh litter, Waterway Volunteers perform community service. Trista and Archie discover a corpse, initially identified as Navy Sr. Chief Richard Granger, who is actually alive and working at the DLA. Autopsy reveals he is cyber systems engineer Wesley Moore, who hacked classified DoD messages on twelve KIA marines for Captain Alicia Voit, who was subsequently killed by Aazar Atwa's Taliban in Kabul on the same day as Moore. Stateside, Marine Colonel Jonah Park escorts Voit's body. Sloan surmises Voit could not trust her chain of command. Camp Russell, Kabul, Afganistan: Marine General Phillip Braxton's men capture Atwa, who, bargaining for freedom, claims an American disclosed troop routes; a sniper silences Atwa before he can name him. Reviewing trafficams to discover who hit Moore's car, Kasie and Torres find a red truck registered to private military contractor Xavier Blackburn, who claims Moore stole U.S. intelligence. Blackburn is surprised to learn Moore was investigating an American aiding the Taliban. "He told me Moore was dangerous." Gibbs, "He?" Bishop confronts Blackburn's employer, Justin Kinneman. Braxton asks why? Bishop, "simple economics." McGee, "if enemy attacks increase...U.S. military strengthens their presence," securing his funding. Claiming, "it wasn't about money," Kinneman is arrested.
363	9	"Tailing Angie"	Terrence O'Hara	George Schenck	December 4, 2018	1609	12.04
Three years ago: Admiral Norton Padgett discovers a burglar accessed his safe. Angie Gray is videoed driving away. Present day: Gibbs and McGee tail Angie, photographing the driver, who Kasie identifies as robbery convict Lanny Peete, Angie's cellmate. During a stakeout to locate her accomplice, Sloane "accidentally" bumps into Angie to profile her. Torres and Bishop observe P.I. Phil Iverson entering Angie's hotel room. Peete tells Bishop about Angie's boyfriend J.T., a bad influence. Bishop discovers that Padgett's former personal assistant and suspect Lew Nolte had called Angie. In J.T.'s old home, Angie finds a corpse, which Palmer and Bishop identify as John Thomas Storvelle, who was stabbed. With his beach resort bar receipt, Kasie narrows his Netherlands Antillean guilder to Saint Martin, where he fled and spent his cut of the money before returning stateside. Sloane breaks the news to Angie. Gibbs trails Iverson to Padgett, suspecting something more important than money was stolen. McGee learns Storvelle and Nolte billeted together five years ago. NCIS convinces Angie to record Nolte incriminating himself. He brags about blackmailing Norton with marriage- and career-ending pornographic photos Norton kept in his safe, and about killing Storvelle. NCIS arrests Nolte.
364	10	"What Child Is This?"	Michael Zinberg	Scott Williams	December 11, 2018	1610	12.28
Needing "a bouncer on the food line" against Albert "Mr. Vicious" Leary, Neera Kapoor asks a volunteer where homeless Navy veteran Jerome Murray is. Neera finds him dead. NCIS questions Leary, who fires, nearly hitting Bishop, forcing return fire that kills him. They find his drugs, and a baby boy. Attorney Paul Spencer claims Leary might have a Florida girlfriend. Kasie matches knife prints to Leary, but not the baby's DNA. With CPS overloaded, Bishop and Torres care for him. Jimmy and Kasie ask Chaplain Samuel Kemp about Jerome's Purple Heart. Overhearing, witness Richard Sims tips Gibbs' team to E-Z Mart video, showing Leary paying seventeen year-old Tanya Jacobs for her baby. Meanwhile, Jerome's death becomes personal for Kasie, whose Navy father died suddenly around the same time last Christmas. Finding her through "juvie" drug offenses, Tanya says an agency found an adoptive couple, but her dealer Vicious offered $10,000. Speaking from her own experience, Sloane counsels Tanya into adoption. Asked to whom Vicious was selling, Tanya answers, "A doctor or lawyer or something." Gibbs re-questions Spencer. Sloane fondly reviews photos of Faith Tolliver, and her family. Lydia Miles oversees the baby's adoption by Pete and Judy Shaw.
365	11	"Toil and Trouble"	Leslie Libman	Christopher J. Waild	January 8, 2019	1611	12.08
United States Secretary of Defense Wynn Crawford demands a murder investigation involving stolen chlorine gas be shut down and that Torres and McGee are arrested for actions taken during the case. Also, Torres appears to be jealous of a new boyfriend Bishop has. The episode ends with McGee being offered a high-paying tech job and Westley Clark secretly meeting with Crawford. Cast: Mitch Pileggi as Wynn Crawford
366	12	"The Last Link"	Rocky Carroll	Brendan Fehily	January 15, 2019	1612	12.21
NCIS stages photos of Navy Lieutenant Ross Johnson dead to set up drug dealer Michael Deegan, who contracted hitman Tommy "Peaches" Mulligan. Peaches wears a wire to incriminate Deegan, who denies involvement. Confronted directly, he recognizes Torres and Bishop, "Don't forget your bug." McGee relieves NCIS Probationary Agent Anna Ventura guarding Johnson. Torres tackles a room-service guy, but Johnson dies, having already been poisoned earlier. Kasie triggers alarms for hazardous carfentanil. They check Megan Boone's upholstery autoshop video. Bishop recognizes the sketched suspect (who delivered Johnson's omelet) servicing a vending machine. After defeating the mag-lock, Kasie is electrocuted by the high-tech machine, containing Kicker Mintz hiding Oxycodone. Prints and DNA match Oliver Sherry, who reveals, Johnson returned cash erroneously dispensed, but started asking questions. Also, Deegan is not his boss. NCIS apprehends the real boss, Peaches. Meanwhile, after Leroy Jethro Moore dies, Army Corporal John Sydney visits Gibbs, who "has history" with Sydney. He wants to "fulfill the Last Man Club oath" to collect all twelve WWII military ID bracelets from his comrades. They return to Stillwater, retrieving it from Cal Frasier who now owns Gibbs' father's store. Johnson finally explains why he suddenly left when Gibbs was a boy.
367	13	"She"	Mark Horowitz	Gina Lucita Monreal	February 12, 2019	1614	13.37
The team finds a malnourished and confused 9-year old girl who ran away to seek refuge in a storage unit after being locked away for her entire life. Her mother, Morgan Burke, had disappeared several years prior, and the discovery of the girl leads to Morgan's cold case being reopened. Bishop discovers notes that Ziva David had kept on the case even after NCIS officially ceased investigation upon finding out her car had gone off a cliff and the death was ruled a suicide, but a wedge between Gibbs and Bishop is formed when the latter tries to explain her findings to the team. Despite Gibbs' orders for her to drop the matter, referencing rule #10 ("never get personally involved in a case"), Bishop begins her own project to find Morgan, and she is led to a shack where the suspect, Robert Hill, is keeping her captive. Bishop saves Morgan's life and she is reunited with her daughter, while Bishop makes peace with Gibbs, who subsequently burns a slip of paper with rule #10 written on it. When Bishop goes to read a letter from Morgan's mother to Hill, which is what Ziva had promised to do, Hill surprises her by revealing that another female had read the letter to him and that she was going to "haunt his dreams"; Bishop returns to the "office" Ziva had rented and finds a note without a signature. It reads: "Eleanor Bishop, for the safety of my family, please keep my secret."
368	14	"Once Upon a Tim"	Tony Wharmby	David J. North & Steven D. Binder	February 19, 2019	1613	12.74
McGee is forced to revisit his high school days when an old password of his is found at a crime scene.
369	15	"Crossing the Line"	Michael Zinberg	Jennifer Corbett	February 26, 2019	1615	11.77
The team investigates the mysterious death of a straight-laced sailor on a Navy destroyer. Meanwhile, Torres is frustrated when Vance has him mentor three high school students, but has a change of heart when one of them reveals he is the son of an agent who died in the explosion at NCIS headquarters.
370	16	"Bears and Cubs"	Diana Valentine	Scott Williams	March 12, 2019	1616	12.08
Palmer's father-in-law asks him to manipulate evidence on a case, putting Palmer in a difficult position as work and family collide; Ducky debates his position on the team.
371	17	"Silent Service"	Rocky Carroll	Scott J. Jarrett & Matthew R. Jarrett	March 26, 2019	1617	12.18
Gibbs and Bishop's investigation into the death of a Navy SEAL gets complicated when the submarine they're on dives for a mission – and nobody can contact them. After the case is solved, Vance offers Ducky the newly created position of NCIS historian instead of retiring, and he accepts.
372	18	"Mona Lisa"	Alrick Riley	David J. North & Brendan Fehily	April 2, 2019	1618	11.89
Torres relies on his team's investigative skills after he wakes up on a dilapidated fishing boat, unable to remember the last 12 hours and his shirt covered in blood. Meanwhile, Vance continues his relationship with Mallory, unaware that she's secretly working with Westley Clark on investigating the NCIS director. He gives her a necklace as a gift, but it secretly records her meeting with Clark; Vance promptly breaks up with Mallory before Clark shows him and Gibbs a secret bank account containing a quarter-billion dollars belonging to Wynn Crawford, believing him to be responsible for embezzlement.
373	19	"Perennial"	Tony Wharmby	Gina Lucita Monreal	April 9, 2019	1619	11.82
The NCIS team searches for a male suspect who fled a mass shooting at a naval hospital. Sloane initially recuses herself but reverses her decision after telling Gibbs that the only witness known to have seen the shooter clearly is her biological daughter who she gave up for adoption on the day she was born. (It is later revealed that her daughter recognized her and that Sloane moved from LA to be near her daughter.) The shooting was an attempt to kill a police officer, who had responded to a fatal traffic accident caused by the shooter's brother years earlier, to stop the officer presenting impact statements at the brother's parole hearings.
374	20	"Hail & Farewell"	Michael Zinberg	Jennifer Corbett	April 16, 2019	1620	11.88
At his construction site, foreman Omar Lewis discovers the body of Marine Major Ellen Wallace. A ZNN newscaster had previously reported her killed at the Pentagon on 9/11. Palmer rules cause of death as blunt force head trauma, indicating murder. It is revealed, Ellen was Gibbs ex-fiancée at the time, but unlike other relationships, Gibbs ended it because he loved her. Kasi finds Gibbs' blood on Ellen's uniform, prompting Sloan's interrogation. McGee removes him from the case after Gibbs abruptly leaves the room. However, Gibbs is cleared after DoD Cyber Engineer Taylor Southard proves from her access badge that Ellen entered, but never left the Pentagon. Bishop surmises someone carried her corpse out. Forensic scanning of an eighteen year-old hard drive identifies journalist Franklin Morrison, who reveals Ellen had been investigating suspected war crimes when her father, Gen. James Wallace, commanded U.S. forces in Kosovo. Confronted, Wallace confirms he asked Ellen to investigate. Sifting 18,482 Pentagon employees, Kasie and Torres find BGen. Daniel Kent, who was Wallace's aide in 1998. Despite no other evidence than his living near the burial site at the time, Kent confesses after five minutes alone with Gibbs.
375	21	"Judge, Jury..."	James Whitmore Jr.	Christopher J. Waild	April 30, 2019	1621	11.80
376	22	"...and Executioner"	Terrence O'Hara	Christopher J. Waild & David J. North	May 7, 2019	1622	11.66
Judge, Jury...: Kasie enters DNA from a 30-year-old cold case into the system, incriminating ice cream truck driver Stuart Crum for poisoning several children (one of which was killed). While testifying at his trial, the team is thrown when a loophole forces a mistrial and allows for Crum's release (and subsequent death). Meanwhile, Gibbs and Vance's investigation into the illegitimate bank account requires McGee to visit the tech company offering him a new job; McGee searches their private servers for information, but is caught doing so. Interrogating the bailiff from the trial, NCIS discovers a $3 million payment that came from the offshore account, leading them to realize the murderer's own death was a hit. Gibbs and Vance immediately call for a meeting with CIA officer Clark, but upon arriving at Gibbs' house (which was broken into), they find Clark dead with Mallory standing close by....and Executioner: Mallory had followed Clark to Gibbs’ house and shot him; she claims self-defense. Meanwhile, the judge presiding over Crum’s trial, Miles Deakin, is shown to be in control of the offshore bank account and, as such, Crum’s death (this reveals that the account finances vigilante murders). He, along with four other judges, have also been secretly investigating Gibbs over Pedro Hernandez’s death. Gibbs is attacked at the parking lot of his favorite diner by an unknown hitman, prompting him to confront Deakin alone. Kasie's forensic tests prove Mallory to be the assailant, having been hired by Deakin to kill Gibbs. Mallory's recording device disguised as the necklace Vance gave her prior is enough to incriminate Deakin. During the investigation, Gibbs angrily admits to his team that he murdered Pedro Hernandez. Cast: Mike Farrell as Miles Deakin
377	23	"Lost Time"	Diana Valentine	Teleplay by : Scott Williams; Story by : Scott Williams & Frank Cardea	May 14, 2019	1623	11.70
While the team investigates the murder of a Navy SEAL who had helped eliminate a known terrorist leader, Gibbs suffers a breakdown that leads him to his psychiatrist.
378	24	"Daughters"	Tony Wharmby	Steven D. Binder	May 21, 2019	1624	12.10
Part 1 of 3: Vance tells Gibbs, Fornell is at the hospital. One hour earlier: Spencer Cox drives; Alexis comforts Emily Fornell, who a paramedic checks. Presently: Dr. C. Vargas stabilizes Emily in critical condition, "overdosed on opioids." They initially believe "her drink was spiked" at college. Diane Sterling's ghost manifests, demanding Gibbs' vigilante justice. Ducky finagles jurisdiction; Vance permits the investigation. Emily recovers; Tobias wants vengeance. Kasie analyzes a "bootleg" pill Alexis provided. Overhearing, Tobias recognizes Gibbs' "Diane tone," and laughs. A local LEO arrests over-doser Joseph Taylor, who names "Professor Ralphie" (Ralph Yorning). Gibbs finds Ralph overdosed, dead from heroin, with Emily, high. She and Tobias argue. Palmer rules it murder. Spencer reveals they are dorm-mates. NCIS interrogates Spencer for Ralph's supplier, leading to podiatrist Dr. Berman, who allows an audit. To help Emily, Tobias asks Gibbs to channel Diane for advice, "Just be her father." Kasie learns Ralph's stolen script-pad prescriptions are filled by a corrupt pharmacist, who Gibbs pressures for his "gray-market" Canadian distributor (reviewing Kendra Allston case notes from "Crossing the Line"). Emily admits to Tobias, "I need help." Diane advises Gibbs again before leaving. Hearing someone, Gibbs asks, "What now?" Ziva David arrives, "Hello, Gibbs....you're in danger."

== Ratings ==
Viewership and ratings per episode of NCIS season 16
No.	Title	Air date	Rating/share (18–49)	Viewers (millions)	DVR (18–49)	DVR viewers (millions)	Total (18–49)	Total viewers (millions)
1	"Destiny's Child"	September 25, 2018	1.4/6	12.56	0.7	4.09	2.2	16.65
2	"Love Thy Neighbor"	October 2, 2018	1.4/6	12.13	0.7	3.91	2.1	16.04
3	"Boom"	October 9, 2018	1.4/6	12.36	0.6	3.72	2.0	16.09
4	"Third Wheel"	October 16, 2018	1.2/5	11.87	0.7	3.82	1.9	15.70
5	"Fragments"	October 23, 2018	1.2/5	11.26	0.7	3.73	1.9	15.01
6	"Beneath the Surface"	October 30, 2018	1.3/5	12.32	0.6	3.52	1.9	15.84
7	"A Thousand Words"	November 13, 2018	1.4/6	12.47	0.7	3.84	2.1	16.31
8	"Friendly Fire"	November 20, 2018	1.2/5	11.95	0.7	3.89	1.9	15.84
9	"Tailing Angie"	December 4, 2018	1.2/5	12.04	0.7	3.84	1.9	15.88
10	"What Child is This?"	December 11, 2018	1.3/6	12.28	0.7	3.84	2.0	16.12
11	"Toil and Trouble"	January 8, 2019	1.2/5	12.08	0.7	3.77	1.9	15.85
12	"The Last Link"	January 15, 2019	1.3/6	12.21	0.6	3.77	1.9	15.98
13	"She"	February 12, 2019	1.4/6	13.37	0.7	4.18	2.1	17.56
14	"Once Upon a Tim"	February 19, 2019	1.2/6	12.74	0.6	3.75	1.9	16.49
15	"Crossing the Line"	February 26, 2019	1.2/6	11.77	0.7	3.77	1.9	15.55
16	"Bears and Cubs"	March 12, 2019	1.1/5	12.08	0.6	3.89	1.7	15.98
17	"Silent Service"	March 26, 2019	1.2/6	12.18	0.6	3.57	1.8	15.76
18	"Mona Lisa"	April 2, 2019	1.1/5	11.89	0.7	3.69	1.8	15.59
19	"Perennial"	April 9, 2019	1.2/6	11.82	0.6	3.38	1.7	15.20
20	"Hail & Farewell"	April 16, 2019	1.1/5	11.88	0.6	3.75	1.7	15.64
21	"Judge, Jury..."	April 30, 2019	1.1/5	11.80	0.6	3.70	1.7	15.43
22	"...and Executioner"	May 7, 2019	1.0/5	11.66	0.7	3.79	1.7	15.41
23	"Lost Time"	May 14, 2019	1.1/6	11.70	0.7	3.75	1.8	15.45
24	"Daughters"	May 21, 2019	1.2/6	12.10	0.7	3.89	1.8	15.86
