= The Mice (The Outer Limits) =

- The Outer Limits episode
- Episode no.: Season 1 Episode 15
- Directed by: Alan Crosland, Jr.
- Story by: Bill S. Ballinger; Lou Morheim
- Teleplay by: Bill S. Ballinger; Joseph Stefano
- Cinematography by: Conrad Hall
- Production code: 19
- Original air date: January 6, 1964

Guest appearances
- Henry Silva; Diana Sands; Michael Higgins; Francis De Sales; Ron Foster

Episode chronology
← Previous "The Zanti Misfits"	Next → "Controlled Experiment"

"The Mice" is an episode of the original The Outer Limits television show. It first aired on January 6, 1964, during the first season.

== Plot ==
A convict named Chino Rivera, sentenced to life imprisonment after being charged with first degree homicide when he killed his sister's abusive husband, volunteers to be a human guinea pig for a matter transportation experiment. In reality, the experiment is supposed to be an exchange of technology between Earth and an alien race called the Chromoites. When an inhabitant of Chromo, designated as their 'volunteer', materializes in the testing lab, it creates havoc until it is finally subdued, and then allowed to freely explore the countryside surrounding the research facility. As problems ensue and researchers die, Chino is blamed, only to find that the Chromoite, after murdering one of the scientists, has been sent to Earth to experiment with ways of producing food, artificially, for his starving race. Dr. Harrison, the medical doctor assigned to monitor Chino, following his injury when he attempted to escape, discovers the alien apparently eating an unknown substance that it had chemically germinated in a pond near the research facility, after they had previously informed the Earth scientists that their species sustained themselves through photosynthesis. The lead researcher, Dr. Kellander, re-establishes communication with the Chromo scientists, after capturing the 'volunteer', to admonish their actions, with them admitting their deception, believing that humans would not have aided in their plight, while explaining that their 'volunteer' is actually one of their renowned scientists who is invaluable to their cause in finding a means of feeding the millions of inhabitants on Chromo. At that point, the researcher calmly states, "You could have asked...all you had to do was to ask".

== Cast ==
- Henry Silva – as Chino Rivera
- Diana Sands – as Dr. Julia Harrison
- Michael Higgins – as Dr. Thomas Kellander
- Ron Foster – as Robert Richardson
- Don Ross – as Haddon
- Gene Tyburn – as Goldsmith
- Dabney Coleman – as Dr. Williams
- Francis De Sales – as Prison Warden
- Hugh Langtry – as Chromoite
- Vic Perrin – as Chromo Voice #1
- Robert Johnson – as Chromo Voice #2
