= Controlled Experiment =

- The Outer Limits episode
- Episode no.: Season 1 Episode 16
- Directed by: Leslie Stevens (uncredited)
- Written by: Leslie Stevens (uncredited)
- Cinematography by: John M. Nickolaus
- Production code: 6
- Original air date: January 13, 1964

Guest appearances
- Barry Morse; Carroll O’Connor; Grace Lee Whitney

Episode chronology
← Previous "The Mice"	Next → "Don't Open Till Doomsday"

"Controlled Experiment" is an episode of the original The Outer Limits television show. It first aired on January 13, 1964, during the first season. It is the only comedy episode of the series.

== Introduction ==
A love triangle appears to end in murder, but a strange pair of men appear to have the ability to replay time itself.

== Opening narration ==
Who hasn't seen the dark corners of great cities, where small and shabby creatures wander without purpose in the secret corners of the night? Without purpose? There are those whose purpose reaches far beyond our wildest dreams.

== Plot ==
Deimos and Phobos One are two Martians – whose names also happen to be those of Mars' moons– the latter being a researcher who wants to understand the concept of murder, as it is apparently exclusive to Earthlings (they are portrayed by actors Carroll O'Connor and Barry Morse, respectively, who play their characters as a sort of Holmes-and-Watson team). Upon his arrival on Earth, Phobos One contacts Deimos, whose 'cover' is working as a pawnbroker in a large American city. The duo, inconspicuously, investigates a shooting that is about to take place in a downtown hotel lobby that resulted from a love triangle, predicted and then reported by Martian Central Control. Using a machine that can manipulate the flow of time in a manner much the same as one might do with recorded video, they review this same event over and over again. They rewind time in order to watch the incident unfold at various speeds, forward and backward. Finally, they slow the passage of time down to such an extent that the participants seem to be standing still, the bullet suspended in flight, so that they can examine all of the nuances that, at "normal" speed, pass by too quickly for adequate, scientific observation. Phobos One is unable to simply remain a passive observer, and finally gives in to the temptation to tamper with the scenario and alter the outcome; he arranges the scenario so that the bullet is deflected at the last moment, preventing the murder from ever taking place. Phobos decides to remain on Earth indefinitely, finding that he enjoys life as a human being.

== Closing narration ==
Who knows? Perhaps the alteration of one small event may someday bring about the end of the world. But that someday is a long way off, and until then there is a good life to be lived in the here and now.

== Production ==
The credits for writer, director and producer of this episode are omitted from the finished print. They would normally be seen during Act I, after the episode title and the credits for the featured actors are shown. This means that writer/director Leslie Stevens is uncredited as such, although he does receive a prominent credit as executive producer at the end of the show. Similarly, Joseph Stefano receives no personal producer credit, although the episode is identified as a "Villa di Stefano" production at the episode's conclusion.

Actor Barry Morse, who stars in this episode, states in his autobiography that this was a possible pilot for a forthcoming science-fiction comedy series, which after being rejected was broadcast as an Outer Limits episode. A contemporary press review of the episode bears at least part of this story out, identifying "Controlled Experiment" as a pilot for a half-hour comedy series.

The flying saucer in the opening scene was built by special effects technician Paul Blaisdell for the 1957 film Invasion of the Saucer Men.

== Cast ==
- Barry Morse – as Phobos One
- Carroll O'Connor – as Deimos
- Grace Lee Whitney – as Carla Duveen
- Robert Fortier – as Bert Hamil
- Robert Kelljan – as Frank Brant
- Linda Hutchins – as Arlene Schnabel
- Leslie Stevens – as voice of Martian Computer Control (uncredited)
