= Demon with a Glass Hand =

- The Outer Limits episode
- Episode no.: Season 2 Episode 5
- Directed by: Byron Haskin
- Written by: Harlan Ellison
- Cinematography by: Kenneth Peach
- Production code: 41
- Original air date: October 17, 1964

Guest appearances
- Robert Culp – Trent; Arlene Martel – Consuelo Biros; Abraham Sofaer – Arch; Bill Hart – Durn; Rex Holman – Battle; Steve Harris – Breech; Robert Fortier – Budge; Wally Rose – Kyben #1; Fred Krone – Kyben #2

Episode chronology
← Previous "Expanding Human"	Next → "Cry of Silence"

"Demon with a Glass Hand" is an episode of the American television series The Outer Limits, the second to be based on a script by Harlan Ellison, which Ellison wrote specifically with actor Robert Culp in mind for the lead role. It originally aired on October 17, 1964, and was the fifth episode of the second season. In 2009, TV Guide ranked "Demon with a Glass Hand" #73 on its list of the 100 Greatest Episodes.

== Opening narration ==
"Through all the legends of ancient peoples – Assyrian, Babylonian, Sumerican [sic], Semitic – runs the saga of the Eternal Man, the one who never dies, called by various names in various times, but historically known as Gilgamesh, the man who has never tasted death ... the hero who strides through the centuries ..."

== Synopsis ==
Trent (Robert Culp) is a man with no memory of his life before the previous ten days. His left hand has been replaced by an advanced computer shaped like his missing hand and protected by some transparent material. Three fingers are missing; the computer tells him they must be reattached before it can tell Trent what is going on. Trent is being hunted by a handful of humanoid aliens called the Kyben; they have the missing appendages. The action takes place in a large rundown office building (the historic Bradbury Building in downtown Los Angeles) which the Kyben have sealed off from the world. In this deadly game of hide-and-seek, Trent enlists the help of Consuelo Biros (Arlene Martel), a woman who works in the building.

For reasons unknown to him, Trent was sent into the past via a "time mirror", located in the building. A captured Kyben tells Trent that both of them are from a thousand years in the future. In that future, Earth has been conquered by the Kyben, but all the surviving humans except Trent have mysteriously vanished. The aliens are being obliterated by a "radioactive plague" that is killing all of the Kyben occupation force, a plague apparently unleashed by the humans in a last-ditch effort to repel the invasion. In a desperate attempt to find a cure for the plague and to extract whatever knowledge is stored in the hand/computer, the Kyben have followed him back in time with the missing fingers.

Eventually, Trent defeats all of his Kyben hunters by ripping off the medallion-shaped devices they wear to anchor them in the past. Trent successfully destroys the mirror and recovers the missing fingers, one by one. When the computer is whole, he learns the terrible truth: He is not a man, but a robot. Brain-scans of the human survivors have been digitally encoded onto a gold-copper alloy wire wrapped around the solenoid in his thorax. Immune to disease, he must protect his precious cargo for 1,200 years, after the Kyben invasion, by which time the plague will have dissipated. Then he will resurrect the human race.

Trent had thought he was a man, as he and Consuelo had begun to develop feelings for each other. With the truth revealed, she leaves him, pity mixed with horror in her eyes. Trent is left to face 1,200 years of lonely vigil.

== Closing narration ==
"Like the Eternal Man of Babylonian legend, like Gilgamesh, one thousand plus two hundred years stretches before Trent. Without love. Without friendship. Alone; neither man nor machine, waiting. Waiting for the day he will be called to free the humans who gave him mobility. Movement, but not life."

== Awards ==
- 1965 Writers Guild of America Awards: Outstanding Script for a Television Anthology

== Production ==
Ellison's story outline depicted a sprawling, cross-country chase between the Kyben and Trent (then named Mr. Fish). Because this would have been prohibitively expensive, producer Ben Brady suggested that Ellison contain most of the action in a single structure when he went to script. Ellison agreed, realizing that by forcing the plot into an enclosed space, the change from a linear pursuit to a vertical climb — ascending as the action developed — would make for heightened tension. Most of this episode was shot in the Bradbury Building, the same location used for the final scenes of Blade Runner and a closing scene in the 1950 film noir classic, D.O.A.

Ellison's 10-page story outline was published in Brain Movies III in 2013.

Ellison's friendship with Robert Culp dated from the production of this episode. He found Culp to be very intelligent, quite a contrast to Ellison's opinion of most actors, whom he described as "dips — strictly non compos mentis." When Culp first met Ellison at the Bradbury building location for filming, Ellison introduced himself in a loud voice and told the actor that he had written the episode just for him. Culp also stated that he felt it was one of the best-written episodes of television in the history of the medium. Culp indicated that he felt the success of the series and this episode was due to the fact that it was, essentially, a morality play.

== Adaptations and unproduced sequel ==
A graphic novel adaptation, illustrated by Marshall Rogers, was published by DC Comics in January 1986. It was the fifth title of the DC Science Fiction Graphic Novel series.

Ellison's original script was published in Brain Movies Volume One, by Edgeworks Abbey, in 2011.

During the run of Babylon 5, series creator J. Michael Straczynski often said that Ellison would be writing a sequel to this story, possibly called "Demon in the Dust" or "Demon on the Run", as an episode. However, the proposed sequel episode never appeared. Ellison was a creative consultant on the series and said in a behind-the-scene book about Babylon 5 written during that show's third season:

"I want very much to write this script and Joe very much wants it, and I think it probably will get written during this next season, but one never knows. I don't want to promise because, if you promise, then all of a sudden fans on the Internet start screaming, 'Well, where is it, where is it? Why doesn't he do it, why isn't he doing it? He's late again, he's late again.' And then I have to get cranky, go to their house and nail their heads to a coffee table!"

In addition to "Demon With A Glass Hand", Ellison wrote other stories set against the backdrop of the "Earth–Kyba War." He adapted five of these — "Run For the Stars", "Life Hutch", "The Untouchable Adolescents", "Trojan Hearse", and "Sleeping Dogs" — into the graphic novel Night and the Enemy (1987), illustrated by Ken Steacy. "Life Hutch" would later be subsequently adapted (by Philip Gelatt) into an episode of the Netflix adult animated anthology series Love, Death & Robots. Also, Ellison's short story "The Human Operators" — which he co-wrote with A. E. van Vogt and which was later adapted into the eponymous episode of the new Outer Limits — is set in the same universe as this story; that story's Starfighter-series of military spacecraft were originally built for the Earth–Kyba war.

== Sampling ==
The music group Cabaret Voltaire sampled bits of dialogue from "Demon with a Glass Hand" for several songs:

- "Stay Out of It" from The Voice of America (1980): "the third part of your brain ... you know where it is?", "don't kill me please please" and "and my hand...my hand...told me what to do".
- "Yashar" from 2x45 (1982): "There's 70 billion people of Earth, where are they hiding?"
- "Soul Vine (70 Billion People)" from Plasticity (1992).
- "Soulenoid (Scream at the Right Time)" from Plasticity (1992).

== UK broadcast ==
This episode was first transmitted in the United Kingdom on BBC Two on Friday, 28 March 1980. Although the first season had been screened in the UK in 1964 by Granada TV, and a few other ITV regions (Associated-Rediffusion, ATV, TWW, STV), it wasn't until the BBC transmitted all 49 episodes, in two seasons between 28 March 1980 and 17 July 1981, that the second-season episodes were first seen in the UK. The BBC chose "Demon with a Glass Hand" as the first episode to be broadcast; none of the episodes in 1980–1981 were screened in series order, and second-season episodes were mixed in with first-season episodes. This was also its last UK terrestrial television broadcast until being shown on Talking Pictures TV in September 2022.

== Feature film ==
The episode was announced to be adapted as a motion picture in June 2014.

== Inaccuracies ==
The opening and closing narration are wrong about the legendary, partially divine ruler of Uruk King Gilgamesh, insofar that he did not achieve immortality or a life lasting many centuries or millennia in the Epic of Gilgamesh. He is, however, said to have lived 126 years. Uta-napišti (Akkadian) or Ziusudra (Sumerian), the Mesopotamian hero of the Flood myth whom Gilgamesh seeks out on his journey to learn his secret, is the one who has attained immortality.
