= The Invisible Enemy =

The Invisible Enemy may refer to:

- "The Invisible Enemy (The Outer Limits)", a 1964 Outer Limits episode
- The Invisible Enemy (Doctor Who), a 1977 Doctor Who serial
