= Arlene Martel =

American writer and actress (1936–2014)

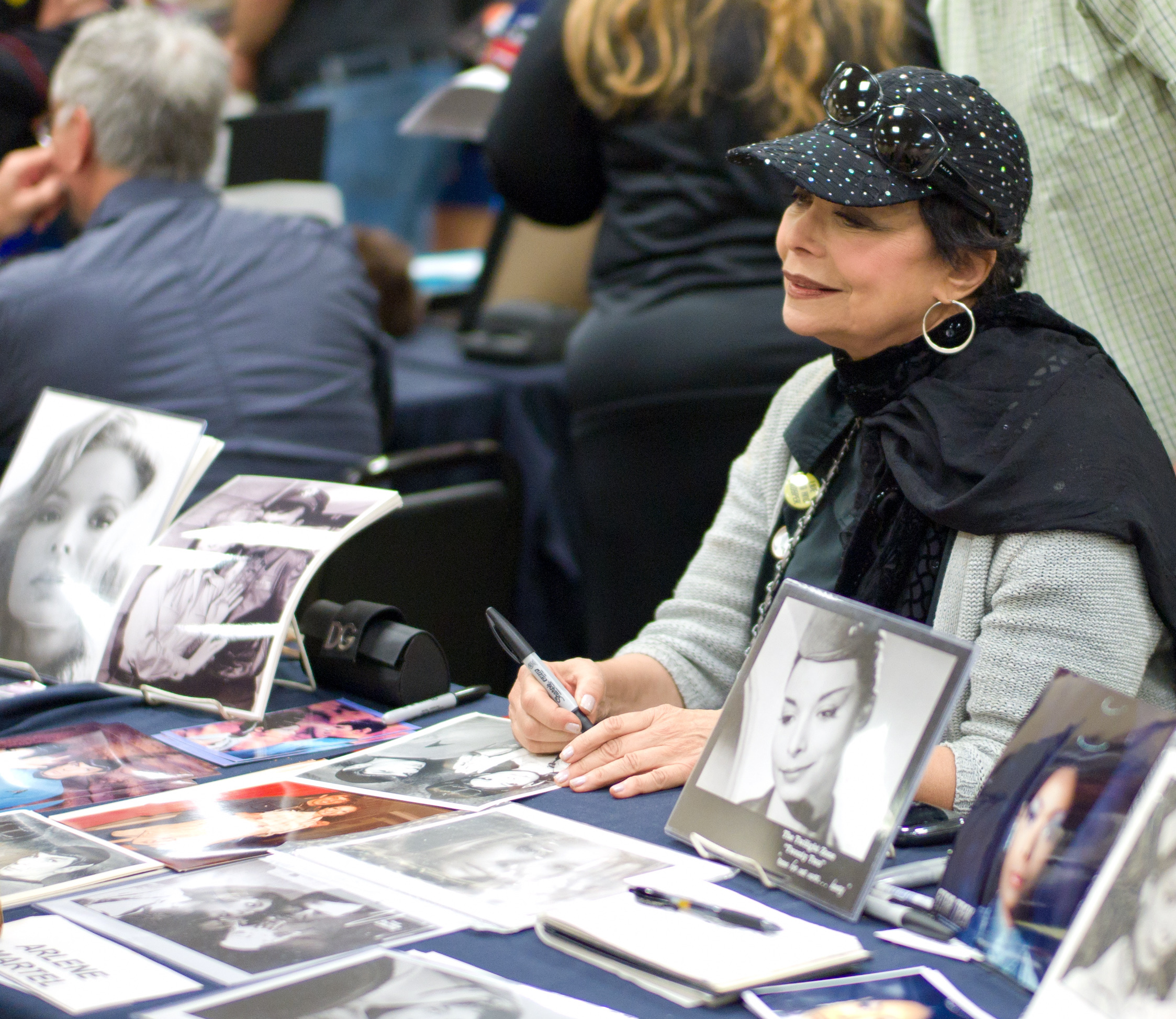
- Martel with photos of her various roles, at the 2011 Star Trek convention
- Born: Arline Greta Sax; April 14, 1936; The Bronx, New York, U.S.
- Died: August 12, 2014 (aged 78); Santa Monica, California, U.S.
- Occupations: Actress, screenwriter
- Years active: 1958–2013
- Notable work: T'Pring on Star Trek; Tiger on Hogan's Heroes
- Spouse(s): Boyd Holister; Jerry Douglas
- Children: Avra Douglas, Adam Palmer; grandchildren Molly Rose and Dashiell
- Website: arlenemartel.com

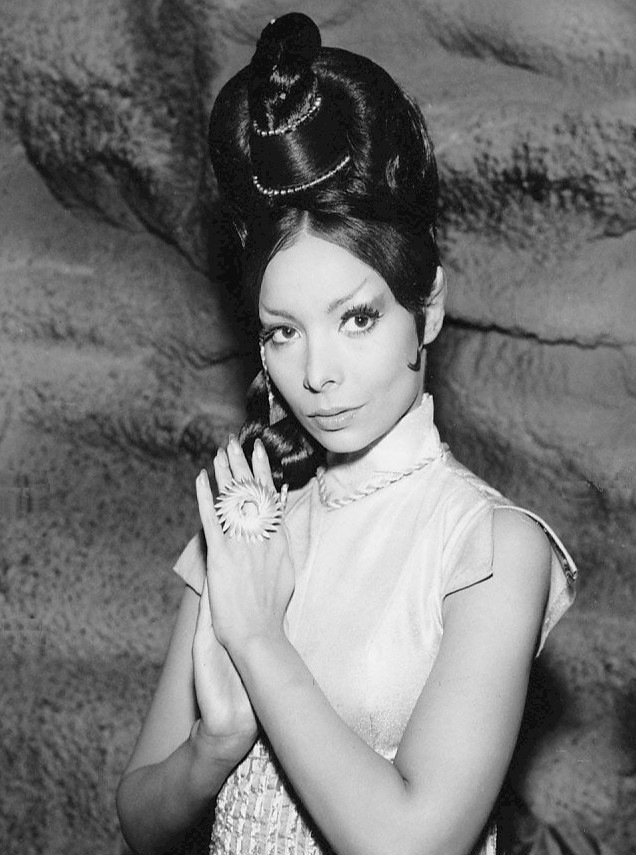
Martel as T'Pring from the Star Trek episode "Amok Time" (1967)

Arlene Martel (born Arline Greta Sax; April 14, 1936 – August 12, 2014) was an American actress. Before 1964, she was frequently billed as Arline Sax or Arlene Sax. Casting directors, among other Hollywood insiders, called Martel the Chameleon because her appearance and her proficiency with accents and dialects enabled her to portray characters of a wide range of races and ethnicities.

== Early life and education ==
Martel was born Arline Sax in the Bronx and attended the Performing Arts High School in New York.

== Career ==
Martel was billed as "Arline Sax" during the early years of her television career.

Two of her earliest appearances were in The Twilight Zone TV series. The first was the episode "What You Need" as a woman in the bar. The second was the episode "Twenty Two", as a nurse who repeatedly utters the sinister phrase "Room for one more, honey..." at the entrance to a hospital morgue and at the door of a doomed airplane.

Martel appeared in a 1960 episode of The Rebel, "The Hunted", in which she had a scene with Leonard Nimoy. She was also featured in two 1961 episodes of Route 66: "Legacy for Lucia", in which she had the title role of a Sicilian girl who inherits an American soldier's estate, and "The Newborn", in which she played a mother who dies in childbirth. She appeared in an episode of the TV series Hong Kong in 1961, opposite Rod Taylor.

In 1962, she made the first of two appearances on Perry Mason, as Fiona Cregan in "The Case of the Absent Artist". In 1966 she guest-starred as Sandra Dunkel in "The Case of the Dead Ringer", in which, aside from his role as Mason, Raymond Burr played the murderer, Grimes.

Other roles include the Princess Serafina on the Have Gun – Will Travel Season 4, Episode 19 "The Princess and the Gunfighter"(1960); a female cosmonaut on episode 13 of I Dream of Jeannie, "Russian Roulette" (1965); a Hungarian immigrant on The Fugitive episode "The Blessings of Liberty" (1966); the French Resistance contact Tiger in five episodes of Hogan's Heroes (1965–71); and the evil witch Malvina on the Bewitched episode "How Not to Lose Your Head to King Henry VIII (Part 1)" (1971).

Martel's science fiction roles include The Outer Limits episode "Demon with a Glass Hand" (1964) and the Star Trek episode "Amok Time" (1967) as the scheming and duplicitous, but extremely logical, T'Pring, who is betrothed to Mr. Spock (thus, cast again with Leonard Nimoy) and expected to become his consort. In 1973 Arlene played a movie actress turned princess on the 3rd episode of Banacek entitled "The Three Million Dollar Piracy".

On Columbo, Martel played Gloria West, the “pretend girlfriend” of the murder victim Tony Goodland (Bradford Dillman), in season 2, episode 2, "The Greenhouse Jungle" (1972), and the salesgirl in the episode "A Friend in Deed" (1974).

In 1977, she was billed as "Tasha Martell" for the role of secretary Marty Bach in The Rockford Files episode "Trouble in Chapter 17." She appeared as the title character in the Gunsmoke episode "The Squaw" (1975).

Other shows on which Martel appeared included The Restless Gun (episode "A Bell for Santo Domingo"), The Man from U.N.C.L.E., The Untouchables, Mission: Impossible, Here Come the Brides, The Wild Wild West, The Flying Nun, Battlestar Galactica, The Monkees, Mannix, The Rookies, and The Six Million Dollar Man. In the fourth season of Mission: Impossible she was reunited with Leonard Nimoy in the episode "Terror", where she played an imprisoned terrorist's ruthless wife.

Martel also appeared in feature films, including The Glass Cage (1964), in the starring role. In Angels from Hell (1968), she played the owner of a go-go bar frequented by members of a biker gang. She received top billing as the commandant in charge of a Russian road crew in Zoltan, Hound of Dracula (1978), although it was only a bit part, lasting less than five minutes.

Late-life roles included a Vulcan priestess in the Star Trek fan film "Of Gods and Men" in a scene with her "Amok Time" suitor Lawrence Montaigne reprising his role as Stonn, and as one of the narrators of the 2015 documentary film Unity, which was released a year after her death.

== Personal life and death ==
Martel was a regular at Star Trek conventions worldwide from 1972 to 2014. Her last convention appearance was at TrekTrax Atlanta in Atlanta, Georgia, on April 25–27, 2014, four months before her death.

Martel had breast cancer for the last five years of her life. On August 12, 2014, she died from complications of a heart attack at a hospital in Santa Monica, California. She was 78.

== Television ==
Year	Title	Role	Notes
1959	The Twilight Zone	Lady in a bar	Season 1 Episode 13: "What You Need"
1960	Have Gun Will Travel	Princess Serafina	Season 4 Episode 19: "The Princess and the Gunfighter"
1961	The Twilight Zone	Nurse/Stewardess	Season 2 Episode 17: "Twenty-Two"
1961	Hong Kong	Vera Graham	Season 1 Episode 20: "The Hunted"
1962	Perry Mason	Feona Cregan	"The Case of the Absent Artist"
1964	The Outer Limits	Consuelo Biros	Season 2 Episode 5: "Demon with a Glass Hand"
1965	I Dream of Jeannie	Female Cosmonaut	Season 1, Episode 13: "Russian Roulette"
1965	Hogan's Heroes	Tiger	Season 1 Episode 2: "Hold That Tiger"
1965	My Favorite Martian	Viola Normandy	Season 3 Episode 3 "Martin of the Movies"
1966	Perry Mason	Sandra Dunkel	"The Case of the Dead Ringer"
1966	The Monkees	Madame	Season 1 Episode 5: "The Spy Who Came in from the Cool"
1967	Hogan's Heroes	Tiger	“Heil Klink” Episode
1967	Star Trek	T'Pring	Season 2 Episode 1: "Amok Time"
1968	The Flying Nun	Manuela	Season 1 Episode 19: "Tonio's Mother"
1968	The Monkees	Lorelei	Season 2 Episode 18: "Monstrous Monkee Mash"
1968	Hogan's Heroes	Olga	Season 4 Episode 7: "Never Play Cards with Strangers"
1970	Hogan's Heroes	Tiger	Season 6 Episode 11: "Operation Tiger"
1970	Mannix	Valerie Price/Muriel Price	Season 3 Episode 23: "Murder Revisited"
1972	Columbo	Gloria West	Season 2 Episode 2: "The Greenhouse Jungle"
1972	McCloud	The Tour Guide	Season 2 Episode 12: "A Little Plot at Tranquil Valley"
1973	Banacek	Diana Maitland	Season 2 Episode 3: "The Three Million Dollar Piracy"
1974	Columbo	Salesgirl	Season 3 Episode 8: "A Friend in Deed"
1975	Gunsmoke	Quanah	Season 20 Episode 14: "The Squaw"
1977	The Rockford Files	Marty Bach	Season 4 Episode 2: "Trouble in Chapter 17"
1978	Battlestar Galactica	Adulteress 58	Season 1 Episode 7: "The Long Patrol"
1981	The Love Boat	Lisa Michelle	Season 4 Episode 19: "Return of the Ninny/Touchdown Twins/Split Personality"
