= Eddie Albert =

American actor (1906–2005)

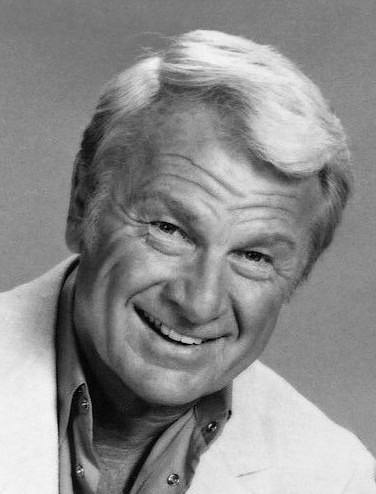
- Albert in 1975
- Born: Edward Albert Heimberger; April 22, 1906; Rock Island, Illinois, U.S.
- Died: May 26, 2005 (aged 99); Los Angeles, California, U.S.
- Resting place: Pierce Brothers Westwood Village Memorial Park and Mortuary
- Education: University of Minnesota
- Occupations: Actor; singer; humanitarian
- Years active: 1933–1997
- Spouse: Margo (m. 1945; died 1985)
- Children: 2, including Edward Albert
- Military career
- Allegiance: United States
- Branch: United States Coast Guard; United States Navy
- Service years: 1942–1945
- Rank: Lieutenant
- Conflicts: World War II: Battle of Tarawa
- Awards: Bronze Star Medal

Edward Albert Heimberger (April 22, 1906 – May 26, 2005) was an American actor. He is known for his roles on stage and screen and received nominations for two Academy Awards, a BAFTA Award, and two Golden Globe Awards.

Albert made his acting debut with the film Brother Rat (1938). He went on to receive two Academy Award for Best Supporting Actor nominations for his roles in Roman Holiday (1953) and The Heartbreak Kid (1972). His other notable films roles include Oklahoma! (1955), The Teahouse of the August Moon (1956), Captain Newman, M.D. (1963), The Longest Yard (1974), and Escape to Witch Mountain (1975).

He starred as Oliver Wendell Douglas in the television sitcom Green Acres from 1965 to 1971 and Return to Green Acres (1990). He played Frank MacBride in the crime drama series Switch from 1975 to 1978, and acted in Falcon Crest, The Carol Burnett Show and Columbo.

== Early life ==
Edward Albert Heimberger was born in Rock Island, Illinois on April 22, 1906, the eldest of the five children of real estate agent Frank Daniel Heimberger and his wife, Julia Jones. His birth year is often given as 1908, but this is incorrect. His parents were not married when Albert was born, and his mother altered his birth certificate after her marriage.

When he was one year old, his family moved to Minneapolis, Minnesota. Young Edward secured his first job as a newspaper boy when he was only six. During World War I, his German surname led to taunts as "the enemy" by his classmates. He studied at Central High School in Minneapolis and joined the drama club. His schoolmate Harriet Lake (later known as actress Ann Sothern) graduated in the same class. Finishing high school in 1926, he entered the University of Minnesota, where he majored in business. When he graduated, Albert embarked on a business career. However, the stock market crash in 1929 left him essentially unemployed. He then took odd jobs, working as a trapeze performer, an insurance salesman, and a nightclub singer. Albert stopped using his last name professionally because it invariably was mispronounced as "Hamburger".

== Career ==
=== 1933–1949: Early roles and military ===
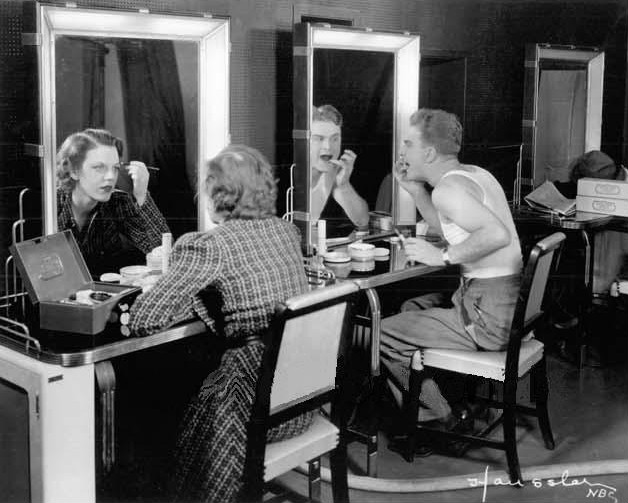
Albert and Grace Bradt applying makeup for their first early experimental TV appearance in November 1936

He moved to New York City in 1933, where he co-hosted a radio show, The Honeymooners – Grace and Eddie Show, which ran for three years. At the show's end, he was offered a film contract by Warner Bros. In the 1930s, Albert performed in Broadway stage productions, including Brother Rat, which opened in 1936. He had lead roles in Room Service (1937–1938) and The Boys from Syracuse (1938–1939). In 1936, Albert had also become one of the earliest television actors, performing live in one of RCA's first television broadcasts in association with NBC, a promotion for their New York City radio stations.

Performing regularly on early television, Albert wrote and performed in the first teleplay, titled The Love Nest, written for television. Done live (not recorded on film), this production took place November 6, 1936, and originated in Studio 3H (now 3K) in 30 Rockefeller Plaza at Rockefeller Center (then called the RCA Building) in New York City and was broadcast over NBC's experimental television station W2XBS (now WNBC-TV). Hosted by Betty Goodwin, The Love Nest starred Albert, Hildegarde, The Ink Spots, Ed Wynn, and actress Grace Bradt. Before this time, television productions were adaptations of stage plays. Albert landed the starring role in the 1938 Broadway musical The Boys from Syracuse, and met Burl Ives, who had a small role in the play. The two later briefly shared an apartment in the Beachwood Canyon community of Hollywood after Ives moved west the following year. Also in 1938, Albert made his feature-film debut in the Hollywood version of Brother Rat with Ronald Reagan and Jane Wyman, reprising his Broadway role as cadet "Bing" Edwards. The next year, he starred in On Your Toes, adapted for the screen from the Broadway smash by Rodgers and Hart.

==== Battle of Tarawa Bronze Star ====
On September 9, 1942, Albert enlisted in the United States Coast Guard and was discharged in 1943 to accept an appointment as a lieutenant in the U.S. Naval Reserve. He was awarded the Bronze Star with Combat "V" for his actions during the invasion of Tarawa in November 1943, when, as the coxswain of a U.S. Navy landing craft, he rescued 47 Marines who were stranded offshore (and supervised the rescue of 30 others), while under heavy enemy machine-gun fire. "...at the bloody Battle of Tarawa in the South Pacific, he found and rescued wounded soldiers who had been abandoned under heavy fire, transporting them to troop ships for treatment. Estimates credit him with pulling 70 men to safety."

==== Film work during war years ====
During the war years, Albert returned to films, starring in ones such as The Great Mr. Nobody, Lady Bodyguard, and Ladies' Day, as well as reuniting with Reagan and Wyman for An Angel from Texas and co-starring with Humphrey Bogart in The Wagons Roll at Night. After the war, he resumed appearing in leading roles, including 1947's Smash-Up, the Story of a Woman, with Susan Hayward. From 1948 on, Albert guest-starred in nearly 90 television series. He made his guest-starring debut on an episode of The Ford Theatre Hour. This part led to other roles such as Chevrolet Tele-Theatre, Suspense, Lights Out, Schlitz Playhouse of Stars, Studio One, The Philco Television Playhouse, Your Show of Shows, Front Row Center, The Alcoa Hour, and in dramatic series The Eleventh Hour, The Reporter, and General Electric Theater.

=== 1950–1969: Leading man roles ===
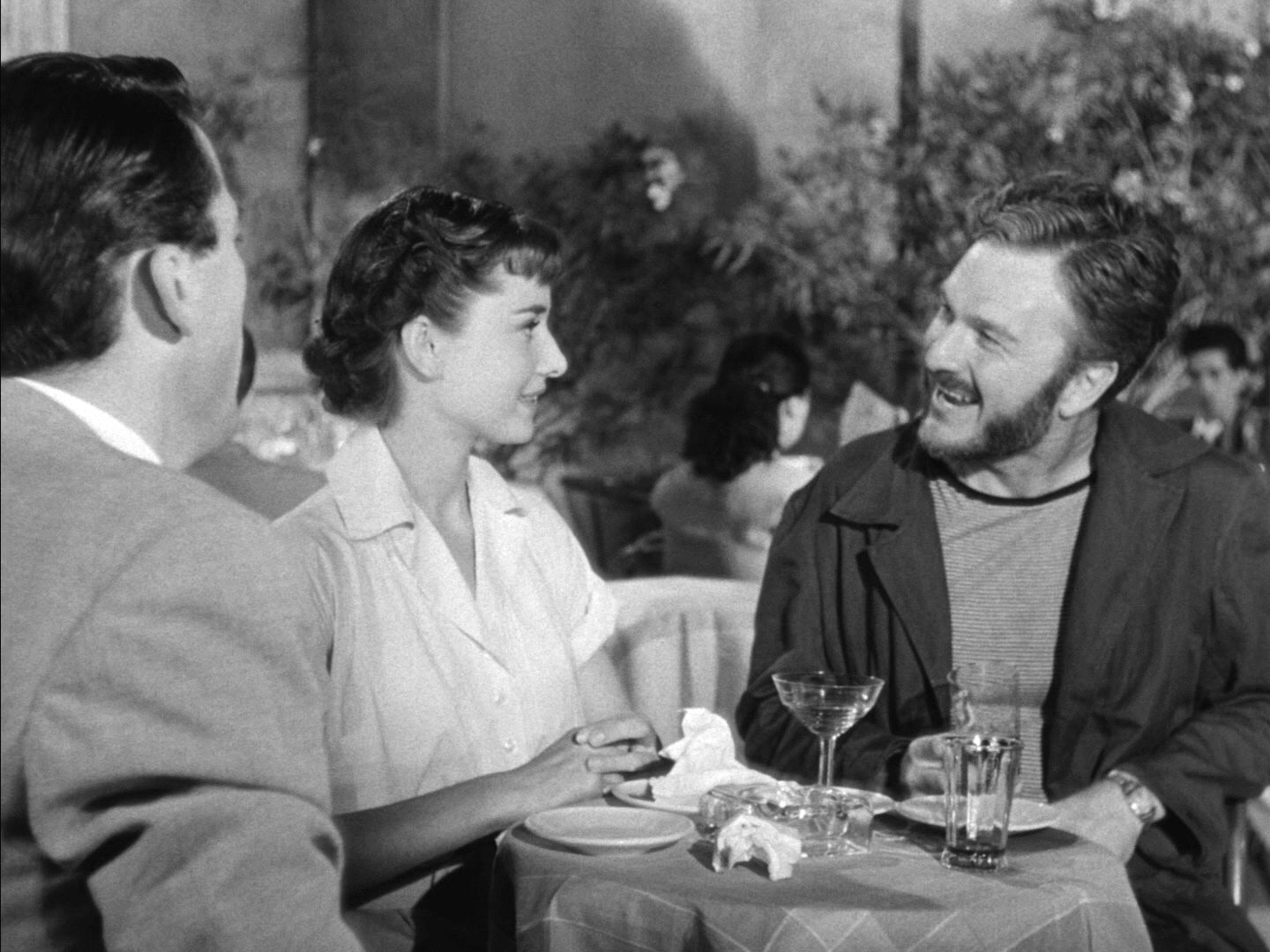
Gregory Peck, Audrey Hepburn, and Albert in Roman Holiday (1953)

In his first TV series, Albert portrayed Larry Tucker on the situation comedy Leave It to Larry, which ran from October 14, 1952, until December 23, 1952, on CBS. Tucker was a married man who encountered his father-in-law at work and at home. Albert had his own daytime variety program, The Eddie Albert Show, on CBS television in 1953. Singer Ellen Hanley was a regular on the show. A review in Broadcasting magazine panned the program, writing "Mr. Albert, with the help of Miss Hanley, conducts an interview, talks a little, sings a little, and looks all-thumbs a lot." Beginning June 12, 1954, Albert was host of Saturday Night Revue, which replaced Your Show of Shows on NBC. The 9:00–10:30 pm (Eastern Time) program also featured Ben Blue and Alan Young and the Sauter-Finegan Orchestra.

The 1950s also had a return to Broadway for Albert, including roles in Miss Liberty (1949–1950) and The Seven Year Itch (1952–1955). In 1959, Albert was cast as businessman Dan Simpson in the episode "The Unwilling" of the series Riverboat. In the story, Dan Simpson attempts to open a general store in the American West despite a raid from pirates on the Mississippi River, who stole from him $20,000 in merchandise. Debra Paget is cast in this episode as Lela Russell; Russell Johnson is Darius, and John M. Picard is uncredited as a river pirate. He guest-starred on various series, including ABC's The Pat Boone Chevy Showroom, and the Westinghouse Studio One series (CBS, 1953–54), playing Winston Smith in the first TV adaptation of 1984, by William Templeton.

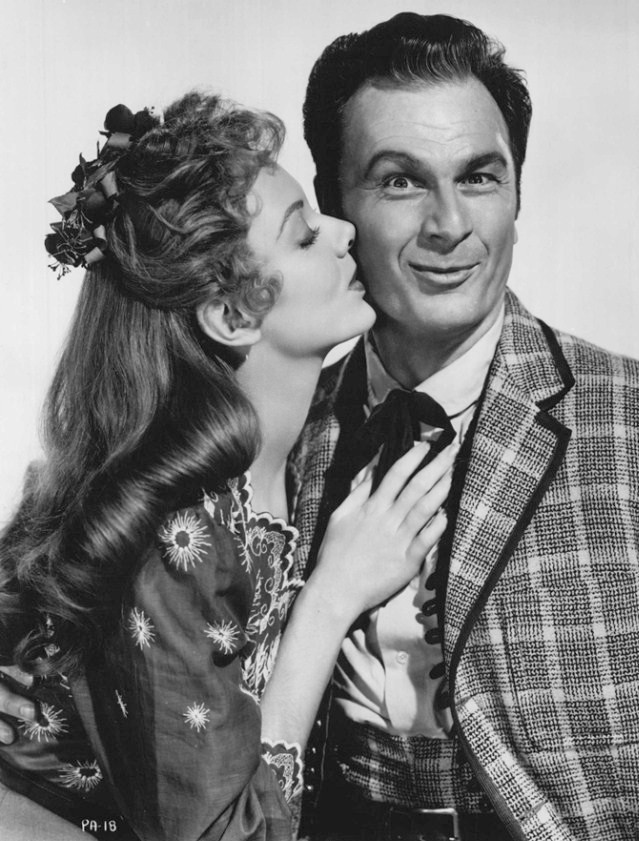
Barbara Lawrence and Albert in Oklahoma! (1955)

In the 1950s, Albert appeared in film roles such as that of Lucille Ball's fiancé in The Fuller Brush Girl (1950), Bill Gorton in The Sun Also Rises (1957), and a traveling salesman in Carrie (1952). He was nominated for his first Academy Award as Best Supporting Actor with Roman Holiday (1953). In Oklahoma! (1955), he played a womanizing Persian peddler, and in Who's Got the Action? (1962), he portrayed a lawyer helping his partner (Dean Martin) cope with a gambling addiction. In Teahouse of the August Moon (1956), he played a psychiatrist with an enthusiasm for farming. He appeared in several military roles, including The Longest Day (1962), about the Normandy invasion. The film Attack (1956) provided Albert with a dark role as a cowardly, psychotic Army captain whose behavior threatens the safety of his company. In a similar vein, he played a psychotic United States Army Air Force colonel in Captain Newman, M.D. (1963), with Gregory Peck. Albert acted in the 1956 special Our Mr. Sun opposite Dr. Frank Baxter directed by Frank Capra.

In 1960, Albert replaced Robert Preston in the lead role of Professor Harold Hill, in the Broadway production of The Music Man. Albert also performed in regional theater. He created the title role of Marc Blitzstein's Reuben, Reuben in 1955 in Boston. He performed at The Muny Theater in St. Louis, Missouri, reprising the Harold Hill role in The Music Man in 1966 and playing Alfred P. Doolittle in My Fair Lady in 1968. In 1962, Albert appeared as Cal Kroeger on the TV Western The Virginian in the episode titled "Impasse". In 1964, Albert guest-starred in "Cry of Silence", an episode of the science-fiction television series The Outer Limits. Albert played Andy Thorne, who along with his wife Karen (played by June Havoc), had decided to leave the city and buy a farm (a recurring theme in Albert's career). They find themselves lost and in the middle of a deserted valley, where they come under attack by a series of tumbleweeds, frogs, and rocks.

Also in 1964, he guest-starred as a government agent in the pilot episode of Voyage to the Bottom of the Sea titled "Eleven Days to Zero". Albert appeared as Taylor Dickson, a western photographer in season seven, episode 11 as “The Photographer” in Rawhide, alongside Clint Eastwood (Rowdy Yates) aired December 11, 1964.

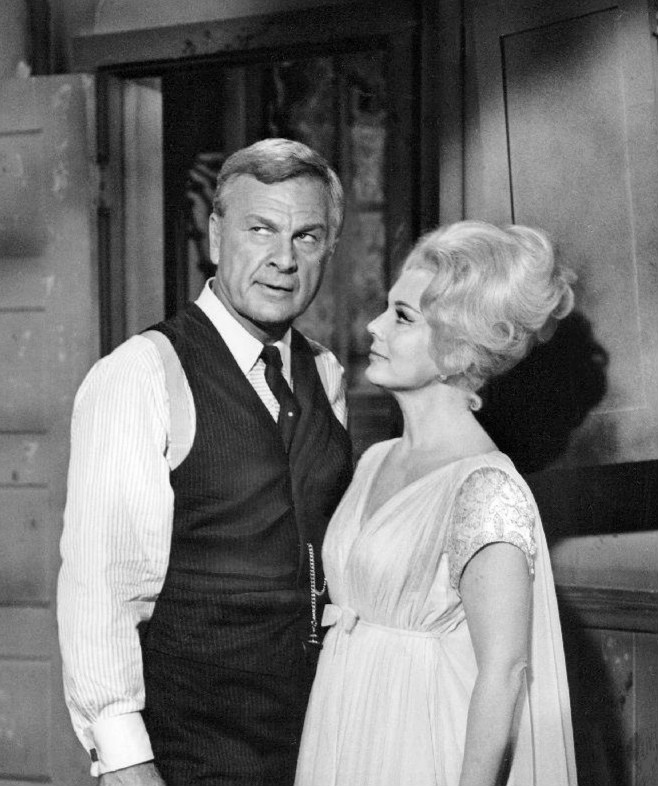
Albert and Eva Gabor on Green Acres

Albert was cast as Charlie O'Rourke in the 1964 episode "Visions of Sugar Plums" of the NBC education drama series, Mr. Novak, starring James Franciscus. Bobby Diamond, formerly of the Fury series, also appeared in this episode.

In 1965, Albert was approached by producer Paul Henning to star in a sitcom for CBS titled Green Acres. His character, Oliver Wendell Douglas, was a lawyer who left the city to enjoy a simple life as a gentleman farmer. Co-starring on the show was Eva Gabor as his wife Lisa. The show was an immediate hit, achieving fifth place in the ratings in its first season. The series lasted six seasons with 170 episodes.

In 1968, Albert was a guest on The Carol Burnett Show episode six. He played Harvey Korman's boss in an episode of "Carol and Sis", and sang.

=== 1970–1995: Established actor ===
After a four-year absence from the small screen, and upon reaching age 69 in 1975, Albert signed a new contract with Universal Television, and starred in the popular 1970s series Switch for CBS as a retired police officer, Frank McBride, who goes to work as a private detective with a former criminal he had once jailed. In its first season, Switch was a hit. By late 1976, the show had become a more serious and traditional crime drama. At the end of its third season in 1978, ratings began to drop, and the show was cancelled after 70 episodes. In 1965, the year that Green Acres premiered, Albert served as host/narrator for the telecast of a German-American made-for-television film version of The Nutcracker, which was rerun several times. The host sequences and the narration were especially filmed for English-language telecasts of this short film (it was only an hour in length, and cut much from the Tchaikovsky ballet). In 1968, he voiced Myles Standish in the Rankin/Bass animated TV special The Mouse on the Mayflower.

In 1971, Albert guest-starred in a season-one Columbo episode titled "Dead Weight" as a highly decorated retired US Marine Corps major general, and combat war hero from the Korean War, who murders his adjutant to cover up an illegal contracting conspiracy scheme. In 1972, Albert resumed his film career and was nominated for an Oscar for Best Supporting Actor for his performance as an overprotective father in The Heartbreak Kid (1972), and delivered a memorable performance as an evil prison warden in 1974's The Longest Yard. In a lighter vein, Albert portrayed the gruff though soft-hearted Jason O'Day in the successful Disney film Escape to Witch Mountain in 1975.

Albert appeared in such 1980s films as How to Beat the High Cost of Living (1980), Yesterday (1981), Take This Job and Shove It (1981), Rooster (1982 television film), and Yes, Giorgio (1982), and as the US president in Dreamscape (1984). His final film role was a cameo in The Big Picture (1989). He also appeared in many all-star television miniseries, including Evening in Byzantium (1978), The Word (1978), Peter and Paul (1981), Goliath Awaits (1981), and War and Remembrance (1988). In 1982, Albert sang the character role of the elderly Emperor Altoum in the San Francisco Opera staging of Puccini's Turandot. In the mid-1980s, Albert was reunited with longtime friend and co-star of the Brother Rat and An Angel from Texas films, Jane Wyman, in a recurring role as the villainous Carlton Travis in the popular 1980s series Falcon Crest. He also guest-starred on an episode of the 1980s television series Highway to Heaven, as well as Murder, She Wrote, and in 1990, he reunited with Eva Gabor for a Return to Green Acres. In 1993, he guest-starred for several episodes on the daytime soap opera General Hospital as Jack Boland, and he made a guest appearance on the Golden Girls spin-off The Golden Palace the same year.

== Hollywood blacklist ==
Eddie Albert's wife, Mexican actress Margo, was well known in Hollywood for her left-wing political leanings, but she was not a member of the Communist Party. In 1950, Margo and Albert's names were both published in "Red Channels", an anti-Communist pamphlet that sought to expose purported Communist influence within the entertainment industry. This was part of a larger trend of blacklisting motion-picture professionals with known or suspected Communist leanings, unless they testified before the House Un-American Activities Committee to disavow any Communist affiliations.

Albert's son spoke of his parents' blacklisting in an interview published in December 1972, crediting Albert's military service during World War II with ultimately saving his career:

My mom was blacklisted for appearing at an anti-Franco rally; she was branded a Communist, was spat upon in the streets, and had to have a bodyguard. And my dad found himself unemployable at several major studios, just when his career was gathering momentum. During the Second World War, dad joined the Navy and saw action at Tarawa, and because he came back something of a hero, he was able to get work again, but he never got as far as he should have gotten.

Albert later spoke of this period: "Everyone was so full of fear. Many people couldn't support their families, or worse, their lives were ruined and they had to go out and do menial jobs. Some even killed themselves." While Albert's career survived the blacklist, his wife, Margo, had extreme difficulty finding work.

== Personal life ==
=== Marriage and family ===
Albert married Mexican actress Margo (née María Margarita Guadalupe Teresa Estela Bolado Castilla y O'Donnell) in 1945. Albert and Margo had a son, Edward Jr., also an actor, and adopted a daughter, Maria, who became her father's business manager. Margo Albert died from brain cancer on July 17, 1985. The Alberts lived in Pacific Palisades, California, in a Spanish-style house on an acre of land with a cornfield in front. Albert grew organic vegetables in a greenhouse and recalled how his parents had a liberty garden at home during World War I.

Albert's son, Edward Jr. (1951–2006), was an actor, musician, singer, and linguist/dialectician. Edward Jr. died at age 55, one year after his father. He had been suffering from lung cancer for 18 months.

=== Activism and interests ===
Albert was active in social and environmental causes, especially from the 1970s onward. In 1970, Albert participated in the creation of Earth Day and spoke at one of its events in that year.

Albert founded the Eddie Albert World Trees Foundation and was national chairman for the Boy Scouts of America's conservation program. He was a trustee of the National Recreation and Park Association and a member of the U.S. Department of Energy's advisory board. TV Guide called him "an ecological Paul Revere".

He was special envoy for Meals for Millions, consultant for the World Hunger Conference, and he joined Albert Schweitzer in a documentary about African malnutrition. He fought agricultural and industrial pollution, particularly DDT. Albert promoted organic gardening, and founded City Children's Farms for inner-city children, while supporting eco-farming and tree planting. Albert was also a director of the U.S. Council on Refugees.

Beginning in the 1940s, Eddie Albert Productions produced films for various U.S. corporations, as well as documentaries such as Human Beginnings (a for-its-time controversial sex-education film) and Human Growth.

In 1971 he starred in an industrial film sponsored and promoted by a major logging and forest products concern called Weyerhaeuser Company. which emphasized the Pacific Northwest. Shot partly amid old growth timber and narrated solely by Albert, the film documented industrial methods of handling such trees for market. It also shows re-planted clear cuts and emphasized "the need for advanced lumber production in response to rapidly increasing population," according to the Texas Archive of the Moving Image.

=== Illness and death ===
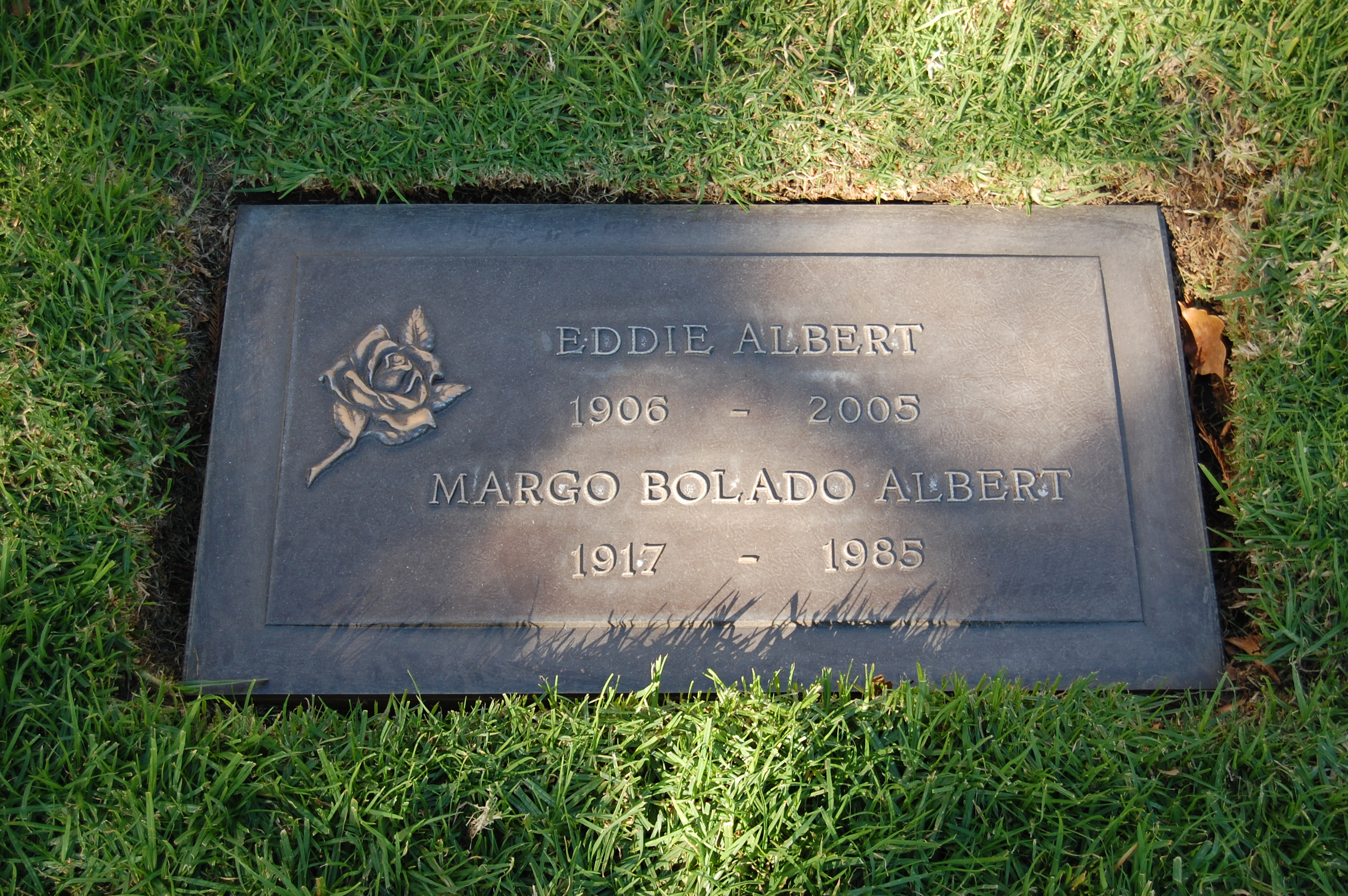
Albert's grave

Albert was diagnosed with Alzheimer's disease in 1995. His son put aside his acting career to care for his father. Albert exercised regularly until shortly before his death. Eddie Albert died of pneumonia on May 26, 2005, at the age of 99 in his home in Pacific Palisades, California. He is interred at Westwood Village Memorial Park Cemetery, next to his late wife and near his Green Acres co-star Eva Gabor. For contributions to the television industry, Eddie Albert was honored on February 8, 1960, with a star on the Hollywood Walk of Fame at 6441 Hollywood Boulevard.

== Acting credits ==
=== Film ===
Film appearances of Eddie Albert
Year	Title	Role	Notes
1938	Brother Rat	"Bing" Edwards	Film debut
1939	On Your Toes	Phil Dolan Jr.	
1939	Four Wives	Dr. Clinton Forrest Jr.	
1940	Brother Rat and a Baby	"Bing" Edwards	
1940	An Angel from Texas	Peter Coleman	
1940	My Love Came Back	Dusty Rhodes	
1940	A Dispatch from Reuter's	Max Wagner	
1941	Four Mothers	Clinton Forrest Jr.	
1941	The Great Mr. Nobody	Robert "Dreamy" Smith	
1941	The Wagons Roll at Night	Matt Varney	
1941	Thieves Fall Out	Eddie Barnes	
1941	Out of the Fog	George Watkins	
1942	Treat 'Em Rough	Bill Kingsford / The Panama Kid	
1942	Eagle Squadron	Leckie	
1943	Lady Bodyguard	Terry Moore	
1943	Ladies' Day	Wacky Waters	
1943	Bombardier	Tom Hughes	
1946	Strange Voyage	Chris Thompson	
1946	Rendezvous with Annie	Cpl. Jeffrey Dolan	
1947	The Perfect Marriage	Gil Cummins	
1947	Smash-Up: The Story of a Woman	Steve Nelson	
1947	Hit Parade of 1947	Kip Walker	
1947	Time Out of Mind	Jake Bullard	
1947	Unconquered	Barker	Scenes deleted
1948	The Dude Goes West	Daniel Bone	
1948	You Gotta Stay Happy	Bullets Baker	
1948	Every Girl Should Be Married	Harry Proctor/"Old" Joe	Cameo; uncredited
1950	The Fuller Brush Girl	Humphrey Briggs	
1951	You're in the Navy Now	Lt. Bill Baron	
1951	Meet Me After the Show	Chris Leeds	
1952	Actors and Sin	Orlando Higgens	
1952	Carrie	Charles Drouet	
1953	Roman Holiday	Irving Radovich	
1955	The Girl Rush	Elliot Atterbury	
1955	Oklahoma!	Ali Hakim	
1955	I'll Cry Tomorrow	Burt McGuire	
1956	Attack!	Capt. Erskine Cooney	
1956	The Teahouse of the August Moon	Capt. McLean	
1957	The Sun Also Rises	Bill Gorton	
1957	The Joker Is Wild	Austin Mack	
1958	Orders to Kill	Major MacMahon	
1958	The Gun Runners	Hanagan	
1958	The Roots of Heaven	Abe Fields	
1959	Beloved Infidel	Bob Carter	
1961	Madison Avenue	Harvey Holt Ames	
1961	The Young Doctors	Dr. Charles Dornberger	
1962	The Two Little Bears	Harry Davis	
1962	The Longest Day	Col. Thompson	
1962	Who's Got the Action?	Clint Morgan	
1963	Miracle of the White Stallions	Rider Otto	
1963	Captain Newman, M.D.	Col. Norval Algate Bliss	
1965	The Party's Over	Ben	
1966	7 Women	Charles Pether	
1972	The Heartbreak Kid	Mr. Corcoran	
1973	The Borrowers	Pod Clock	
1974	McQ	Kosterman	
1974	The Take	Chief Berrigan	
1974	The Longest Yard	Warden Hazen	
1975	Escape to Witch Mountain	Jason O'Day	
1975	The Devil's Rain	Dr. Sam Richards	
1975	Whiffs	Colonel Lockyer	
1975	Hustle	Leo Sellers	
1976	Birch Interval	Pa Strawacher	
1976	Moving Violation	Alex Warren	
1979	The Concorde... Airport '79	Eli Sands	
1979	Border Cop	Moffat	
1980	How to Beat the High Co$t of Living	Max	
1980	Foolin' Around	Daggett	
1981	Yesterday	Bart Kramer	
1981	Take This Job and Shove It	Samuel Ellison	
1982	Yes, Giorgio	Henry Pollack	
1984	The Act	Harry Kruger	
1984	Dreamscape	The President	
1985	Stitches	Dean Bradley	
1985	Head Office	Pete Helmes	
1987	Turnaround	Theo	
1989	The Big Picture	M.C.	Cameo
1989	Brenda Starr	Police Chief Maloney	
1994	Death Valley Memories	Narrator	Documentary
1994	Headless!	Sheriff George	Short film

=== Television ===
Television appearances of Eddie Albert
Year	Title	Role	Notes
1952	Leave It to Larry	Larry Tucker	TV series
1953	Westinghouse Studio One	Winston	Episode: "1984"
1955	A Connecticut Yankee	Martin Barret	Teleplay (live)
1955	The Chocolate Soldier	Bumerli	Teleplay (live)
1957–1962	Wagon Train	Kurt Davos / Frank Elgin	2 episodes
1959	Laramie		episode 2
1959	The Ballad of Louie the Louse	Paul Hughes	Television film
1961	Tales of Wells Fargo	Bonzo Croydon	Episode: "A Fistful of Pride"
1963	General Hospital	Jack Boland	TV series
1963	Combat!	Phil	Episode: "Doughboy"
1964	Voyage to the Bottom of the Sea	Dr. Fred Wilson	Episode: “11 Days to Zero”
1965–1971	Green Acres	Oliver Wendell Douglas	Main role; 170 episodes
1968	The Mouse on the Mayflower	Capt. Standish	Television film
1971	Columbo	Major General Martin Hollister	Episode: "Dead Weight"
1971	See the Man Run	Dr. Thomas Spencer	Television film
1972	The Lorax	Narrator	Animated television special
1975	Promise Him Anything	Pop	Television film
1975–1978	Switch	Frank MacBride	Main role; 71 episodes
1978	Evening in Byzantium	Brian Murphy	Television film
1978	Crash	Capt. Dunn	Television film
1978	The Word	Ogden Towery	TV miniseries
1981	The Oklahoma City Dolls	Coach Homer Sixx	Television film
1981	Peter and Paul	Porcius Festus	TV miniseries
1981	Goliath Awaits	Adm. Wiley Sloan	Television film
1982	Beyond Witch Mountain	Jason O'Day	Television film
1982	Rooster	Rev. Harlan Barnum	Television film
1983	The Demon Murder Case	Father Dietrich	Television film
1984	Burning Rage	Will Larson	Television film
1986	Dress Gray	Judge Hand	TV miniseries
1986	Highway to Heaven	Corky McCorkindale	Episode: "Jonathan Smith Goes to Washington"
1987	Mercy or Murder?	Joe Varon	Television film
1987	Falcon Crest	Carlton Travis	4 episodes
1988	War and Remembrance	Breckinridge Long	TV miniseries; Part VI
1988	The Twilight Zone	Roger Leeds	Episode: "Dream Me a Life"
1988	Murder, She Wrote	Jackson Lane	Episode: "The Body Politic"
1989	Thirtysomething	Charlie Weston	Episode: "Elliot's Dad"
1990	Return to Green Acres	Oliver Wendell Douglas	Television film
1991	The Girl from Mars	Dr. Charles Favender	Television film
1993	Time Trax	Noah	Episode: "Treasure of the Ages"
1993	General Hospital	Jack Boland	2 episodes
1993	The Jackie Thomas Show	Eddie Albert	Episode: "One Flu Over the Cuckoo's Nest"
1993	The Golden Palace	Bill Douglas	Episode: "Say Goodbye Rose"
1993	Okavango: The Wild Frontier	Uncle Bill	13 episodes
1995	The Barefoot Executive	Herbert Gower	Television film
1996–1997	Spider-Man: The Animated Series	Elderly Adrian Toomes/Vulture	Voice; 3 episodes
1997	Extreme Ghostbusters	Old Ben	Voice; Episode: "The Jersey Devil"

=== Theater ===
Theatre credits
Year	Title	Role	Venue	Ref.
1936	O Evening Star	Ben Martin	Empire Theatre, Broadway	
1936	Brother Rat	Bing Edwards	Biltmore Theatre, Broadway	
1937	Room Service	Leo Davis	Cort Theatre, Broadway	
1938	The Boys from Syracuse	Antipholus of Syracuse	Alvin Theatre, Broadway	
1949	Miss Liberty	Horace Miller	Imperial Theatre, Broadway	
1952	The Seven Year Itch	Richard Sherman (replacement)	Fulton Theatre, Broadway	
1957	The Music Man	Harold Hill (replacement)	Majestic Theatre, Broadway	
1958	Say, Darling	Jack Darling (replacement)	ANTA Theatre, Broadway	
1976	No Hard Feelings	George Bartlett	Martin Beck Theatre, Broadway	
1983	You Can't Take It With You	Martin Vanderhof (replacement)	Plymouth Theatre, Broadway	

== Awards and nominations ==
Year	Association	Category	Project	Result	Ref.
1953	Academy Awards	Best Supporting Actor	Roman Holiday	Nominated	
1954	BAFTA Award	Best Foreign Actor	Roman Holiday	Nominated	
1956	Golden Globe Awards	Best Supporting Actor	The Teahouse of the August Moon	Nominated	
1972	Academy Awards	Best Supporting Actor	The Heartbreak Kid	Nominated	
1972	National Society of Film Critics	Best Supporting Actor	The Heartbreak Kid	Won	
1972	New York Film Critics Circle	Best Supporting Actor	The Heartbreak Kid	Nominated	
1974	Golden Globe Awards	Best Supporting Actor	The Longest Yard	Nominated	
