= Hai! (Live in Japan) =

Live album by Cabaret Voltaire
- Released: 1982
- Recorded: March 23, 1982
- Venue: Tsubaki House, Tokyo
- Genre: Industrial
- Length: 45:27
- Label: Rough Trade Deutschland RTD-1
- Producer: Cabaret Voltaire

Cabaret Voltaire chronology
2x45 (1982)	Hai! (Live in Japan) (1982)	The Crackdown (1983)

Professional ratings
Review scores
Source	Rating
The Encyclopedia of Popular Music	3/5 stars
The Rolling Stone Album Guide	2.5/5 stars
Sounds	1/5 stars
Spin Alternative Record Guide	6/10

Hai! (Live in Japan) is a 1982 live album by the U.K. industrial band Cabaret Voltaire. It was recorded at the Tsubaki House in Tokyo, Japan on 23 March 1982, and was released on CD in 1991 by Mute Records Ltd. The original master tapes being lost, the CD was transferred from a vinyl copy (unfortunately, a US pressing was used, with significantly poorer sound and more surface noise than a Japanese original).

The performance on the album reflected the band's move towards a more funk-oriented sound. Alan Fish had joined the band by this time on drums and percussion, replacing Chris Watson.

The album reached number five in the UK Indie Chart in 1982.

== Track listing ==
Side A:

1. "Walls of Kyoto" - 7:50
2. "3 Days Monk" - 7:03
3. "Yashar" (Version) - 6:59

Side B:

1. "Over & Over" - 4:53
2. "Diskono" - 7:01
3. "Taxi Music" (Version) - 11:41

== Personnel ==
Cabaret Voltaire

- Stephen Mallinder - vocals, bass guitar
- Richard H. Kirk - guitar, clarinet, synthesizer, tapes
- Alan Fish - drums, percussion
