= Yashar (song) =

- Factory Benelux sleeve (FBN-25)

Single by Cabaret Voltaire

from the album 2x45
- B-side: Yashar 7:20
- Released: May 1983
- Genre: Industrial
- Length: 5:00
- Label: Factory Benelux FBN 25; Factory FAC 82
- Songwriters: Richard H. Kirk, Stephen Mallinder, Chris Watson

Alternative cover
- Factory UK sleeve (FAC-82) — generic red sleeve with "Yashar" sticker

Alternative cover
- Mute NovaMute 12-NoMu-121 sleeve

"Yashar" is a song by English industrial band Cabaret Voltaire. It first appeared on their 1982 album 2x45; two remixes by John Robie were released on a single the following year. A version of the song also appears on the live album Hai! (Live in Japan).

The single was released in May 1983 on Factory Benelux (FBN 25) and Factory Records UK (FAC 82). It reached No. 6 on the UK Indie Chart.

The track features a sample of dialogue ("The 70 billion people of Earth — where are they hiding?") from The Outer Limits episode "Demon with a Glass Hand".

As well as the 5:00 and 7:20 versions on the single, a 6:36 version was released on the 1983 compilation LP Factory Benelux Greatest Hits.

Further remixes of the track were released on Mute Records' NovaMute imprint in 2003 (12", NovaMute 12-NoMu-121, 9 June 2003).
