= What You Need (The Twilight Zone) =

- The Twilight Zone episode
- Episode no.: Season 1 Episode 12
- Directed by: Alvin Ganzer
- Teleplay by: Rod Serling
- Based on: "What You Need" by Lewis Padgett
- Production code: 173-3622
- Original air date: December 25, 1959

Guest appearances
- Steve Cochran as Fred Renard; Ernest Truex as Pedott; Arline Sax as Girl in Bar; Read Morgan as Lefty

Episode chronology
← Previous "And When the Sky Was Opened"	Next → "The Four of Us Are Dying"
- The Twilight Zone (1959 TV series, season 1)

"What You Need" is the twelfth episode of the American television anthology series The Twilight Zone, airing on Christmas Day, 1959. It is based on the short story of the same name by Lewis Padgett (Henry Kuttner and C. L. Moore), which was published in the October 1945 issue of Astounding Science Fiction magazine.

== Opening narration ==
You're looking at Mr. Fred Renard, who carries on his shoulder a chip the size of the national debt. This is a sour man, a friendless man, a lonely man, a grasping, compulsive, nervous man. This is a man who has lived thirty-six undistinguished, meaningless, pointless, failure-laden years and who at this moment looks for an escape—any escape, any way, anything, anybody—to get out of the rut. And this little old man is just what Mr. Renard is waiting for.

== Plot ==
A peddler named Pedott carries a case of items from which he can give people what they need before they need it. Entering a bar, he gives a woman a vial of cleaning fluid and an impoverished ex-baseball player a bus ticket to Scranton, Pennsylvania. Moments later, the latter receives a telephone call inviting him to accept a coaching position for a team in Scranton. When he notices a spot on his jacket that he wishes to remove before heading there, the woman with the cleaning fluid helps him scrub it off and the pair depart for the bus station, having become attracted to each other.

Spying what happened, a frustrated, arrogant, and unsuccessful man named Fred Renard asks Pedott to give him what he needs and receives a pair of scissors. Renard soon uses them to cut himself free after his scarf gets caught in a set of elevator doors. When he again demands something he needs from Pedott, he receives a leaky fountain pen, which predicts a winning racehorse after its last drop of ink falls on a newspaper racing column. Unable to use the pen to predict any further winners, Renard angrily confronts Pedott, who reveals that he only provides items that people need to use once and that he cannot supply things such as serenity and peace of mind.

Renard demands Pedott provide him another thing he needs, causing the latter to nervously glance at his case. Assuming the glance has indicated what he needs, Renard seizes a pair of shoes from the case and puts them on, only to find that they are too tight and have slippery soles. When Pedott says that they are actually what the former needs, Renard advances on him but slips on wet pavement and is killed by a car. Pedott then reveals he had foreseen his own death and allowed Renard to steal the shoes to prevent it. A short time later the police and onlookers gather around to see Renard's body being removed from the scene. As Peddott leaves, he gives a comb to a man, who uses it to neaten his hair before he and his wife are photographed for a news story on the accident.

== Closing narration ==
Street scene, night. Traffic accident. Victim named Fred Renard, gentleman with a sour face to whom contentment came with difficulty. Fred Renard, who took all that was needed—in The Twilight Zone.

== Production information ==
The original story featured a machine that could foretell an individual's probable future. In the story, the man owns a shop where he has such a machine and then gives people what they need to provide the best possible outcomes; also, the Renard character is killed not by a car but by falling off a subway platform while a train is coming into the station. This version of the story aired on a 1952 episode of the anthology series Tales of Tomorrow, changing the death of the Renard character from a fall to being hit by a car. For his version, Serling replaced the science-fiction element with a street peddler who could magically perform the same function.

The final shot before the first commercial (while Serling is concluding his narration) is actually played backwards; looking carefully, one can see smoke returning to Renard's cigarette.

During the scene in Mr. Renard's hotel room, a bellhop brings him a newspaper. Renard then opens it and spreads it out on the floor. The movement is quick, but the front page of the newspaper is visible, indicating that it is the same front page used in another Twilight Zone episode, "Time Enough at Last". The headline reads "H-Bomb Capable of Total Destruction". Once Renard opens the paper and looks at the racing page, several in-jokes or Easter eggs are apparent in the names of the listed jockeys, which include "Serling", "Clemens" (referencing director of photography George Clemens), "Houghton" (referencing producer Buck Houghton), "Butler" (referencing set decorator Rudy Butler), and "Denault" (referencing assistant director Edward Denault).

== Sources ==
- Zicree, Marc Scott: The Twilight Zone Companion. Sillman-James Press, 1982 (second edition)
- DeVoe, Bill. (2008). Trivia from The Twilight Zone. Albany, GA: Bear Manor Media. ISBN 978-1-59393-136-0
- Grams, Martin. (2008). The Twilight Zone: Unlocking the Door to a Television Classic. Churchville, MD: OTR Publishing. ISBN 978-0-9703310-9-0
