= Cry of Silence =

- The Outer Limits episode
- Episode no.: Season 2 Episode 6
- Directed by: Charles Haas
- Story by: Louis Charbonneau
- Teleplay by: Robert C. Dennis
- Cinematography by: Kenneth Peach
- Production code: 42
- Original air date: October 24, 1964

Guest appearances
- Eddie Albert; June Havoc

Episode chronology
← Previous "Demon with a Glass Hand"	Next → "The Invisible Enemy"

"Cry of Silence" is an episode of the original Outer Limits. It first aired on October 24, 1964, during the second season. Directed by Charles Haas, it was written by Robert C. Dennis based on a story by Louis Charbonneau. The episode was originally titled "Mind Over Matter".

== Opening narration ==
"In the not-distant future, the sound of Man will invade those unknown depths of space which as yet we cannot even imagine. In his own world there are no places left beyond the reach of his voice. His neighbor is no longer just next door, but anywhere at the end of a wire. And it all began when prehistoric man discovered the art of communication..."

== Plot ==
A city couple driving in the countryside make a turn into a mysterious valley road where their car hits a rock and stops working. After the couple leave their car, the wife has a slight accident in which she rolls downhill and sprains her ankle. When the husband reaches her, they realise they are being stalked and attacked by tumbleweeds which appear to be possessed by some form of energy. At first they attempt to keep the tumbleweeds at bay with fire, but soon run out of firewood.

At this point they are saved by a severely disturbed (possibly schizophrenic) farmer named Lamont, who explains that things have been awkward in the valley ever since a "meteor" landed two weeks before, causing his farm to be destroyed. Lamont tells them he stayed merely out of curiosity, but now the possessed weeds, trees and rocks won't allow him to leave either. The three make their way to Lamont's house where they spend a frightening night surrounded by tumbleweeds first, and then thousands of frogs. The wife discovers Lamont's diary containing eloquent and intelligent passages regarding his awareness of an apparent alien presence. In the morning, they walk back to the car without trouble, only to be attacked by living rocks once they get there. One rock apparently kills Lamont. The couple run back to the farmhouse, where Lamont eventually returns and sits down in a chair, remaining motionless, speechless and in a trance-like state, with the couple trying to rouse him, and then realizing that he has been possessed by an unknown entity. The husband then decides that the only way they are ever to escape is to attempt to communicate with whatever is behind the possessions. The husband manages to make contact through self-hypnosis, and is briefly possessed by what appears to be a non-corporeal alien mind that came to Earth out of mere curiosity, but failed to establish communication. The extraterrestrial presence bemoans its vain attempt at communicating with humans and eventually departs after transmitting the idea that mankind perhaps needs more time to evolve in order to communicate with it. After its departure, everything returns to normal, allowing the couple to return to their car. On their way home, the husband compassionately philosophises that, while both of them are only a few miles away from their home, the alien intelligence must be far further from its own.

== Closing narration ==
"'And the light shineth in the darkness, and the darkness comprehended it not.' The sound of Man probes the dimensionless range of space, seeking an answer. But if it comes, will he hear? Will he listen? Will he comprehend?"

The beginning is a quote from John 1:5.

== Cast ==
The cast and stunt performers are as follows:

- Eddie Albert – as Andy Thorne
- June Havoc – as Karen Thorne
- Arthur Hunnicutt – as Lamont
- Helen Thurston – Stuntwoman for Karen
- Richard Farnsworth – Stuntman for Lamont

== Notes ==
The early scenes in this episode featuring the stranded couple menaced by sinister tumbleweeds bear a strong resemblance to Algernon Blackwood's well-known horror short story "The Willows".

The closing narration could be interpretated as a reflection about the limitations of our intellect as human beings, as well as a nod to cultural relativism, with the central idea of an extraterrestrial mind being potentially so different from ours that interaction and mutual understanding would be difficult, if not outright impossible.
