= Leave It to Larry =

American sitcom

Leave It to Larry is an American television situation comedy that was broadcast on CBS from October 14, 1952, until December 23, 1952, for a total of 11 episodes.

== Premise ==
Larry Tucker (portrayed by Eddie Albert in his first TV series) was a married man who, with his wife and two children, lived in a two-family house with his father-in-law, Mr. Koppel (portrayed by Ed Begley). Tucker also was "a bumbling shoe salesman" in Koppel's shoe store. That combination often put Tucker in the middle of conflicts.

== Cast ==
At the time of its premiere (classified by one source as a pilot), the show was titled Leave It to Lester, but "almost immediately" the title was changed to Leave It to Larry. Other changes occurred in the cast, with only Albert and Begley continuing. The title character's name went from Lester Tucker to Larry Tucker. Betty Kean played Tucker's wife, Amy, replacing Katherine Bard. Lydia Schaeffer portrayed the Tuckers' daughter (whose name was changed from Helen to Harriet), replacing Patsy Bruder. Glenn Walken had the role of the son, Steve, replacing Bradley Huston.

== Production and rating ==
Leo Solomon was the producer of, and a writer for, Leave It to Larry, with Mervyn Nelson as the director. Other writers were Vinnie Bogert and Billie Friedberg. The program originated at WCBS-TV.

Leave It to Larry was broadcast on Tuesday nights from 8 to 8:30 Eastern Time. Its competition was Milton Berle's Texaco Star Theater on NBC and (beginning the week of November 22) Bishop Fulton Sheen's Life Is Worth Living on DuMont. Sheen's Trendex rating for that week was 14.6 while Berle's program dropped to 35.2 and Albert's dropped to 7.6. When Leave It to Larry was cancelled, it was replaced on CBS by the second half of Ernie Kovacs' new hour-long evening program.
