= 2x45 =

Studio album by Cabaret Voltaire
- Released: May 1982
- Recorded: Western Works, Sheffield, October 1981; Pluto Studios, Manchester, February 1982
- Genres: Post-punk, avant-funk, industrial
- Length: 44:46
- Label: Rough Trade
- Producers: Cabaret Voltaire, Phil Bush

Cabaret Voltaire chronology
| Red Mecca (1981) | 2x45 (1982) | Hai! (Live in Japan) (1982) |

2x45 is the fifth studio album by the English band Cabaret Voltaire. It was released in May 1982 through Rough Trade. This was the last studio album by the band to feature founding member Chris Watson, who had departed during its recording.

== Background ==
The title comes from the album's original format of two 45 RPM 12" discs.

Sides A and B were recorded at Western Works, Sheffield in October 1981, while Sides C and D were recorded at Pluto Studios, Manchester in February 1982, after Watson's departure to join ITV Tyne Tees.

The track "Yashar" was later remixed as a dance record by John Robie and released as a single.

== Critical reception ==
Professional ratings
Review scores
| Source | Rating |
|---|---|
| AllMusic | 4.5/5 stars |
| The Encyclopedia of Popular Music | 3/5 stars |
| Muzik | 4/5 stars |
| The Rolling Stone Album Guide | 4/5 stars |
| Sounds | 1.5/5 stars |
| Spin Alternative Record Guide | 9/10 |
| Stylus Magazine | favourable |
| Uncut | 3/5 stars |

Trouser Press found 2x45 to be a "temporary letdown" following their previous release, Red Mecca, but went on to say: "Much has been said and written about an industrial, modern-age music; Cabaret Voltaire is the only group doing it... They make perhaps the most important pop music of our time."

== Track listing ==
Side A
| No. | Title | Writer(s) | Length |
|---|---|---|---|
| 1. | "Breathe Deep" | Richard H. Kirk, Stephen Mallinder, Chris Watson | 5:20 |
| 2. | "Yashar" | Kirk, Mallinder, Watson | 5:10 |

Side B
| No. | Title | Writer(s) | Length |
|---|---|---|---|
| 1. | "Protection" | Kirk, Mallinder, Watson | 7:42 |

Side C
| No. | Title | Writer(s) | Length |
|---|---|---|---|
| 1. | "War of Nerves (T.E.S.)" | Kirk, Mallinder | 5:11 |
| 2. | "Wait and Shuffle" | Kirk, Mallinder | 8:10 |

Side D
| No. | Title | Writer(s) | Length |
|---|---|---|---|
| 1. | "Get Out of My Face" | Kirk, Mallinder | 13:13 |

== Personnel ==
Cabaret Voltaire

- Stephen Mallinder – bass guitar, vocals, percussion on "Breathe Deep", "Yashar" and "Protection", tape on "War of Nerves (T.E.S.)", "Wait & Shuffle" and "Get Out of My Face", production
- Richard H. Kirk – guitar, saxophone, synthesizer, clarinet on "Breathe Deep", "Yashar" and "Protection", tape on "War of Nerves (T.E.S.)", "Wait & Shuffle" and "Get Out of My Face", production
- Chris Watson – organ and tape on "Breathe Deep", "Yashar" and "Protection", production

Additional personnel

- Alan Fish – drums and percussion on "Breathe Deep", "Yashar" and "Protection"
- Nort – drums and percussion on "War of Nerves (T.E.S.)", "Wait & Shuffle" and "Get Out of My Face"
- Eric Random – guitar and percussion on "War of Nerves (T.E.S.)", "Wait & Shuffle" and "Get Out of My Face"
- Neville Brody – sleeve inside artwork
- George Peckham – cutting
- Phil Bush – production and engineering on "War of Nerves (T.E.S.)", "Wait & Shuffle" and "Get Out of My Face"
