= The Invisible Enemy (The Outer Limits) =

- The Outer Limits episode
- Episode no.: Season 2 Episode 7
- Directed by: Byron Haskin
- Written by: Jerry Sohl
- Cinematography by: Kenneth Peach
- Production code: 35
- Original air date: October 31, 1964

Guest appearances
- Adam West; Rudy Solari; Chris Alcaide

Episode chronology
← Previous "Cry of Silence"	Next → "Wolf 359"

"The Invisible Enemy" is an episode of the original The Outer Limits television show. It first aired on October 31, 1964, during the series' second season.

== Opening narration ==
In the vast immensities of cosmic space, bold adventurers streak their way to join battle with strange enemies on strange worlds — the alien, the unknown, perhaps even the invisible, armed only with Man's earthbound knowledge...

== Plot ==
Two astronauts on the M-1 spaceship land on Mars in the year 2021; when one goes out to explore he is heard screaming and his last transmission indicates that he had no idea what was happening to him. When the second astronaut goes out to investigate, he too makes a similar transmission. Three years later a second mission, M-2, lands with a crew of four consisting of Major Merritt, Captains Buckley and Lazzari and Lieutenant Johnson. They are tasked both to explore and to determine what happened to the M-1. When Captain Lazzari is sent to explore the ruins of the M-1, he goes behind the ship to examine it and screams in unbearable agony, just like the previous crew. Captain Buckley and Lieutenant Johnson go to investigate and Buckley finds only bloodstains. Johnson, armed with a nuclear bazooka, wanders off and disappears. The two remaining crew are ordered to stay within the confines of the ship in the last hours before take-off. However, Captain Buckley has a vision wherein the planet's deserts appear as sand-filled oceans; he then slips out to examine these "oceans". While exiting the ship he cuts his hand; he rubs the blood onto a scrap of cloth and throws it out into the desert. He learns that a Sand-Beast – a crustacean-like animal that swims through the sands like a shark – is at fault for the deaths. Major Merritt, the leader of the expedition, was asleep when Captain Buckley exited, but goes out to find him and becomes trapped on a rock when the Sand-Beast pursues him. With ten minutes left until lift-off, Captain Buckley creates a distraction by running across the sands; this allows both Merritt and Buckley to reach the shore unharmed. They shoot the Sand-Beast, using the nuclear bazooka Johnson left behind when he was killed. The fatally wounded Sand-Beast submerges beneath the surface, but five other Sand-Beasts, drawn by the noise and blood of their dying kin, soon emerge. The two remaining astronauts realize, "There's a whole army of them". Major Merritt and Captain Buckley communicate with control on Earth that they are coming home.

== Closing narration ==
"'Battle joined. Casualties? Yes. Resolution: Victory, of a sort. A painful step from the crib of destiny. On another day, a friend, perhaps, instead of a deadly peril — part of the saga of the space pioneers."

== Background ==
The episode was based on a short story by Jerry Sohl, 'The Invisible Enemy', which was first published in Imaginative Tales magazine in September 1955. That story takes place on the fourth planet of a faraway star, where the fifty-man warship Nesbitt lands to investigate the disappearance of a number of spaceships sent to the planet. After a ten-man expeditionary team is consumed from inside a forcefield, the ship's computer suggests, unconvincingly, that "invisible" birds are to blame. Twenty-nine more men are killed and a lone survivor, named Lazzari, is found in the desert. The final transmission from his unit: "No! No! They're coming out of the ground!" Lazzari kills himself by smashing his head against a bulkhead and the remaining crew gather outside the ship to give him a military burial. The computer advises against it; the corpse is bloody and blood seems to provoke the attacks. Allison, the civilian computer expert, protests against the burial and is locked inside the Nesbitt by the mission commander. Allison watches helplessly as the funeral party is eaten by "large, heavy, porpoiselike creatures ...swimming up out of the sand as if it were water."

After reading Sohl's first draft based on his short story, ABC decided the monster should appear sooner, so Seeleg Lester rewrote the script. That version involved the ship's crew monitoring the planet's surface with cameras (Lester even talked to Sohl about writing scenes incorporating cameras beneath the sands of Mars), yet with all these cameras operating, the crew still didn't figure out what was killing them. After further rewrites by Sohl, the script was passed to producer Ben Brady, who rewrote the last act into a "calm fourth quarter". Finally, director Byron Haskin rewrote the entire script over a 28-hour period, feeling that the episode would never have aired if he had filmed the script he was given.

== Cast ==
- Adam West – Major Charles 'Chuck' Merritt
- Rudy Solari – Captain Buckley
- Joe Maross – General Winston
- Ted Knight – Asst. Secretary of State Mr. Jerome
- Chris Alcaide – Colonel Danvers
- Anthony Costello – Lieutenant Bowman
- Bob DoQui – Lieutenant Johnson
- Peter Marko – Captain Lazzari
- Mike Mikler – Captain Thomas

== Trivia ==
- This episode's alternative title is "The Yellow Sands".
- The Sand-Beast makes a cameo appearance in the next episode, "Wolf 359".
- This episode is erroneously listed on one DVD case ("The Outer Limits Volume Three The Original Series Disc 1 Episodes 33–40") in "The Outer Limits The Complete Original Series Volumes 1–3". The episode is actually only on Disc 2 included in the case for "The Outer Limits Volume Three The Original Series Discs 2–3 Episodes 39–49". The same is true for the next episode, "Wolf 359".
