= John W. Doorly =

British academic (1878–1950)

Personal details
- Born: 1878 Barbados, British West Indies
- Died: 1950 (aged 71–72)
- Denomination: Christian Science

John Williams Doorly (1878-1950) was a British Christian Science teacher, lecturer, and practitioner. He was known for his efforts to articulate and systematize what he saw as the fundamental principles of the "Science of Being" as found in the Bible and Science and Health with Key to the Scriptures by Mary Baker Eddy. Doorly was regarded by his followers as a pioneer within the Christian Science movement and spent more than four decades teaching and practicing his method of spirituality.

== Early life ==
John W. Doorly was born May of 1878 in Barbados, then part of the British West Indies. Doorly was sixth in a family of nine boys and one daughter. John’s father, Martin Edward Doorly, was a musician and his mother, Catherine Isabella‘s (nee Carrington) brother was Sir John Carrington, Chief Justice of Hong Kong. Although English by nationality, Doorly spent his early years in Barbados before emigrating to the United States as a young man. His first work pursuits included surveyor and silk manufacturing.

== Career ==
After arriving in the United States, Doorly became deeply interested in the teachings of Christian Science after attending a Christian Science church in 1902 with his wife, Bertie (nee Robinson) who was later known as Laura. He joined the Christian Science church and soon became a Christian Science practitioner in 1907. In 1910, he took a Normal class with Christian Science teacher Bicknell Young and became an authorized teacher himself.

Doorly taught and practiced Christian Science for more than 47 years. He became especially known for his efforts to explain the underlying structure and principles of Christian Science as a complete system. He served as President of The Mother Church, The First Church of Christ, Scientist, in Boston from 1919 to 1920 and was a member of the Christian Science Board of Lectureship from 1914 to 1929.

In May of 1942, The Board of Directors of The Mother Church wrote Doorly informing him of a long history of complaints regarding alleged improprieties by him, including causing division among Christian Scientists in the area, several infractions of bylaws from the Manual of The Mother Church, and teaching contrary to Eddy's Christian Science. Doorly was a member of Ninth Church of Christ, Scientist, London, a local branch of the Mother Church, and soon afterwards the board of Ninth Church accused Doorly of violating multiple provisions of the Manual, and eventually suspended his membership. Around the same time, another Christian Science teacher in London published an article in the November 6, 1943 edition of the Christian Science Sentinel, which while it didn't mention him by name, seemed to denounce Doorly's version of Christian Science. Doorly resigned Ninth Church in protest, and many of his students resigned with him. The Board of Directors of The Mother Church reviewed evidence against him, including the accusations of Ninth Church, and finally accused him of having "so far strayed as not to be fit for the work of a teacher of Christian Science" among other charges, and asked him to come to Boston to defend himself. Doorly did not go to Boston, and on August 4, 1944, after additional accusations, Doorly was barred from teaching for three years. In January 1945, Doorly published A Statement, in which he publicly defended himself and attacked the Board of Directors. The Board then accused him of working to injure the church, and said that he had defied their order by continuing to teach "under the guise of giving talks on the Bible", and after some back and forth, and another offer to come defend himself in Boston, Doorly's name was removed from the The Christian Science Journal as a practitioner, and he was excommunicated on August 29, 1946. Doorly sent a final letter to the Board saying that excommunication was a great honor and he was happy to be among those "who have been willing to be ostracized and driven out of religious organization rather than submit to the control and restraint of their spiritual vision."

Doorly did not start his own rival movement however, having come to believe that church organization was a restriction to spiritual growth. Still, his writings have gone on to influence numerous individuals and groups of ex-Christian Science and metaphysical writers. In particular, his student Max Kappeler became such a strong advocate of Doorly's teachings that it sometimes became known as the "Doorly-Kappeler" teaching. Kappeler focused his efforts on converting Christian Scientists rather than the public, and argued that the founder of Christian Science, Mary Baker Eddy, did not understand it, but that Doorly had offered the full explanation. The Christian Science Board of Directors published an editorial in the Journal of July 1975 rebuking Kappeler's ideas, although not by name. Christian Science historian Robert Peel wrote that authors such as Doorly and Kappeler had a "tendency to elaborate [Eddy's] teachings into an ingenious latter-day scholasticism, increasingly abstract as it soared into the realm of pure but undemonstrated theory.” According to him, it became "an esoteric intellectual game or exercise increasingly unrelated to Mrs. Eddy's demand for practical Christian demonstration."

Doorly delivered extensive lectures and summer schools in London and Oxford between the 1930s and 1950. Many of these talks were later published in transcript form.

== Publications and teachings ==
Doorly published his first book, The Pure Science of Christian Science in 1946.

He authored and published a number of books and lecture series concerning Christian Science, biblical interpretation, and metaphysics. His works included discussions on the Science of the Bible and the spiritual interpretation of biblical narratives. His teaching was centered around a numerological study Eddy's seven synonyms for God in a specific order, in which he believed all of human history revolved around.

In 1946, he founded The Foundational Book Company in London to publish his writings and related works on Christian Science.

Doorly’s teachings later became associated with the "Science of Being", a framework further developed by his student Max Kappeler. Organizations such as the Kappeler Institute and the John W. Doorly Trust continue to preserve and publish his writings.

The John W. Doorly Trust, established in the United Kingdom in 1991, was created to preserve and distribute his publications and archival materials.

=== Bibliography ===
Selected works include:

- Christian Science, 1913
- Christian Science: The Revelation of Christ. Boston: Christian Science Publishing Society. 1917.
- Talks on the science of the Bible. Foundational Book Company. 1940. OCLC 0806840 – via Open Library.
- A Statement, 1943
- The Pure Science of the Bible. 1947 – via Open Library.
- The Science of the Bible, 1949
- Talks Given by John W. Doorly on Christian Science Practice. Foundational Book Company. 1958.
- God and Science. 1949 – via Open Library.
- Kings I and II (Talks on Science of Bible). 1949.
- Talks given by John W. Doorly on the science of the Bible. 1957 – via Open Library.
