= Marietta T. Webb =

American Christian Scientist (1864–1951)

Marietta Thomas Webb
- Born: Marietta Thomas Jones; 1864; Petersburg, Virginia, United States of America
- Died: 1951 (aged 86–87)
- Occupation: Christian Science practitioner
- Years active: 1911-1951
- Known for: Early practitioner whose testimony appears in Science and Health with Key to the Scriptures by Mary Baker Eddy
- Spouse: Hiram Webb
- Children: H. Orlando Webb

Marietta Thomas Webb (1864–1951) was one of the first African American Christian Science practitioners, and her testimony was selected to appear in Mary Baker Eddy's book Science and Health with Key to the Scriptures.

== Biography ==
Webb was born in Petersburg, Virginia in 1864 to Randall and Georgiana Jones, a little over a year after Abraham Lincoln signed the Emancipation Proclamation. She was one of five children, made up of three sons and two daughters. In 1869 the family relocated to Boston, where Webb received a substantial secondary education. In 1892 she married an engineer named Hiram Webb. They had one child together, Hiram Orlando, who they called "Orlando."

By age four, Orlando suffered from a host of physical maladies, the most serious of which was rickets, a disease that softens and weakens bones in children. Constantly hovering between life and death, physicians pronounced him incurable, and said that if he survived he would be an invalid. In early 1897, Webb was invited by a friend to a Wednesday evening testimony meeting at a nearby church called The First Church of Christ, Scientist, also known as "The Mother Church". As Webb wrote nine years later in the Christian Science Journal, after attending the meeting she felt that she had found "the religion for which I had been searching for years."

Webb sought healing help from a Christian Science practitioner, and borrowed a copy of Science and Health from her friend. As she began reading, she noticed Orlando getting better, and within a week he was able to get up and play. As she read on, she said his limbs grew straighter and stronger until in less than a month he had fully recovered. Orlando would end up living a natural, healthy life until 1979, when he died at age 87. After her son's recovery Webb said she found Christian Science to be "the only salvation of my race." In 1907 Mary Baker Eddy put Webb's testimony of Orlando's healing in the final chapter of her book, where it remains today.

Webb joined the Church of Christ, Scientist in 1899. That same year she wrote her first article in The Christian Science Sentinel, called "The Protecting Power of Truth", about her allegiance to the "Science of Christianity", and about the "prejudice which exists throughout the United States." She later wrote that she found Christian Science the basis for "getting out of the old prejudiced self and into the spiritual sense of man’s union with God," and saying that according to Mary Baker Eddy and Science and Health, she was a "child of God, not a colored child of God."

In 1900, Webb relocated her family to Los Angeles, California. In 1911, at the age of 47, she became one of the first African Americans to be a journal-listed Christian Science practitioner.

== Influence ==
In 1934, Webb became a founding member of a Christian Science congregation in East Los Angeles made up of almost entirely Black Americans. The press called her a "world known church worker," and in 1950, a year before her death, she was the subject of an article in Ebony Magazine featuring Black American Christian Scientists whose numbers had "burgeoned." The photograph the magazine used for the feature shows Webb reading the Bible without glasses, confirming a healing of vision troubles she had written about in her 1906 Journal testimony.

Webb's ardent participation in the Christian Science movement influenced a host of Black American adherents in the Jazz music world in the early to mid-20th century, most notably actor and singer Pearl Bailey, percussionist Lionel Hampton, violinist and conductor Everett Lee, musician Cornelius Bumpus, and singer and composer Blanche Calloway. Academy award-nominated actor Alfre Woodard has been public about her practice of the religion for years.
