= Bliss Knapp =

American Christian Science teacher (1877–1958)

- Knapp in an undated photo from the early 20th century
- Born: June 7, 1877; Lyman, New Hampshire
- Died: March 14, 1958 (aged 80)

Bliss Knapp (June 7, 1877 – March 14, 1958), the son of Ira O. and Flavia S. Knapp, students of Mary Baker Eddy, was an early Christian Science lecturer, practitioner, teacher and the author of The Destiny of the Mother Church.

== Childhood ==
Bliss Knapp, C.S.B., was born on June 7, 1877, in Lyman, New Hampshire. His parents, Ira Oscar Knapp and Flavia Stickney Knapp, were students of Mary Baker Eddy, the founder of Christian Science, and they were pioneering workers in its growth. Ira Knapp was one of the original directors to whom Mrs. Eddy deeded the land on which the Original Edifice of the Mother Church, The First Church of Christ, Scientist, in Boston, Massachusetts, was built.

Bliss Knapp's mother Flavia had studied under Eddy at the Massachusetts Metaphysical College in Boston, having completed her Primary in April 1889. In the summer of 1895 she taught a Primary class with Bliss as a member. He finished this class before the beginning of the fall session at the university. Bliss's sister Daphne was in Mrs. Eddy's last class of 1898, the so-called "Class of Seventy" as seventy invitations had been sent out although 67 attended. Mrs. Knapp was selected as the first teacher in the new Board of Education. Mrs. Knapp taught 85 primary class pupils as a teacher of Christian Science. She was selected to teach the 1898 Normal class but died on March 15, 1898.

== Academic and religious education ==
Mrs. Eddy had requested that Bliss receive the finest education available in his day. Bliss initially entered Harvard part-time while studying Latin and Mathematics to bring them up to college level. He entered Harvard full-time in 1898. Despite evidence to the contrary, Mrs. Eddy saw much spiritual promise in the shy young man who couldn't find the courage to so much as get up and give a testimony at the Wednesday evening meetings until after he had been appointed to the Christian Science Board of Lectureship.

== Early church work ==
While at Harvard, Knapp helped organize informal services among Christian Scientists. Initially held as receptions at the home of William P. McKenzie, prominent lecturers on Christian Science such as Edward A. Kimball of Chicago, Illinois, and Irving Tomlinson of Concord, New Hampshire, addressed these gatherings. Later after his graduation, Bliss and his cousin Edwin Johnson were instrumental in encouraging Mrs. Eddy to establish a church-sanctioned way to hold services at colleges and universities. Mrs. Eddy's response dated February 12, 1904, was a letter including her proposed changes to the By-laws of her Church known as the Manual of The Mother Church, which, with a few changes, would allow for the establishing what today are known as Christian Science College Organizations (in Article XXII Section 8). Harvard University thus became home to the first such Christian Science college organization and held the first lecture sponsored by such an organization, which was delivered by Judge Septimus J. Hanna in December 1905.

In his last year at Harvard, in March 1901, Bliss was notified by William B. Johnson, Clerk of the Mother Church that, "by recommendation of our Beloved Teacher, the Reverend Mary Baker Eddy, and the unanimous vote of the CS Board of Directors, you have been made a First Member of The First Church of Christ, Scientist."

Immediately upon graduation in June 1901, Bliss Knapp entered the public practice of Christian Science healing with the encouragement of Eddy. In 1902, he was appointed Assistant Superintendent of the Children's Sunday School of the Mother Church.

== Attends the Massachusetts Metaphysical College ==
In November 1903 Bliss was selected to attend the primary class of the Massachusetts Metaphysical College, now under the Board of Education, and he was taught with Judge W.G. Ewing, Mrs. And Mrs. Archibald McClellan, Judge and Mrs. Clifford P. Smith and Mr. and Mrs. Ella S. Rathvon by a well-known student of Mrs. Eddy, Edward A. Kimball, C.S.D.

== Career as a Christian Science lecturer ==
On Mrs. Eddy's encouragement, in 1904 Bliss Knapp began his career as a Christian Science lecturer which would last, off and on, until 1931. Mrs. Eddy had approved his appointment even while her own students such as Calvin Frye said that he was hopelessly shy. Many years later Bliss would recall this appointment, explaining that, "Mrs. Eddy knew that I had an extreme case of bashfulness when she decided to appoint me to the Board of Lectureship. Calvin Frye told me later he warned Mrs. Eddy she was making a mistake in placing one who was so fearful and timid on the Board, but she waived his objections aside. When I got her letter telling me what she proposed to do, I could have said with (the Hebrew prophet) Job, 'The thing I greatly feared hath come upon me.' Then I aroused myself from that and realized that Mrs. Eddy would never think of appointing me to the Board of Lectureship unless she believed that I could do it. Then what would hinder me but a belief of self and a wilful determination to be afraid, both of which are unlovely and unworthy of a hearing. So I went forward until I achieved enough to win Mrs. Eddy's unqualified approval of my work."

Bliss Knapp's first lecture was given in White Mountains, New Hampshire, and was introduced by one of Mrs. Eddy's students, Miss Emma C. Shipman.

== Knapp's Association of Students ==
Bliss Knapp's students continued to meet annually and to hear a morning address that was usually written by one of his students. Bliss Knapp's Students' Association voted to disband in 2007.

== Knapp biography written by his student ==
In the late 1990s, Knapp student and former Principia College professor, Charles Theodore "Ted" Houpt published a biography on Knapp called, "Bliss Knapp - Christian Scientist." The author made extensive use of Knapp letters to his family and students.

== Eddy actively supports Knapp's lecture work ==
Upon receiving his first lecture, Mrs. Eddy wrote to Bliss Knapp in August 1904 that she was pleased with it and that the excerpts she has read were "clear, logical and high-toned." She sent him a book called The Essentials of Elocution by Alfred Ayres, Funk and Wagnalls, New York, 1897.

Mrs. Eddy helped edit his lecture "Christian Science: Its Nature and Purpose" in her own handwriting, making eleven changes in the body of the lecture and all but one in the section "Christian Science no Will Power". They were changes in diction, not content. Clearly Mrs. Eddy approved of his lecture and its metaphysics as Christian Science, "pure religion and undefiled." Mrs. Eddy was so pleased with the final lecture, she asked that it be printed in pamphlet form in 1906 for distribution, and translated into French in 1908 and (in Mrs. Eddy's own words) "given to the world."

== Destiny of the Mother Church controversy ==
In the early 1920s, Bliss Knapp authored a biography of his parents, Ira and Flavia Stickney Knapp. In 1948 he wrote a book called "The Destiny of the Mother Church," incorporating the biographical information on his parents from the earlier work as well as some of his beliefs about Mrs. Eddy. These beliefs were at the heart of a controversy that continues to this day. Knapp held that Eddy represented a personal fulfilment of biblical prophecy as the woman referred to in the twelfth chapter of the Book of Revelation. While Knapp's father, Ira Knapp, had subscribed to that belief himself, and had been selected by Eddy to be the first person to serve as chairman of the Christian Science Board of Directors, during a libel suit by Josephine Custis Woodbury in 1892, Ira was forced, under oath in court, to concede Eddy had never taught this interpretation herself. While this concession in court was made by Knapp, others felt that Knapp meant that Mrs. Eddy, as a mortal, could not be that Woman, but as an idea of God, she, in fact could be related to that woman. It was felt by supporters of Mrs. Eddy as "the Woman," that any attempt to paint Mrs. Eddy in this light would meet with universal condemnation of her and her church for deifying her and so, this line of thought went, this notion should never be put forth as any official view of the Church but might be privately taught. But even at that time, students of Mrs. Eddy such as the highly successful lecturer, Edward Kimball, CSD, were of the opinion that Mrs. Eddy discovered Christian Science because she simply climbed the mountain of spiritual inspiration until, like someone ascending a mountain during the night, she was the first to glimpse the sun from that elevated point.

Eddy herself did not hesitate to identify with the impersonal spiritual type the woman represented and apparently tolerated ambiguities on the subject. Her relationship to Biblical prophecy is not an essential theological point in Christian Science and is not included in its tenets. However, opponents of Knapp's view argued Eddy disavowed individual, personal interpretations specifically. She had written in her final edition of Science and Health, "The woman in the Apocalypse symbolizes generic man [her term for all mankind, understood spiritually], the spiritual idea of God; she illustrates the coincidence of God and man as the divine Principle and divine idea" (p. 561). In comments elsewhere she expanded the distinction, writing, "What St. John saw in prophetic vision and depicted as 'a woman clothed with the sun and the moon under her feet' prefigured no speciality or individuality. His vision foretold a type, and this type applied to man as well as to woman...."

Knapp incorporated his teachings into an early book draft, The Destiny of The Mother Church, following which the Christian Science Board of Directors wrote a six-page letter in February 1948 politely rebuking numerous points they regarded as at variance from Eddy's teaching. Knapp then withdrew the book, but instead of revising it as they proposed, he disregarded their comments and expanded it for private issue instead, leaving it in trust with approximately $100 million in 1990s dollars, acquired by way of his marriage to Eloise Mabury (m. March 27, 1918), to revert to the Church of Christ, Scientist if it ever published his work as "authorized literature".

The board of directors voted in 1990 to print The Destiny of The Mother Church, to the surprise of many of its members, arguing that the book did not have to bear the burden of theological correctness. Other members however argued that this was in violation of the Church Manual bylaw "No Incorrect Literature". The church proceeded to issue the book unannotated as required, as part of a series of biographies of the church's founder. In 1991, Archivist Lee Johnson retired. An unknown number of Christian Science branch churches voted not to carry the book or simply declined to order it, though precise figures are difficult to establish. The financial disbursement was contested by the alternate beneficiaries, Stanford University and the Los Angeles County Museum of Art, ultimately resulting in a settlement splitting the funds, with half going to the Church and a quarter each going to the other two organizations – itself a violation of Knapp's own will's provisions.

The book's publication attracted a fair deal of unwelcome media attention and continued to be held by some members, in spite of the Church's defense, to violate the church's basic teachings and its equivalent of constitutional law.

A vocal group of critics of Christian Science church managerial policy including Lee Johnson, and Stephen Gottschalk, a protégé of historian and author, Robert Peel, came together after the publication of the Knapp book to petition the Church management to withdraw the book from publication and to inform the Church membership of their belief that this book contradicted Eddy's teachings, thereby violating her Church Manual.

The book was withdrawn from publication in September 2023.

== Notable students ==
- Erwin Canham
- Roscoe Drummond
- Dr. Robert C. Putnam, CS, former Professor of Chemistry at Massachusetts Institute of Technology

== See also ==
- Septimus J. Hanna
- William R. Rathvon
