= Mary Burt Messer =

American educator and writer (1881–1960)

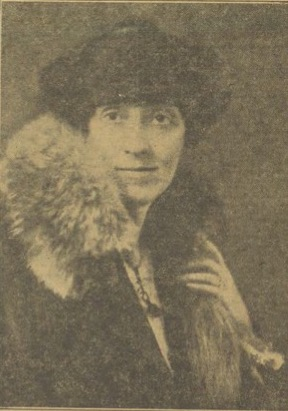
- Born: 1881; Washington, D.C., U.S.
- Died: 1960 (aged 78–79)
- Occupations: Educator; author; Christian Science practitioner
- Years active: 1901–1960
- Known for: Promoting idealism and equity for women in family relations

Mary Burt Messer (1881–1960) was an American activist, social worker, professor, author, and Christian Science practitioner. Messer was an advocate for women's rights and a leader of the Wisconsin chapter of the National Women's Party. As a scholar, she wrote The Family in the Making: A Historical Sketch (1928), a study of family structure from early history to the 20th century. Influenced by the writings of Mary Baker Eddy, Messer's life and work emphasized healing, spiritual idealism, and autonomy for women.

== Early life ==
Mary Burt Messer was born in Washington, D.C., in 1881. Her maternal grandfather was John Wesley North. Her mother, Emma North Bacon Messer, wrote a three-part memoir that spanned her childhood on the frontier to her memory of the Lincoln assassination. Mary Burt's father, Edmund Clarence Messer, was an artist and arts administrator in Washington, where Mary Burt spent her early years. Edmund founded the Washington Art Club and taught at the Art Student's League of Washington. From 1902 to 1918, he worked as the principal of Corcoran School of Art. Mary Burt had one sibling, a sister named Margaret, who died as a child. The family lived near Frederick Douglass, whom she recalled meeting and later cited as an inspiration for her activism as a suffragist. All three members of the family wrote poetry.

From 1901 to 1902, Messer attended Vassar College (as a "special student", not fully-enrolled) and then joined the settlement movement and began to advocate for voting rights for women. In New York, Messer worked as a social worker with organizations that included the Association for Improving the Condition of the Poor and the Charity Organization Society. During this time, she also served as an organizer for the National American Woman Suffrage Association, led by Carrie Chapman Catt, in New York.

== Career ==
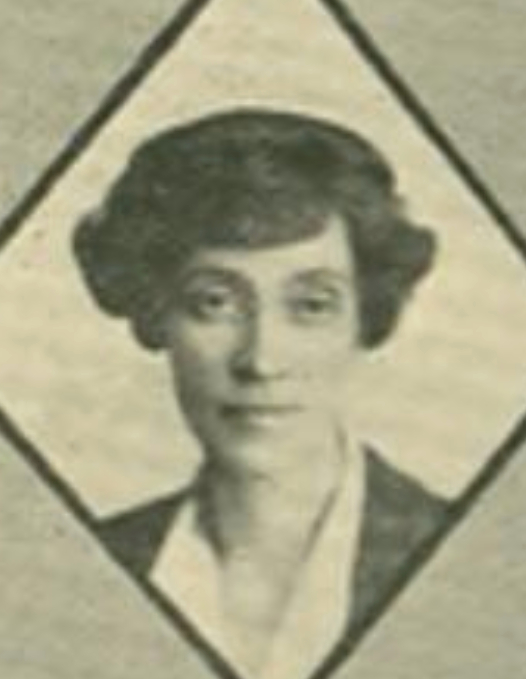
Mary Burt Messer's faculty photograph while at the Stout Institute, 1922

In 1916, Messer moved to Dunn County, Wisconsin, where she worked for seven years as an instructor of sociology at the Stout Institute (led by Lorenzo D. Harvey) in Menomonie. At the time, Stout's students were mainly women as a result of the men being enlisted in the military in World War I. Along with other women from Stout, Messer formed the Dunn County Suffrage Party on January 12, 1917. Soon thereafter, Messer became active in the National Woman's Party (NWP) and served as vice-chairman of the Wisconsin branch. Her activities in the NWP are reflected in newspaper stories from the Wisconsin press that acknowledge her role as an organizer. Among other events, Messer had a lead role in hosting suffragist speaker, Lillian Ascough and in organizing a series of events connected to a chartered train, known as the "Prison Special", through Wisconsin. The Prison Special featured speakers who had been jailed for their suffragist activism. After the Nineteenth Amendment was ratified, Messer became the chair of the Wisconsin Teachers' Council of the NWP and focused her work on labor issues and equal pay for women teachers. In 1921 Messer participated in an effort to draft an additional constitutional amendment, which, after three years of editing, became the Equal Rights Amendment. Messer hoped the amendment would strengthen women's citizenship by "straightening out the status of woman at every point."

While doing this work, Messer's parents (after her father retired from teaching in D.C.) moved to Wisconsin to join her. After her father's death, her mother continued to live with her even after she moved to California.

While beginning her career as an activist, Messer also joined the Church of Christ, Scientist. This decision in November 1916 reflected an interest in Christian Science by other suffragists who joined the church in the same time period, including Helen Paul (Alice Paul's sister) and Alma Lutz. In 1923 Messer and her mother moved to Berkeley, California, so that Mary Burt could take a position as an instructor at the University of California, Berkeley Extension. In that same year, she began studying the teachings of Mary Baker Eddy under the instruction of Frank Gale in San Francisco. According to The Christian Science Monitor in 1924, her course on family life attracted strong interest from students. The class was grounded in the idea that women, "liberated from social, civic and political inhibitions", could likewise advocate for changes in family life. Messer taught the class without a textbook, but from her notes and in discussions with students. While teaching this class, Messer began researching the causes of divorce. Her course at Berkeley and her focus on divorce drew the attention of The New York Times in 1924, which echoed Messer's thesis by noting that the loss of religious prohibitions against divorce should be met with an increased attention to idealism in relationships. Her work, however, also drew criticism. For example, a reviewer in a Jesuit publication, America: A Catholic Review of the Week, argued that the religious significance of marriage is its own version of idealism.

The themes of political activism, social work, and Christian Science idealism formed the foundation for her key work, the book, The Family in the Making: An Historic Sketch. The book, dedicated to Lorenzo D. Harvey, was published in 1928. It received attention from sociologists and others who provided reviews, including: Sophonisba Breckinridge, Manuel Conrad Elmer, and Ernest Groves. The final chapter of the book, "The Advance of Woman", favorably compared the Christian Science teachings of Mary Baker Eddy to the patriarchy Messer found in contemporary Christianity. Three years later, in 1931, Messer was listed as a Christian Science practitioner in The Christian Science Journal. The role of practitioner in Christian Science required a commitment to the care and support of Christian Science patients and clients. As a practitioner, Messer also wrote articles for The Christian Science Monitor. In 1943 she began writing a series of editorial articles on the concept of a "spiritual society" as an alternative to conflicts and wars. However, the Monitor, in an effort to maintain its mission as a secular newspaper, discontinued the series after its first installment. After 1943, all the work by Messer published in the Monitor were poems and not direct editorials about spirituality. The unpublished entries, however, may have served as the foundation for work that was later published by the Philosophical Library in New York City.

Although Messer's role as an author for the Monitor diminished in the 1940s, her work as an advocate for women continued to deepen. She was active in both the National Woman's Party and the World Woman's Party. In 1945 the National Woman's Party appointed her to the role of consultant at the San Francisco Conference. The following year, she represented the party by supporting a resolution for equal rights at the 1946 UN Assembly.

In the following decade, Messer published two books, East and West, as Face to Face and Side by Side: A Christian Scientist Replies to the Communist Manifesto (1950) and The Science of Society: The Identity of Each as Godlike Embracing All (1959). These works received negative reviews from scholars who objected to Messer's interest in Mary Baker Eddy's ideas and to Messer's thoughts on materialism. In the work, Messer critiques both capitalism and communism for their over-emphasis on materialism and their neglect of the spiritual.

Mary Burt Messer served as Christian Science practitioner from 1931 until her death in 1960. In the last years of her life, she lived in Cambridge, Massachusetts.

== Influence ==
Mary Burt Messer's work as an advocate for women's rights and as a scholar provided an early example of challenges faced by women who sought holistic understanding of a person's role in religion and society. As Messer noted in reflecting on her efforts as activist and an author, the Christian Science Church was "institutionally confined, in the main, to healing the body", and that, as a result, "one who takes out exactly the same process into healing the body politic is in for quite a few batterings". In this respect, Messer was a path breaker for change, as Robert Peel, in his book, Health and Medicine in the Christian Science Tradition (1988), observed:

Today we may be a little closer to the realization of Mary Burt Messer's 1928 conjecture that eventually Christian Science would be seen as "a contribution to the larger 'science' that must avail itself of every true perception and attribute of mind in its quest for knowledge".

== Selected works ==
- The Family in the Making: An Historic Sketch. New York: G.P. Putnam's & Sons, 1943. ISBN 9780598411716
- "'As Man Awakes,' The World We Have: A Study of Society Today by a Student of Christian Science." Christian Science Monitor. March 1, 1943: 18.
- East and West, as Face to Face and Side by Side: A Christian Scientist Replies to the Communist Manifesto. New York: Philosophical Library, 1950. ISBN 1258072114
- The Science of Society: The Identity of Each as Godlike Embracing All. New York: Philosophical Library, 1959. ISBN 9780802211071
