= Adam H. Dickey =

Christian Science practitioner and teacher

Adam Herbert Dickey
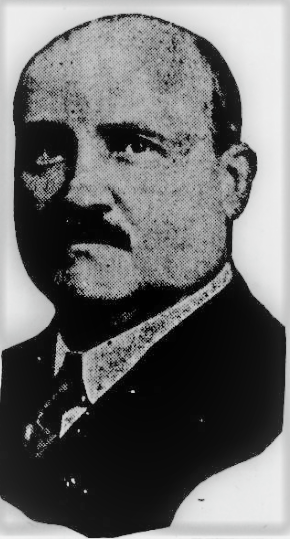
- Born: June 26, 1864; Toronto, Ontario, Canada
- Died: February 8, 1925 (aged 60); Brookline, Massachusetts
- Occupations: Author, secretary

Adam Herbert Dickey (June 26, 1864 – February 8, 1925) was an author, member of the Board of Directors of The First Church of Christ, Scientist, and a secretary to Mary Baker Eddy.

== Biography ==
Dickey was born in Toronto, Canada where he was raised a Methodist. His family moved to Kansas City, Missouri when he was a teen and he began working at his father's business, W.S. Dickey Clay Manufacturing, in 1884. In 1887 he married Lillian M. Selden, and in 1893 his wife became interested in Christian Science after what she saw as a healing through prayer. He joined her in studying the religion and joined The Mother Church soon after.

In 1898 he and his wife visited Mexico for business where they met a city official, who was reportedly suffering from jaundice. Dickey introduced him to Christian Science and prayed during the night and the man recovered. This inspired Dickey, upon returning to Kansas City, to immediately quit his job to become a Christian Science practitioner. Soon afterwards he would start teaching Christian Science and become First Reader at his church in Kansas City.

In 1908 he began working for Mary Baker Eddy as a secretary until she died in 1910. He was named by Eddy as a Trustee to her estate in 1909 and a director of the Mother Church on November 21, 1910. This was her last official communication to any of her Church officers. He remained in the position until 1925; and was also Treasurer of the Mother Church from 1912 to 1917.

Dickey's biography entitled Memoirs of Mary Baker Eddy was published posthumously with the permission of his widow Lillian S. Dickey in 1927; however it was not published as an official biography sanctioned by the Mother Church to be sold in Christian Science Reading Rooms at the time. In 2013, his book finally appeared in the anthology We Knew Mary Baker Eddy Volume II alongside other early Christian Scientists such as Septimus J. Hanna and William R. Rathvon. Dickey also wrote two of the most famous articles within the church in The Christian Science Journal entitled "God's Law of Adjustment" and "Possession".

== Publications ==
- God's Law of Adjustment (1916)
- Possession (1917)
- Memoirs of Mary Baker Eddy (1927) (Republished in We Knew Mary Baker Eddy Volume II (2013))
