= Christian Science Hymnal =

Christian hymnal

The Christian Science Hymnal is a collection of hymns used in Christian Science church services including Sunday services and Wednesday evening testimony meetings, as well as in occasional informal hymn sings.

== Content ==
The Christian Science Hymnal includes both traditional Christian hymns and hymns unique to the Christian Science hymnal. The hymnal includes tunes from a variety of styles and nationalities. It gives metronomic markings to help musicians, but never a fixed tempo, so that the musicians may find the appropriate speed for the building, congregation, or situation themselves.

The hymnal includes seven poems by the denomination's founder Mary Baker Eddy set to various tunes: Christ My Refuge, Christmas Morn, Communion Hymn, Feed My Sheep, Love, Mother's Evening Prayer, and Satisfied. The hymnal also includes hymns written by John Greenleaf Whittier, Isaac Watts, Samuel Longfellow, and many others. A 2017 supplement added modern hymn and tune authors, such as Dietrich Bonhoeffer.

== History ==
At the beginning of the Christian Science movement, congregants used other Christian hymnals, but in 1890 the Publishing Society printed a 17 hymn words-only booklet, which was followed two years later in 1892 by the first formal Christian Science Hymnal.

The hymnal contained 210 hymns, and generally presented two hymns on a single page, in their poetic form, in conjunction with two or three tunes to which either could be sung. Hymns 179–193 were presented individually, interlined with their respective tunes. Organist and music editor for the hymnal Lyman F. Brackett (1852-1937) contributed 99 of the book's tunes. The layout of the book is described in the Preface:

The system of arrangement is original and unique. On the pages with the hymns, have been placed standard tunes familiar to every church-goer. Every second tune is by an English or German composer of unquestioned musical ability, and will be found adapted either to chorus-choir, or advanced congregational singing. Every third tune has been composed by Mr. Brackett especially for this work;...

After 1892, the hymnal was revised in 1898, 1903, and 1910. The revised hymnals presented the hymns interlined with their tunes for easier reading, as is common practice in America today. Eddy was not closely involved in the 1910 revision of the hymnal, but had input on a few hymns, for instance approving a tune for her poem Mother's Evening Prayer.

=== 1932 edition ===
In 1928, the Christian Science Board of Directors appointed initial committees in London and Boston to create another revision, which was published in 1932. Violet S. Hay was involved in this process as the chairman of the London committee, and seven of her hymns appear in the final product.

The hymns in the 1932 edition were primarily alphabetical by first line, some with alternate tune settings, and include information on the author, tune composer, meter, and use by permission. There were 429 hymns/tunes: 297 hymns were presented with different tune settings (241 appeared in the 1910 edition). Alternate tunes setting the same hymn were presented in numerical succession in the main body of the book (a change from the 1910 edition). The final 29 entries were in the Supplement section which was present in the original printing of the 1932 book:

In a few cases the familiar arrangement of a tune has been placed in the Supplement, and a new arrangement in the body of the book.... The Supplement, which is serially numbered though not alphabetically arranged, includes also hymns and tunes which are more or less locally or nationally rather than internationally serviceable.

Settings of two of Eddy's poems, Love and Satisfied, first appeared with the 1932 edition. More numerous alternate settings of the seven hymns by Eddy were provided, as they are chosen often for use in worship services. Index listings include tunes alphabetically, tunes metrically, composers and sources, tempo indications, authors and sources, and first lines. Found in the Supplement section are the hymns, I Need Thee Every Hour, I'm a Pilgrim and I'm a Stranger, and Eternity, which were originally included in the hymnal at the request of Eddy.

The 1932 version became the standard through the present day, typically in first blue, then brown cover, with an octagonal emboss of the Original Mother Church tower and Extension dome. It has been translated into numerous languages; the tunes and hymn numbers are maintained, joined to the vernacular versions of the texts. Visitors would be able to sing in their own language, joining with the congregation singing in the other language.

=== New supplements and editions ===
During the early 1980s, exploratory work was undertaken into a third edition, with many new tunes and texts planned for inclusion, but the project was shelved in 1988. In late 2008, a new supplement containing 33 additional hymns/tunes was published in booklet form.

In 2017, The Church published Christian Science Hymnal: Hymns 430–603. This hymnal complements the 1932 edition, and includes contemporary and traditional hymns, and hymns from around the world. The 2017 edition consists of 174 hymns, including 30 from the 2008 Supplement and 17 new settings of poems by Mary Baker Eddy.

== See also ==
- List of English-language hymnals by denomination
