= Christian Science (book) =

1907 book by Mark Twain

- Author: Mark Twain
- Language: English
- Subject: Christian Science
- Genre: Essay collection
- Publisher: Harper & Brothers
- Publication date: 1907
- Publication place: United States

Christian Science is a 1907 book by the American writer Mark Twain (1835–1910). The book is a collection of essays Twain wrote about Christian Science, beginning with an article that was published in Cosmopolitan in 1899. Although Twain was interested in mental healing and the ideas behind Christian Science, he was hostile towards its founder, Mary Baker Eddy (1821–1910).

== Background ==
Twain's first article about Christian Science was published in Cosmopolitan in 1899. A humorous work of fiction, it describes how he fell over a cliff while walking in Austria, breaking several bones. A Christian Science practitioner who lived nearby was sent for, but could not attend immediately and so undertook to provide an "absent healing". She sent a message asking Twain to wait overnight and to remember that there was nothing wrong with him:

I thought there must be some mistake.

"Did you tell her I walked off a cliff seventy-five feet high?"

"Yes."

"And struck a boulder at the bottom and bounced?"

"Yes."

"And struck another one and bounced again?"

"Yes."

"And struck another one and bounced yet again?"

"Yes."

"And broke the boulders?"

"Yes."

"That accounts for it; she is thinking of the boulders. Why didn't you tell her I got hurt, too?"

In the third chapter of this story, as published in the book form described below, Twain estimates more than 120 fractures, some or many of which were visible to him, as well as 7 dislocated joints, including his hips, shoulders, knees and neck. All of these were healed within three hours of the "Christian Science doctor's" visit of the second day of the story. Immediately following this healing, he turns to the local country horse doctor to cure a headache and stomach ache.

In 1907 he collected this and several other critical articles he had written and published them as a book, Christian Science. Twain himself believed that mind could influence matter to some degree. He nevertheless took strong exception to the writings of Eddy, calling them "incomprehensible and uninterpretable". He was particularly incensed by the thought that Eddy was using Christian Science to accrue wealth and power for herself.

After publication of Twain's book, the editors of Cosmopolitan stated that although they had printed his original articles, his "serious and extended criticism may be said to represent the uninformed view of Christian Science", and that they were "anxious... to give both sides of the controversy" and so allowed Edward A. Kimball, a prominent Christian Scientist, an opportunity for a rebuttal, which was printed in 1907.

== Critical responses ==
Both James Gray Horn, a biographer of Mark Twain, and Gillian Gill, a biographer of Mary Baker Eddy, have characterized Twain as "ambivalent" towards Christian Science itself. His view of Eddy however was much more consistently negative. In his writing, Twain called Eddy "[g]rasping, sordid, penurious, famishing for everything she sees—money, power, glory—vain, untruthful, jealous, despotic, arrogant, insolent, pitiless where thinkers and hypnotists are concerned, illiterate, shallow, incapable of reasoning outside of commercial lines, immeasurably selfish."

Historian L. Ashley Squires wrote that "Mark Twain's critique is still the best known and most frequently studied, but it is not particularly well understood. When not treated as straightforward misogyny, Twain's antagonism toward Eddy is almost invariably presented in stark Manichean terms: modern scientific rationalism versus religious mysticism." She wrote:

While some readers have taken Twain's hostility toward Mary Baker Eddy as sort of the default rational response to something like Christian Science, confusion frequently arises from what appear to be contradictions in Twain's stated positions. On the one hand, Twain accepted many of Christian Science's healing claims and frequently expressed admiration for Eddy, but on the other hand, he was prone to making pronouncements about the threat that the movement and its leader posed to American democracy. This tension between Christian Science as a potentially effective healing system (though not for all ailments) and Christian Science as apocalyptic threat is challenging to reconcile. Echoing a rather common sentiment among Twain scholars, Laura E. Skandera-Trombley calls Christian Science "almost unreadable."

== See also ==
- The Life of Mary Baker G. Eddy and the History of Christian Science (1909)
