= Septimus J. Hanna =

American judge and Christian Science teacher (1845–1921)

Judge Septimus J. Hanna
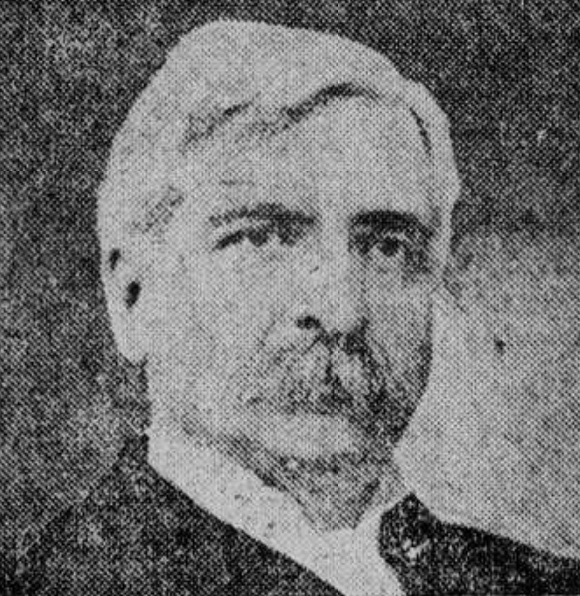
- Judge Septimus J. Hanna
- Born: July 29, 1845; Spring Mills, Pennsylvania, US
- Died: July 23, 1921 (aged 75); Pasadena, California, US
- Occupations: Lawyer and judge; Christian Science teacher and lecturer
- Years active: 1872–1890; 1890–1921
- Spouse: Camilla Hanna (née Turley)

Septimus James Hanna (July 29, 1845 – July 23, 1921), an American Civil War veteran and a judge in the Old West. He was a student of Mary Baker Eddy, who founded the Christian Science church. Giving up his legal career, he became a Christian Science practitioner, lecturer and teacher. Hanna occupied more leading positions within the church organization than any individual, serving as pastor, then First Reader of The Mother Church, as editor and associate editor of the periodicals, member of the Bible Lesson Committee, he served two terms as president of The Mother Church, he was teacher of the Normal (teachers) Class of 1907, later vice president and then president of the Massachusetts Metaphysical College.

== Family background ==
Hanna's grandfather, Andrew Hanna, a Presbyterian from Scotland, emigrated to the United States after the American Revolutionary War and bought land in Penns Valley in Pennsylvania. He served in the War of 1812 and was in a battle that was part of the Battle of Lake Erie. He married a daughter of James Cook, a Federalist once described as "a tall, dignified gentleman ... a man of large means." Hanna's father, Samuel Cook Hanna, a farmer, was born in 1808 in Centre County, Pennsylvania, and spent his boyhood there. His father was an active member of the Methodist church and served as superintendent of the Sunday school. A history of the Spring Mills Sunday School noted about him, "His words were few and always spoken with gentleness, but his life had a power whose influence was deep and abiding."

His mother, Susanna Miles, was descended from a Baptist family who came from Radnor, Wales, with William Penn in "Ye Good Shippe Welcome" to become among the earliest settlers of Philadelphia and was related to Samuel Miles, a militia general in the Revolutionary War, one of Philadelphia's early mayors and a judge of the High Court of Errors and Appeals. His brother, Richard, a captain in the Revolutionary War, was Hanna' s grandfather.

== Early years ==
Septimus J. Hanna was born one of ten children, to Susanna (née Miles) and Samuel Cook Hanna in Spring Mills, Pennsylvania, on July 29, 1845. The family moved from Center County to Cochranton in Crawford County in western Pennsylvania. His parents were of different religious backgrounds, Scottish-Presbyterian (his father) and Baptist (his mother). Together, they joined the Methodist Episcopal church, where they were active members.

He attended public school there and later, went to Meadville Academy. The onset of war prevented his further education. At the age of eighteen, Hanna enlisted as Stephen J. Hanna in Company H, 138th Illinois Volunteer Infantry, composed largely of soldiers of his own age. He was unanimously elected its captain during the last year of the Civil War. (Note: Hanna's Civil War pension was received in his own name, as Septimus J. Hanna.)

Hanna resumed his education after the war, studying law. He was admitted to the Illinois bar in 1866. Later, he moved to Council Bluffs, Iowa, where on September 21, 1869, he married Camilla Turley, a daughter of a prominent citizen there. He began his law practice in Council Bluffs as part of the firm Sapp, Lyman, and Hanna. At the end of his first year, when he was 23, he was appointed judge of the County Court, then in Council Bluffs. He held the office one and a half years and later served as city attorney for several years. He also served as deputy United States district attorney.

== Legal career (1872–1890) ==
In 1872, the offer of a partnership brought Hanna to Chicago, where he practiced law until late 1879, when failing health caused him to move to Colorado. Settling in the town of Leadville, he worked as a lawyer and register in the U.S. land office. He was register of the United States Land Office in Leadville from 1882 to 1886, after which he practiced law from 1886 to 1890. While in Iowa and Colorado, Hanna took an active interest in politics, supporting the Republican Party, then a young political party.

Hanna and his wife first heard of Christian Science in Leadville in 1885 when two of her friends in Council Bluffs said they were healed by it. His wife, then a semi-invalid, began to look into the new religion. In 1886, she received a copy of the Christian Science textbook, which she studied and saw her health restored. This led Hanna to begin his own investigation of the religion. His reading left him impressed with what he saw as its logic, but he was unable to grasp the book's meaning in its entirety. Although the drier Colorado climate had alleviated some of his health problems, he was not completely recovered. A woman living in New Hampshire helped him in Christian Science and he recovered, becoming so impressed with the experience, that he began a "systematic study" of the religion's textbook.

== Career in Christian Science (1890–1921) ==
In 1890, after studying Christian Science about four years, Hanna left his legal practice to devote himself to "the Cause of Christian Science", although he had no plan of how to proceed. In May 1890, there was a three-day meeting of Mary Baker Eddy's students held in New York City, the fifth annual meeting of the National Christian Science Association (Note: The National Christian Science Association was dissolved in 1892.) and the Hannas decided to attend. While there, Septimus Hanna was invited to take charge of a society of Christian Scientists in Scranton, Pennsylvania. After visiting Scranton, he accepted the invitation, marking the beginning of his career in Christian Science.

During this period, Hanna and his wife were invited to meet Eddy, then living in the Boston neighborhood of Roslindale. He was deeply impressed by her vitality and her spirituality, as well as her interest in world affairs. Speaking of her later in a lecture given in Malden, Massachusetts, Hanna said, "I can truthfully say that intellectually she is one of the most alert persons I have ever known; that she labors incessantly and unselfishly for the cause to which she has devoted her life, and that, notwithstanding her years, she performs an amount of labor each day which if known would seem incredible, even if done by one yet in the adolescence of life."

The Hannas worked in Scranton until autumn 1892, when Eddy appointed Septimus Hanna editor of the Christian Science Journal, and his wife assistant editor. A move to Boston followed.

=== Boston years ===
During the years the Hannas were in Boston, the church organization was taking shape and Hanna served in several key positions. In early 1893, in addition to editing the Journal, Hanna was called to become pastor of The Mother Church. He was also chosen by Eddy to read her address to the World's Parliament of Religions in Chicago. (Note: Mary Baker Eddy had misgivings about Christian Science being represented at the World's Parliament of Religions, but relented to the wishes of her students, who were eager to participate. She wrote to Hanna months before, "I see great aims and results both pro and con to this Congress business.") In 1894, the Bible and the Christian Science textbook were ordained as the "impersonal pastor"; with changes in the church service, Hanna became First Reader. In 1895, around the time the Manual of The Mother Church was published, Eddy wrote a letter to Hanna describing the work of establishing the by-laws that would govern the church, a portion of which was later published in her book Miscellaneous Writings and in the front of the Manual, before the table of contents.

Eddy was reported to have called him "morally statuesque" and in a letter to him, she called him "a born editor". In a letter to her just over two months later in April 1896, he questioned a proposed raise in his salary, fearing the increase could be a corrupting influence on his character. When a weekly periodical, the Christian Science Sentinel began publication in September 1898, Hanna's editorial duties were extended to include the Sentinel, as were those of his wife. Also, in 1898, Hanna was made vice-president of the Massachusetts Metaphysical College, when Eddy established a Board of Education to continue the work of the closed institution. When she taught her last class that same year, Hanna and his wife were invited to attend; both received "the degree of C.S.D." by Eddy.

He continued in these positions until 1902, when he became a member of the Board of Lectureship at Eddy's request. His assigned region being in the western United States and a new church by-law setting a three-year term to the First Reader, Hanna resigned his other positions in June. His wife resigned as well.

=== Later years ===
The Hannas decided to leave Boston and return to the west, moving to Colorado Springs, Colorado, which they thought would be a good central location for them in his work as a Christian Science lecturer.

Hanna's lectures were compared to legal arguments and to a judge's charge to a jury. He remained on the lecture circuit until 1914, lecturing in the United States, British Isles, and Canada.

In 1907, at Eddy's request, Hanna taught the "normal class", the course that trains new teachers of Christian Science. Hanna was the third person to teach the course, aside from Eddy herself. (Note: Initially, the normal class was held annually and the same teacher taught every year. Eddy, who believed in "rotation in office", planned to establish a three-year term limit; the second teacher taught for three years. She then wrote a new by-law, establishing the class term as it is today, with one normal class (course) held once every three years, a different teacher for every term and the class size limited to 30. Hanna was the first to teach under the new by-law.) Aside from the few pupils he had taught in Scranton before moving to Boston, Hanna had not taught Christian Science and was surprised by the request and was initially uncertain about accepting the invitation. His own first primary class was held the following year, in August 1908.

When Eddy died in 1910, Hanna, became president of the Massachusetts Metaphysical College. He was the only person to serve as president other than Eddy and was re-appointed president every year for the rest of his life.

In autumn 1911, they moved to Pasadena, California, and built a house on the corner of Oakland Avenue and Fillmore Street. In 1914, Hanna resigned from the Board of Lectureship; he continued to conduct his annual primary class instruction and association meeting until his death in 1921. For many years, Judge Hanna was a member of the National Geographic Society.

== Selected writings ==
Selected booklets, pamphlets, lectures, chapters, etc.

- Healing through Christian Science. CSPS. 1898.
- Christian Science History. CSPS. 1899.
- "Christian Science: A Practical Religion". Christian Science and Legislation. CSPS. 1906. pp. 51–69.
- "An Appreciation". The Destiny of The Mother Church. CSPS. 1991. pp. 139–152. ISBN 978-0-87510-231-3.
- "Correspondence and Other Exchanges with Mary Baker Eddy". We Knew Mary Baker Eddy. Vol. II (Expanded ed.). CSPS. 2013. pp. 229–261.

Selected editorials

- "Editorial". The Christian Science Journal. XII (6): 259–263. September 1894.
- "Editorial". The Christian Science Journal. XIII (4): 171–173. July 1895.
- "Editorial". The Christian Science Journal. XIII (5): 218–221. August 1895.
- "Editorial". The Christian Science Journal. XVI (4): 292–298. July 1898.

Selected other articles

- "Rev. Mary Baker Eddy". The Granite Monthly. XXI (4): 199–209. October 1896.
- "The Absolute and the Relative". The Christian Science Journal. XXIX (9): 521–528. December 1911.
- "The Tenets". Christian Science Sentinel. XIV (14): 265. 2 December 1911.

== See also ==
- Edmund F. Burton
- William D. McCrackan
- William R. Rathvon
