= Christian Science =

American new religious movement

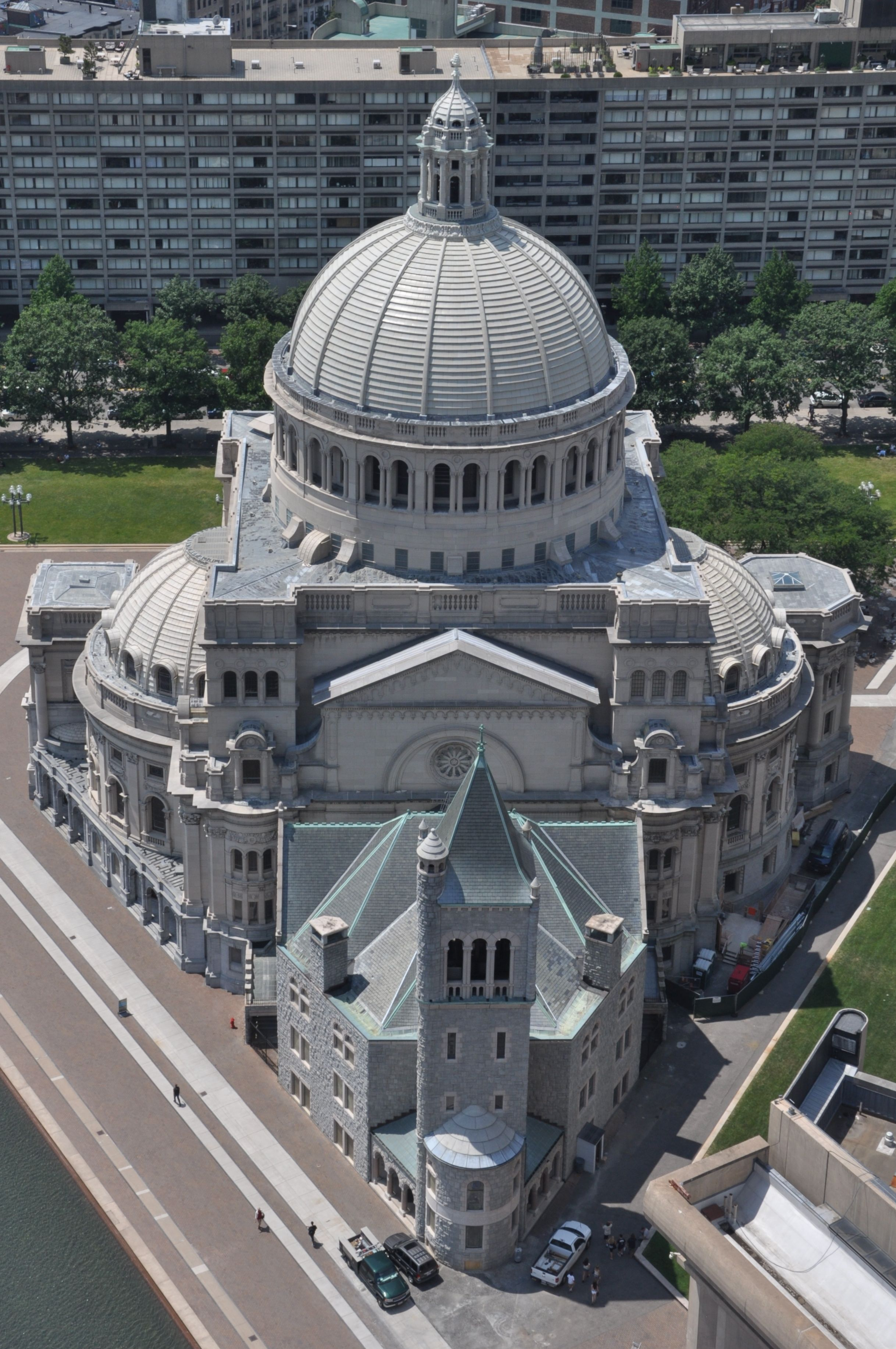
- The First Church of Christ, Scientist at the Christian Science Center in Boston with the original Mother Church (1894) in the foreground and the Mother Church Extension (1906) behind it.
- Classification: Christianity
- Scripture: The Bible and Science and Health with Key to the Scriptures by Mary Baker Eddy
- Theology: "Basic teachings", Church of Christ, Scientist
- Founder: Mary Baker Eddy (1821–1910)
- Members: Estimated 106,000 in the United States in 1990 and under 50,000 in 2009; according to the church, 400,000 worldwide in 2008. (Note: PBS, August 2008: "The church estimates it has about 400,000 members worldwide, but independent studies put membership at around 100,000.")
- Official website: christianscience.com

Christian Science is a nontrinitarian Christian religion whose adherents are members of the Church of Christ, Scientist. Church members are known as Christian Scientists or students of Christian Science, and the church is sometimes informally known as the Christian Science church. It was founded in 1879 in New England by Mary Baker Eddy, who wrote the 1875 book Science and Health with Key to the Scriptures, which outlines the theology of Christian Science. The book was originally called Science and Health; the subtitle with a Key to the Scriptures was added in 1883 and later amended to with Key to the Scriptures. Eddy continued editing this text across the following 35 years until her death in 1910. The book became Christian Science's central textbook, along with the Bible, and by 2001 had sold over nine million copies.

Eddy and 26 followers were granted a charter by the Commonwealth of Massachusetts in 1879 to found the "Church of Christ (Scientist)"; the church would be reorganized under the name "Church of Christ, Scientist" in 1892. The Mother Church, The First Church of Christ, Scientist, was built in Boston, Massachusetts, in 1894. Known as the "thinker's religion", Christian Science became the fastest growing religion in the United States, with nearly 270,000 members by 1936 — a figure which had declined to just over 100,000 by 1990 and reportedly to under 50,000 by 2009. The church is known for its newspaper, The Christian Science Monitor, which won seven Pulitzer Prizes between 1950 and 2002, and for its public Reading Rooms around the world. (Note: In April 2010, the Christian Science Journal listed 1,068 Reading Rooms in the United States and 489 elsewhere.)

Christian Science's religious tenets differ considerably from many other Christian denominations, including key concepts such as the Trinity, the divinity of Jesus, atonement, the resurrection, and the Eucharist. Eddy, for her part, described Christian Science as a return to "primitive Christianity and its lost element of healing". Adherents subscribe to a radical form of philosophical idealism, believing that sin, sickness and death are not produced by God and are therefore illusory. This includes the view that disease is a mental error rather than physical disorder, and that the sick should be treated not by medicine but by a form of prayer that seeks to correct the beliefs responsible for the illusion of ill health.

The church does not require that Christian Scientists avoid medical or surgical care—many adherents use dentists, optometrists, obstetricians, physicians for broken bones, and vaccination when required by law—but maintains that Christian Science prayer is most effective when not combined with medicine. Eddy did not require that her students avoid the study of medicine. The reliance on prayer and avoidance of medical treatment has been blamed for the deaths of adherents and their children. Between the 1880s and 1990s, several parents and others were prosecuted for, and in a few cases convicted of, manslaughter or neglect.

== Overview ==
=== Metaphysical family ===
Several periods of Protestant Christian revival nurtured a proliferation of new religious movements in the United States. In the latter half of the 19th century, these included what came to be known as the metaphysical family: groups such as Christian Science, Divine Science, the Unity School of Christianity, and (later) the United Church of Religious Science. (Note: Dawn Hutchinson, 2014: "Scholars of American religious history have used the term "New Thought" to refer either to individuals and churches that officially joined the International New Thought Alliance (INTA) or to American metaphysical religions affiliated with Phineas Quimby, Mary Baker Eddy, and Emma Curtis Hopkins. New Thought writers shared the idea that God is Mind." John Saliba, 2003: "The Christian Science–Metaphysical Family. This family, known also as 'New Thought' in academic literature, stresses the need to understand the functioning of the human mind in order to achieve the healing of all human ailments. ... Metaphysics/New Thought is a nineteenth-century movement and is exemplified by such groups as the Unity School of Christianity, the United Church of Religious Science, Divine Science Federation International, and Christian Science." James R. Lewis, 2003: "Groups in the metaphysical (Christian Science–New Thought) tradition ... usually claim to have discovered spiritual laws which, if properly understood and applied, transform and improve the lives of ordinary individuals ..." John K. Simmons, 1995: "While members, past and present, of the Christian Science movement understandably claim Mrs. Eddy's truths to be part of a unique and final religious revelation, most outside observers place Christian Science in the metaphysical family of religious organizations ..." Charles S. Braden, 1963: "[I]t was in America that [mesmerism] ... gave rise to a complex of religious faiths varying from one another in significant ways, but all agreeing upon the central fact that healing and for that matter every good thing is possible through a right relationship with the ultimate power in the Universe, Creative Mind—called God, Principle, Life, Wisdom ... "This broad complex of religions is sometimes described by the rather general term 'metaphysical' ... The general movement has proliferated in many directions. Two main streams seem most vigorous: one is called Christian Science; the other, which no single name adequately describes, has come rather generally to be known as New Thought.") From the 1890s, the liberal section of the movement became known as New Thought, in part to distinguish it from the more authoritarian Christian Science.

The term metaphysical referred to the movement's philosophical idealism, a belief in the primacy of the mental world. (Note: John K. Simmons, 1995: "The broad descriptive term 'metaphysical' is not used in a manner common to the trained philosopher. Instead, it denotes the primacy of Mind as the controlling factor in human experience. At the heart of the metaphysical perspective is the theological/ontological affirmation that God is perfect Mind and human beings, in reality, exist in a state of eternal manifestation of that Divine Mind.") Adherents believed that material phenomena were the result of mental states, a view expressed as "life is consciousness" and "God is mind." The supreme cause was referred to as Divine Mind, Truth, God, Love, Life, Spirit, Principle or Father–Mother. William James and others intuited an association with elements of Plato, Hinduism, Berkeley, Hegel, Swedenborg, and transcendentalism.

The metaphysical groups became known as the mind-cure movement because of their strong focus on healing. (Note: William James, 1902: "To my mind a current far more important and interesting religiously ... I will give the title of the Mind-Cure movement. There are various sects of this 'New Thought' ... but their agreements are so profound that their differences may be neglected for my present purposes ..." "Christian Science so-called, the sect of Mrs. Eddy, is the most radical branch of mind-cure in its dealings with evil.") Medical practice was in its infancy, and patients regularly fared better without it. This provided fertile soil for the mind-cure groups, who argued that sickness was an absence of "right thinking" or failure to connect to Divine Mind. The movement traced its roots in the United States to Phineas Parkhurst Quimby (1802–1866), a New England clockmaker turned mental healer. His advertising flyer, "To the Sick" included this explanation of his clairvoyant methodology: "he gives no medicines and makes no outward applications, but simply sits down by the patients, tells them their feelings and what they think is their disease. If the patients admit that he tells them their feelings, &c., then his explanation is the cure; and, if he succeeds in correcting their error, he changes the fluids of the system and establishes the truth, or health. The Truth is the Cure. This mode of practise applies to all cases. If no explanation is given, no charge is made, for no effect is produced." (Note: Philip Jenkins, 2000: "Christian Science and New Thought both emerged from a common intellectual background in mid-nineteenth-century New England, and they shared many influences from an older mystical and magical fringe, including Swedenborgian teachings, Mesmerism, and Transcentalism. The central figure and prophet of the emerging synthesis was Phineas P. Quimby, 'the John the Baptist of Christian Science', whose faith-healing work began in 1838. Quimby and his followers taught the overwhelming importance of thought in shaping reality, a message that was crucial for healing. If disease existed only as thought, then only by curing the mind could the body be set right: disease was a matter of wrong belief.") Mary Baker Eddy had been a patient of his (1862–1865), leading to debate about how much of Christian Science was based on his ideas.

New Thought and Christian Science differed in that Eddy saw her views as a unique and final revelation. (Note: Meredith B. McGuire, 1988: "The most familiar offshoot of the metaphysical movement ... is Christian Science, which was based upon a more extreme interpretation of metaphysical healing than that of the New Thought groups. ... Christian Science is unlike New Thought and other metaphysical movements of that era in that Mary Baker Eddy successfully arrogated to herself all teaching authority, centralized decision-making and organizational power, and developed the movement's sectarian character.") Eddy's idea of malicious animal magnetism (that people can be harmed by the bad thoughts of others) marked another distinction, introducing an element of fear that was absent from the New Thought literature. Most significantly, she dismissed the material world as an illusion, rather than as merely subordinate to Mind, leading her to reject the use of medicine, or materia medica, and making Christian Science the most controversial of the metaphysical groups. Reality for Eddy was purely spiritual. (Note: Charles S. Braden, 1963: "Mary Baker Eddy pushed the postulates of positive thinking to their absolute limit. ... She proposed not merely that the spiritual overshadows the material, but that the material world does not exist. The world of our senses is but an illusion of our minds. If the material world causes us pain, grief, danger and even death, that can be changed by changing our thoughts." Roy M. Anker, 1999: "Mary Baker Eddy, the founder of Christian Science (denominationally known as the Church of Christ, Scientist), the most prominent, successful, controversial, and distinctive of all the groups whose inspiration scholars trace to the healing and intellectual influence of Quimby.")

=== Christian Science theology ===
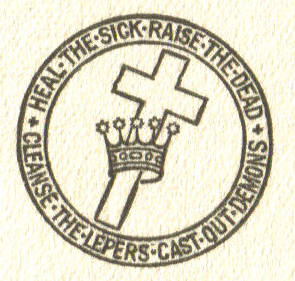
Christian Science seal, with the Cross and Crown and words from Matthew 10:8

Christian Science leaders place their religion within mainstream Christian teaching, according to J. Gordon Melton, and reject any identification with the New Thought movement. (Note: J. Gordon Melton, 1992: "Almost as much as the medical controversy, charges of heresy from orthodox Christian churches have hounded the Church. Leaders of Christian Science insist that they are within the mainstream of Christian teachings, a concern which leads to their strong resentment of any identification with the New Thought movement, which they see as having drifted far from their central Christian affirmations. At the same time, strong differences with traditional Christian teachings concerning the Trinity, the unique divinity of Jesus Christ, atonement for sin, and the creation are undeniable. While using Christian language, Science and Health with Key to Scriptures and Eddy's other writings radically redefine basic theological terms, usually by the process commonly called allegorization. Such redefinitions are most clearly evident in the glossary to Science and Health (pages 579–599)." Rodney Stark, 1998: "But, of course, Christian Science was not just another Protestant sect. Like Joseph Smith, Mary Baker Eddy added too much new religious culture for her movement to qualify fully as a member of the Christian family—as all the leading clerics of the time repeatedly and vociferously pointed out. However, unlike Madame Blavatsky's Theosophical Society, and like the Mormons, Christian Science retained an immense amount of Christian culture. These continuities allowed converts from a Christian background to preserve a great deal of cultural capital.") Eddy was strongly influenced by her Congregationalist upbringing. According to the church's tenets, adherents accept "the inspired Word of the Bible as [their] sufficient guide to eternal Life ... acknowledge and adore one supreme and infinite God ... [and] acknowledge His Son, one Christ; the Holy Ghost or divine Comforter; and man in God's image and likeness." When founding the Church of Christ, Scientist, in April 1879, Eddy wrote that she wanted to "reinstate primitive Christianity and its lost element of healing". Later she suggested that Christian Science was a kind of second coming and that Science and Health was an inspired text. (Note: Mary Baker Eddy, 1891: "The second appearing of Jesus is, unquestionably, the spiritual advent of the advancing idea of God, as in Christian Science." Eddy, January 1901: "I should blush to write of Science and Health with Key to the Scriptures as I have, were it of human origin, and I, apart from God, its author. But, as I was only a scribe echoing the harmonies of heaven in divine metaphysics, I cannot be super-modest in my estimate of the Christian Science textbook.") In 1895, in the Manual of the Mother Church, she ordained the Bible and Science and Health as "Pastor over the Mother Church".

Christian Science theology differs in several respects from that of traditional Christianity. Eddy's Science and Health reinterprets key Christian concepts, including the Trinity, divinity of Jesus, atonement, and resurrection; beginning with the 1883 edition, she added "with a Key to the Scriptures" to the title and included a glossary that redefined the Christian vocabulary. At the core of Eddy's theology is the view that the spiritual world is the only reality and is entirely good, and that the material world, with its evil, sickness and death, is an illusion. Eddy saw humanity as an "idea of Mind" that is "perfect, eternal, unlimited, and reflects the divine", according to Bryan Wilson; what she called "mortal man" is simply humanity's distorted view of itself. Despite her view of the non-existence of evil, an important element of Christian Science theology is that evil thought, in the form of malicious animal magnetism, can cause harm, even if the harm is only apparent.

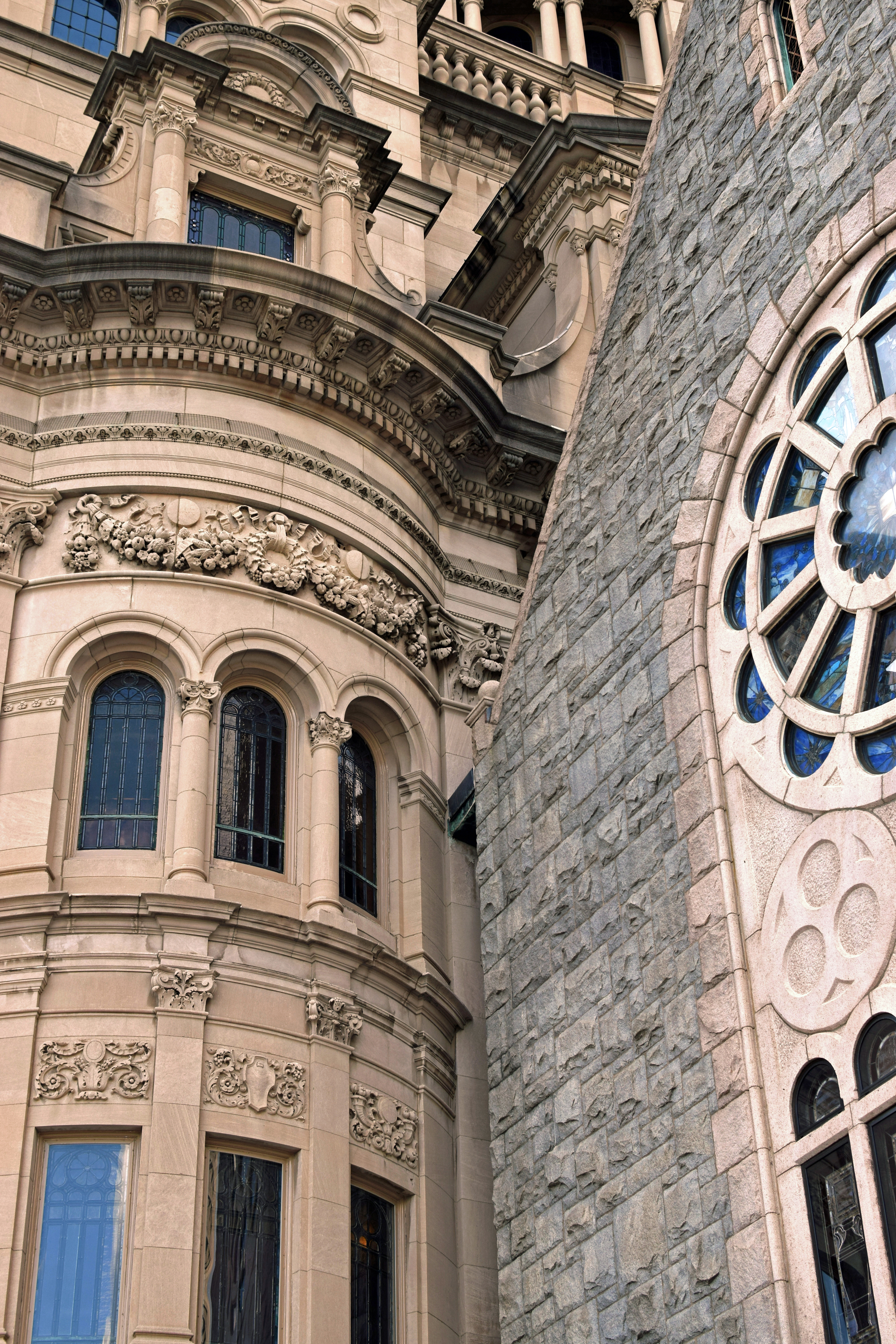
The First Church of Christ, Scientist, Boston

Eddy viewed God not as a person but as "All-in-all". Although she often described God in the language of personhood—she used the term "Father–Mother God" (as did Ann Lee, the founder of Shakerism), and, in the third edition of Science and Health, she referred to God as "she"—God is mostly represented in Christian Science by the synonyms "Mind, Spirit, Soul, Principle, Life, Truth, Love". (Note: Eddy, Science and Health: "Question. – What is God?" Answer. – God is incorporeal, divine, supreme, infinite Mind, Spirit, Soul, Principle, Life, Truth, Love.") The Holy Ghost is Christian Science, and heaven and hell are states of mind. (Note: Wilson 1961: "[T]he Holy Ghost is understood to be Christian Science—the promised Comforter." "Heaven and Hell are understood to be mental states".) There is no supplication in Christian Science prayer. The process involves the Scientist engaging in a silent argument to affirm to herself the unreality of matter, something Christian Science practitioners will do for a fee, including in absentia, to address ill health or other problems. Wilson writes that Christian Science healing is "not curative ... on its own premises, but rather preventative of ill health, accident and misfortune, since it claims to lead to a state of consciousness where these things do not exist. What heals is the realization that there is nothing really to heal." It is a closed system of thought, viewed as infallible if performed correctly; healing confirms the power of Truth, but its absence derives from the failure, specifically the bad thoughts, of individuals.

Eddy accepted as true the creation narrative in the Book of Genesis up to chapter 2, verse 6—that God created man in his image and likeness—but she rejected the rest "as the story of the false and the material", according to Wilson. Her theology is nontrinitarian: she viewed the Trinity as suggestive of polytheism. (Note: Eddy, Science and Health: "The theory of three persons in one God (that is, a personal Trinity or Tri-unity) suggests polytheism, rather than the one ever-present I AM.") She saw Jesus as a Christian Scientist, a "Way-shower" between humanity and God, and she distinguished between Jesus the man and the concept of Christ, the latter a synonym for Truth and Jesus the first person fully to manifest it. The crucifixion was not a divine sacrifice for the sins of humanity, the atonement (the forgiveness of sin through Jesus's suffering) "not the bribing of God by offerings", writes Wilson, but an "at-one-ment" with God. Her views on life after death were vague and, according to Wilson, "there is no doctrine of the soul" in Christian Science: "[A]fter death, the individual continues his probationary state until he has worked out his own salvation by proving the truths of Christian Science." Eddy did not believe that the dead and living could communicate.

To the more conservative of the Protestant clergy, Eddy's view of Science and Health as divinely inspired was a challenge to the Bible's authority. "Eddyism" was viewed as a cult; one of the first uses of the modern sense of the word was in A. H. Barrington's Anti-Christian Cults (1898), a book about Spiritualism, Theosophy and Christian Science. In a few cases Christian Scientists were expelled from Christian congregations, but ministers also worried that their parishioners were choosing to leave. In May 1885 the London Times' Boston correspondent wrote about the "Boston mind-cure craze": "Scores of the most valued Church members are joining the Christian Scientist branch of the metaphysical organization, and it has thus far been impossible to check the defection." In 1907 Mark Twain described the appeal of the new religion to its adherents:

[Mrs. Eddy] has delivered to them a religion which has revolutionized their lives, banished the glooms that shadowed them, and filled them and flooded them with sunshine and gladness and peace; a religion which has no hell; a religion whose heaven is not put off to another time, with a break and a gulf between, but begins here and now, and melts into eternity as fancies of the waking day melt into the dreams of sleep.

They believe it is a Christianity that is in the New Testament; that it has always been there, that in the drift of ages it was lost through disuse and neglect, and that this benefactor has found it and given it back to men, turning the night of life into day, its terrors into myths, its lamentations into songs of emancipation and rejoicing.

There we have Mrs. Eddy as her followers see her. ... They sincerely believe that Mrs. Eddy's character is pure and perfect and beautiful, and her history without stain or blot or blemish. But that does not settle it.

Twain's comment continued as a challenge to Eddy's authorship of Science and Health although he referenced her intensive editing of the book.

== History ==
=== Mary Baker Eddy and the early Christian Science movement ===
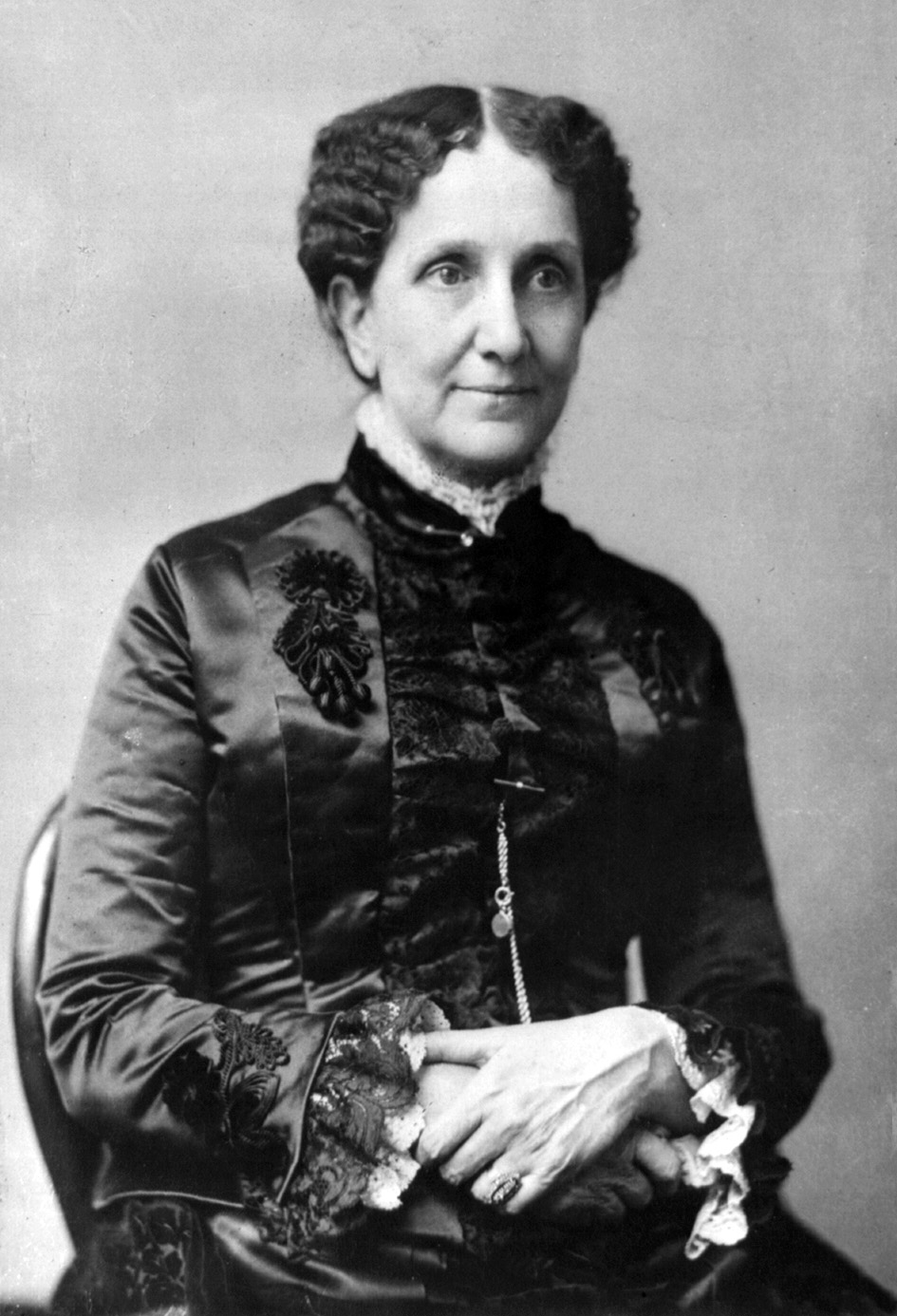
Mary Baker Eddy

Mary Baker Eddy was born Mary Morse Baker on a farm in Bow, New Hampshire, the youngest of six children in a religious family of Congregationalists. In common with most women at the time, Eddy was given little formal education, but read widely at home and was tutored by her brother Albert, a graduate of Dartmouth College. From childhood, she lived with protracted ill health. Eddy's first husband died six months after their marriage and three months before their son was born, leaving her penniless; and as a result of her poor health she lost custody of the boy when he was four. She married again, and her new husband promised to become the child's legal guardian, but after their marriage he refused to sign the needed papers and the boy was taken to Minnesota and told his mother had died. (Note: Per the legal doctrine of coverture, women in the United States could not then be their own children's guardians. Harvard Business School, 2010: "A married woman or feme covert was a dependent, like an underage child or a slave, and could not own property in her own name or control her own earnings, except under very specific circumstances. When a husband died, his wife could not be the guardian to their under-age children.") Eddy, then known as Mary Patterson, and her husband moved to rural New Hampshire, where Eddy continued to suffer from health problems which often kept her bedridden. Eddy tried various cures for her health problems, including conventional medicine as well as many forms of alternative medicine such as Grahamism, electrotherapy, homeopathy, hydropathy, and finally mesmerism under Phineas Quimby. She was later accused by critics, beginning with Julius Dresser, Quimby's protege, of borrowing ideas from Quimby in what biographer Gillian Gill would call the "single most controversial issue" of her life.

In February 1866, Eddy fell on the ice in Lynn, Massachusetts. Eddy claims she had severe injuries, but a few days later she apparently asked for her Bible, opened it to an account of one of Jesus' miracles, and left her bed telling her friends that she was healed through prayer alone. The moment has since been controversial, but she considered this moment one of the "falling apples" that helped her to understand Christian Science, although she said she did not fully understand it at the time.

In 1866, after her fall on the ice, Eddy began teaching her first student and began writing her ideas which she eventually published in Science and Health with Key to the Scriptures, considered her most important work. Her students voted to form a church called the Church of Christ (Scientist) in 1879, later reorganized as The First Church of Christ, Scientist, also known as The Mother Church, in 1892. She founded the Massachusetts Metaphysical College in 1881 to continue teaching students, Eddy started a number of periodicals: The Christian Science Journal in 1883, the Christian Science Sentinel in 1898, The Herald of Christian Science in 1903, and The Christian Science Monitor in 1908, the latter being a secular newspaper. The Monitor has gone on to win seven Pulitzer prizes as of 2011. She also wrote numerous books and articles in addition to Science and Health, including the Manual of The Mother Church which contained by-laws for church government and member activity, and founded the Christian Science Publishing Society in 1898 in order to distribute Christian Science literature. Although the movement started in Boston, the first purpose-built Christian Science church building was erected in 1886 in Oconto, Wisconsin. During Eddy's lifetime, Christian Science spread throughout the United States and to other parts of the world including Canada, Great Britain, Germany, South Africa, Hong Kong, the Philippines, Australia, and elsewhere.

Eddy encountered significant opposition after she began teaching and writing on Christian Science, which only increased towards the end of her life. One of the most prominent examples was Mark Twain, who wrote a number of articles on Eddy and Christian Science which were first published in Cosmopolitan magazine in 1899 and were later published as a book. Another extended criticism, which again was first serialized in a magazine and then published in book form, was Georgine Milmine and Willa Cather's The Life of Mary Baker G. Eddy and the History of Christian Science which first appeared in McClure's magazine in January 1907. Also in 1907, several of Eddy's relatives filed an unsuccessful lawsuit instigated by the New York World, known in the press as the "Next Friends Suit", against members of Eddy's household, alleging that she was mentally unable to manage her own affairs. The suit fell apart after Eddy was interviewed in her home in August 1907 by the judge and two court-appointed masters (one a psychiatrist) who concluded that she was mentally competent. Separately, she was seen by two psychiatrists, including Allan McLane Hamilton, who came to the same conclusion. The McClure's and New York World stories are considered to at least partially be the reason Eddy asked the church in July 1908 to found the Christian Science Monitor as a platform for responsible journalism.

Eddy died two years later, on the evening of Saturday, December 3, 1910, aged 89. The Mother Church announced at the end of the Sunday morning service that Eddy had "passed from our sight". The church stated that "the time will come when there will be no more death," but that Christian Scientists "do not look for [Eddy's] return in this world." Her estate was valued at $1.5 million, most of which she left to the church.

=== The Christian Science movement after 1910 ===
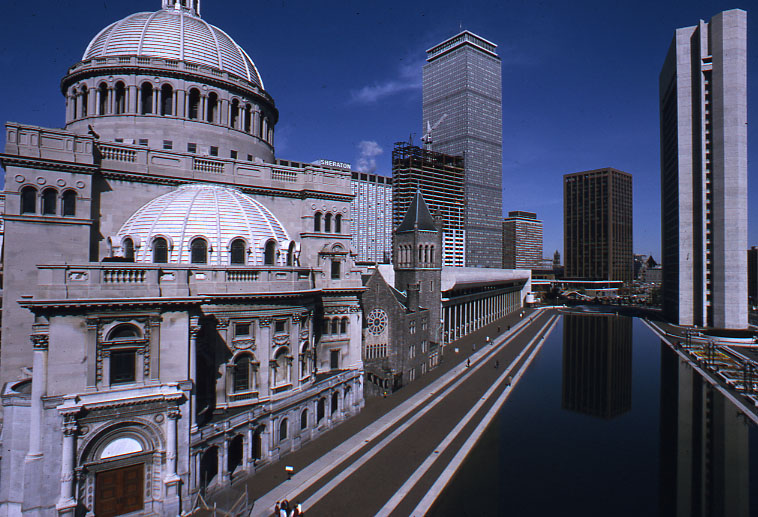
The First Church of Christ, Scientist, 1974

In the aftermath of Eddy's death, some newspapers speculated that the church would fall apart, while others expected it to continue just as it had before. As it was, the movement continued to grow in the first few decades after 1910. The Manual of the Mother Church prohibits the church from publishing membership figures, (Note: Manual of the Mother Church: "Christian Scientists shall not report for publication the number of the members of The Mother Church, nor that of the branch churches. According to the Scripture they shall turn away from personality and numbering the people.") and it is not clear exactly when the height of the movement was. A 1936 census counted c. 268,915 Christian Scientists in the United States (2,098 per million), and Rodney Stark believes this to be close to the height. However, the number of Christian Science churches continued to increase until around 1960, at which point there was a reversal and, since then, many churches have closed their doors. The number of Christian Science practitioners in the United States began to decline in the 1940s according to Stark. According to J. Gordon Melton, in 1972 there were 3,237 congregations worldwide, of which roughly 2,400 were in the United States; and, in the following ten years, about 200 congregations were closed.

During the years after Eddy's death, the church has gone through a number of hardships and controversies. This included attempts to make practicing Christian Science illegal in the United States and elsewhere; a period known as the Great Litigation which involved two intertwined lawsuits regarding church governance; persecution under the Nazi and Communist regimes in Germany and the Imperial regime in Japan; a series of lawsuits involving the deaths of members of the church, most notably some children; and a controversial decision to publish a book by Bliss Knapp. In conjunction with the Knapp book controversy, there was controversy within the church involving The Monitor Channel, part of The Christian Science Monitor which had been losing money, and which eventually led to the channel shutting down. Acknowledging their earlier mistake, of accepting a multi-million dollar publishing incentive to offset broadcasting losses, the Christian Science Board Of Directors, with the concurrence of the Trustees of the Christian Science Publishing Society, withdrew Destiny of The Mother Church from publication in September 2023. In addition, it has since its beginning been branded as a cult by more fundamentalist strains of Christianity, and attracted significant opposition as a result. A number of independent teachers and alternative movements of Christian Science have emerged since its founding, but none of these individuals or groups have achieved the prominence of the Christian Science church.

Despite the hardships and controversies, many Christian Science churches and Reading Rooms remain in existence around the world, and, in recent years, there have been reports of the religion growing in Africa, though it remains significantly behind other evangelical groups. The Christian Science Monitor also remains a well-respected non-religious paper which is especially noted for its international reporting and lack of partisanship.

== Healing practices ==
=== Christian Science prayer ===
[A]ll healing is a metaphysical process. That means that there is no person to be healed, no material body, no patient, no matter, no illness, no one to heal, no substance, no person, no thing and no place that needs to be influenced. This is what the practitioner must first be clear about.

— Practitioner Frank Prinz-Wondollek, 2011.

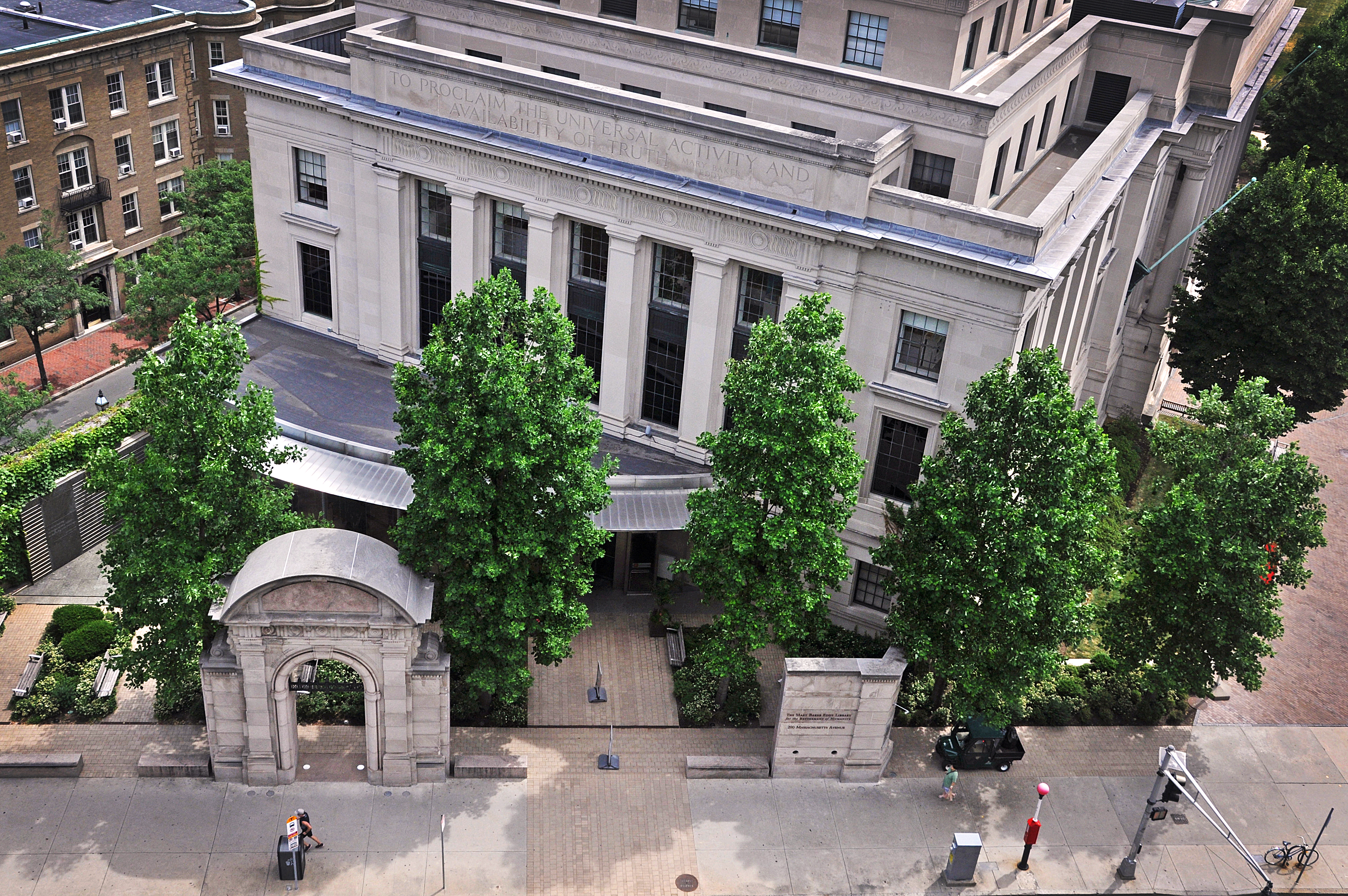
Mary Baker Eddy Library, 200 Massachusetts Avenue, Boston

Christian Scientists avoid almost all medical treatment, relying instead on Christian Science prayer. This consists of silently arguing with oneself; there are no appeals to a personal god, and no set words. Caroline Fraser wrote in 1999 that the practitioner might repeat: "the allness of God using Eddy's seven synonyms—Life, Truth, Love, Spirit, Soul, Principle and Mind," then that "Spirit, Substance, is the only Mind, and man is its image and likeness; that Mind is intelligence; that Spirit is substance; that Love is wholeness; that Life, Truth, and Love are the only reality." She might deny other religions, the existence of evil, mesmerism, astrology, numerology, and the symptoms of whatever the illness is. She concludes, Fraser writes, by asserting that disease is a lie, that this is the word of God, and that it has the power to heal.

Christian Science practitioners are certified by the Church of Christ, Scientist, to charge a fee for Christian Science prayer. There were 1,249 practitioners worldwide in 2015; in the United States in 2010 they charged $25–$50 for an e-mail, telephone or face-to-face consultation. Their training is a two-week, 12-lesson course called "primary class", based on the Recapitulation chapter of Science and Health. Practitioners wanting to teach primary class take a six-day "normal class", held in Boston once every three years, and become Christian Science teachers. There are also Christian Science nursing homes. They offer no medical services; the nurses are Christian Scientists who have completed a course of religious study and training in basic skills, such as feeding and bathing.

The Christian Science Journal and Christian Science Sentinel publish anecdotal healing testimonials (they published 53,900 between 1900 and April 1989), which must be accompanied by statements from three verifiers: "people who know [the testifier] well and have either witnessed the healing or can vouch for [the testifier's] integrity in sharing it". Philosopher Margaret P. Battin wrote in 1999 that the seriousness with which these testimonials are treated by Christian Scientists ignores factors such as false positives caused by self-limiting conditions. Because no negative accounts are published, the testimonials strengthen people's tendency to rely on anecdotes. A church study published in 1989 examined 10,000 published testimonials, 2,337 of which the church said involved conditions that had been medically diagnosed, and 623 of which were "medically confirmed by follow-up examinations". The report offered no evidence of the medical follow-up. The Massachusetts Committee for Children and Youth listed among the report's flaws that it had failed to compare the rates of successful and unsuccessful Christian Science treatment.

Nathan Talbot, a church spokesperson, told the New England Journal of Medicine in 1983 that church members were free to choose medical care, but according to former Christian Scientists those who do may be ostracized. In 2010 the New York Times reported church leaders as saying that, for over a year, they had been "encouraging members to see a physician if they feel it is necessary", and that they were repositioning Christian Science prayer as a supplement to medical care, rather than a substitute. The church has lobbied to have the work of Christian Science practitioners covered by insurance.

As of 2015, it was reported that Christian Scientists in Australia were not advising anyone against vaccines, and the religious exception was deemed "no longer current or necessary". In 2021, a church Committee on Publication reiterated that although vaccination was an individual choice, that the church did not dictate against it, and those who were not vaccinated did not do so because of any "church dogma".

The failure of Christian Science prayer to heal the cancer that killed his mother is what caused Metallica singer James Hetfield to write the 1991 song "The God That Failed". She died of cancer after refusing medical attention, solely relying on her belief in God to heal her.

== Church of Christ, Scientist ==
=== Governance ===
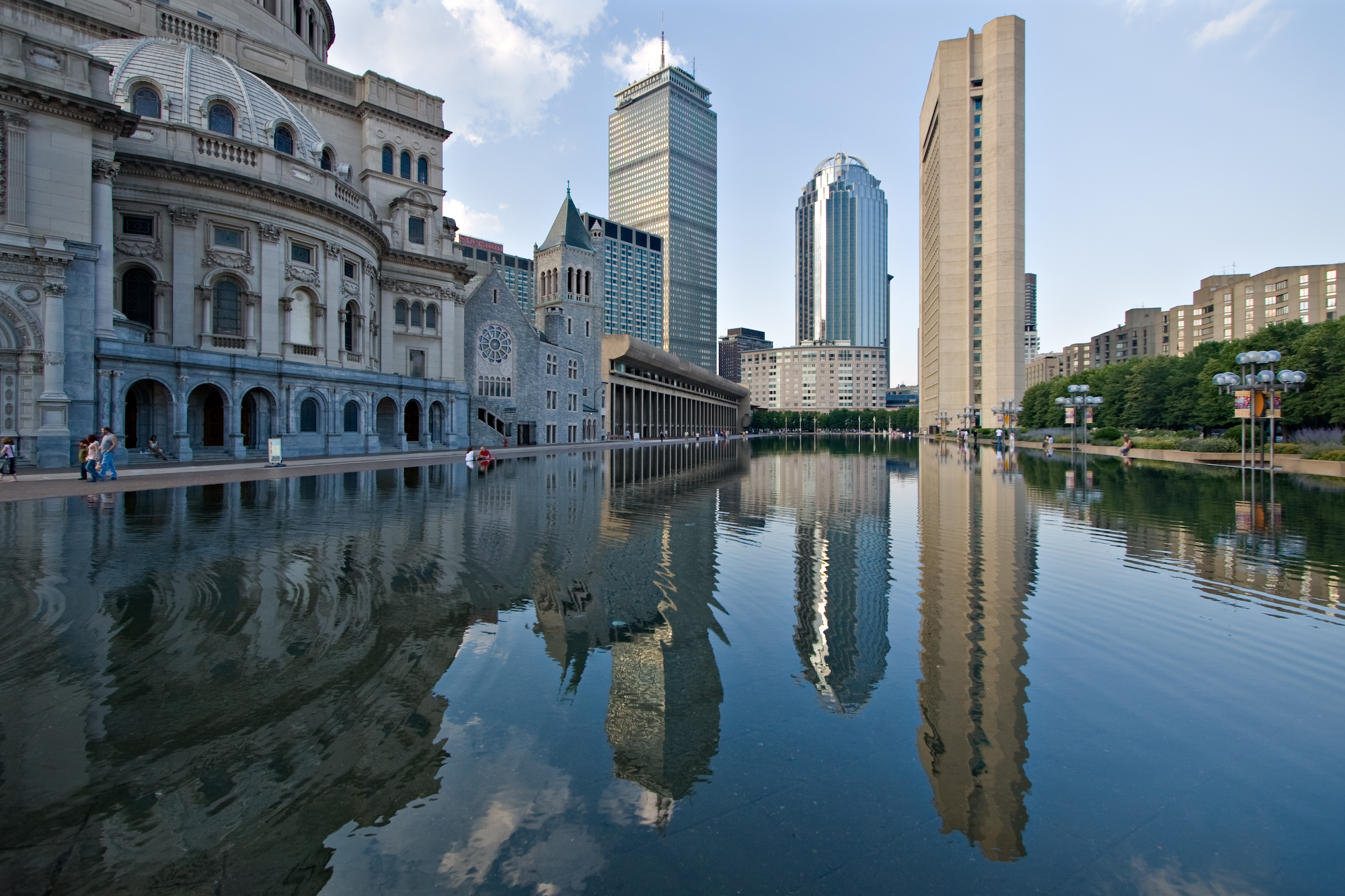
The First Church of Christ, Scientist, Boston

In the hierarchy of the Church of Christ, Scientist, only the Mother Church in Boston, The First Church of Christ, Scientist, uses the definite article in its name. Otherwise the first Christian Science church in any city is called First Church of Christ, Scientist, then Second Church of Christ, Scientist, and so on, followed by the name of the city (for example, Third Church of Christ, Scientist, London). When a church closes, the others in that city are not renamed.

Founded in April 1879, the Church of Christ, Scientist is led by a president and five-person board of directors. There is a public-relations department, known as the Committee on Publication, with representatives around the world; this was set up by Eddy in 1898 to protect her own and the church's reputation. The church was accused in the 1990s of silencing internal criticism by firing staff, delisting practitioners and excommunicating members.

The church's administration is headquartered on Christian Science Center on the corner of Massachusetts Avenue and Huntington Avenue, located on several acres in the Back Bay section of Boston. The 14.5-acre site includes the Mother Church (1894), Mother Church Extension (1906), the Christian Science Publishing Society building (1934)—which houses the Mary Baker Eddy Library and the church's administrative staff—the Sunday School building (1971), and the Church Colonnade building (1972). It also includes the 26-story Administration Building (1972), designed by Araldo Cossutta of I. M. Pei & Associates, which until 2008 housed the administrative staff from the church's 15 departments. There is also a children's fountain and a 690 ft × 100 ft (210 m × 30 m) reflecting pool.

=== Manual of The Mother Church ===
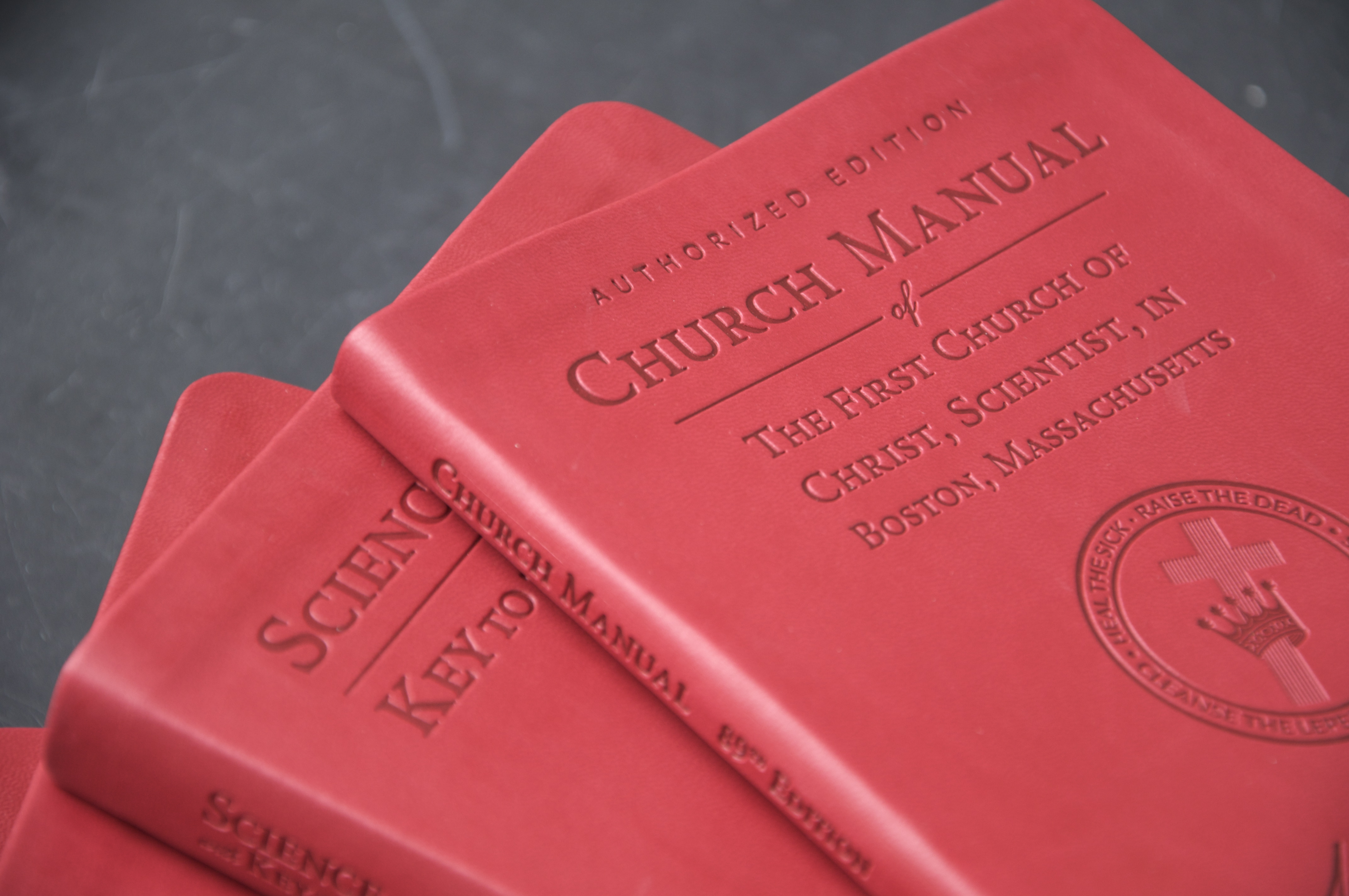
Eddy's Manual of The Mother Church, 89th edition

Eddy's Manual of The Mother Church (first published 1895) lists the church's by-laws. Requirements for members include daily prayer and daily study of the Bible and Science and Health. (Note: Members are expected to pray each day: "Thy kingdom come; let the reign of divine Truth, Life, and Love be established in me, and rule out of me all sin; and may Thy Word enrich the affections of all mankind, and govern them!") Members must subscribe to church periodicals if they can afford to, and pay an annual tax to the church of not less than one dollar.

Prohibitions include engaging in mental malpractice; visiting a store that sells "obnoxious" books; joining other churches; publishing articles that are uncharitable toward religion, medicine, the courts or the law; and publishing the number of church members. The manual also prohibits engaging in public debate about Christian Science without board approval, and learning hypnotism. It includes "The Golden Rule": "A member of The Mother Church shall not haunt Mrs. Eddy's drive when she goes out, continually stroll by her house, or make a summer resort near her for such a purpose."

=== Services ===
The Church of Christ, Scientist is a lay church which has no ordained clergy or rituals, and performs no baptisms; with clergy of other faiths often performing marriage or funeral services since they have no clergy of their own. Its main religious texts are the Bible and Science and Health. Each church has two Readers, who read aloud a "Bible lesson" or "lesson sermon" made up of selections from those texts during the Sunday service, and a shorter set of readings to open Wednesday evening testimony meetings. In addition to readings, members offer testimonials during the main portion of the Wednesday meetings, including recovery from ill health attributed to prayer. There are also hymns, time for silent prayer, and repeating together the Lord's Prayer at each service.

=== Notable members ===
Notable adherents of Christian Science have included Directors of Central Intelligence William H. Webster and Admiral Stansfield M. Turner; and Richard Nixon's chief of staff H. R. Haldeman and Chief Domestic Advisor John Ehrlichman. The viscounts Waldorf and Nancy Astor, the latter of whom was the first female member of British Parliament, were both Christian Scientists; as were two other early women in Parliament, Thelma Cazalet-Keir and Margaret Wintringham. Thelma's brother Victor Cazalet was also a member of the church. Another was naval officer Charles Lightoller, who survived the sinking of the Titanic in 1912. Other adherents in the United States government also include Senator Jocelyn Burdick, Governor Scott McCallum, and Treasury Secretary Henry Paulson. A number of suffragists were Christian Scientists including Vida Goldstein, Muriel Matters, and Nettie Rogers Shuler. Businesswomen Martha Matilda Harper and Bette Nesmith Graham were both Christian Scientists. As was the founder of the Braille Institute of America, J. Robert Atkinson.

In sports, Harry Porter, Harold Bradley Jr., and George Sisler were all adherents. Christian Scientists within the film industry, include Carol Channing and Jean Stapleton; Colleen Dewhurst; Joan Crawford, Doris Day, George Hamilton, Mary Pickford, Ginger Rogers, Mickey Rooney; Horton Foote; King Vidor; Robert Duvall, and Val Kilmer. Those raised by Christian Scientists include biographer John Matteson, jurist Helmuth James Graf von Moltke, military analyst Daniel Ellsberg; Ellen DeGeneres, Henry Fonda, Audrey Hepburn; James Hetfield, Marilyn Monroe, Robin Williams, Elizabeth Taylor, and Anne Archer. Four prominent African American entertainers who have been associated with Christian Science are Pearl Bailey, Lionel Hampton, Everett Lee, and Alfre Woodard.

=== Christian Science Publishing Society ===
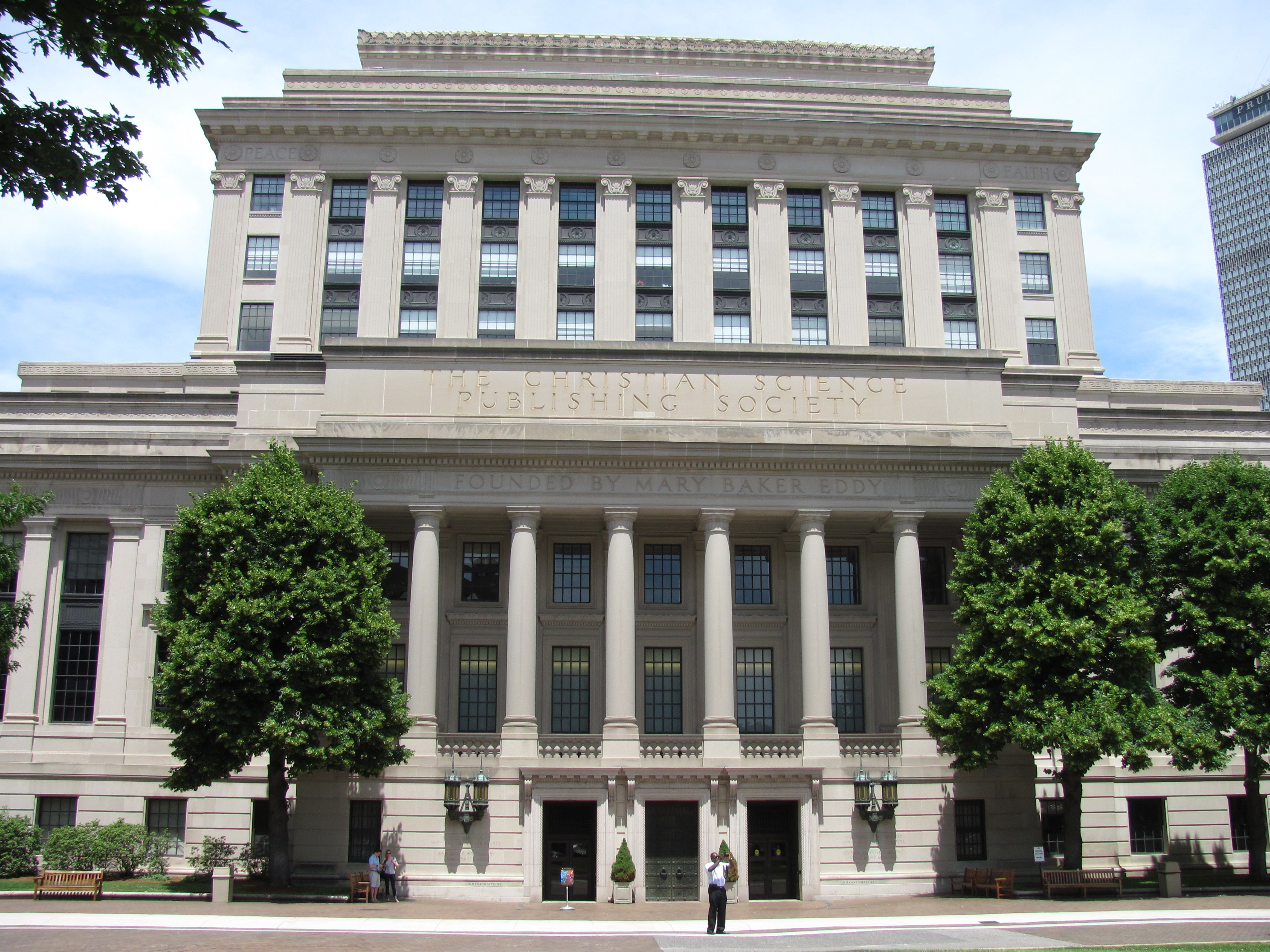
The Christian Science Publishing Society, Massachusetts Avenue, Boston

The Christian Science Publishing Society publishes several periodicals, including the Christian Science Monitor, winner of seven Pulitzer Prizes between 1950 and 2002. This had a daily circulation in 1970 of 220,000, which by 2008 had contracted to 52,000. In 2009 it moved to a largely online presence with a weekly print run. In the 1980s the church produced its own television programs; in 1991 it founded a 24-hour news channel, which closed with heavy losses after 13 months.

The church also publishes the weekly Christian Science Sentinel, the monthly Christian Science Journal, and the Herald of Christian Science, a non-English publication. In April 2012 JSH-Online made back issues of the Journal, Sentinel and Herald available online to subscribers.

=== Works by Mary Baker Eddy ===
- Science and Health with Key to the Scriptures (1875)
- Christian Healing (1880)
- The People's Idea of God: Its Effect on Health and Christianity (1883)
- Historical Sketch of Metaphysical Healing (1885)
- Defence of Christian Science (1885)
- No and Yes (1887)
- Rudiments and Rules of Divine Science (1887)
- Unity of Good and Unreality of Evil (1888)
- Retrospection and Introspection (1891)
- Christ and Christmas (1893)
- Rudimental Divine Science (1894)
- Manual of The Mother Church (1895)
- Pulpit and Press (1895)
- Miscellaneous Writings, 1883–1896 (1897)
- Christian Science versus Pantheism (1898)
- The Christian Science Hymnal (1898)
- Christian Healing and the People's Idea of God (1908)
- Poems (1910)
- The First Church of Christ, Scientist, and Miscellany (1913)
- Prose Works Other than Science and Health (1925)

== See also ==
- Affirmative prayer – Prayer focusing on desired outcomes
- Faith healing – Prayer and gestures perceived to bring divine intervention in physical healing
- New religious movement – Religious community or spiritual group of modern origin
- New Thought – 19th-century American spiritual movement
- Principia College – Private liberal arts college in Elsah, Illinois, U.S.
- Therapeutic nihilism – View that medical treatment is futile
- Third Great Awakening – Period of religious activism in American history in the 19th and early 20th centuries

== Citations ==
=== Sources ===
- Bates, Ernest S.; Dittemore, John V. (1932). Mary Baker Eddy: The Truth and the Tradition. New York: A. A. Knopf.
- Beasley, Norman (1956). The Continuing Spirit. New York: Duell, Sloan & Pearce.
- Fraser, Caroline (1999). God's Perfect Child. New York: Henry Holt & Co.
- Fuller, Linda K. (2011). The Christian Science Monitor: An Evolving Experiment in Journalism. ABC-CLIO. ISBN 978-0-31337994-9. Archived from the original on November 1, 2022.
- Gardner, Martin (August 22, 1999). "Mind Over Matter". Los Angeles Times.
- Gill, Gillian (1998). Mary Baker Eddy. Reading, MA: Perseus Books. ISBN 978-0-73820042-2.
- Gottschalk, Stephen (2006). Rolling Away the Stone: Mary Baker Eddy's Challenge to Materialism. Bloomington, IN: Indiana University Press.
- Knee, Stuart E. (1994). Christian Science in the Age of Mary Baker Eddy. Westport, CT: Greenwood Publishing Co. ISBN 978-0-31328360-4.
- Koestler-Grack, Rachel A. (2004). Mary Baker Eddy. Philadelphia: Chelsea House Publishers. ISBN 978-0-79107866-2.
- Margolick, David (August 6, 1990). "In Child Deaths, a Test for Christian Science". The New York Times.
- Melton, J. Gordon (1992). Encyclopedic Handbook of Cults in America. New York: Garland Pub.
- Milmine, Georgine; Cather, Willa (1909). The Life of Mary Baker G. Eddy and the History of Christian Science. New York: Doubleday.
- Peel, Robert (1971). Mary Baker Eddy: The Years of Trial. New York: Holt, Rinehart and Winston. ISBN 9780030867002.
- Voorhees, Amy B. (2021). A New Christian Identity: Christian Science Origins and Experience in American Culture. Chapel Hill, NC: University of North Carolina Press.
