= Christian Science Publishing Society =

Publishing arm of the First Church of Christ, Scientist, in Massachusetts, US

Coordinates: 42°20′42.4″N 71°5′9.3″W

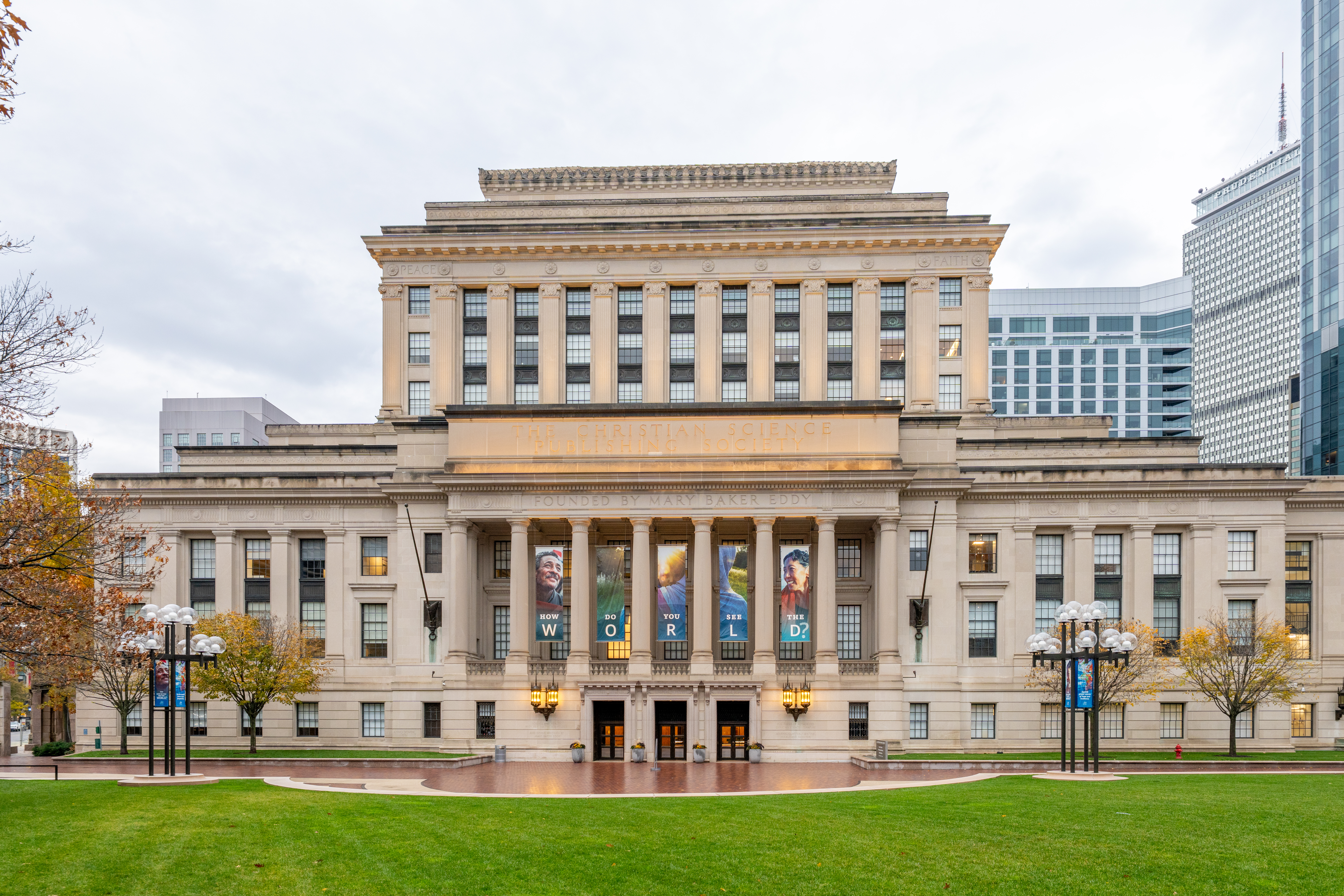
- Parent company: The First Church of Christ, Scientist
- Founded: 1898
- Founder: Mary Baker Eddy
- Country of origin: United States
- Headquarters location: 210 Massachusetts Ave. Boston, Massachusetts
- Publication types: Books, periodicals
- Official website: jsh.christianscience.com

The Christian Science Publishing Society was established in 1898 by Mary Baker Eddy and is the publishing arm of The First Church of Christ, Scientist in Boston, Massachusetts.

== Origin and purpose ==
The Christian Science Publishing Society and the Board of Trustees that manage it were established by Mary Baker Eddy in a deed of trust on January 25, 1898, under the auspices of The First Church of Christ, Scientist. Although she had not wanted to create a separate trust to handle the church's publications, legal considerations made it necessary. Written in the deed is Eddy's express intent for the Publishing Society, that it is "for the purpose of more effectually promoting and extending the religion of Christian Science as taught by me." Always concerned about the purity of the teaching, she was reported by her student Septimus J. Hanna to have said just days before signing the deed, that she wanted "to protect and preserve the literature of [Christian Science] in its purity". She wanted to protect her teachings from "aggressive attempts" to adulterate them, which she felt would wreak havoc within the church and would cause misrepresentations of her teachings, both within and outside the church.

== Publications ==
In addition to Mary Baker Eddy’s works, they publish a number of periodicals, including the monthly The Christian Science Journal, the weekly Christian Science Sentinel, The Herald of Christian Science published in a number of languages; and the Christian Science Quarterly, also published in a number of languages. The Quarterly contains the Bible lessons used as sermons in Sunday services in all Christian Science churches around the world. They also publish biographies of Eddy and other books and study materials on Christian Science.

There is also an international weekly newspaper, The Christian Science Monitor, which has won several Pulitzer Prizes. The Monitor is a secular newspaper; however, there is one religious article in each issue.

The Publishing Society is managed by a three-person Board of Trustees under the authority of the Christian Science Board of Directors. It is located, along with the Mary Baker Eddy Library, in the Publishing Society building at the Christian Science Center in Boston's Back Bay. It is the primary publisher of the writings of Mary Baker Eddy and other Christian Science literature.

== See also ==
- Manual of The Mother Church
