= The Herald of Christian Science =

Christian Science magazine

- Categories: Christian
- Frequency: Monthly and quarterly
- Format: Print, radio, and online
- Publisher: Christian Science Publishing Society
- Founder: Mary Baker Eddy
- First issue: May 1, 1903; 123 years ago
- Language: German, French, Spanish, Portuguese, as well as informal translations in various other languages
- Website: herald.christianscience.com

The Herald of Christian Science is a magazine published in multiple languages by the Christian Science Publishing Society. It was first published as a German magazine in 1903, and grew to include other languages as well. The magazine is currently published in four languages (Note: Der Herold (German, first published 1903); Le Héraut (French, 1918); El Heraldo (Spanish, 1946); and O Arauto (Portuguese, 1947)) with informal translations in 10 other languages including braille. The Herald was the third Christian Science periodical after the Journal and Sentinel, which were first published in 1883 and 1898 respectively. Until the 1990s the magazine was bilingual, with English and translated texts side by side. Along with articles and accounts of healing, each issue includes a directory of Christian Science churches, practitioners and other listings applicable to each language. There is also a Herald radio program. Back issues of the Herald, along with the Journal and Sentinel, are made available at Christian Science Reading Rooms and also at some university and public libraries.
