= William R. Rathvon =

American Christian Scientist

William R. Rathvon was the only eyewitness who heard Lincoln's Gettysburg Address to leave an audio recollection

William Roedel Rathvon, CSB, (December 31, 1854 – March 2, 1939), sometimes incorrectly referred to as William V. Rathvon or William V. Rathbone, is the only known eyewitness to Abraham Lincoln's Gettysburg Address, of the over 10,000 witnesses, to have left an audio recording describing that experience. He was nine years old when he personally saw the address live with his family, and made the recording in 1938, a year before his death. A graduate of Franklin and Marshall College in Lancaster, Pennsylvania, and a successful businessman, he became a Christian Science practitioner, served as a public lecturer, Church treasurer and director of The First Church of Christ, Scientist in Boston, Massachusetts. He was treasurer from 1911 until he was elected to the Church's Board of Directors, on which he served from 1918 until his death in 1939. From 1908 to 1910 he was correspondence secretary for Christian Science founder Mary Baker Eddy. He also authored "The Devil's Auction", often republished without attribution as "The Devil's Garage Sale".

== Early years ==
Rathvon was born in 1854 in Lancaster, Pennsylvania, where he attended grammar school and college. His mother had met his father while attending the Lutheran College in Gettysburg and her entire family, the Forneys, resided in and around Gettysburg.

== At Gettysburg ==
On November 19, 1863, four months after the historic Battle of Gettysburg in Pennsylvania, a crowd of more than 10,000 gathered at Gettysburg, Pennsylvania, for the dedication of the National Cemetery to the soldiers who had fallen in what is widely acknowledged as the greatest battle of the Civil War (in terms of the total number of troops engaged and casualties on both sides, the intensity of the fighting, and the strategic and emotional significance of the outcome) as well as the point at which the war turned in favor of the Union and permanently against the Confederacy. Among those thousands was nine-year-old William Rathvon, who had traveled with his family from nearby Lancaster to hear President Lincoln speak.

In a 30-minute recording, Rathvon describes searching the battlefield for souvenirs with his friends and finding Confederate muskets thrown into the bottom of a creek. He also describes the experiences of his relatives during the battle, including his uncle’s farm being used as the headquarters for Confederate General Richard Ewell and his grandmother hiding Union soldiers from capture by Southern troops.

Like most people who came to Gettysburg, the Rathvon family was aware that the president of the United States, Abraham Lincoln, was going to make some remarks. The family went to the town square where the procession was to form to go out to the cemetery that had not been completed yet. At the head of the procession rode Abraham Lincoln on a gray horse preceded by a military band that was the first the young boy had ever seen. Rathvon describes Lincoln as so tall and with such long legs that they went almost to the ground; he also mentions the long eloquent speech given by Edward Everett of Massachusetts, whom Rathvon described as the "most finished orator of the day." Rathvon then goes on to describe how Lincoln stepped forward and "with a manner serious almost to sadness, gave his brief address."

During the delivery, along with some other boys, young Rathvon wiggled his way forward through the crowd until he stood within 15 feet of Mr. Lincoln and looked up into what he described as Lincoln's "serious face." Rathvon recalls candidly that, although he listened "intently to every word the president uttered and heard it clearly," he explains, "boylike, I could not recall any of it afterwards." But he explains that if anyone said anything disparaging about "honest Abe," there would have been a "junior battle of Gettysburg." In the recording Rathvon speaks of Lincoln's speech allegorically "echoing through the hills."

== Education and career ==
Rathvon attended Franklin and Marshall College in Lancaster, Pennsylvania from 1870 to 1873. By the early 1890s he was in Colorado working as a successful businessman until he was wiped out financially in the Panic of 1893. Visiting Chicago soon after with his wife, they became acquainted with Christian Science, and his wife turned to it for healing. He attended the Massachusetts Metaphysical College's primary class in 1903 and returned for the normal (teachers) class in 1907. From 1908 to 1910 he was a corresponding secretary to Mary Baker Eddy. He remained active in the Christian Science church from that time on until his death, holding a number of positions: member of the Christian Science Board of Lectureship (1911–18); editor, director, and treasurer of The Mother Church (1918); and trustee of the Christian Science Benevolent Association and the Christian Science Pleasant View Home Association. He wrote for the Christian Science Journal and Christian Science Sentinel, two of the church's periodicals. He also lectured on Christian Science, travelling extensively and he taught classes on the subject until his death in Brookline, Massachusetts, in 1939. He wrote "The Devil's Auction" in 1911, an allegory that has been widely copied, often with modifications, and used in sermons as "The Devil's Garage Sale", its origin assumed to be author unknown.

== Marriage and family ==
Rathvon was married three times. In 1877 he married Lillie K. Stauffer and they had one son. Lillie Rathvon died in 1880 and in 1883 he married Ella J. Stauffer. She died in 1923 and two years later he married Lora C. Woodbury. William Rathvon died on March 2, 1939, age 84.

== Reminiscences ==
Rathvon recorded his reminiscences of Abraham Lincoln's Gettysburg Address at the Boston studios of radio station WRUL on February 12, 1938, Lincoln's birthday. In the recording, he recalled attending the dedication of the Gettysburg National Cemetery and hearing Lincoln deliver the Gettysburg Address when Rathvon was nine years old.

The Rathvon audio recollections were known by a small circle of individuals from the time of their recording in 1938. To Rathvon, they were incidental to what he felt were his more important church-work responsibilities. He presumably made the recordings for historical posterity, but never promoted or sold them, dying the following year in 1939.

== Preservation ==
As a teacher of Christian Science, Rathvon was required to organize an association of his students whose training and support was a lifelong commitment for him, and for whom he was required hold an annual reunion and an annual address. Typically, a Christian Science teacher's association survives them and continues to meet annually for many years. Rathvon's association of students continued to distribute copies of this recording, with some invariably ending up in the estates of deceased students whose families had no information on the recording's source. The recording sent to National Public Radio ("NPR") in the late 1990s as part of their "Quest for Sound" project was such a recording; the family knew only that they had in their possession a recording by a man named Rathvon who claimed to have heard Lincoln give his Gettysburg Address. NPR aired it after doing some background research and continues to air it around Lincoln's birthday. Because a number of copies of the recording exist, it continues to surface from time to time and be "rediscovered."

== See also ==
- Gettysburg Address
- Abraham Lincoln
