= Christian Science practitioner =

Faith healing prayer professional

A Christian Science practitioner is an individual who prays for others according to the teachings of Christian Science. Treatment is non-medical, rather it is based on the Bible and the Christian Science textbook, Science and Health with Key to the Scriptures (1875) by Mary Baker Eddy (1821–1910), who said she discovered Christian Science in 1866 and founded the Christian Science church in 1879. According to the church, Christian Science practitioners address physical conditions, as well as relationship or financial difficulties and any other problem or crisis.

Practitioners are either "listed" or "unlisted," a designation that refers to a form of international accreditation maintained by The Mother Church, in Boston, Massachusetts. "Listed" practitioners are included in the directory of Christian Science practitioners on the church website, and printed in the Christian Science Journal.

== Practice and ethics ==
Christian Science practitioners are those who devote their full time to prayer for others. Regarding prayer in Christian Science, sometimes called "treatment" when focused on a specific issue or problem, Mary Baker Eddy wrote: "The prayer that reforms the sinner and heals the sick is an absolute faith that all things are possible to God, — a spiritual understanding of Him, an unselfed love." Christian Scientists see practitioners as following in the footsteps of Jesus' disciples in order to "reinstate primitive Christianity and its lost element of healing." The work of a Christian Science practitioner, according to John M. Tutt, a medical doctor who left medicine and became a Christian Science practitioner, is that of a "helper"; and the patient is encouraged to pray along with the practitioner to "know the truth" when possible. However, Christian Scientists note that the patient does not need to pray or even believe in Christian Science or have any religious faith at all in order to be healed by a practitioner's prayer. Practitioners are also not confined to praying about sickness, but pray for people regarding any type of difficulty such as financial or relationship problems.

Christian Scientists do not consider healing to be the primary purpose of Christian Science, but rather a deeper sense of God that they say comes with healing. However, Charles S. Braden notes that most Christian Scientists probably originally came to the religion for healing. Critics of Christian Science have ridiculed the idea of "absent treatment", where a practitioner prays for a patient who is not physically present with the practitioner, and sometimes compared it to witchcraft; but Christian Scientists counter that Jesus did the same thing, citing the healing of the centurion's servant in the Gospel of Matthew.

Practitioners are required to maintain the confidentiality of their patients' private communications. In cases where the patient's recovery is "chronic" or if the practitioner fails to bring about a recovery, he is required to lower the bill. Combining Christian Science treatment with medical treatment is not recommended by Science and Health and traditionally, practitioners have withdrawn from cases where the patient undertook medical treatment, except where it was clear this was against the patient's will. As noted by Robert Peel, Christian Scientists are "not 'against doctors'... [but] experience has shown that any attempt to combine Christian Science with medical treatment is likely to lessen the efficacy of each, since they start from exactly opposite premises." Some practitioners no longer give up such cases, although they may change the nature of their prayer, a loosening of standards precipitated by several well-publicized deaths under Christian Science treatment, including those of children.

== System of accreditation ==
Any student of Christian Science may take patients, but only those "listed" as practitioners in the worldwide directory published in The Christian Science Journal and on the Christian Science website are regarded by the church as experienced healers. The church writes that, to become listed, applicants are interviewed, and must provide references from "three patients who can confirm a complete healing through [the applicant's] prayerful treatment." Applicants must also have taken "primary class" instruction by an "authorized teacher of Christian Science" under the aegis of the Christian Science Board of Education, as stipulated in the Manual of The Mother Church, which governs all activities of the church.

== Class instruction and Christian Science teachers ==
=== Primary class instruction ===
Primary class is a two-week course that is open to anyone and is a "comprehensive study of the nature of God and man", according to DeWitt John, a Christian Science teacher. The class follows the chapter "Recapitulation" from Science and Health, using the Bible and all Eddy's published works as research and reference to explain the chapter. Following hours of class time, students are given hours of homework, both reading and written assignments. John writes, "The instruction is so deep and absorbing that it often changes one's outlook and leaves an impression that lasts a lifetime. ... [It] has special impact because of its systematic and thorough character and because it is based upon years of actual experience on the part of the teacher in the practice of Christian Science healing." Severin E. Simonsen, a Methodist minister converted to Christian Science, wrote, "I have sat for months in classrooms listening to learned professors and able teachers, but I never supposed it to be possible for any human being to teach and unfold to his students, in the short space of two weeks, all that [our teacher] imparted to us." Students completing the course receive the certificate "C.S." and are referred to as having been "class taught".

Teachers are prohibited from soliciting students; rather, students apply to a teacher for primary class, which is taken just once in life, except in the event that a teacher's credentials are withdrawn. Each teacher maintains an "association" of students, which grows in size over the years. Each teacher meets annually with the entire association for an all-day lecture designed to renew and further the students' understanding and practice of Christian Science.

=== Christian Science teachers (C.S.B.) ===
An authorized teacher is one who, having had primary class instruction and a minimum of three years' experience as a practitioner, has completed the normal course. Normal class instruction is held once every three years and is limited to 30 pupils. Primary class is held once a year by each teacher and is also limited to 30. According to the Manual, those who complete the normal class receive the certificate "C.S.B." Tuition for both classes is fixed by the Manual at $100.

Primary class instruction is held all over the world, wherever authorized teachers of Christian Science live or decide to teach; the normal class is held by the Christian Science Board of Education in Boston, Massachusetts. The Board selects a teacher, who usually teaches the normal class just once in a lifetime, and is not identified until several weeks after the class has ended.

== In the United States ==
In the United States, Christian Science practitioners are legally defined as health care providers. Despite the non-medical nature of their practice, Christian Science practitioners were aggressively prosecuted in the late 19th century by newly established state medical societies across the United States. Most state courts dismissed these actions because the courts ruled that they did not practice medicine.

Year	Practitioners	US Population	Practitioners per Million	Annual rate
1956	8,300	168,900,000	49	n/a
1971	4,965	207,660,000	24	▼4.7%
1976	4,302	218,040,000	20	▼3.8%
1979	3,878	225,060,000	17	▼4.4%
1986	3,700	240,130,000	15	▼1.6%
1991	2,237	252,980,000	8.8	▼10.5%
1996	1,802	269,390,000	6.7	▼5.4%
2005	1,161	295,520,000	3.9	▼5.7%
2016	942	322,940,000	2.9	▼2.7%
2022	706	333,330,000	2.1	▼5.2%

== Notable Christian Science practitioners ==
- Adam H. Dickey
- Annie M. Knott
- Bliss Knapp
- Calvin Frye
- Charles Murray
- DeWitt John
- Edmund F. Burton
- Frances Thurber Seal
- Irving C. Tomlinson
- Jer Master
- John M. Tutt
- Kay Kyser
- Laura Lathrop
- Mary Burt Messer
- Richard Bergenheim
- Roy Olmstead
- Septimus J. Hanna
- Sue Harper Mims
- Violet S. Hay
- Walton Hubbard
- William D. McCrackan
- William Higgs
- William Rathvon

== See also ==
- Efficacy of prayer
