= Robert Peel (historian) =

American historian and writer

- Born: May 6, 1909; London, England
- Died: January 8, 1992 (aged 82); Boston, Massachusetts
- Citizenship: American (1940)
- Education: BA, English literature, Harvard University, 1931; MA, English literature, Harvard University, 1940
- Occupation: Christian Science historian
- Employer(s): Principia College, Harvard University, The First Church of Christ, Scientist
- Notable work: Mary Baker Eddy trilogy

Robert Arthur Peel (May 6, 1909 – January 8, 1992) was an historian and writer on religious and ecumenical topics, especially The First Church of Christ, Scientist and Christian Science. As a Christian Scientist for over 70 years, Peel wrote editorials for the Christian Science Monitor, a publication owned by the Church of Christ, Scientist. He was also a counsellor for the church's Committee on Publication. Peel is best known for his three-volume biography, Mary Baker Eddy: The Years of Discovery (1966), Mary Baker Eddy: The Years of Trial (1971), and Mary Baker Eddy: The Years of Authority (1977).

== Early life and education ==
Born in London to Anne Susannah Monk, a Christian Scientist, and Arthur James Peel, Peel moved to Boston with his parents and sister, Doris (1907–1990), in or around 1921. He was educated at the Boston Latin School, and from 1927 studied English literature at Harvard University, graduating in 1931. His undergraduate honors thesis, The Creed of a Victorian Pagan, a study of English novelist and poet George Meredith, was published by the university that year. T. S. Eliot, who taught at Harvard, published Peel's undergraduate essay on Virginia Woolf in The Criterion, a British literary magazine. After graduating, Peel taught history and literature at Harvard and began his graduate studies. In 1935 he submitted a proposal for a doctorate on Mary Baker Eddy, but it was rejected. He was awarded a master's degree in 1940.

== Career ==
After several years teaching at Harvard, Peel taught English and philosophy at Principia College, a Christian Science college in Elsah, Illinois, returning to Harvard in 1940 for his master's, then resuming his teaching at Principia. During World War II, he served in the South Pacific as a counter-intelligence officer for the US Army. In 1945, he joined the staff of General Douglas MacArthur, who oversaw the occupation of Japan after the war; Peel taught Shigeko Higashikuni (Princess Teru), daughter of Emperor Hirohito, and her husband, Prince Morihiro Higashikuni.

After the war, Peel joined The Christian Science Monitor, a newspaper owned by the Christian Science church, writing editorials and book reviews, then in 1953 left the Monitor to work for The First Church of Christ, Scientist, the church's administration in Boston, where he became an advisor to the church's Committee on Publication. That year, he recorded a radio talk about Christian Science, "Moving Mountains", for the BBC Third Programme. First published in the Christian Science Monitor, it also appeared in the BBC magazine The Listener. In the article, he argued for the Christian Science view of humanity as "spiritual rather than material, incapable of corruption and error, no more subject to annihilation than his Maker".

His first book, Christian Science: Its Encounter with American Culture, was published in 1958. Theologian Cornelius J. Dyck described Peel's approach as "partisan but gentle, the intention is apologetic but without either alienating the reader or making a wild-eyed convert out of him". The book examines the broader cultural context of Eddy, especially in comparison to Amos Bronson Alcott, who Peel believed was somewhat of an anomaly in the post-Civil War period. Peel also exaimines the role of Science and Health with Key to the Scriptures in Christian Science theology. His extensive research into the life of Mary Baker Eddy, founder of the Christian Science church, culminated in his biographical trilogy, Mary Baker Eddy: The Years of Discovery (1966), Mary Baker Eddy: The Years of Trial (1971), and Mary Baker Eddy: The Years of Authority (1977), first published by Holt, Rinehart and Winston, then by the Christian Science Publishing Society. Peel was a Christian Scientist all his adult life, although he was said to have become estranged from the church in later years.

== Reception ==
Reviewing Mary Baker Eddy: The Years of Discovery, Charles S. Braden wrote in 1967: "Despite the impressive apparatus of scholarship employed, Mr. Peel's book must be taken for what it really is, an exceedingly clever piece of propaganda in support of the official view of the life of Mrs. Eddy. As such it is probably the most effective that has yet appeared." According to historian James Findlay, Peel was "highly sympathetic" to Eddy; the result was a "flat, one or two-dimensional image that remains unreal". Despite this, Findlay viewed The Years of Discovery as a "substantial addition to the literature on American religious history".

In The New York Times Book Review in 1978, Martin E. Marty wrote that Peel's work had "begun to break the barriers between apologists and critics". Raymond J. Cunningham, a history professor, described Peel the following year as a "painstaking and imaginative scholar" and the final book of Peel's trilogy a more balanced picture of Eddy, but noted his "uncomfortably reverential" approach and special pleading to resolve "doubtful points in favor of the subject". Cunningham concluded nevertheless that the work was an important achievement. Biographer Carol Dickson noted that "Peel seeks to ignore controversies completely by confining discussions of conflicting evidence and questions of reliability to his notes."

In her own biography of Mary Baker Eddy in 1998, Gillian Gill called Peel "Mrs. Eddy's most brilliant, informed, and judicious biographer." "Throughout the biography his love, sympathy, and reverence for his subject shine through," she wrote. "But Peel was also dedicated to historical truth and serious scholarship, and his text is supplemented by references, quotations, and copious notes which form a treasure trove for scholars." Another benefit of the work, she added, was that it supplied archival numbers for material scholars had not known existed. Caroline Fraser wrote in 1999 that Peel was "an apologist for Eddy's more eccentric characteristics." In 2003, William E. Phipps, a professor of religion and philosophy, also described him as an "Eddy apologist". Daniel Burt wrote: "By far the most comprehensive and authoritative treatment of Eddy’s life, Peel, with access to the Christian Science archives and the unpublished collection of Eddy’s letters, documents Eddy’s daily life fully and views her development in the context of her time. The author, a Christian Scientist, mostly achieves an objectivity that is neither excessively partisan nor debunking."

== Selected works ==
- (1958). Christian Science: Its Encounter with American Culture. New York: Henry Holt and Company. ISBN 0-933062-24-9
- (1966). Mary Baker Eddy: The Years of Discovery. New York: Holt, Rinehart and Winston. OCLC 1116927989
  - Reprint: (1982). Boston: Christian Science Publishing Society. OCLC 552284284
- (1971). Mary Baker Eddy: The Years of Trial. New York: Holt, Rinehart and Winston. ISBN 978-0-03-086700-2 OCLC 192276
  - Reprint: (1971). Boston: Christian Science Publishing Society. OCLC 955157802
- (1977). Mary Baker Eddy: The Years of Authority. New York: Holt, Rinehart and Winston. ISBN 978-0-03-021081-5 OCLC 1021289627
  - Reprint: (1982). Boston: Christian Science Publishing Society. ISBN 978-0-87510142-2 OCLC 221406358
- (1987). Spiritual Healing in a Scientific Age. San Francisco: Harper and Row. ISBN 0-06-066484-3
- (1988). Health and Medicine in the Christian Science Tradition. New York: Crossroad. ISBN 0-8245-0895-5
