= Christian Science Sentinel =

Christian Science magazine

- Categories: Christian
- Frequency: Weekly
- Format: Print, radio, and online
- Publisher: Christian Science Publishing Society
- Founder: Mary Baker Eddy
- First issue: September 1, 1898; 127 years ago
- Website: sentinel.christianscience.com

The Christian Science Sentinel (originally the Christian Science Weekly) is a magazine published by the Christian Science Publishing Society based in Boston, Massachusetts. The magazine was launched by Mary Baker Eddy in 1898. It includes articles, editorials, and accounts of healings from a Christian Science point of view.

The Christian Science Sentinel Radio Edition was a weekly radio program broadcast around the world and released monthly on CD and cassette tape. It dealt with the same issues as the magazine, via interviews and discussions. It was replaced with Sentinel Watch, a weekly podcast airing since 2016 on the website JSH-Online.

The Sentinel, along with the monthly Christian Science Journal, is a primary source for information about the church and its members. A sister publication, The Herald of Christian Science, exists in a number of foreign languages. Back issues of these magazines are made available at Christian Science Reading Rooms and also at some university and public libraries.
