= The Christian Science Journal =

Christian Science magazine

- Categories: Christian
- Frequency: Monthly
- Format: Print, online
- Publisher: Christian Science Publishing Society
- Founder: Mary Baker Eddy
- First issue: April 14, 1883; 143 years ago
- Website: jsh.christianscience.com

The Christian Science Journal is an official monthly publication of the Church of Christ, Scientist through the Christian Science Publishing Society, founded in 1883 by Mary Baker Eddy. The first edition appeared on April 14, 1883, bearing the subtitle, "An Independent Family Paper to Promote Health and Morals". At that time, Eddy was the editor and main contributor to the Journal. The magazine is based in Boston.

The Journal is designed to demonstrate the practical applications of Christian Science healing practice. Instructive articles and verified reports of Christian healing give the reader a working understanding of the Principle and practice of Christian Science. Each issue also contains editorials, interviews, church news, poems, as well as a worldwide directory of Christian Science practitioners, teachers, churches, Reading Rooms, organizations at universities and colleges, and more. Two sister publications exist: the Christian Science Sentinel, a weekly magazine; and The Herald of Christian Science, which is published in a number of foreign languages.

== Notable editors and contributors ==
=== Editors ===
- Septimus J. Hanna
- Emma Curtis Hopkins
- Annie M. Knott
- William D. McCrackan

=== Contributors ===
- Neil Kensington Adam
- Alice Stone Blackwell
- Charles Lightoller
- Marietta T. Webb
