= History of the Christian Science movement =

The Christian Science movement is a religious movement within Christianity founded by Mary Baker Eddy that arose in the mid to late 19th century and that led to the founding of The First Church of Christ, Scientist.

== 1866-1910 ==
=== Mary Baker Eddy ===
Born Mary Morse Baker on a farm in Bow, New Hampshire, Eddy was the youngest of six children in a family of Protestant Congregationalists. Her father, Mark Baker, was a deeply religious man, although, according to one account, "Christianity to him was warfare against sin, not a religion of human brotherhood." (Note: Eddy, Retrospection and Introspection, 1891: "My father's relentless theology emphasized belief in a final judgment-day, in the danger of endless punishment, and in a Jehovah merciless towards unbelievers ...") In common with most women at the time Eddy was given little formal education, but she said she had read widely at home. (Note: Eddy, Retrospection and Introspection, 1891: "My father was taught to believe that my brain was too large for my body and so kept me much out of school, but I gained book-knowledge with far less labor than is usually requisite. At ten years of age I was as familiar with Lindley Murray's Grammar as with the Westminster Catechism; and the latter I had to repeat every Sunday. My favorite studies were natural philosophy, logic, and moral science. From my brother Albert I received lessons in the ancient tongues, Hebrew, Greek, and Latin. My brother studied Hebrew during his college vacations. After my discovery of Christian Science, most of the knowledge I had gleaned from schoolbooks vanished like a dream." Ernest Sutherland Bates and John V. Dittemore, 1932: Eddy was not able to attend Sanbornton (Tilton) Academy when the family moved there in 1836, but was required instead to start at the district school on the lower floor of the same building. She started at the beginning with the youngest girls, but withdrew after a month because of poor health. Thereafter she received private tuition from the Reverend Enoch Corser. She entered Sanbornton Academy in 1842. According to Robert Peel, Eddy "may have attended Holmes Academy at Plymouth in 1838 and certainly attended Sanbornton Academy in 1842." She may have attended during other terms, and may also have attended another school called Woodman Sanbornton Academy. Gillian Gill, 1998: "In November 1842, at age twenty-one, she completed her formal schooling, having done three full semesters at the Sanbornton Academy under Dyer Sanborn.") From childhood she lived with protracted ill health, complaining of chronic indigestion and spinal inflammation, and according to biographers experiencing fainting spells. (Note: Robert Peel, 1966: "This was when life took on the look of a nightmare, overburdened nerves gave way, and she would end in a state of unconsciousness that would sometimes last for hours and send the family into a panic. On such an occasion Lyman Durgin, the Baker's teen-age chore boy, who adored Mary, would be packed off on a horse for the village doctor ...") The literary critic Harold Bloom described her as "a kind of anthology of nineteenth-century nervous ailments".

Eddy's first husband died just before her 23rd birthday, six months after they married and three months before their son was born, leaving her penniless; as a result of her poor health she lost custody of the boy when he was four. Her second husband left her after 13 years of marriage; Eddy said that he had promised to become her child's legal guardian, but it is unclear whether he did, and Eddy lost contact with her son until he was in his thirties. (Note: Eddy, Retrospection and Introspection, 1891: "After returning to the paternal roof I lost all my husband's property, except what money I had brought with me; and remained with my parents until after my mother's decease. "A few months before my father's second marriage, to Mrs. Elizabeth Patterson Duncan, sister of Lieutenant-Governor George W. Patterson of New York, my little son, about four years of age, was sent away from me, and put under the care of our family nurse, who had married, and resided in the northern part of New Hampshire. I had no training for self-support, and my home I regarded as very precious. The night before my child was taken from me, I knelt by his side throughout the dark hours, hoping for a vision of relief from this trial. ... "My second marriage was very unfortunate, and from it I was compelled to ask for a bill of divorce, which was granted me in the city of Salem, Massachusetts. "My dominant thought in marrying again was to get back my child, but after our marriage his stepfather was not willing he should have a home with me. A plot was consummated for keeping us apart. The family to whose care he was committed very soon removed to what was then regarded as the Far West. "After his removal a letter was read to my little son, informing him that his mother was dead and buried. Without my knowledge a guardian was appointed him, and I was then informed that my son was lost. Every means within my power was employed to find him, but without success. We never met again until he had reached the age of thirty-four, had a wife and two children, and by a strange providence had learned that his mother still lived, and came to see me in Massachusetts.") (Per the legal doctrine of coverture, women in the United States could not then be their own children's guardians.) (Note: Harvard Business School, 2010: "A married woman or feme covert was a dependent, like an underage child or a slave, and could not own property in her own name or control her own earnings, except under very specific circumstances. When a husband died, his wife could not be the guardian to their under-age children.") Her third husband, Asa Gilbert Eddy, died five years after they married; she believed he had been killed by malicious animal magnetism. Six years later, when she was 67 and apparently in need of loyalty and affection, she legally adopted a 41-year-old homeopath as her second son.

Eddy was by all accounts charismatic and able to inspire great loyalty, although Gillian Gill writes that she could also be irrational and unkind. (Note: Gillian Gill, 1998: "Any account of the rise of Christian Science falls short of the mark if it fails to see and acknowledge that Mary Baker Eddy had charisma." "She could be bad-tempered, irrational, capricious, inconsiderate, domineering, sanctimonious, unkind.") According to Bryan Wilson, she exemplified the female charismatic leader, and was viewed as the head of the Christian Science church even after her death; he wrote in 1961 that her name—Christian Scientists call her Mrs. Eddy or "our beloved Leader"—was still included in all articles published in the Christian Science journals.

She wore an imported black satin dress heavily beaded with tiny black jet beads, black satin slippers, beaded, and had on her rarely beautiful diamonds. ... She stood before us, seemingly slight, graceful of carriage, and exquisitely beautiful even to critical eyes. Then, still standing, she faced her class as one who knew herself to be a teacher by divine right. She turned to the student at the end of the first row of seats and took direct mental cognizance of this one, plainly knocked at the door of this individual consciousness. ... This continued until each member of the class had received the same mental cognizance. No audible word voiced the purely mental contact.

— C. Lulu Blackman (student of Eddy's), 1885

It was in part because of her unusual personality that Christian Science flourished, despite the numerous disputes she initiated among her followers. "She was like a patch of colour in those gray communities," McClure's wrote, "She never laid aside her regal air; never entered a room or left it like other people." Mark Twain, a prominent critic of hers, described her in 1907 as "vain, untruthful [and] jealous", but "[i]n several ways ... the most interesting woman that ever lived, and the most extraordinary".

=== Phineas Parkhurst Quimby ===
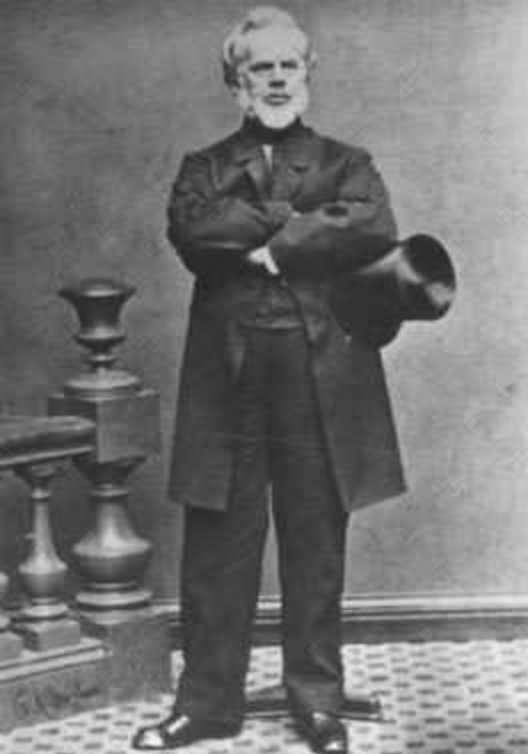
Phineas Parkhurst Quimby, c. 1860

Eddy tried every remedy for her ill health, including a three-month stay at the Vail's Hydropathic Institute in Hill, New Hampshire. (Note: Julius Dresser, October 17, 1962: "The most peculiar person I have seen of late is Mrs. Patterson, the authoress, who came last Friday, a week ago today, from Vail's Water Cure in Hill, N. H., where Melville, Fanny Bass, and I were; and is now under Dr. Quimby, and boarding also, at Mrs. Hunter's. She was only able to get here, and no one else thought she could live to travel so far, but today she, with Mrs. Hunter and sister, Nettie [Annetta Seabury, later Julius Dresser's wife] and I went up into the dome of the 'New City Building' up seven flights of stairs, or 182 steps. So much for Dr. Quimby's doings.") She told the Boston Post in 1883 that, for the seven years prior to 1862 (most of her second marriage), she had been effectively confined to her bed or room.

In 1861 Eddy heard of a healing method developed by Phineas Parkhurst Quimby, a former clockmaker in Portland, Maine. Self-styled Dr. P. P. Quimby, a practitioner of the "Science of Health," had become interested in healing after recovering suddenly from a condition he believed was consumption (tuberculosis). After attending a lecture in Maine in 1837 by the French mesmerist Charles Poyen, Quimby began to practice mesmerism himself. Mesmerism was named after Franz Mesmer (1734–1815), a German physician who argued for the existence of a fluid through which bodies could influence each other, a force he called animal magnetism. Quimby and an assistant, Lucius Burkmar, traveled around Maine and New Brunswick giving demonstrations; Burkmar, in a trance, would offer mind readings and suggestions for cures.

Quimby abandoned mesmerism around 1847 when he realized that it was suggestion that was effecting the apparent cures. He came to the view that disease was a mental state. When Jesus healed a paralysed arm, he had known, Quimby wrote, "that the arm was not the cause but the effect, and he addressed Himself to the intelligence, and applied His wisdom to the cause". In so doing Jesus had relied upon Christ, a synonym for Truth, Science and God, a power that Quimby believed all human beings could access. Quimby referred to this idea, in February 1863, as "Christian science," a phrase he used only once in writing. (Note: Phineas Parkhurst Quimby: "The leaders of the medical schools, through the hypocrisy of their profession, deceive the people into submission to their opinions, while democracy forges the fetters which are to bind them to disease. Science, which would destroy this bondage, is looked upon as blasphemy when it dares oppose the faculty, and religion has no place in medical science. So in the church the religion of Jesus' Science is never heard; for it would drive aristocracy out of the pulpit, and scatter seeds of freedom among the people. Nevertheless, the religion of Christ is shown in the progress of Christian Science, while the religion of society decays as the liberal principles are developed. Man's religion labors to keep Science down in all churches North and South, by suppressing free discussion, for aristocracy will not have anything tending to freedom.") He wrote:

The basis of Dr. Quimby's theory is that there is no intelligence, no power or action in matter of itself, that the spiritual world to which our eyes are closed by ignorance or unbelief is the real world, that in it lie all the causes for every effect visible in the natural world, and that if this spiritual life can be revealed to us, in other words if we can understand ourselves, we shall then have our happiness or misery in our own hands ..." (Note: Quimby 1921, p. 319–320; Robert C. Fuller, Mesmerism and the American Cure of Souls, Philadelphia: University of Pennsylvania Press, 1982, p. 134. Stewart W. Holmes wrote in 1944 that this passage was probably the source of Eddy's "scientific statement of being" in the "Recapitulation" chapter of Science and Health (p. 468): "There is no life, truth, intelligence, nor substance in matter. All is infinite Mind and its infinite manifestation, for God is All-in-all. Spirit is immortal Truth; matter is mortal error. Spirit is the real and eternal; matter is the unreal and temporal. Spirit is God, and man is His image and likeness. Therefore man is not material; he is spiritual.")

By 1856, Quimby had 500 patients a year. He would sit next to them and explain that the disease was something their minds could control; sometimes he would wet his hands and rub their heads, but it was the talking that helped them, he said, not the manipulation. (Note: Quimby described his methods in a "circular to the sick": "Dr. P. P. Quimby would respectfully announce to the citizens of _______ and vicinity, that he will be at the _______, where he will attend to those wishing to consult him in regard to their health. And as his practice is unlike all other medical practice, it is necessary to say that he gives no medicines and makes no outward applications, but simply sits down by the patients, tells them their feelings and what they think is their disease. If the patients admit that he tells them their feelings, etc., then his explanation is the cure; and if he succeeds in correcting their error, he changes the fluids of the system and establishes the truth or health.") Quimby began to write his thoughts down around 1859—his work was published posthumously as The Quimby Manuscripts in 1921—and was generous in allowing his patients to copy one of his essays, "Questions and Answers." This became an issue, from 1883 onwards, when Eddy was accused of having based Christian Science on his work. (Note: Bryan Wilson, 1961: "The consensus of opinion of those who have written on Christian Science is that the most significant part of [Eddy's] search for knowledge was [her] association with Phineas P. Quimby, a talented New England healer, who, posthumously, was to become the accepted prophet of the New Thought movement.")

=== Eddy as Quimby's patient ===
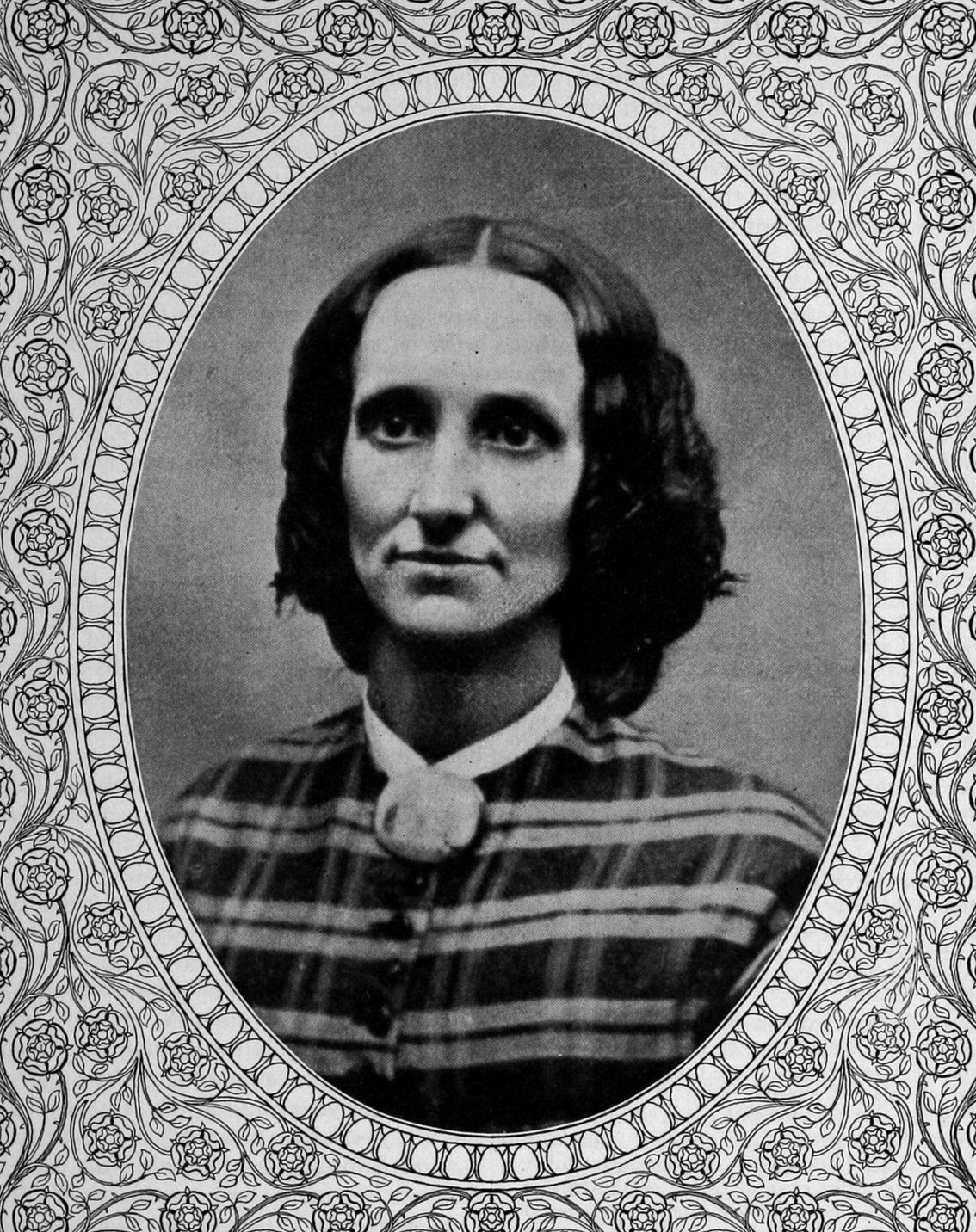
Mary Baker Eddy, c. 1864

When Eddy first met Quimby in Portland in October 1862, she had to be helped up the stairs to his consulting rooms. She spoke highly of him the following month in a letter to the Portland Evening Courier: "This truth which he opposes to the error of giving intelligence to matter and placing pain where it never placed itself ... changes the currents of the system to their normal action ..." (Note: Eddy, November 7, 1862: "But now I can see dimly at first and only as trees walking, the great principle which underlies Dr. Quimby's faith and works; and just in proportion to my right perception of truth, is my recovery. This truth which he opposes to the error of giving intelligence to matter and placing pain where it never placed itself, if received understandingly changes the currents of the system to their normal action and the mechanism of the body goes on undisturbed. That this is a science capable of demonstration becomes clear to the minds of those patients who reason upon the process of their cure. The truth which he establishes in the patient cures him (although he may be wholly unconscious thereof) and the body which is full of light, is no longer in disease.") In a second letter she offered to supply quotations from Quimby's "theory of Christ (not Jesus)." Between then and May 1864, Eddy returned to see Quimby several times, staying for weeks in Portland and visiting him daily. She wrote to him regularly, and composed a sonnet for him, "Mid light of science sits the sage profound."

Eddy first used mental healing on a patient in March 1864, when one of Quimby's patients in Portland, Mary Ann Jarvis, suffered a relapse when she returned home to Warren, Maine. Eddy stayed with her for two months, giving Jarvis mental healing to ease a breathing problem, and writing to Quimby six times for absent treatment for herself. She called the latter "angel visits"; in one of her letters to Quimby, she said that she had seen him in her room. In April she gave a public lecture in Warren, contrasting mental healing with Spiritualism, entitled: "P. P. Quimby's Spiritual Science healing disease, as opposed to Deism or Rochester Rapping Spiritualism."

=== Fall in Lynn ===
Mrs. Mary Patterson, of Swampscott, fell upon the ice near the corner of Market and Oxford streets, on Thursday evening, and was severely injured. She was taken up in an insensible condition and carried into the residence of S. M. Bubier, Esq., near by, where she was kindly cared for during the night. Dr. Cushing, who was called, found her injuries to be internal, and of a severe nature, inducing spasms and internal suffering. She was removed to her home in Swampscott yesterday afternoon, though in a very critical condition.

— Lynn Reporter, February 3, 1866
First public report of Eddy's fall on the ice.

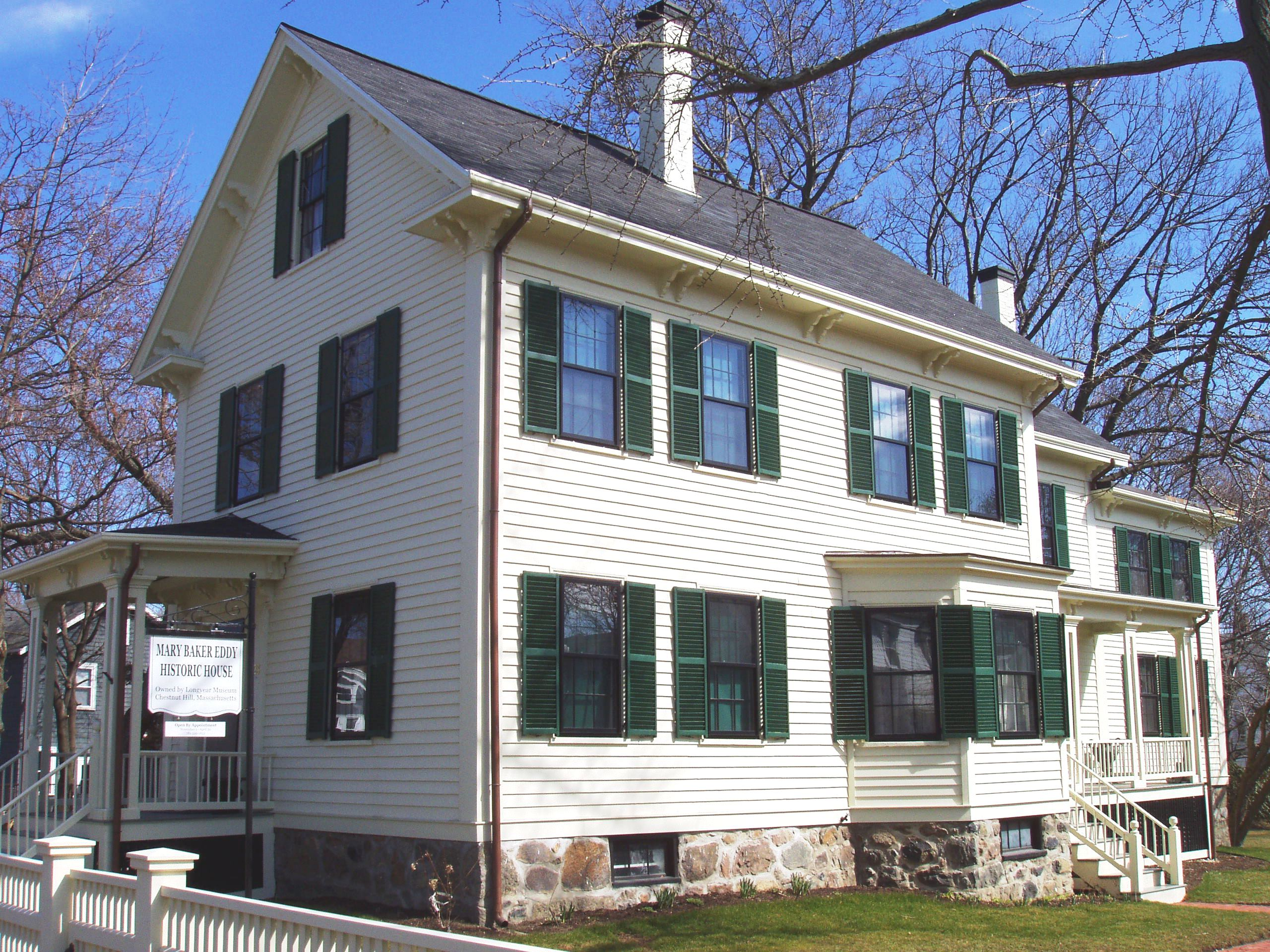
Eddy and her husband were living on the second floor of this house at 23 Paradise Road, Swampscott, Massachusetts, a suburb in the eastern part of Lynn, when Eddy fell on the ice.

On Thursday, February 1, 1866, Mary Baker Eddy, then known as Mary Patterson, fell on the ice in Lynn, Massachusetts. She had been on the way to a Good Templars meeting, an organization supporting the temperance movement, with friends from the organization. After her fall, the Lynn Reporter wrote that she was "in an insensible condition" and had internal injuries, and the notes of Dr. Alvin M. Cushing, a homeopathic doctor, who was called to the scene, state that he found Eddy "partially unconscious, semi-hysterical and complaining by word and action of severe pain in the back of her head and neck." She was taken to the nearest house, that of Samuel M. Bubier the future mayor of Lynn, and spent the night there. Cushing attended to her multiple times that day and during the night, which Gill writes "indicates that he considered the accident serious," and he gave orders that homeopathic medicine be continually given her at intervals of every half hour when she was awake while he was not present. Cushing later told Sibyl Wilbur that Eddy "was taken up unconscious and remained unconscious during the night" and that he thought she was "suffering from a concussion, and possible spinal dislocation."

The next morning Eddy asked to be taken to her home in Swampscott, which Cushing arranged for against his own professional advice. In order to dull the pain of moving, Cushing gave Eddy "one-eighth of a grain of morphine" (a common painkiller at the time) according to his notes from the period. Cushing also stated that Eddy was "a very interesting patient" who was "one of the most sensitive to the effects" of the morphine that he ever saw, and that to his surprise, the dose put her "sound asleep." (Note: Gill wrote that Milmine, one of the most well known critics of Eddy, may have inadvertently proved wrong the common claim among critics that Eddy was a life-long morphine addict by publishing Cushing's account, for a real morphine addict would have barely been affected by such a small dose.) Her husband Daniel Patterson was out of town at the time, but she was attended to by friends, Carrie Millett and Mary Wheeler, who took turns watching by her bedside. They told neighbors that Eddy had broken her back, was paralyzed, and possibly close to death; and at some point a call was made for a minister to come. After that Friday, Eddy apparently refused to take any more of his medicine, having lost her faith in homeopathy.

On Sunday, February 4, she sent everyone out of the room and, according to her own account, she opened her Bible and read. (Note: Although it is commonly cited that she opened to Matthew 9:2–8, a passage about Jesus healing the paralytic at Capernaum, she had trouble in later years remembering the exact passage it was, and in early editions of Science and Health she identified it as a healing in Mark 3.) She later wrote: "As I read, the healing Truth dawned upon my sense; and the result was that I rose, dressed myself, and ever after was in better health than I had before enjoyed." By eyewitness affidavit accounts, she then got out of bed, got dressed, and walked downstairs to the parlor to meet with her surprised and concerned friends who were gathered there with the minister. Eddy called this "the falling apple that led [her] to the discovery" of Christian Science, but she said that she did not understand it at first, and that she spent three years afterwards studying the Bible in order to understand better how she had been healed.

Although Cushing had not visited Eddy on that Sunday, on Monday Cushing visited her again to check up. According to his notes, Cushing visited her next about a week later on February 13, at which point the bill was paid and he declared that she was in a "normal condition." The next day she sent a letter to Julius Dresser, a fellow student of Quimby and future critic of Eddy, telling him that she had fallen on the sidewalk, was "taken up for dead, came to consciousness... but to find [herself] the helpless cripple [she] was before [she] saw Dr. Quimby." She further stated that despite the physician's predictions, she had gotten out of bed and walked by herself; but now she was frightened and wanted Dresser's help. On March 2, Dresser sent a letter declining her request, suggesting she could do more for herself than he could, and refusing to step into Quimby's shoes as a healer. Eddy's letter was later used by Milmine to accuse Eddy of basically making up the whole thing, saying that in asking Dresser for help, it showed she had not fully recovered. Huge Studdert Kennedy writes that her asking for help may have been occasioned by her fear of previous experiences with relapses from physical difficulties, particularly under Quimby's treatment.

Milmine's critical McClure's biography also claimed that she wasn't really injured much or at all to begin with; in 1908 they solicited an affidavit from Cushing in which he stated he never took Eddy's injury to be serious, and never heard anything about a miraculous cure. He also stated that it was he, and not God, that cured her. Nenneman notes that Cushing was "not disposed to be friendly toward the progress Christian Science was making" at the time, and it may have "tampered his recollections." (Note: According to Robert Peel, Cushing wrote to Milmine saying "You are certainly showing the old lady up all right... My sons and others are very much stirred up that my name should appear in such a sacrilegious affair as Christian Science.") Gill wrote that the church countered the Cushing affidavit by collecting affidavits from various Lynn and Swampscott neighbors, and that according to these affidavits "everyone at the time had been convinced that [Eddy] had done great damage to her spine, and those familiar with her injuries regarded her sudden ability to rise from bed and walk out of the sick room as next to miraculous."

Christian Scientists have often seen the event as leading to a divine revelation and healing which changed Eddy's life; a life which before the fall was preparatory, a time of learning, for her work after; while critics see the event as basically meaningless and only used by Eddy to claim divine inspiration. Psychoanalyst Julius Silberger argues the truth is probably somewhere in-between, and that it clearly did have some effect on her, since her life and actions were "startlingly different" before and after the event. Gillian Gill wrote:

Whatever moral and religious interpretation one places upon it, the fall in Lynn clearly marked a turning point in [Eddy's] life, the moment when she began to take charge of her life... She herself consistently, and with increasing fervor and conviction, attributed that change to a new understanding of God's relation to the world, and to a new sense of her own special divine mission. Whether we label this delusion or revelation, the fact remains that the woman was fundamentally empowered, and that there was no external, material change to account for that increase of power.

=== Teaching Sally Wentworth ===
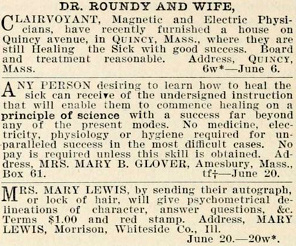
Eddy's ad (second ad, as Mary B. Glover), Banner of Light, July 4, 1868

In March 1866, a month after the fall, Eddy and her husband (then married for 13 years) moved into an unfurnished room in Lynn. At some point her husband left and Eddy was evicted, unable to pay the $1.50 weekly rent. He appears to have returned briefly—they moved to a boarding house in July, and in August he paid Dr. Cushing's bill from the fall—but the marriage was over. He sent her $200 a year for a time, and they divorced in 1873.

Her first student was Hiram Crafts, a shoe worker in whose house she stayed, who advertised for patients himself in May 1867, offering a cure for "Consumption, Catarrh, Scrofula, Dyspepsia and Rheumatism." Eddy asked Crafts to set up a practice with her, but the plan came to nothing. In addition to teaching, Eddy had started to write; toward the end of 1866 she began work on an allegorical interpretation of Genesis, intended as the first volume of a book (never published), The Bible in its Spiritual Meaning.

In the summer of 1868, while lodging with spiritualist Sarah Bagley in Amesbury, Eddy advertised for students in a Spiritualist magazine, the Banner of Light, as Mary B. Glover (her first husband's surname). The ad promised a "principle of science" that would heal with "[n]o medicine, electricity, physiology or hygiene required for unparalleled success in the most difficult cases". Sally Wentworth, another Spiritualist, offered Eddy $300-worth of bed and board in Stoughton if Eddy would treat her daughter's lung condition and teach Wentworth the healing method. Eddy stayed there for two years, from 1868 to 1870, teaching Wentworth with Quimby's unpublished essay, "Questions and Answers." She acknowledged that the manuscript was Quimby's, and spoke often of how she had promised to teach his healing method, which at the time she called Moral Science. (Note: Those who met Eddy at the Wentworths recalled her saying: "I learned this from Dr. Quimby, and he made me promise to teach it to at least two persons before I die".)

=== Moral Science practice in Lynn ===
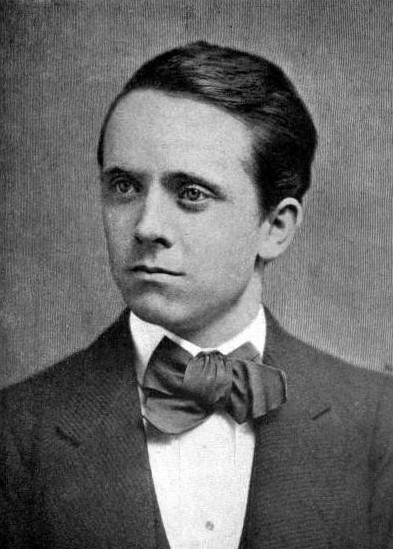
Richard Kennedy in 1871

Eddy was asked to leave the Wentworths' in early 1870. They fell out over several issues, including her request that they pay a printer $600 to publish her Genesis manuscript, which apparently ran to over 100,000 words. After returning to Amesbury to stay with Sally Bagley, she resumed contact with Richard Kennedy, who had been a fellow lodger two years earlier when he was working in a box factory, and had become one of her earliest students; he was 21 and Eddy 49. She now asked him to join her in opening a Moral Science practice in Lynn; he would see patients and she would teach. In June 1870, after agreeing to pay Eddy $1,000 for the previous two years' tuition, Kennedy rented rooms in Lynn and placed a sign in the yard, "Dr. Kennedy". The practice became popular. McClure's wrote that people would say: "Go to Dr. Kennedy. He can't hurt you, even if he doesn't help you."

Mrs. Glover, the well-known Scientist, will receive applications for one week from ladies and gentlemen who wish to learn how to heal the sick without medicine, and with a success unequaled by any known method of the present day, at Dr. Kennedy's office, No. 71 South Common Street, Lynn, Mass.

— Lynn Semi-Weekly Reporter, August 13, 1870.

Lynn was a center of the shoe industry and most of Eddy's students were factory workers or artisans. She charged $100, raised a few weeks later to $300, for a three-week course of 12 lessons (reduced in 1888 to seven). Eddy based the lessons on a revised version of Quimby's "Questions and Answers" manuscript—now called "The Science of Man, by which the sick are healed, Embracing Questions and Answers in Moral Science"—and on three shorter manuscripts, "The Soul's Inquiry of Man", "Spiritualism", and "Individuality", which she had written for her classes. "Questions and Answers" began: "What is God?" The answer: "Principle, wisdom, love, and truth." Two books on mental healing appeared around that time that may have influenced Eddy's thinking: The Mental Cure (1869) and Mental Medicine (1872), both by Warren Felt Evans, another former patient of Quimby's.

Eddy allowed her students to make copies of the manuscripts, but they were forbidden, under a $3,000 bond, from showing them to anyone. The students agreed to pay Eddy 10 percent annually of income derived from her work, and $1,000 if they failed to practice or teach it. She at first taught them to rub patients' heads, to "lay [their] hands where the belief is to rub it out forever"; Kennedy would manipulate each student's head and solar plexus before class in preparation. The head rubbing was abandoned when the women complained about having to take their hair down, and the stomach rubbing held no appeal for them either. Eventually Eddy told them to ignore that part of the manuscript, and from then on Christian Science healing did not involve touching patients. In 1879 Eddy sued two of the students (unsuccessfully) for royalties from their practices. They testified that she had claimed she no longer needed to eat and had seen the dead raised. Eddy told the judge she meant she had "seen the dead in understanding raised".

=== Mary B. Glover's Christian Scientists' Home ===
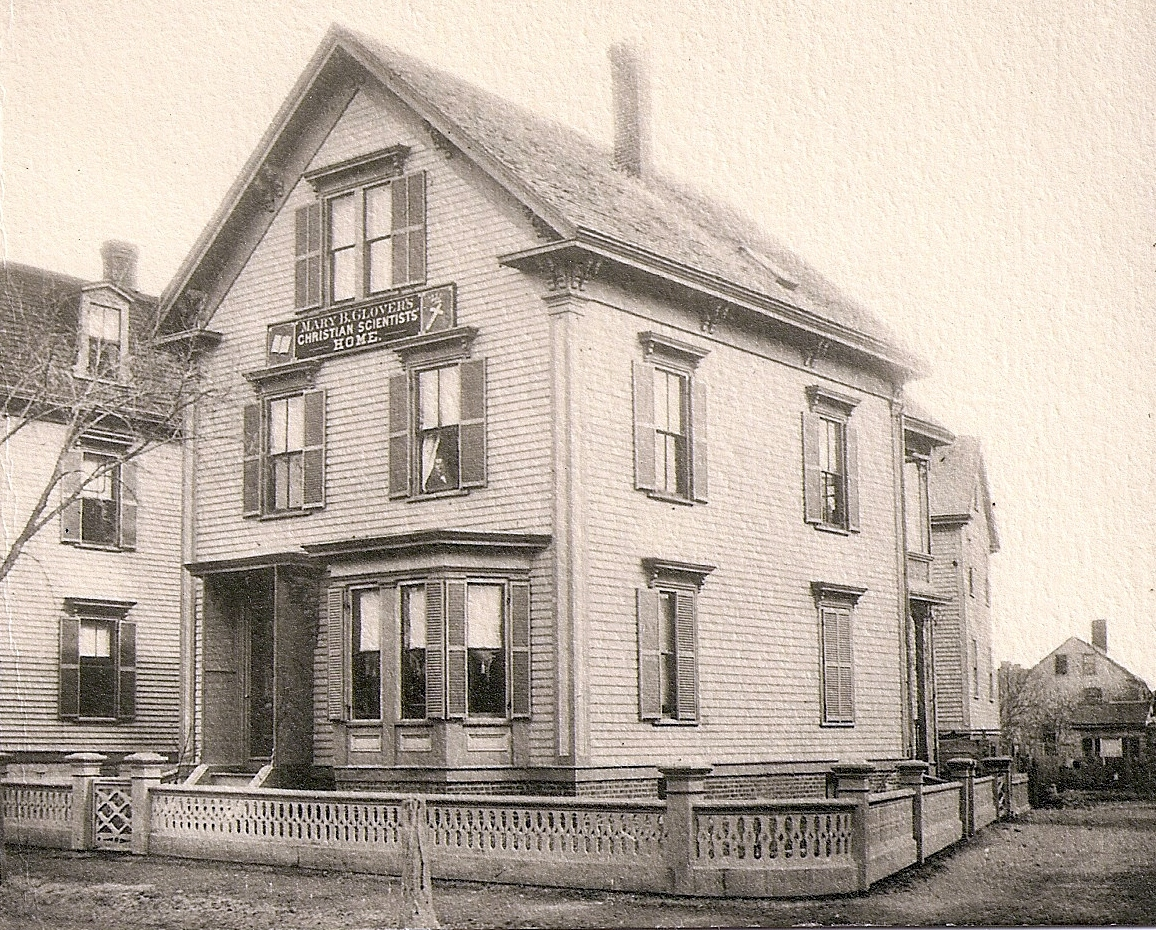
8 Broad Street, Lynn, Massachusetts, around 1880, with the sign "Mary B. Glover's Christian Scientists' Home."

Kennedy decided toward the end of 1871 to end his business partnership with Eddy. She had accused him in front of others of cheating at cards; it was one of several scenes she had caused between them and he walked out on her. There was a temporary reconciliation, but he was unhappy about the abandonment of head rubbing, and after a dispute between Eddy and a student over a refund was played out in the local press, he decided to go his own way.

Once Kennedy and Eddy had settled their financial affairs in May 1872, she was left with $6,000. Peel writes that at this point she had already written 60 pages of Science and Health. She was renting rooms in Lynn at 9 Broad Street, when 8 Broad Street came on the market. In March 1875 she purchased it for $5,650, taking in students to pay the mortgage. It was in the attic room of this house that she completed Science and Health.

Shortly after moving in, Eddy became close to another student, Daniel Spofford. He was 33 years old and married when he joined her class; he later left his wife in the hope that he might marry Eddy, but his feelings were not reciprocated. Spofford and seven other students agreed to form an association that would pay Eddy a certain amount a week if she would preach to them every Sunday. They called themselves the Christian Scientists' Association.

Eddy placed a sign on 8 Broad Street: "Mary B. Glover's Christian Scientists' Home." According to McClure's, there was a regular turnover of tenants and domestic staff, whom Eddy accused of stealing from the house; she blamed Richard Kennedy for using mesmerism to turn people against her. According to Peel, there was gossip about the attractive woman, the men who came and went, and whether she was engaged in witchcraft. She was hurt, he wrote, but made light of it: "Of course I believe in free love; I love everyone."

=== Science and Health ===
==== Publication ====
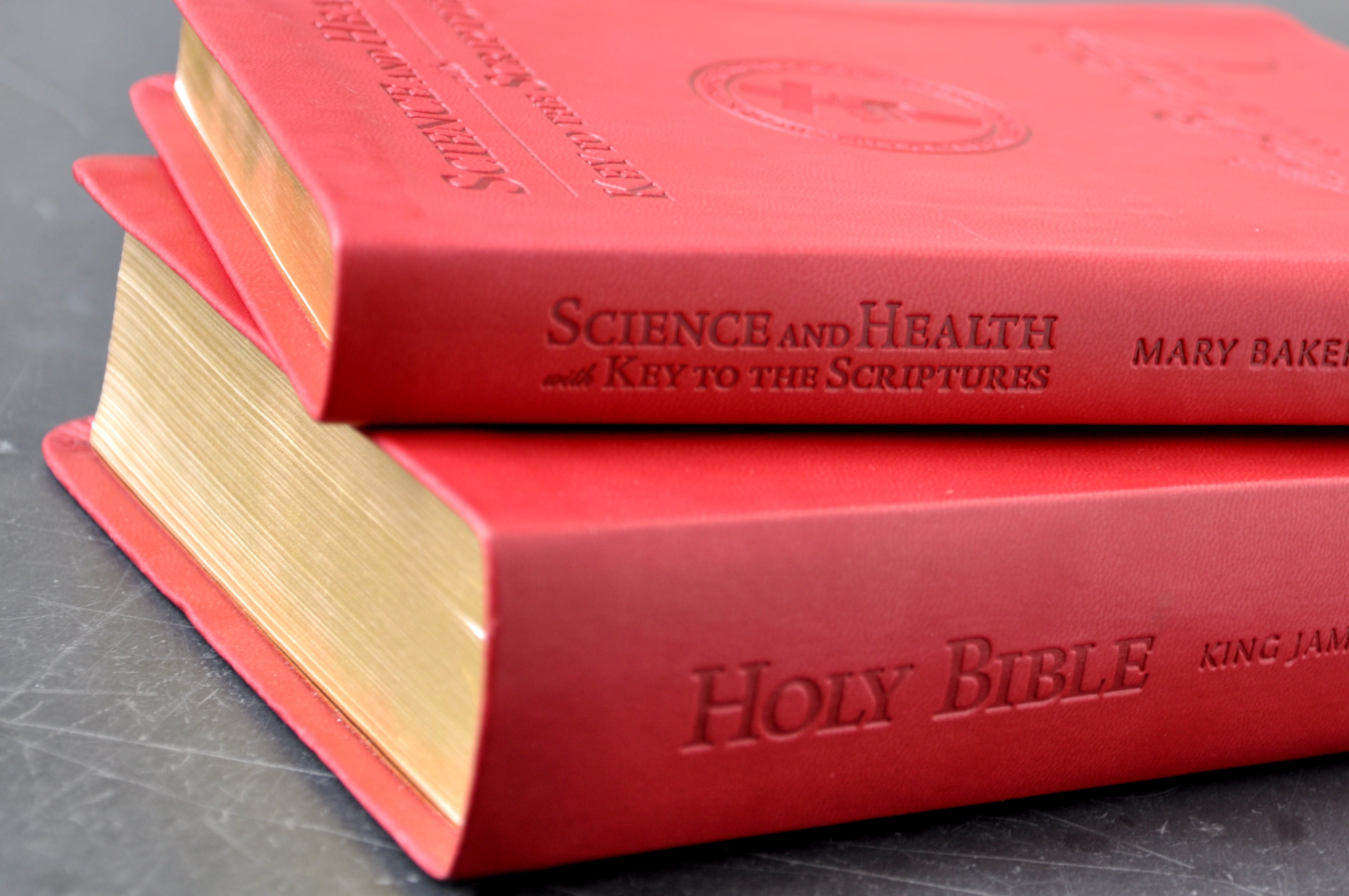
Bible and Science and Health with Key to the Scriptures, Christian Science's central texts

Eddy copyrighted her book, then called The Science of Life, in July 1874. Three of her students, George Barry, Elizabeth Newhall and Daniel Spofford, paid a Boston printer, W. F. Brown and Company, $2,200 to produce the first edition. The printer began work in September 1874, but stopped whenever the advance payment ran out, so progress was slow. The book—Science and Health by Mary Baker Glover, with eight chapters and 456 pages—finally appeared on October 30, 1875, published in the name of the Christian Science Publishing Company.

The book was positively received by Amos Bronson Alcott, who in 1876 wrote to Eddy that she had "reaffirm[ed] in modern phrase the Christian revelations," and that he was pleased it had been written by a woman. The printer's proofreading had been poor. Martin Gardner called the first edition a "chaotic patchwork of repetitious, poorly paragraphed topics," with spelling, punctuation and grammatical mistakes.

Eddy changed printers for the second edition, which was also poorly proofread, and for the third edition in 1881 switched again, this time to John Wilson & Sons, University Press, Cambridge, MA. John Wilson and his successor, William Dana Orcutt, continued to print the book until after Eddy's death. To the 6th edition in 1883, Eddy added with a Key to the Scriptures (later retitled with Key to the Scriptures), a 20-page glossary containing her definitions of biblical terms. The book sold 15,000 copies between 1875 and 1885.

In August 1885, on the advice of John Wilson, she hired one of his proofreaders, the Rev. James Henry Wiggin, as an editor and literary adviser. The issue of how much Wiggin contributed to Science and Health is controversial. A former Unitarian clergyman, he was the book's editor from the 16th edition in 1886 until the 50th in 1891—22 editions appeared between 1886 and 1888 alone—and according to his literary executor, speaking after Wiggin's death, said he had rewritten it. Robert Peel wrote that Wiggin had "toned up" Eddy's style, but had not affected her thinking. In a letter to Wiggin in July 1886, Eddy wrote: "Never change my meaning, only bring it out."

Eddy continued to revise the book until her death in 1910. In 1902 she added a chapter, "Fruitage," recounting healing testimonies from the Christian Science Journal and Christian Science Sentinel. There were over 400 editions (the final ran to 18 chapters and 600 pages), seven of them major revisions, according to Gottschalk, and members were encouraged to buy them all. Other income derived from the sale of rings and brooches, pictures of Eddy, and in 1889 the Mary Baker Eddy souvenir spoon; Eddy asked every Christian Scientist to buy at least one, or a dozen if they could afford to. When the copyright on Science and Health expired in 1971, the church persuaded Congress to extend it to 2046. The bill was supported by two of President Richard Nixon's aides, Christian Scientists H. R. Haldeman and John Ehrlichman. The law was overturned as unconstitutional in 1987, after a challenge by United Christian Scientists, an independent group. By 2001 Science and Health had sold over nine million copies.

==== Sickness as error ====
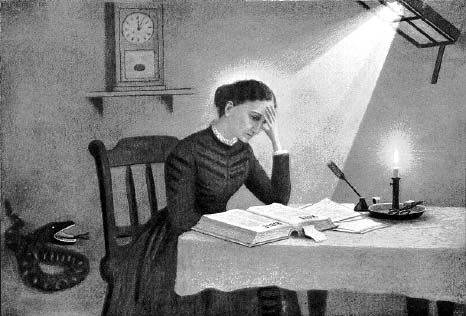
Eddy in her skylight room at 8 Broad Street, Lynn, from her illustrated poem, Christ and Christmas (1893).

Science and Health expanded on Eddy's view that sickness was a mental error. (Note: Eddy, Science and Health, 1875: "Palsy is a belief that attacks mind, and holds a limb inactive independent of the mind's consent, but the fact that a limb is moved only with mind proves the opposite, namely, that mind renders it also immovable.") People said that simply reading Science and Health had healed them; cures were claimed for everything from cancer to blindness. Eddy wrote in the New York Sun in December 1898, in an article called "To the Christian World," that she had personally healed tuberculosis, diphtheria and "at one visit a cancer that had eaten the flesh of the neck and exposed the jugular vein so that it stood out like a cord. I have physically restored sight to the blind, hearing to the deaf, speech to the dumb, and have made the lame walk." (Note: Eddy, December 16, 1898: "After my discovery of Christian Science, I healed consumption in the last stages, a case which the M.D.'s, by verdict of the stethoscope and the schools, had declared incurable, because the lungs were mostly consumed. I healed malignant diphtheria and carious bones that could be dented by the finger, saving the limbs when the surgeon's instruments were lying on the table ready for their amputation. I have healed at one visit a cancer that had eaten the flesh of the neck and exposed the jugular vein so that it stood out like a cord. I have physically restored sight to the blind, hearing to the deaf, speech to the dumb, and have made the lame walk.") Eddy wrote that her views had derived, in part, from having witnessed the apparent recovery of patients she had treated with homeopathic remedies so diluted they were drinking plain water. She concluded that Divine Mind was the healer:

The author has attenuated Natrum muriaticum (common table-salt) until there was not a single saline property left ... and yet, with one drop of that attenuation in a goblet of water, and a teaspoonful of the water administered at intervals of three hours, she has cured a patient sinking in the last stage of typhoid fever. The highest attenuation of homœopathy and the most potent rises above matter into mind. This discovery leads to more light. From it may be learned that either human faith or the divine Mind is the healer and that there is no efficacy in a drug.

She argued that even naming and reading about disease could turn thoughts into physical symptoms, and that the recording of ages might reduce the human lifespan. To explain how individuals could be harmed by poison without holding beliefs about it, she referred to the power of majority opinion. Eddy allowed exceptions from Christian Science prayer, including for dentistry, optometry and broken limbs; she said she had healed broken bones using "mental surgery," but that this skill would be the last to be learned. (Note: Eddy, Science and Health: "Until the advancing age admits the efficacy and supremacy of Mind, it is better for Christian Scientists to leave surgery and the adjustment of broken bones and dislocations to the fingers of a surgeon, while the mental healer confines himself chiefly to mental reconstruction and to the prevention of inflammation. Christian Science is always the most skilful surgeon, but surgery is the branch of its healing which will be last acknowledged. However, it is but just to say that the author has already in her possession well-authenticated records of the cure, by herself and her students through mental surgery alone, of broken bones, dislocated joints, and spinal vertebræ.") But for the most part (then and now), Christian Scientists believe that medicine and Christian Science are incompatible. Medicine asserts that something needs to be fixed, while Christian Science asserts that spiritual reality is perfect and beliefs to the contrary need to be corrected.

In the 1890s Richard Cabot of Harvard Medical School studied the healing testimonies published by the Christian Science Journal, which Eddy founded in 1883, for his senior thesis. He wrote in McClure's in 1908 that the claims were based on self-diagnosis or secondhand reports from doctors, and attributed them to the placebo effect. In 1900 medical lecturer William Purrington called the beneficiaries "hysterical patients ... the victims of obscure nervous ailments."

Rodney Stark writes that a key to Christian Science's appeal at the time was that its success rate compared favorably with that of physicians, particularly when it came to women's health. Most doctors had not been to medical school, there were no antibiotics, and surgical practices were poor. By comparison the placebo effect (being treated at all, no matter what the treatment was) worked well. Stark argues that the "very elaborate and intensely psychological Christian Science 'treatments' maximize such effects, while having the advantage of not causing further harm."

=== Malicious animal magnetism ===
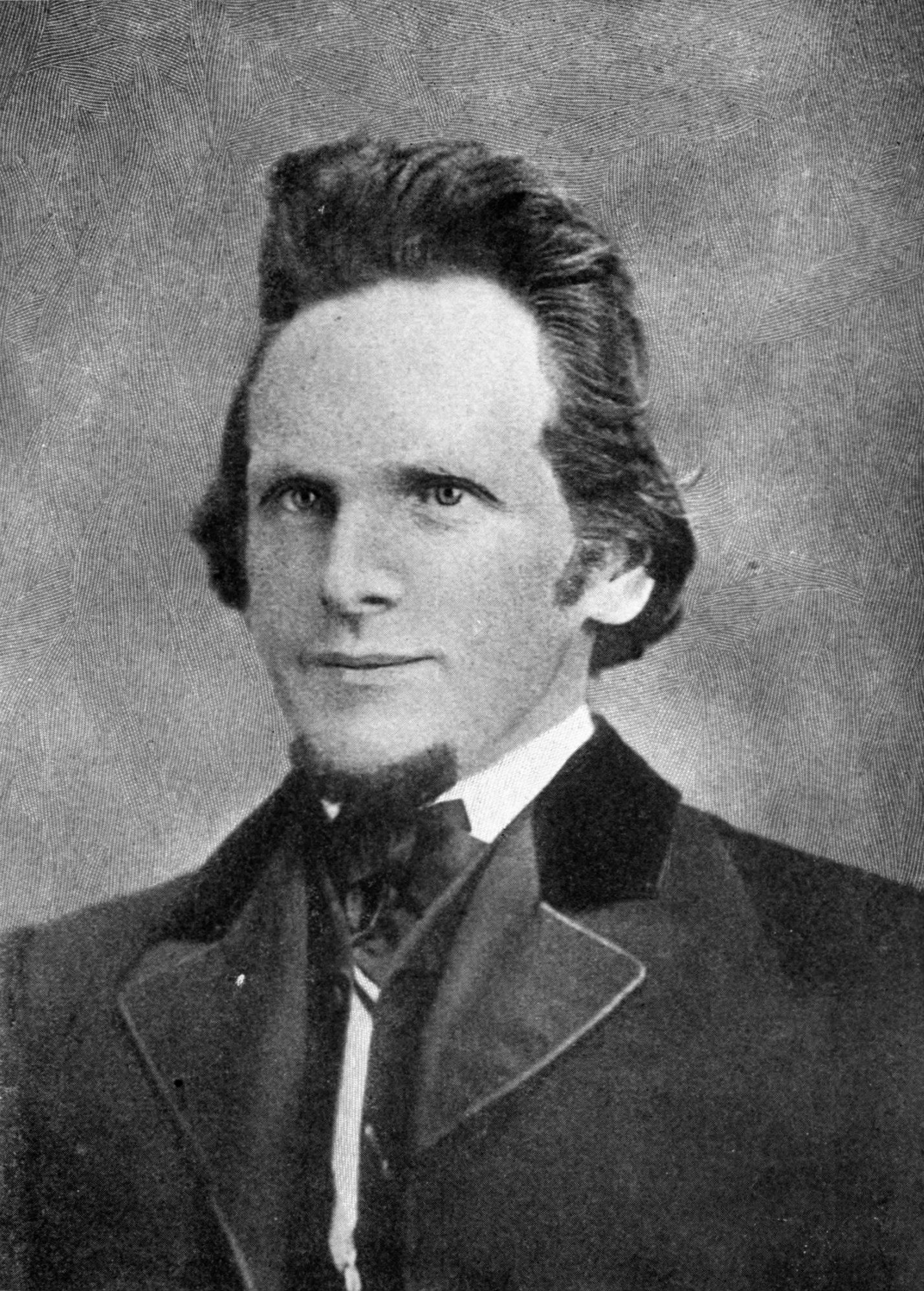
Asa Gilbert Eddy (1826–1882)

In January 1877 Eddy spurned an approach from Daniel Spofford, and to everyone's surprise married another of her students, Asa Gilbert Eddy. Eddy already believed that her former student and business partner Richard Kennedy was plotting against her. Weeks after the wedding Spofford was suspected too. She had hinted in October 1876 that he might be a successor, but instead he was expelled from the Christian Scientists' Association for "immorality" after quarrelling with her over money. She filed lawsuits against him and others for royalties or unpaid tuition fees. McClure's wrote that Eddy required "absolute and unquestioning conformity" from her students.

The conviction that she was at the center of plots and counter-plots became a feature of Eddy's life. She believed that several students were using what she called "malicious animal magnetism," or evil thought, against her. (Note: Gillian Gill, 1998: "'Malicious Animal Magnetism' is an important concept in Christian Science which bears many and contested meanings. Some Christian Science scholars argue that 'Malicious Animal Magnetism' or 'M.A.M' is a term used by Mary Baker Eddy's detractors, and that she herself, as her doctrine evolved, preferred the term 'malicious malpractice.' I have been assured by other scholars who have had access to Mrs. Eddy's correspondence that she herself used 'malicious animal magnetism,' 'mesmerism,' and 'malicious malpractice' interchangeably.") (She also referred to it as An. Mag., Mes., M.A.M., m.a.m., mesmerism, malicious mesmerism, animal magnetism, mental malpractice, malicious malpractice, and mental influence.)

Wilson writes that the concept of malicious animal magnetism was an important one in Christian Science. In 1881 Eddy added a 46-page chapter on it, "Demonology", to Science and Health. (Note: Eddy, Science and Health, 1889: "Animal magnetism is literally demonology ... Christian Science stands preeminent for promoting affection and virtue, in families and the community. Opposed to this healthful and elevating influence of Mind, as if to forestall the power of good, a baneful and secret mental influence has uprisen; but Science can and will meet all emergencies, and restore the normal standard of harmony.") From the 16th edition in 1886, when James Henry Wiggin became the book's editor, the chapter was reduced and renamed, and in the final edition is a seven-page chapter called "Animal Magnetism Unmasked". Eddy spoke openly about it, including to the press. When her husband died in 1882 she told the Boston Globe that malicious animal magnetism had killed him.

While Eddy argued that reality was entirely spiritual (and therefore entirely good), it remained true that human beings were affected by their belief in evil, which meant it had power, even if the power was an illusion. Evil was "like a bankrupt to whom credit is still granted", writes Wilson. To defend herself against it, Eddy organized "watches", during which students (known as mental or metaphysical workers) would give "adverse treatment" to her enemies. This was called "taking up the enemy in thought". According to former students, Eddy would tell them to say (often with Richard Kennedy in mind): "You are affected as you wish to affect me. Your evil thought reacts upon you," then to call Kennedy bilious, consumptive or poisoned by arsenic.

Eddy set up what she called a secret society of her students (known as the P. M., or private meeting) to deal with malicious animal magnetism, but she said that the group only met twice. In her later years, Wilson writes, Eddy came to see animal magnetism as an impersonal force and concluded that individuals ought not to be "taken up in thought". From 1890 she felt that her students were focusing on it too much, and thereafter public discussion of malicious animal magnetism declined, although Gottschalk adds that it continued to play an important role in the teaching of Christian Science. Adam H. Dickey, Eddy's private secretary for the last three years of her life, wrote that hour-long watches were held in her home three times a day to protect her against it. The Manual of the Mother Church forbids members from practising it, and requires that Christian Science teachers instruct students "how to defend themselves against mental malpractice, and never to return evil for evil". (Note: Manual of the Mother Church: "Teachers shall instruct their pupils how to defend themselves against mental malpractice, never to return evil for evil, but to know the truth that makes free, and thus to be a law, not unto others, but to themselves.")

=== Witchcraft trial, conspiracy charge ===
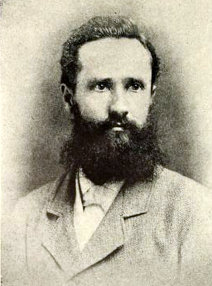
Daniel Spofford

In May 1878 Eddy brought a case against Daniel Spofford, in Salem, Massachusetts, for practicing mesmerism. It came to be known as the second Salem witchcraft trial. The case was filed in the name of one of Spofford's patients, Lucretia Brown, who said that he had bewitched her, though Eddy appeared in court on Brown's behalf. In preparation for the hearing, Eddy organized a 24-hour watch at 8 Broad Street, during which she asked 12 students to think about Spofford for two hours each and block malicious mesmerism from him. She arrived at the court with 20 supporters, including Amos Bronson Alcott (a "cloud of witnesses," according to the Boston Globe), but Judge Horace Gray dismissed the case.

The attempt to have Spofford tried was not the end of the dispute. In October 1878 Eddy's husband and another student, Edward Arens, were charged with conspiring to murder Spofford. A barman said they had offered him $500 to do it; after a complex series of claims and counter-claims, the charges were dropped when a witness retracted his statement. Eddy attributed the allegation to a plot by former students to undermine sales of the second edition of Science and Health, just published. Her lawyer had to apply for an attachment order against her house to collect his fee.

=== Establishing the church, move to Boston ===
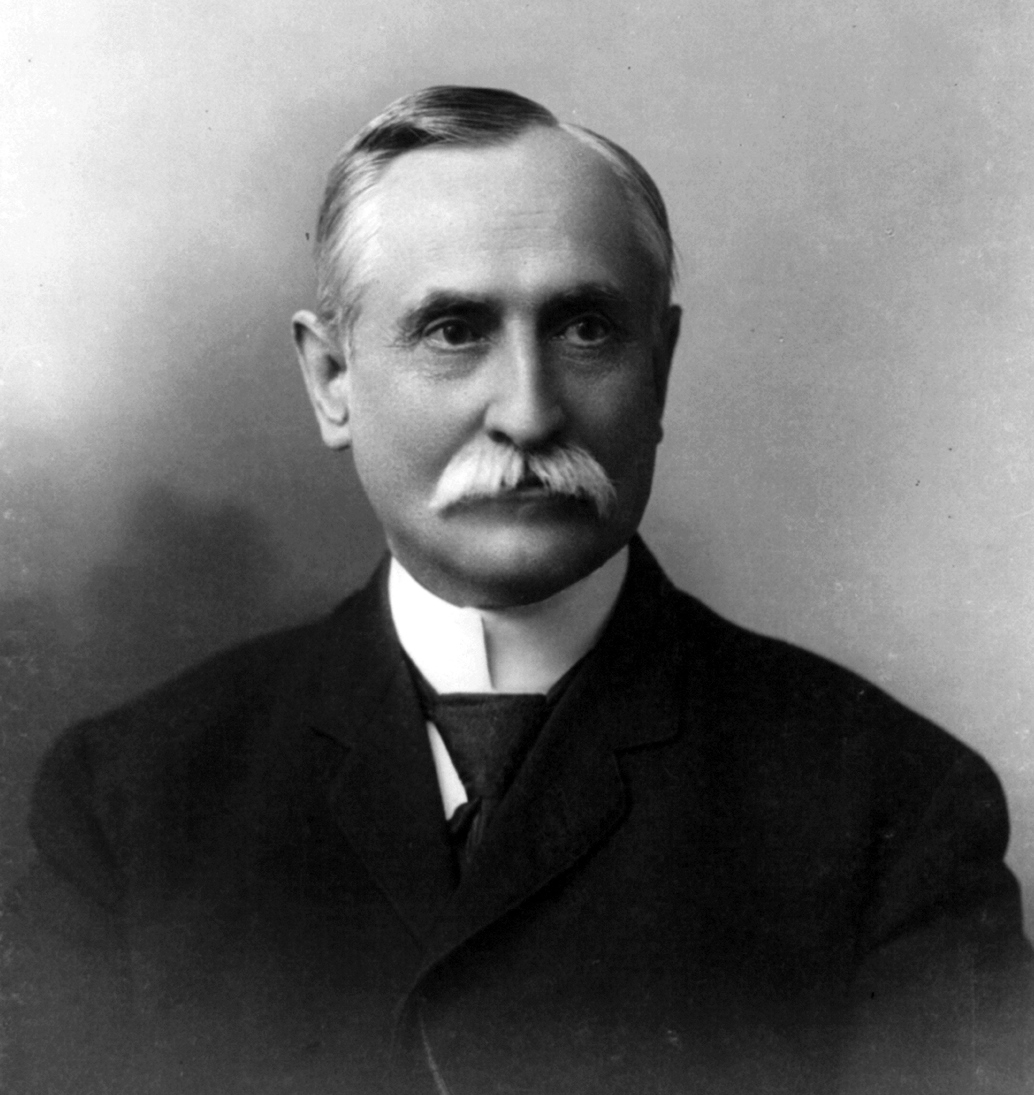
Calvin Frye (1845–1917) was one of the few students who stayed with Eddy in 1881; he remained loyal to her for the rest of her life.

On August 23, 1879, 26 members of the Christian Scientists' Association were granted a charter to form the Church of Christ (Scientist). Services were held in people's homes in Lynn and later in Hawthorne Hall, Boston. On January 31, 1881, Eddy was granted a charter to form the Massachusetts Metaphysical College to teach "pathology, ontology, therapeutics, moral science, metaphysics, and their application to the treatment of disease." The college lived wherever Eddy did; a new sign appeared on 8 Broad Street.

In October 1881 there was a revolt. Eight church members resigned, signing a document complaining of Eddy's "frequent ebullitions of temper, love of money, and the appearance of hypocrisy." Only a few students remained, including Calvin Frye, who became Eddy's most loyal personal assistant. They appointed Eddy pastor of the church in November 1881, and drew up a resolution in February 1882 that she was "the chosen messenger of God to the nations."

Despite the support, the resignations ended Eddy's time in Lynn. The church was struggling and her reputation had been damaged by the disputes. By now 61 years old, she decided to move to Boston, and in early 1882 rented a house at 569 Columbus Avenue, a silver plaque announcing the arrival of the Massachusetts Metaphysical College. The college's prospectus, published in 1884, offered three diplomas: Christian Scientist (C.S.) for Christian Scientists' Association members; Christian Metaphysician (C.M.) for Eddy's 12-lesson course and three years' practice; and Doctor of Christian Science (D.C.S.) for C.M.s whose "life and character conform to Divine science." In 1886, the Bachelor of Christian Science (C.S.B.) diploma was offered. Students could study metaphysics, science of the scriptures, mental healing and obstetrics, using two textbooks, Science and Health and the Bible. Between 1881 and October 1889, when Eddy closed the college, 4,000 students took the course at $300 per person or married couple, making her a rich woman. Mark Twain wrote sarcastically that she had turned a sawdust mine (possibly Quimby's) into a Klondike.

=== Death of Asa Gilbert Eddy ===
Eddy's husband, Asa Gilbert Eddy, died of heart disease on June 4, 1882, shortly after the move to Boston. She invited the Boston Globe to her home on the day of his death to allege that he had been killed by malicious animal magnetism, courtesy of "certain parties here in Boston, who had sworn to injure them." The Globe wrote:

She had formerly had the same symptoms of arsenical poison herself, and it was some time before she discovered it to be the mesmeric work of an enemy. Soon after her marriage her husband began to manifest the same symptoms and had since shown them from time to time; but was, with her help, always able to overcome them. A few weeks ago she observed that he did not look well, and when questioned he said that he was unable to get the idea of this arsenical poison out of his mind. He had been steadily growing worse ever since, but still had hoped to overcome the trouble until the last. After the death the body had turned black.

A doctor performed an autopsy and showed Eddy her husband's diseased heart, but she responded by giving more interviews about mesmerism. Fraser wrote that the articles made Eddy a household name, a real-life version of the charismatic and beautiful Verena Tarrant in Henry James's The Bostonians (1885–1886), with her interest in spiritualism, women's rights and the mind cure. Shortly after the death, Eddy moved next door to 571 Columbus Avenue with several students. The following year, 1883, she founded the Journal of Christian Science (later called the Christian Science Journal), which spread news of her ideas across the United States.

=== Tremont Temple, first church building ===
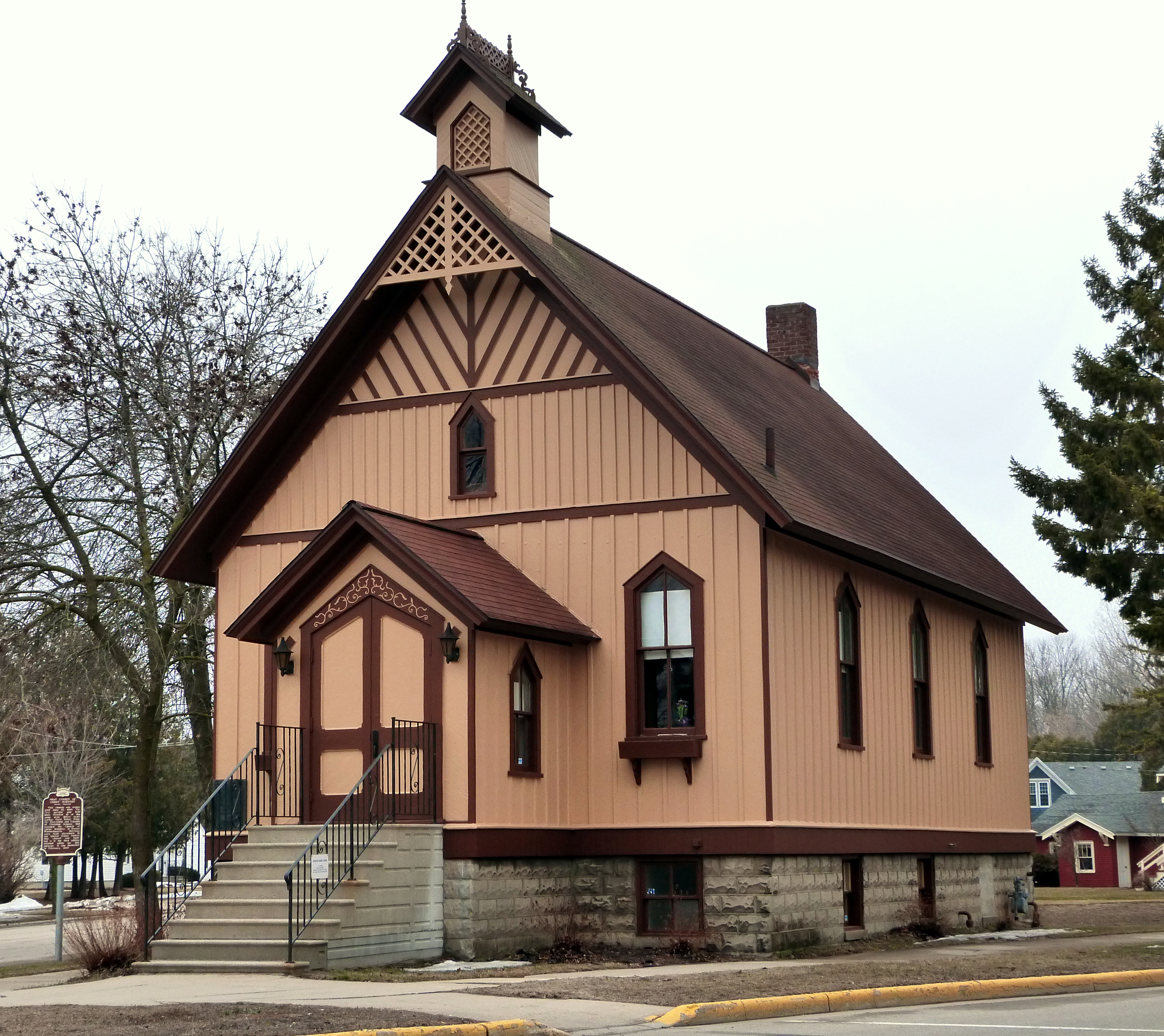
The first Christian Science church building was the First Church of Christ, Scientist, Oconto, Wisconsin, erected in 1886.

In 1885 Eddy was accused of promoting Spiritualism and pantheism by the Reverend Adoniram J. Gordon, in a letter read out by Joseph Cook during one of his popular Monday lectures at Tremont Temple in Boston. She demanded a right of reply, and on March 16, 1885, she told the congregation that she was not a Spiritualist, and that she believed in God as the Supreme Being and in the atonement. She described Christian Science healing as "Christ come to destroy the power of the flesh." Stephen Gottschalk wrote that the occasion marked the "emergence of Christian Science into American religious life."

The first church building was erected in 1886 in Oconto, Wisconsin, by local women who believed Christian Science had helped them. For a down payment of $2,000 and a mortgage of $8,763, the church purchased land in Falmouth Street, Boston, for the erection of a building. Eddy asked Augusta Stetson, a prominent Scientist, to establish a church in New York. By the end of 1886 Christian Science teaching institutes had sprung up around the United States.

In December 1887 Eddy moved to a $40,000, 20-room house at 385 Commonwealth Avenue, Boston. She had been teaching four to six classes a year, and by 1889 had probably made at least $100,000 (equivalent to $3,583,000 in 2025). By 1890 the Church of Christ (Scientist) had 8,724 members in the United States, having started 11 years earlier with just 26.

=== Eddy's debt to Quimby ===
Eddy's debt to Phineas Parkhurst Quimby became the "single most controversial issue" of her life, according to Gillian Gill. Quimby was not the only source Eddy stood accused of having copied; Ernest Sutherland Bates and John V. Dittemore, Bryan Wilson, Charles S. Braden and Martin Gardner identified several texts she had used without attribution. (Note: The writers whose work Eddy was accused of having used include John Ruskin, Thomas Carlyle, Charles Kingsley and Henri-Frédéric Amiel. According to Bates and Dittemore 1932, an essay, "Taking Offense," was printed as one of Eddy's when it had first been published anonymously by an obscure newspaper. Eddy was also accused, by Walter M. Haushalter in his Mrs. Eddy Purloins from Hegel, Boston: A. A. Beauchamp, 1936, of having copied material from "The Metaphysical Religion of Hegel" (1866), an essay by Francis Lieber.) For example, an open letter from Eddy to the church, dated September 1895 and published in Eddy's Miscellaneous Writings 1883–1896 (1897), is almost identical to Hugh Blair's essay "The Man of Integrity," published in Lindley Murray's The English Reader (1799). Eddy acknowledged Quimby's influence in her early years. When a prospective student asked in 1871 whether her methods had been used before, she replied:

Never advertised, and practiced by only one individual who healed me, Dr. Quimby of Portland, ME., an old gentleman who had made it a research for twenty-five years, starting from the standpoint of magnetism thence going forward and leaving that behind. I discovered the art in a moment's time, and he acknowledged it to me; he died shortly after and since then, eight years, I have been founding and demonstrating the science.

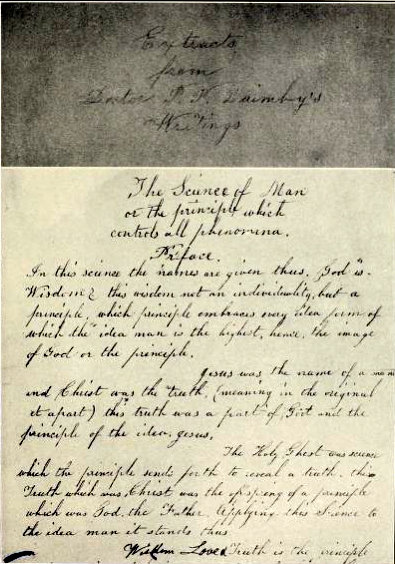
Manuscript that Eddy used when teaching Sally Wentworth, 1868–1870

Later she drew a distinction between their methods, arguing that Quimby's involved one mind healing another, while hers depended on a connection with Divine Mind. (Note: Eddy, Miscellaneous Writings, 1883–1896, 1897: "A 'mind-cure' is a matter-cure. ... The Theology of Christian Science is based on the action of the divine Mind over the human mind and body; whereas, 'mind-cure' rests on the notion that the human mind can cure its own disease, or that which it causes ...") In February 1883, Julius Dresser, a former patient of Quimby's, accused Eddy in letters to The Boston Post of teaching Quimby's work as her own. In response Eddy disparaged Quimby as a mesmerist and said she had experimented with mental healing in or around 1853, nine years before she met him. She wrote later: "We caught some of his thoughts, and he caught some of ours; and both of us were pleased to say this to each other."

The issue went to court in September 1883, when Eddy complained that her student Edward Arens had copied parts of Science and Health in a pamphlet, and Arens counter-claimed that Eddy had copied it from Quimby in the first place. (Note: The pamphlet was Theology, or the Understanding of God as Applied to Healing the Sick (1881). Arens credited Quimby, the Gottesfreunde, Jesus, and "some thoughts contained in a work by Eddy".) Quimby's son was so unwilling to produce his father's manuscripts that he sent them out of the country (perhaps fearing litigation with Eddy or that someone would tamper with them), and Eddy won the case. Things were stirred up further by Eddy's pamphlet Historical Sketch of Metaphysical Healing (1885), in which she again called Quimby a mesmerist, and by the publication of Julius Dresser's The True History of Mental Healing (1887).

The charge that Christian Science came from Quimby, not divine revelation, stemmed in part from Eddy's use of Quimby's manuscript (right) when teaching Sally Wentworth and others in 1868–1870. (Note: Ernest Sutherland Bates and John V. Dittemore, 1932: The title page stated "Extracts from Dr. P. P. Quimby's writings." On the next page there was a title, "The Science of Man or the principle which controls all phenomena." The preface was signed Mary M. Glover. A note in the margin said, "P. P. Q's mss," then Quimby's manuscript followed.) Eddy said she had helped to fix Quimby's unpublished work, and now stood accused of having copied her own corrections. (Note: Eddy, February 1899: "Quotations have been published, purporting to be Dr. Quimby's own words, which were written while I was his patient in Portland and holding long conversations with him on my views of mental therapeutics. Some words in these quotations certainly read like words that I said to him, and which I, at his request, had added to his copy when I corrected it. In his conversations with me and in his scribblings, the word science was not used at all, till one day I declared to him that back of his magnetic treatment and manipulation of patients, there was a science, and it was the science of mind, which had nothing to do with matter, electricity, or physics." Eddy, 1889: "Mr. Quimby's son has stated ... that he has in his possession all his father's written utterances; and I have offered to pay for their publication, but he declines to publish them; for their publication would silence the insinuation that Mr. Quimby originated the system of healing which I claim to be mine." Eddy, 1891: "In 1870 I copyrighted the first publication on spiritual, scientific Mind-healing, entitled The Science of Man. This little book is converted into the chapter on Recapitulation in Science and Health. It was so new—the basis it laid down for physical and moral health was so hopelessly original—that I did not venture upon its publication until later ...". "Five years after taking out my first copyright, I taught the Science of Mind-healing, alias Christian Science, by writing out my manuscripts for students and distributing them unsparingly. This will account for certain published and unpublished manuscripts extant, which the evil-minded would insinuate did not originate with me.") Against this, Lyman P. Powell, one of Eddy's biographers, wrote in 1907 that Quimby's son held an almost identical copy, in Quimby's wife's handwriting, of the Quimby manuscript that Eddy had used when teaching Sally Wentworth. It was dated February 1862, eight months before Eddy met Quimby.

In July 1904 the New York Times obtained a copy of the Quimby manuscript from Sally Wentworth's son, and juxtaposed passages with Science and Health to highlight the similarities. It also published Eddy's handwritten notes on Quimby's manuscript to show what the newspaper alleged was the transition from his words to hers. (Note: New York Times, July 10, 1904: The similarities included "Error is sickness, Truth is health" (Quimby manuscript), "Sickness is part of the error which Truth casts out" (Science and Health); "Truth is God" (Quimby), "Truth is God" (S&H); "Error is matter" (Quimby), "Matter is mortal error" (S&H); "Matter has no intelligence" (Quimby), "The fundamental error of mortal man is the belief that matter is intelligent" (S&H).) Quimby's manuscripts were published in 1921. Eddy's biographers continued to disagree about his influence on Eddy. Bates and Dittemore, the latter a former director of the Christian Science church, argued in 1932 that "as far as the thought is concerned, Science and Health is practically all Quimby," except for malicious animal mesmerism. Robert Peel, who also worked for the church, wrote in 1966 that Eddy may have influenced Quimby as much as he influenced her. Gardner argued in 1993 that Eddy had taken "huge chunks" from Quimby, and Gill in 1998 that there were only general similarities.

=== First prosecutions ===
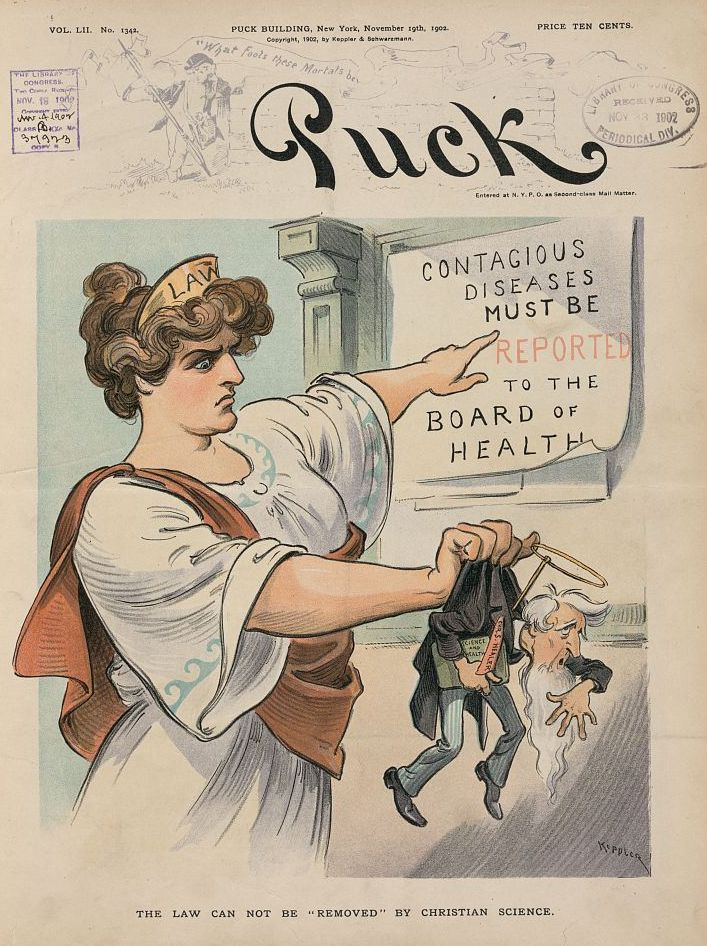
Cover of Puck magazine, November 19, 1902, by Udo Keppler. The caption says: "The law can not be 'removed' by Christian Science." The man with the beard is labeled "Chr. S. healer" and is holding a copy of Science and Health.

In 1887 Eddy started teaching a "metaphysical obstetrics" course, two one-week classes. She had started calling herself "Professor of Obstetrics" in 1882; McClure's wrote: "Hundreds of Mrs. Eddy's students were then practising who knew no more about obstetrics than the babes they helped into this world." The first prosecutions took place that year, when practitioners were charged with practicing medicine without a licence. All were acquitted during the trial, or convictions were overturned on appeal.

The first manslaughter charge was in March 1888, when Abby H. Corner, a practitioner in Medford, Massachusetts, attended to her daughter during childbirth; the daughter bled to death and the baby did not survive. The defense argued that they might have died even with medical attention, and Corner was acquitted. To the dismay of the Christian Scientists' Association (the secretary resigned), Eddy distanced herself from Corner, telling the Boston Globe that Corner had only attended the college for one term and had never entered the obstetrics class.

From then until the 1990s around 50 parents and practitioners were prosecuted, and often acquitted, after adults and children died without medical care; charges ranged from neglect to second-degree murder. The American Medical Association (AMA) declared war on Christian Scientists; in 1895 its journal called Christian Science and similar ideas "molochs to infants, and pestilential perils to communities in spreading contagious diseases." Juries were nevertheless reluctant to convict when defendants believed they were helping the patient. There was also opposition to the AMA's effort to strengthen medical licensing laws. Historian Shawn Peters writes that, in the courts and public debate, Christian Scientists and Jehovah's Witnesses linked their healing claims to early Christianity to gain support from other Christians.

Vaccination was another battleground. A Christian Scientist in Wisconsin won a case in 1897 that allowed his son to attend public school despite not being vaccinated against smallpox. Others were arrested in 1899 for avoiding vaccination during a smallpox epidemic in Georgia. In 1900 Eddy advised adherents to obey the law, "and then appeal to the gospel to save ...[themselves] from any bad results." In October 1902, after seven-year-old Esther Quimby, the daughter of Christian Scientists, died of diphtheria in White Plains, New York (she had received no medical care and had not been quarantined), the authorities pursued manslaughter charges. The controversy prompted Eddy to declare that "until public thought becomes better acquainted with Christian Science, the Christian Scientists shall decline to doctor infectious or contagious diseases", and from that time the church required Christian Scientists to report contagious diseases to health boards.

=== Building the Mother Church ===
Mother Church, Boston

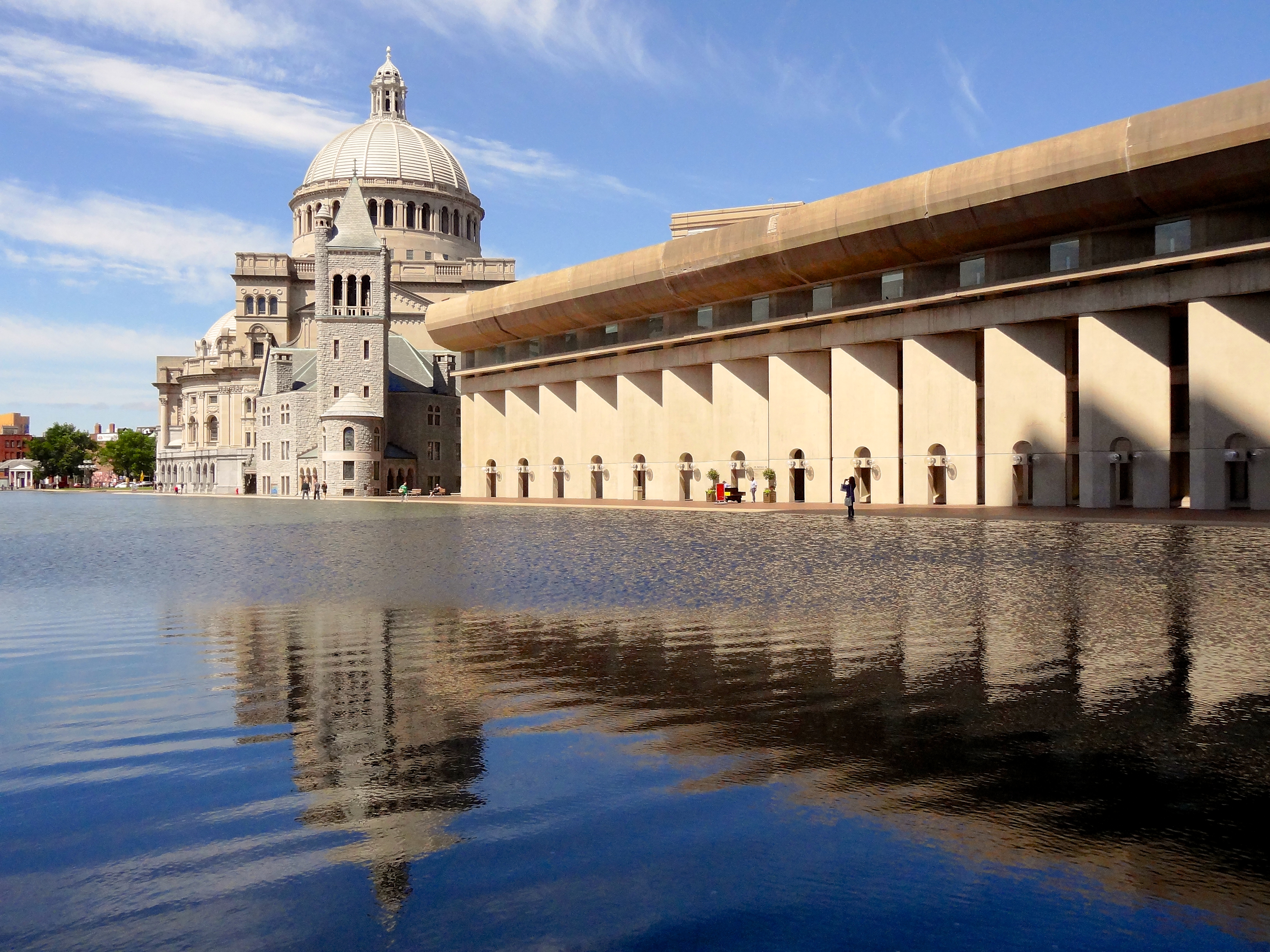
The original Mother Church (1894), the Mother Church Extension (1906) and the Colonnade Building (1972)

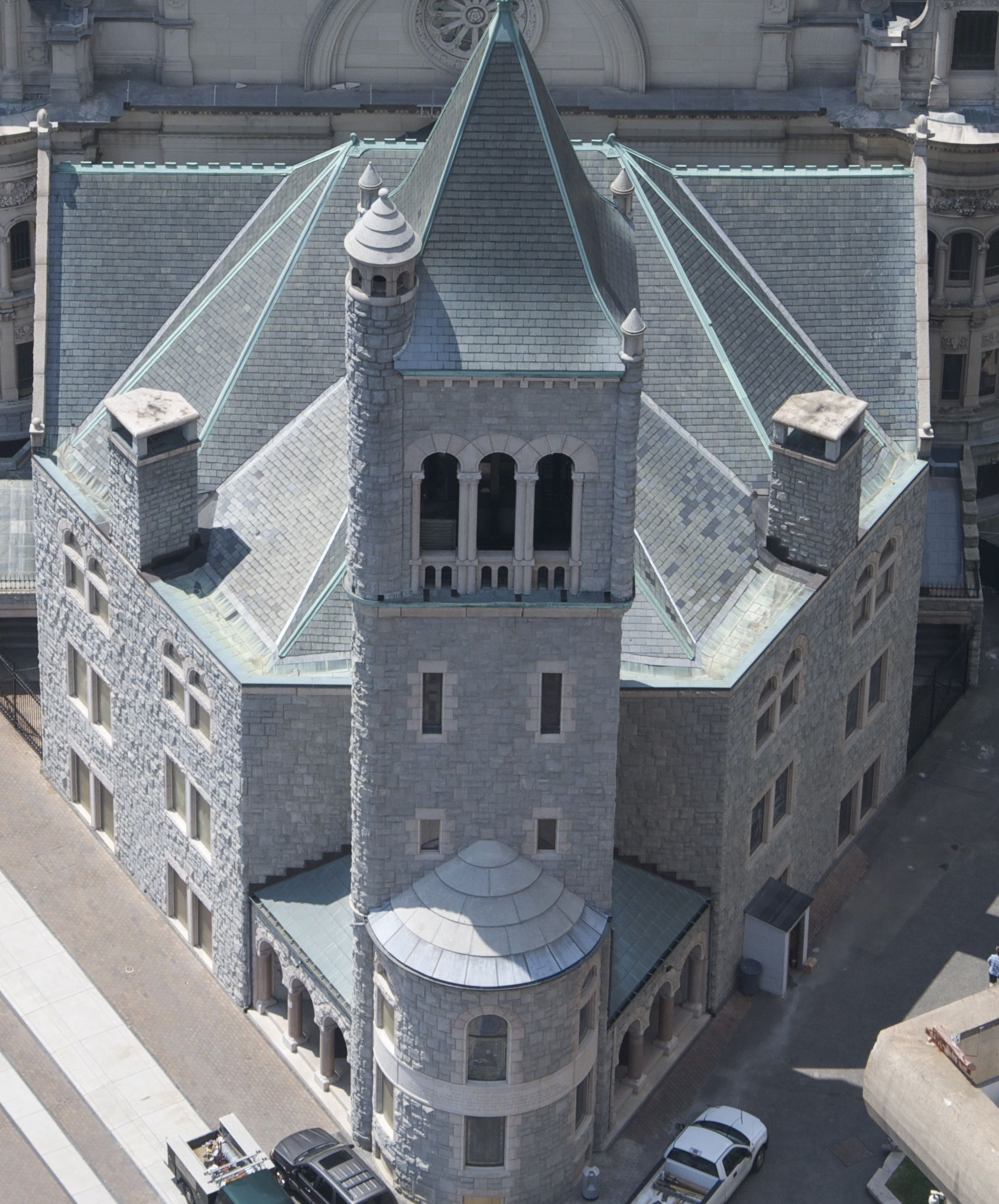
Original Mother Church

In 1888 Eddy became close to another of her students, Ebenezer Johnson Foster, a homeopath and graduate of the Hahnemann Medical College. He was 41 and she was 67, but apparently in need of affection and loyalty she adopted him legally in November that year, and he changed his name to Ebenezer Johnson Foster Eddy.

A year later, in October 1889, Eddy closed the Massachusetts Metaphysical College; according to Bates and Dittemore, the state attorney was investigating colleges that were fraudulently graduating medical students. She also foreclosed the mortgage on the land in Boston the church had purchased, then purchased it herself for $5,000 through a middle man, though it was worth considerably more. She told the church they could have the land for their building on condition they formally dissolve the church; this was apparently intended to quash internal rebellions that had been bothering her. The following year she dissolved the National Christian Science Association. Wilson writes that the dissolutions allowed her to create a central church controlled by a five-person board of directors that answered only to her, which gave the church a stability that helped it survive her death.

The cornerstone of The First Church of Christ, Scientist, containing the Bible, Eddy's writings and a list of directors and financial contributors, was laid in May 1894 in the Back Bay area of Boston. Church members raised funds for the construction, and the building was finished in December 1894 at a cost of $250,000. It contained a "Mother's Room" in the tower for Eddy's personal use, furnished with rare books, silks, tapestries, rugs, a dressing gown and slippers, though she spent only one night there and it was later turned into a storage room. The archway into the room was made of Italian marble, and the word Mother was engraved on the floor.

Within two years the Boston membership had exceeded the original church's capacity. By 1903 the block around the church had been purchased by Christian Scientists, and in 1906 the Mother Church Extension, accommodating 5,000 people, was completed at a cost of $2 million. This attracted the criticism that, whereas Christian Scientists spent money on a magnificent church, they maintained no hospitals, orphanages or missions in the slums.

Christian Science went on to become the fastest-growing American religion in the early 20th century. The federal religious census recorded 85,717 Christian Scientists in 1906; 30 years later it was 268,915. In 1890 there were seven Christian Science churches in the United States, a figure that had risen to 1,104 by 1910. Churches began to appear in other countries too: 58 in England, 38 in Canada and 28 elsewhere by 1910.

=== View of Mark Twain ===
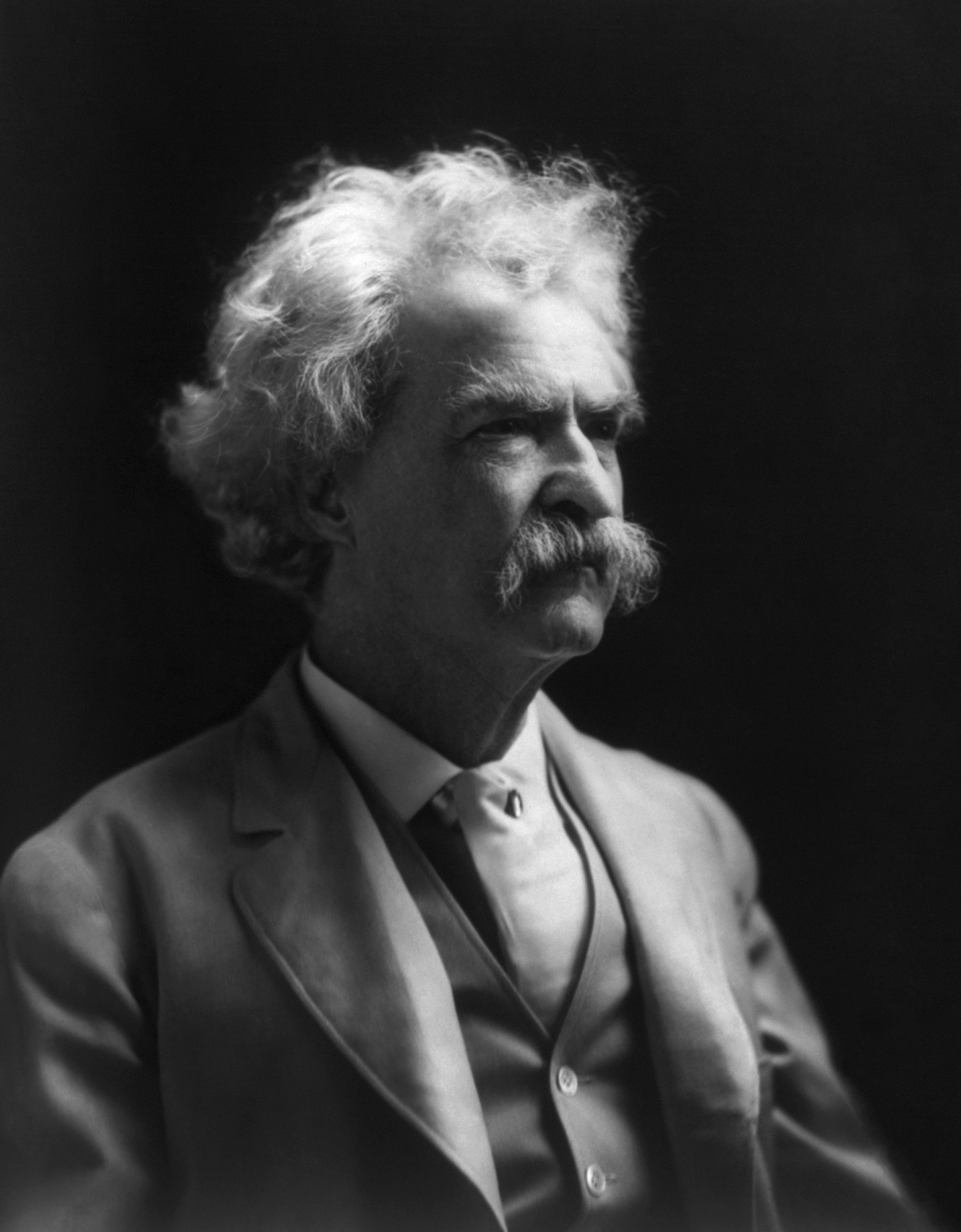
Mark Twain (1835–1910) in 1909

Mark Twain was a prominent contemporaneous critic of Eddy's. His first article about Christian Science was published in Cosmopolitan in October 1899. Another three appeared in 1902–1903 in North American Review, then a book, Christian Science (1907). He also wrote a satirical story, "The Secret History of Eddypus, the World Empire" (1901–1902), in which Christian Science replaces Christianity and Eddy becomes the Pope.

Twain described Eddy as "[g]rasping, sordid, penurious, famishing for everything she sees—money, power, glory—vain, untruthful, jealous, despotic, arrogant, insolent, pitiless where thinkers and hypnotists are concerned, illiterate, shallow, incapable of reasoning outside of commercial lines, immeasurably selfish."

Science and Health he called "strange and frantic and incomprehensible and uninterpretable," and argued that Eddy had not written it herself. "There is nothing in Christian Science that is not explicable," he wrote, "for God is one, Time is one, Individuality is one, and may be one of a series, one of many, as an individual man, individual horse; whereas God is one, not one of a series, but one alone and without an equal." Eddy apart, Twain felt ambivalent toward mind-cure, arguing that "the thing back of it is wholly gracious and beautiful." (Note: Mark Twain, 1907: "For the thing back of it is wholly gracious and beautiful: the power, through loving mercifulness and compassion, to heal fleshly ills and pains and grief—all—with a word, with a touch of the hand! This power was given by the Saviour to the Disciples, and to all the converted. All—every one. It was exercised for generations afterwards. Any Christian who was in earnest and not a make-believe, not a policy-Christian, not a Christian for revenue only, had that healing power, and could cure with it any disease or any hurt or damage possible to human flesh and bone. These things are true, or they are not. If they were true seventeen and eighteen and nineteen centuries ago it would be difficult to satisfactorily explain why or how or by what argument that power should be nonexistent in Christians now.") His daughter Clara Clemens became a Christian Scientist and wrote a book about it, Awake to a Perfect Day (1956).

Albert Bigelow Paine, Twain's biographer, quotes Twain as satirically saying this about Mary Bakery Eddy: "Christian Science is humanity’s boon. Mother Eddy deserves a place in the Trinity as much as any member of it. She has organized and made available a healing principle that for two thousand years has never been employed, except as the merest guesswork. She is the benefactor of the age." — Mark Twain, A Biography, by Albert B. Paine, Vol. III, p. 1271."

=== McClure's articles ===
The first history of Christian Science appeared in McClure's magazine in 14 installments from January 1907 to June 1908, preceded by an editorial in December 1906. The essence of the articles, which included court documents and affidavits from Eddy's associates, was that Eddy's chief concern was money, and that she had derived Christian Science from Quimby. The material was also published as a book, The Life of Mary Baker G. Eddy and the History of Christian Science (1909). It became the key source for most non-church histories of the religion. The editor-in-chief assigned five writers to work on the series, including the novelist Willa Cather as the principal author. The book was kept out of print from early in its life by the Christian Science church, which bought the original manuscript. It was republished in 1971 by Baker Book House when its copyright expired, and again in 1993 by the University of Nebraska Press.

=== Next Friends suit, Eddy's death ===
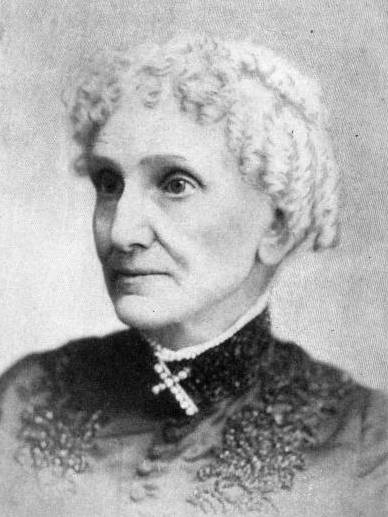
Mary Baker Eddy, 1892

In March 1907 several of Eddy's relatives filed an unsuccessful lawsuit, the "Next Friends suit," against members of Eddy's household, alleging that she was unable to manage her own affairs. Calvin Frye, her long-time personal assistant, was a particular target of the allegations. The New York World's front-page story in October 1906, headline "Mrs. Mary Baker G. Eddy Dying; Footman and Dummy Control Her," said that Eddy was housebound and dying of cancer, that her staff had taken control of her fortune, and that another woman was impersonating her in public.

The newspaper persuaded Eddy's family (or "next friends") to file a lawsuit. Several joined the action, including Eddy's biological son, George Glover, and adoptive son, Ebenezer J. Foster Eddy. Eddy was interviewed in her home in August 1907 by the judge and two psychiatrists, who concluded that she was mentally competent. In response to the McClure's and New York World stories, Eddy asked the church in July 1908 to found the Christian Science Monitor as a platform for responsible journalism. It appeared in November that year, with the motto "To injure no man, but to bless all mankind," and went on to win seven Pulitzer Prizes between 1950 and 2002.

Eddy died two years later, on the evening of Saturday, December 3, 1910, aged 89. The Mother Church announced at the end of the Sunday morning service that Eddy had "passed from our sight." It said that "the time will come when there will be no more death," but that Christian Scientists "do not look for [Mrs. Eddy's] return in this world." Her estate was valued at $1.5 million, most of which she left to the church.

== 1910-present ==
=== Decline ===
At the height of the religion's popularity in 1936, a census counted c. 268,915 Christian Scientists in the United States (2,098 per million). With the movement in decline, the church sold buildings to free up funds. It closed 23 of its churches in Los Angeles between 1960 and 1995, and in 2004 sold the First Church of Christ, Scientist, Manhattan, to the Crenshaw Christian Center for $14 million. (The building was sold again in 2014 to be converted into condominiums.)

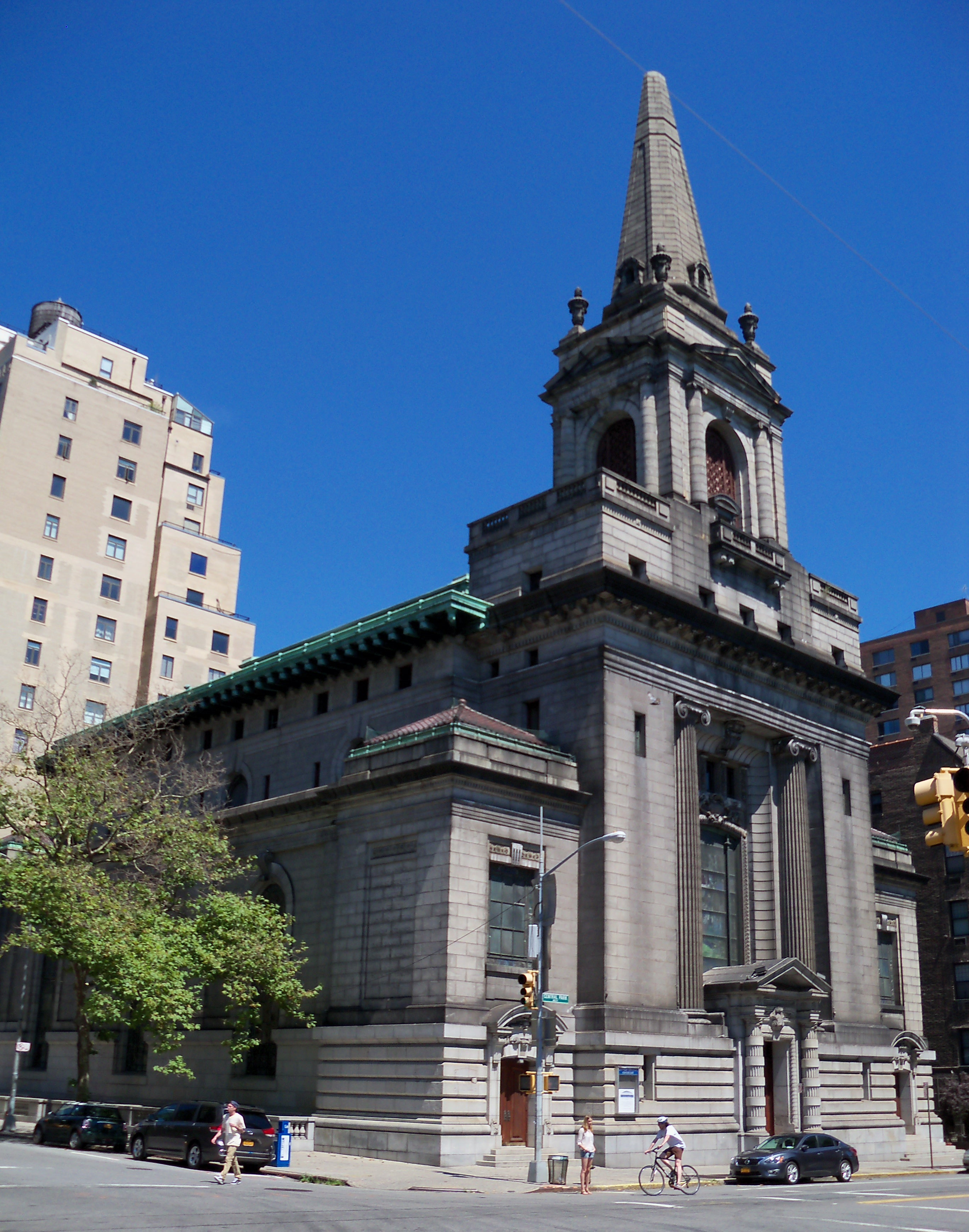
The First Church of Christ, Scientist, Manhattan, was sold in 2004 to the Crenshaw Christian Center.

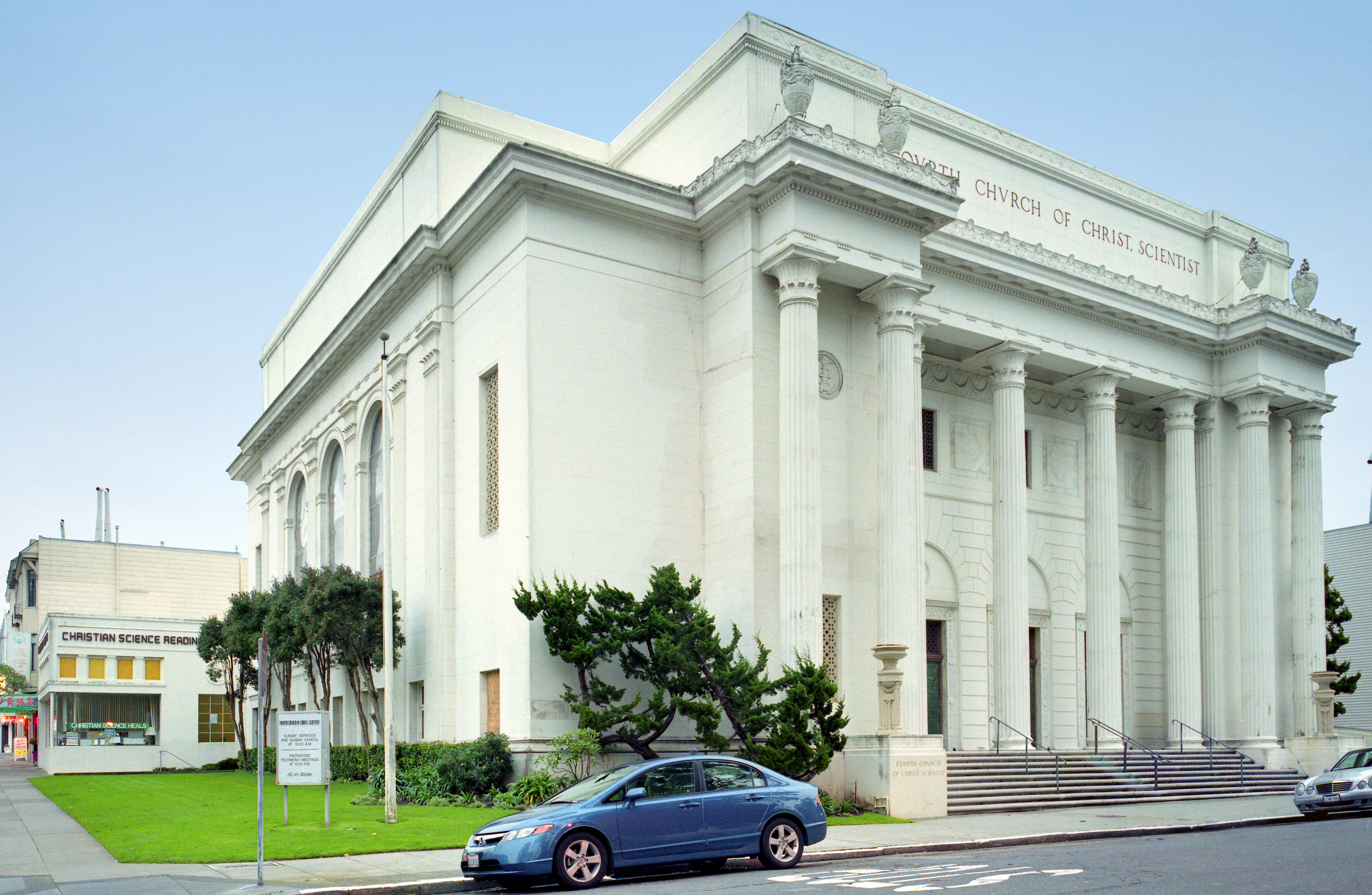
The Fourth Church of Christ, Scientist, San Francisco, was sold in 2009 to the Internet Archive.

There were an estimated 106,000 Christian Scientists in the United States in 1990 (427 per million), according to Rodney Stark. In 2009, the church said that for the first time more new members had been admitted from Africa than from the United States, although it offered no numbers. While the Manual of the Mother Church prohibits the church from publishing membership figures, (Note: Manual of the Mother Church: "Christian Scientists shall not report for publication the number of the members of The Mother Church, nor that of the branch churches. According to the Scripture they shall turn away from personality and numbering the people.") the church does provide the names of Christian Science practitioners (members trained to offer Christian Science prayer on behalf of others). In 1941 there were 11,200 practitioners in the United States, against 965 in 2015 (1,249 worldwide). Stark writes that clusters of practitioners listed in the Christian Science Journal in 1998 were living in the same retirement communities.

Number of Christian Science practitioners in the United States, 1883–2015
Year	Number of practitioners	Practitioners per million
1883	14	0.3
1887	110	1.9
1895	553	7.9
1911	3,280	34.9
1919	6,111	58.5
1930	9,722	79.0
1941	11,200	84.0
1945	9,823	70.2
1953	8,225	51.7
1972	5,848	28.0
1981	3,403	15.1
1995	1,820	6.9
2015	965	

Number of Christian Scientists in the United States, 1890–2009
Year	Number of followers	Source
1890	8,724	
1936	268,915	
1990	c. 106,000	
2009	under 50,000	

Stark attributes the rise of the movement in the late-19th and early-20th centuries to several factors, chiefly that medical practice was in its infancy. Because patients often fared better without medical treatment, Christian Science prayer was favorable in comparison. Other factors included that the church retained cultural continuity with Christianity by stressing that it was Christian and adopting its terms, despite the new content Eddy introduced. It was not puritanical. Members were expected not to drink or smoke, but could otherwise do as they pleased, and several exceptions to the avoidance of medicine were permitted.

In 1906, 72 percent of Christian Scientists in the United States were female, against 49 percent of the population. The church was attractive to women because it offered professional opportunities when it was difficult for women to find work outside the home. As Christian Scientists they could become practitioners after just 12 lessons. Of the 14 practitioners listed in the first edition of the Christian Science Journal, 12 were women.

The increased efficacy of medicine around World War II heralded the religion's decline. Stark charts the use of sulfonamide to kill bacteria, the availability of penicillin in the 1940s and breakthroughs in immunology. Other factors were increased career opportunities for women, and that much of the membership was elderly. In 1998 30 percent of Christian Scientists were over 65. Eddy was in her sixties by the time the movement began to spread. Stark writes that the "characteristics of the earliest members of a movement will tend to be reproduced in subsequent converts." A significant percentage of Scientists remained single (Eddy placed little emphasis on marriage and family), or became Scientists when their children were adults and unlikely to be converted. (Note: Rodney Stark, 1998: "[M]any female Christian Scientists never married, and many who did marry and have children did not convert until after their children were grown up. ... Christian Science is at least ambivalent towards marriage and sex and therefore tends to appeal to those to whom these least appeal. Mrs Eddy strongly advocated celibacy, but admitted that it would be irresponsible to prohibit marriage at present. This would be realized in a later stage of historical awareness. Nevertheless, she made it clear that when possible, it was better not to marry.") Christian Science did not have missionaries, so it relied on internal growth, but the conversion rate within families was not high. In a study cited by Stark, of 80 people raised within Christian Science just 26 (33 percent) became Scientists themselves.

=== Religious exemptions ===
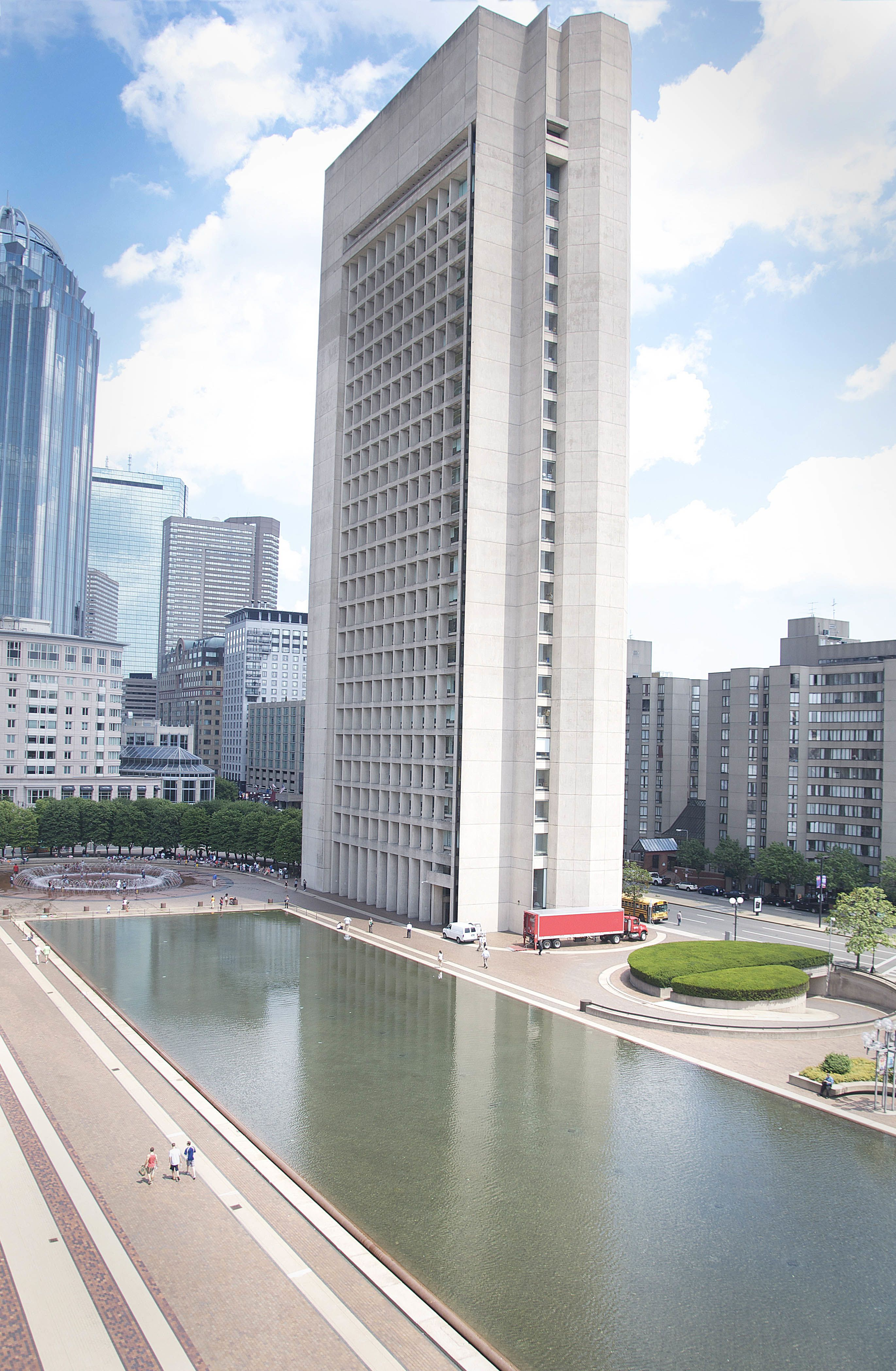
First Church of Christ, Scientist, administration building, Boston; in 2008 the church's staff were moved to the nearby Christian Science Publishing Society building.

The main criticism Christian Scientists face is that their children are denied equal protection under the law. Sick and disabled children have been told that the only thing wrong with them is "incorrect" thinking, and practitioners have told parents that the parents' thoughts can harm their children. (Note: Eddy, Science and Health: "If the case is that of a young child or an infant, it needs to be met mainly through the parent's thought, silently or audibly on the aforesaid basis of Christian Science. ... Mind regulates the condition of the stomach, bowels, and food, the temperature of children and of men, and matter does not. The wise or unwise views of parents and other persons on these subjects produce good or bad effects on the health of children.") The American Academy of Pediatrics regards failure to seek medical care for children as "child neglect, regardless of the motivation".

In the United States, the Christian Science church persuaded local and federal government to pass religious-exemption statutes, using the Free Exercise Clause of the First Amendment. The Free Exercise Clause reads: "Congress shall make no law respecting an establishment of religion, or prohibiting the free exercise thereof ...." Many of the exemptions say that in life-threatening situations children must have access to medical care, but without early access the seriousness of an illness may not be recognized, in part because Christian Scientists are discouraged from educating themselves about physical ailments. The first state to add a religion exemption for vaccination was New York in 1966, as a result of lobbying by Christian Scientists.

After the conviction for manslaughter in 1967 of the Christian Scientist mother of five-year-old Lisa Sheridan, who died without medical care in Cape Cod, Massachusetts, the church lobbied the United States Department of Health, Education, and Welfare (HEW) to add a religious exemption to the Code of Federal Regulations. Added in 1974, this stated that parents who did not provide medical treatment for a child for religious reasons would not be considered negligent. (Note: From 1974–1983, the United States Department of Health, Education, and Welfare religious exemption read: "A parent or guardian legitimately practicing his religious beliefs who thereby does not provide specified medical treatment for a child, for that reason alone shall not be considered a negligent parent or guardian; however, such an exception shall not preclude a court from ordering that medical services be provided to the child, where his health requires it.") States were thereafter obliged to include exemptions or lose funding; the wording of the exemptions made clear that they referred to Christian Science.

Largely as a result of lobbying by Children's Healthcare is a Legal Duty (active 1983–2017), the government eliminated the HEW regulation in 1983, but 39 states, as well as Guam and the District of Columbia, still had religious exemptions in their civil codes on child abuse and neglect as of February 2015. As of June 2019, the District of Columbia (Washington, D.C.) and 45 states granted religious exemptions, and 15 granted philosophical exemptions, from laws requiring vaccination. Three states (Arizona, Connecticut, and Washington) say that offering a child treatment from a Christian Science practitioner, "in lieu of medical care", is not regarded as neglect. The state of Washington religious exemption as of September 2019 reads: "It is the intent of the legislature that a person who, in good faith, is furnished Christian Science treatment by a duly accredited Christian Science practitioner in lieu of medical care is not considered deprived of medically necessary health care or abandoned." In 1985 128 people were infected with measles, and three died, at Principia College, a Christian Science school in Elsah, Illinois. In 1994, 190 people in six states were infected with measles traced to a child from a Christian Science family in Elsah. In Australia, the Christian Science church was the only group with a religious exemption for vaccination; this was removed in 2015.

=== Child deaths, prosecutions ===
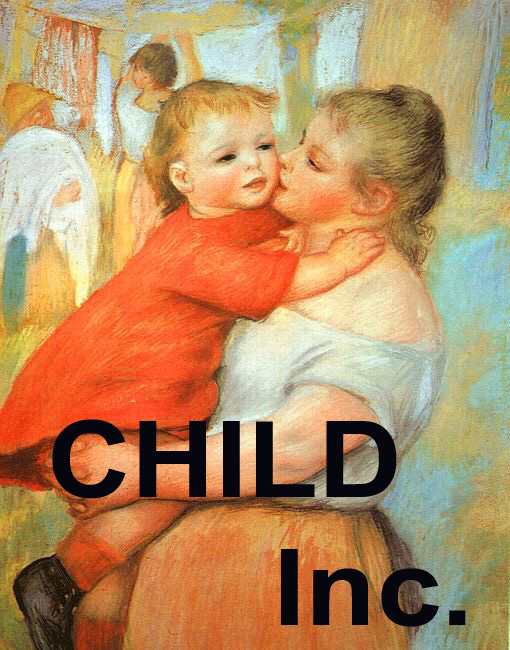
Children's Healthcare is a Legal Duty was set up in 1983 by former Christian Scientists Rita and Douglas Swan.

In over 50 cases between 1887 and the early 1990s, prosecutors charged Christian Scientists after adults and children died of treatable illnesses without medical care. (Note: A 1998 study in Pediatrics examined 172 child deaths between 1975 and 1995 where parents had withheld medical care for religious reasons; 28 involved Christian Science, the second highest number from a single group.) The death in 1967 of five-year-old Lisa Sheridan of pneumonia, in Cape Cod, Massachusetts, was the first of several in the 20th century known within the church as the "child cases," according to Fraser. Her mother was convicted of manslaughter and sentenced to five years' probation. It was after this prosecution that the church began lobbying for religious exemptions.

In 1977, 16-month-old Matthew Swan died of bacterial meningitis in Detroit, Michigan, after his parents were persuaded not to seek timely medical care; they responded by founding Children's Healthcare is a Legal Duty (CHILD) in 1983. Between 1980 and 1990, seven Christian Scientist parents in the United States were prosecuted; there were four convictions, two overturned. In 1988, 12-year-old Ashley King died in Phoenix, Arizona, after living for months with a tumor on her leg that had a 41-inch (1,000 mm) circumference. Her parents pleaded guilty to reckless endangerment. A prominent case in Massachusetts was Commonwealth v. Twitchell in 1990, which saw the parents of two-year-old Robyn Twitchell convicted of involuntary manslaughter after he died of peritonitis. The conviction was overturned; the appellate court ruled that the couple had "reasonably believed" they could rely on Christian Science prayer without being prosecuted.

In 1993, the church was held liable for the first time (overturned on appeal), after 11-year-old Ian Lundman died of hyperglycemia in Minnesota in 1989. The church sent a Christian Science nurse to sit with him; doctors testified that he could have been saved by an insulin injection up to two hours before his death. (Note: The nurse sat with Ian Lundman for five hours. Sixteen minutes before her diary said that he had stopped breathing, she wrote "passing possible".) The mother and stepfather were charged with manslaughter, but the charges were dismissed. The boy's father, Douglass Lundman, sued the mother, stepfather, practitioner, nurse, nursing home and church. He was awarded $5.2 million compensatory damages, later reduced to $1.5 million, and $9 million in punitive damages against the church. The Minnesota State Court of Appeals overturned the award against the church and nursing home in 1995, finding that a judgment that forced the church to "abandon teaching its central tenet" was unconstitutional, and that while the individuals had a duty of care toward the boy, the church and nursing home did not.

=== Knapp book ===
The church faced internal dissent in 1991 over its decision to publish The Destiny of The Mother Church. Written and privately printed in 1943 by Bliss Knapp, former president of the Mother Church, the book suggested that Eddy was the Woman of the Apocalypse of the New Testament. Knapp and his family bequeathed $98 million to the church on condition that it publish and authorize the book by 1993; otherwise the money would go to Stanford University and the Los Angeles County Museum of Art. The church published and made the book available in Christian Science reading rooms. One senior employee was fired for failing to support the church's decision, and 18 of the 21 editorial staff of the religious journals resigned. In the end the other parties disputed that making the book available in Reading Rooms constituted authorization, and the bequest was split three ways.

== See also ==
- History of Christianity
- History of Christianity in the United States
- Religion in the United States

== Footnotes ==
=== Works cited ===
- Gill, Gillian (1998). Mary Baker Eddy. Da Capo Press. ISBN 978-0-7382-0042-2.
