= John V. Dittemore =

Church director and author (1876–1937)

John Valentine Dittemore
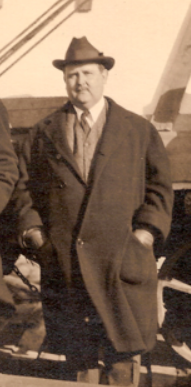
- Born: September 30, 1876; Indianapolis
- Died: May 10, 1937 (aged 60); New York
- Occupations: Packing company executive; Committee on Publication; church director; author

John Valentine Dittemore (September 30, 1876 - May 10, 1937) was the director of The First Church of Christ, Scientist, the Christian Science church, in Boston from 1909 until 1919. Before that he was head of the church's Committee on Publication in New York, and a trustee for ten years of the estate of Mary Baker Eddy (1821–1910), the founder of the church. Dittemore is best known as the co-author, with Ernest Sutherland Bates, of Mary Baker Eddy: The Truth and the Tradition (1932).

== Biography ==
Dittemore was born in Indianapolis to Mary E. Cress Dittemore and John W. Dittemore. He attended Ohio Military Institute and Phillips Academy Andover. After graduating he became president of the Federal Packing Company and vice-president of the Van Camp Packing Company.

=== Christian Science church involvement ===
Dittemore became known for his involvement with The First Church of Christ, Scientist in Boston, the mother church and administrative headquarters of the Christian Science religion. As head of the church's Committee on Publication, Dittemore commissioned The Life of Mary Baker Eddy by Sibyl Wilbur, the first church-authorized biography of the religion's founder, Mary Baker Eddy, which was based on articles written by Wilbur for Human Life magazine. However, when he later became critical of Christian Science, he called the book unreliable. As part of his role in the church, he collected a significant amount of primary-source material about the church and Eddy. In 1909 he was named to the church's Board of Directors.

Dittemore was removed from his position as a Director over a dispute regarding the Trustees of the Christian Science Publishing Society. He had become increasingly bitter in the months of disagreement and opposed any effort by the Board of Directors to restore normal relations with the Trustees and to keep the church from being drawn into litigation with them. His bitterness was directed not only at the Trustees, but the other Directors, and, according to Norman Beasley, "his criticism was sharply personal, and openly contemptuous," leading to his dismissal in March 1919. He was replaced by Annie M. Knott, the first woman Director of the church. The resolution of dismissal also accused Dittemore of working independently and contrarily to the Board to exert personal control over the affairs of the church, violating multiple Manual by-laws, and acting in a threatening manner towards other members of the Board. In the same resolution he was told to "return to the Clerk of the Mother Church and Corresponding Secretary of [the] Board all letters, documents, papers, copies thereof, and other articles which he has taken or received as a member of this Board".

On April 29, 1919, about six weeks after his dismissal, Dittemore sued the church to be reinstated; and although he was not successful, litigation went on for some time. After failing twice in court, he set up his own organization which he later called an "opposition movement, opposed to the Cause of Christian Science, [and] to Mrs. Eddy and her teachings."

According to Dittemore in the preface to The Truth and the Tradition, he came to the view in 1928 that Eddy's work had borrowed heavily from the unpublished manuscripts of New England "mental healer" Phineas Parkhurst Quimby. He also said he was concerned with the alleged church boycott of Charles Scribner's Sons for publishing a critical biography of Eddy, Edwin Dakin's Mrs. Eddy: The Biography of a Virginal Mind (1929). Gill writes that the "alleged campaign... was... probably the single most important factor in assuring its long-term success" and Charles Scribner's Sons used it to advertise for the book, including ads like one in the Los Angeles Times saying that booksellers across America were returning Dakin's book under pressure, and further that it was a "situation almost incredible in a free country." Although the book was extremely successful, Gill write that its "wealth of factual errors" in addition to its commercial success, may have been motivating factors for Dittemore to write his own book.

=== Mary Baker Eddy: The Truth and the Tradition ===
In 1932, Dittemore wrote his own biography of Eddy and history of the church, Mary Baker Eddy: The Truth and the Tradition, with Ernest Sutherland Bates, a teacher of English and philosophy at Oberlin College; a collaborate suggested by Allen Johnson, Professor of American History at Yale University.

The book was largely based on the three trunks full of primary sources that Dittemore collected while working for the church, including 1,500 unpublished letters from Eddy; what he noted as "all the important part[s]" of the diary of Eddy's personal assistant Calvin Frye; the diary of James F. Gilman, who illustrated her work; letters from her brother and first two husbands; 500 letters from her students; and reminiscences from her close contacts. Gillian Gill writes that Dittemore, when he broke with the church, in addition to taking many documents acquired over the years by the church, gained access to Frye's rooms in the hours after his death and removed sections of his diary, which Dittemore transcribed, photographed, and then burned; although he included extracts in his book. He later sold some of the materials back to the church for $10,000, after first allowing Gilbert Carpenter, another biographer, to copy them for $400.

The work also makes use of two books that Dittemore says were suppressed by the church: Mrs. Eddy as I Knew Her in 1870 (1923) by Samuel Putnam Bancroft, a student of Eddy's, and Mrs. Eddy and the Late Suit in Equity (1908) by Michael Meehan. The latter is about a lawsuit in which Eddy was involved toward the end of her life, when her relatives sought unsuccessfully to have her declared unable to manage her affairs. Meehan was a journalist who wrote favorably of Eddy, and she initially approved the publication but later asked the author not to release it, although he ended up self-publishing it.

Historian Ralph Henry Gabriel wrote in 1933 that, because of the amount of primary-source material to which Dittemore had access, the book "comes very close to being a definitive history of a strangely paradoxical woman". Gill writes that by publishing previously unpublished material and correcting many of the inaccuracies in Milmine and Dakin's books, Bates and Dittemore "improves upon all earlier works and becomes invaluable source material for later biographers in its accounts of the last five or so years of Mrs. Eddy's life" in particular, although she notes there are still "factual inaccuracies" in the book. Later, the church bought the copyright and publisher's plates of the book from A. A. Knopf, but has never reissued it, leading to accusations of suppression.

=== Apology ===
On March 23, 1937, shortly before his death, Dittemore wrote a letter to the Board of Directors of the Mother Church expressing repentance for his actions:

Gentlemen:

As the result of experience over a period of years and a great deal of serious study devoted to the science of government, I have come to the humble conclusion that I made a great mistake in allowing personal differences of opinion and the feelings that developed therefrom, to influence me to the extent which they evidently did after Mrs. Eddy passed on.

We were all greatly affected by her demise and held divergent views regarding the policies to be pursued when she was no longer here to direct us. And while I acted upon convictions which I regarded as right at the time, I have since been led to see, and am anxious to go on record as admitting it, that I was wrong in letting personal opinion and matters of policy induce me to depart from Principle.

God's law does not divide and separate men; it unites them, enabling them to work together and perpetuates this unity. Personal differences that appear irreconcilable disappear as we grow in the understanding of His law and the ability to demonstrate it. Man is properly self-governed only as he enthrones this mighty law in his heart and mind. It annihilates everything unlike itself and I find it has destroyed all sense of personal animosity, all desire to justify self, and brought instead the sincere desire to acknowledge my mistake in organizing what was naturally regarded as an opposition movement, opposed to the Cause of Christian Science, to Mrs. Eddy and her teachings.

I recognize and revere her as having restored to humanity primitive Christian healing and acknowledge The First Church of Christ, Scientist, in Boston, Mass., as the first church in history to stand for the spiritual and the scientific significance of the life of Christ.

I am happy to forward you this letter to use as you may see fit and to sincerely announce as my fervent desire that the Cause which you represent may continue to grow and prosper under your direction.

Yours in Truth,

John V. Dittemore.

== Personal life ==
Dittemore married Edith L. Bingham in 1898, who later divorced him. He was survived by his one daughter, Louise, and a grandson.

== Works ==
- Dittemore, John V. (1925). The Evolution of Christian Science: A Brief Summary of Its Historical Development, Contemporary Attainments, and Future Destiny. Boston: Christian Science Publishing Society.
- Bates, Ernest Sutherland and Dittemore, John V. (1932). Mary Baker Eddy: The Truth and the Tradition. New York: A. A. Knopf (London: George Routledge & Sons, 1933).
