= Rosa Meador Goodrich Boido =

American physician

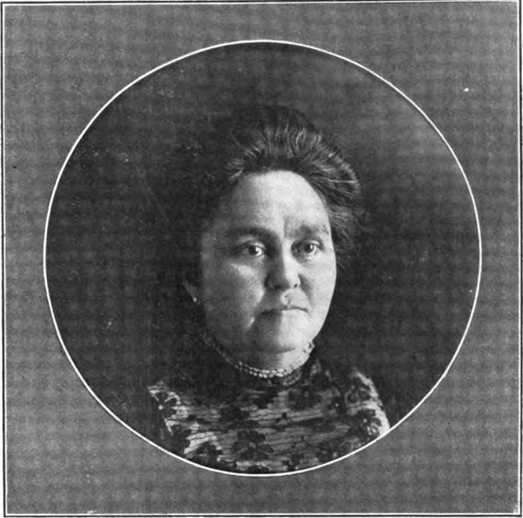
- Rosa Goodrich Boido, from a 1913 publication
- Born: Rosa Meador Goodrich; February 24, 1870; Navasota, Texas
- Died: October 27, 1959 (aged 89); Kauai, Hawaii
- Occupations: Physician, suffragist, temperance worker

Rosa Meador Goodrich Boido (February 24, 1870 – October 27, 1959) was an American physician, suffragist, and temperance worker. She was the first woman to hold a medical license in Arizona.

== Early life ==
Rosa Meador Goodrich was born in Navasota, Texas, the daughter of Briggs Goodrich and Rosa Meador Goodrich. Her father fatally stabbed her mother when Rosa was a baby, and she was raised mainly by her paternal grandmother, Serena Corrothers Goodrich. Her father, who remarried, went on to serve as attorney general of Arizona Territory in the 1880s. She attended Pacific Methodist College in Santa Rosa, California, and earned a medical degree at Cooper Medical College in 1895. Her thesis was titled "Inaugural thesis on the practise of medicine and surgery in Guatemala, Central America".

== Career ==
Boido and her husband practiced medicine in Guatemala, El Salvador, Honduras, and Mexico after earning their degrees in California. In 1899 they homesteaded in Arizona. She was the first woman and the fifth person to earn a medical license in Arizona, and the first licensed physician in Tucson. Her practice in Tucson was damaged by fire in 1903. The Boidos moved to Phoenix in 1911, and opened the Twilight Sleep Hospital, specializing in obstetrics and gyneocology, but also offering general clinical services.

Boido was active in the Woman's Christian Temperance Union of Arizona, and served as a delegate to the 1892 convention of the California Prohibitionist Party. She was president of the Pima County Suffrage Club, and worked for national suffrage rights after Arizona's women gained the ballot in 1912. She was vice-president of the Phoenix Civic League, ran for a seat on the Phoenix School Board in 1912, helped to establish the Phoenix Social Service League in 1914, and worked to end the death penalty in Arizona.

In 1918 Boido was charged with performing an abortion at the Twilight Sleep Hospital, and found guilty; she served two months in prison, and lost her medical license. By then her husband, facing his own legal problems, returned to his native Mexico. Boido moved to California to live with her daughter, Rosalind Goodrich Bates, and grandsons.

== Personal life ==
Goodrich married fellow medical student Norberto Lorenzo Boido Bazosabal in December 1893. They had two children, Rosalind Goodrich Bates and Lorenzo Boido Jr. They later divorced. She died in 1959, aged 89 years, at her grandson Vernon Boido's home in Kauai, Hawaii. There is an engraved paver in Boido's honor, in the Women's Plaza at the University of Arizona.
