= Mary Baker Eddy: The Truth and the Tradition =

- Title page for Mary Baker Eddy: The Truth and the Tradition (1932)
- Author: Ernest Sutherland Bates and John V. Dittemore
- Language: English
- Subject: Mary Baker Eddy and The First Church of Christ, Scientist
- Genre: Non-fiction, Biography
- Publisher: New York: A. A. Knopf, 1932.; London: George Routledge & Sons, 1933.
- Publication place: United States
- Pages: 476
- OCLC: 1199769

Mary Baker Eddy: The Truth and the Tradition (1932) is a biography of Mary Baker Eddy by Ernest Sutherland Bates, an American academic, and John V. Dittemore, a former director of The First Church of Christ, Scientist.

== Content ==
Based on several trunks' worth of primary-source material to which Dittemore had access, the book is a detailed account of the life and work of Mary Baker Eddy, the founder of The First Church of Christ, Scientist. It was first published in New York by A. A. Knopf. Reviewing the book in 1933, Richard H. Shryock wrote: "Step by step, critically, inexorably, the authors complete the case against this greatest of modern 'health-cultists'. Their very restraint makes it the more terrible." According to Gillian Gill, the book was heavily influenced by Georgine Milmine's The Life of Mary Baker G. Eddy and the History of Christian Science, while at the same time publishing a significant amount of previously unpublished material. Gill writes that while the book corrects many of the inaccuracies in Milmine and Edwin Franden Dakin's biographies of Eddy, particularly that of Dakin's, and became "invaluable source material for later biographers", she also notes there are still "factual inaccuracies" in the Bates and Dittemore's book.

Later, the church bought the copyright and publisher's plates of the book from A. A. Knopf, but has never reissued it, leading to accusations of suppression.
