= Rosalind Goodrich Bates =

American lawyer (1894–1961)

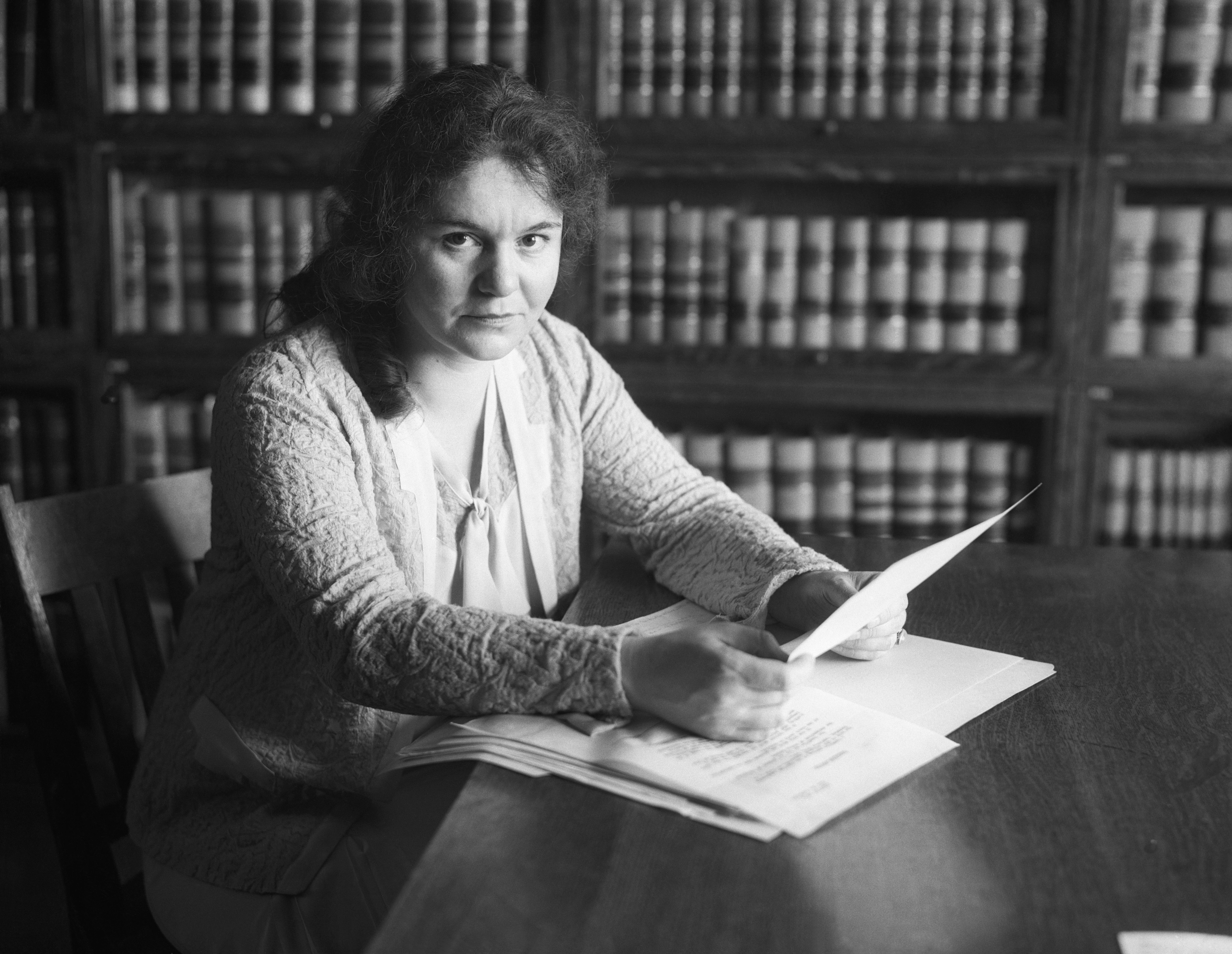
- Bates in c. 1931
- Born: Rosalind Anita Goodrich Boido; July 29, 1894; Sonsonate, El Salvador
- Died: November 14, 1961 (aged 67); Los Angeles, California, US
- Other names: Rosalind Boido, Rosalind Blades
- Occupation: Lawyer
- Spouse: Ernest Sutherland Bates

Rosalind Anita Goodrich Boido (July 29, 1894 – November 14, 1961) was an American lawyer and clubwoman, based in Los Angeles, California. She was a trial attorney who practiced international law and served as a Judge Pro Tem (temporary position as a judge) in the Los Angeles Superior Court. She was a founder and president of the International Federation of Women Lawyers (FIDA).

== Early life and education ==
Rosalind Anita Goodrich Boido was born in 1894, in Sonsonate, El Salvador, the daughter of Norberto Lorenzo Boido Basozabal and Rosa Meador Goodrich Boido. Her father was born in Mexico and her mother was from Texas. Both parents were physicians; her mother was also active as a suffragist and temperance worker in Arizona.

Rosalind Goodrich attended the University of Arizona, and graduated from the University of Oregon, where she earned a bachelor's degree in 1917 and a master's degree in 1918. She earned a law degree from Southwestern Law School in Los Angeles and passed the California bar in 1926, and was one of the first Latina lawyers in the United States. Certain sources identify Bates as the first licensed Latina lawyer in California. Despite her heritage, though, Bates did not self-identify as Mexican American or Latina during her lifetime.

== Career ==
After early work as an editor and actress in New York, Bates was a trial lawyer in Los Angeles. She was president of the California Business Women's Council, and also of the Los Angeles Business Women's Council, and active in the Los Angeles Women's Club. She was vice-president of the Los Angeles Lawyers Club and headed the international department of the Women's University Club.

She was a member of the California and Mexican Bar Associations.

"Every woman lawyer who actually earns her living in the practice of law is an exceptional woman," she declared in 1932. "To survive the hard grind of study, and the worst grind of private practice or the demands of public office, requires good health, good brains, and most important, good luck."

=== FIDA ===
Bates was an officer of the National Association of Women Lawyers, and organized the group's national gatherings in Los Angeles in 1935 and 1939. In 1944 she was a founder of the International Federation of Women Lawyers (FIDA). As FIDA's founder, she was the United States representative to the 1944 convening meeting in Mexico City. She was later elected the president of FIDA in 1949.

=== Editor ===
Women Lawyers Journal. Bates was the editor of the journal. (1931; 1935-1936)

She served as the editor (1931; 1935-1936) and wrote essays for the Women Lawyers Journal. For the Fall 1957 issue of the Women Lawyers Journal that chronicled the association's "New York-London Convention", Bates even assisted then-editor Eva M. Mack (who worked as an attorney for Hugh Ellwood Macbeth Sr.) to preserve the historical event. She was also editor for La Abogada (The Female Lawyer) and Lawyers' Club Docket.

=== Role in government ===
In 1952, she testified before the President's Commission on Naturalization and Immigration, on the subject of adoption, immigration, and citizenship procedures for Japanese-American "war babies". She ran unsuccessfully for a seat on the Los Angeles Board of Education in 1953.

=== Association offices held ===
She was the first woman to serve on the board of directors of the Southwestern Alumni Association. Along with having been president of FIDA, she also served as president of the California Business Women's Council and the Los Angeles Business Women's Council. As a member of the National Association of Women Lawyers (NAWL), she was on the Executive Board as the delegate from California, and was chair of the organization's annual convention.

== Publications ==
- Loyalty and the Woman Lawyer. (1931-1932)
- History of Western Women Lawyers. (1931-1932)
- How Mexico is Meeting Rehabilitation Problem - Penal Institutions Praised - Courts Efficient. (1935-1936)
- Comparative Legal Rights of Women in the Americas. (1948)
- Forum on Divorce Problems from the 36th Annual Convention (1935-1936)

== Personal life ==
Rosalind Goodrich married writer and editor Ernest Sutherland Bates in 1913. They had two sons, Roland and Vernon, before they divorced in 1919. She married her college drama co-star, blind writer Leslie Burton Blades, in 1919; they divorced in 1923. Her son Roland, her law partner, died in 1958, and her mother died in 1959.

== Death ==
Rosalind Goodrich Bates died in 1961, aged 67 years, shot to death at her home in Silver Lake. One suspect was a man involved in a custody battle with one of Bates' clients; he was arrested but later cleared. Her murder remains unsolved.
