= Ernest Sutherland Bates =

American scholar (1879–1939)

Ernest S. Bates
- Born: 14 October 1879; Gambier, Ohio
- Died: 4 December 1939 (aged 60)
- Education: A.B., A.M. University of Michigan, PhD Columbia University (1908)
- Occupations: Academic, writer
- Employer(s): Oberlin College, University of Arizona, University of Oregon, Saturday Review of Literature
- Notable work: Mary Baker Eddy: The Truth and the Tradition
- Spouse: Rosalind Goodrich Bates (m. 1914; div. 1919)
- Children: 2

Ernest Sutherland Bates (14 October 1879 – 4 December 1939) was an American academic and writer. He taught English and philosophy at Oberlin College from 1903 to 1905, the University of Arizona until 1915, and the University of Oregon from then until 1925.

== Early life and education ==
Bates was born in Gambier, Ohio, to Cyrus Sutherland and his wife, Lavern Bates. He obtained his A.B. and master's from the University of Michigan, and his Ph.D. in 1908 from Columbia University.

== Biography ==
Bates taught English and philosophy at Oberlin College from 1903 to 1905, the University of Arizona until 1915, and the University of Oregon from then until 1925. After Oregon he became literary editor of the Dictionary of American Biography. He was also associate editor of Modern Monthly and a contributor to the Saturday Review of Literature.

Bates was the co-author, with John V. Dittemore, a former director of the Christian Science church, of Mary Baker Eddy: The Truth and the Tradition (1932), which traces the early history of Christian Science and the life of its founder, Mary Baker Eddy (1821–1910). The book has been praised for its use of original sources, such as manuscript collections of fifteen hundred Eddy letters and hundreds of letters from her students.

== Personal life ==
Bates was married to lawyer and activist Rosalind Goodrich Bates in 1914; they had two sons before they divorced in 1919. He died in 1939, aged 60 years.

== Bibliography ==
- American Faith: Its Religious, Political, and Economic Foundations (1940)
- The Story of the Supreme Court (1936)
- The Story of Congress, 1789–1935 (1936)
- with John V. Dittemore, Mary Baker Eddy: The Truth and the Tradition (1932)
- (ed.), The Bible: Designed to be Read as Living Literature (1936)
- Life of the Bible (The Biography of the Bible)
- (ed.), Pocket Bible
- The Four Gospels
- Hearst, Lord of San Simeon (co-author) (1936)
- This Land of Liberty (1930)
- The Pageant of the States
- The Friend of Jesus (1925; poetry, published in the UK as The Gospel According to Judas)
