= Samuel Putnam Bancroft =

Christian Scientist

- Born: July 19, 1846
- Died: October 11, 1929 (aged 83); United States
- Other names: Putney Bancroft, Samuel P. Bancroft, S. P. Bancroft
- Notable work: Mrs. Eddy as I Knew Her in 1870

Samuel Putnam Bancroft (July 19, 1846 - October 11, 1929) was an American Christian Scientist and an early student of Mary Baker Eddy, the founder of The First Church of Christ, Scientist. In 1923 he wrote a memoir of his time with her entitled Mrs. Eddy as I Knew Her in 1870.

== Biography ==
As a young man Bancroft, who went by Putney, worked as a shoe operative for Bancroft & Purington in Lynn, Massachusetts. The factory was part-owned by his uncle Thomas Frederick Bancroft. In 1870 he became interested in Christian Science after hearing about it from Daniel Spofford, an early student of Mary Baker Eddy's. Bancroft then studied under Eddy herself. He paid $300 for the instruction, but Eddy promised to refund him if he could not "demonstrate" what she taught. His uncle, a deacon of the First Congregational Church, was not supportive of his association with Eddy and once commented "My boy, you will be ruined for life; it is the work of the devil."

For a short period, Bancroft tried unsuccessfully to establish his own practice in Cambridge, Massachusetts during 1874-1875. Bancroft advertised himself as a "Scientific Physician, Gives no Medicine." Bancroft was generally loyal to Eddy, but she had to warn him against idolizing her, telling him not to "make a Dagon of me" referring to the Philistine idol from the Bible. Bancroft helped Eddy organize the Christian Science Association in 1876 and the Massachusetts Metaphysical College in 1881. He wrote of Eddy, "[she] showed to her early pupils the loving-kindness of a mother, or the faithful devotion of a sister." However, he eventually became inactive in the Christian Science movement.

In 1923, Bancroft wrote and privately published the book Mrs. Eddy as I Knew Her in 1870, which focused on the period between 1870 and 1875 when Eddy was writing Science and Health. The book was never officially endorsed by the church, but is still read by some Christian Scientists today, and is sold independently. There have been some claims that it was suppressed by the church; however, the Mary Baker Eddy Library, which is owned by the church, calls it "one of the most important reminiscences of Eddy's early years as a practitioner and teacher of Christian Science."

== Publications ==
- Mrs. Eddy as I Knew Her in 1870 (Boston: Geo. H. Ellis Press, 1923)
