= Josephus Flavius Cook =

American philosopher

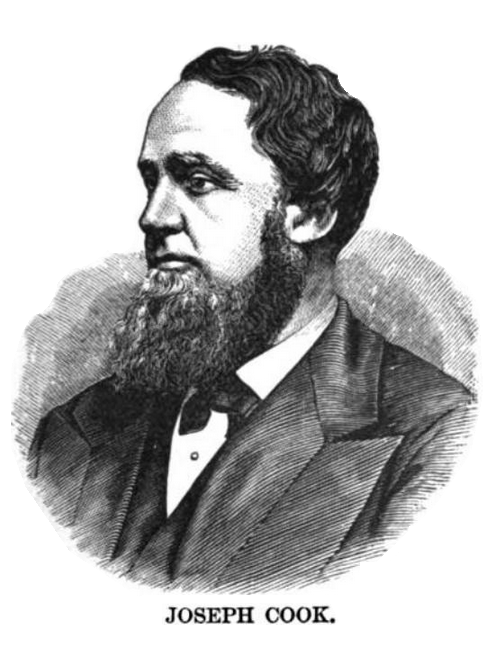
Josephus Flavius Cook

Josephus Flavius Cook (January 26, 1838 – June 24, 1901), commonly known as Joseph Cook, was an American philosophical lecturer, clergyman, and writer.

== Life and career ==
Born in Ticonderoga, New York, he attended Phillips Academy, and then entered Yale College, later transferring to Harvard College, from which he graduated in 1865. He married Georgiana Hemingway on June 30, 1877.

A descendant of Pilgrims, Cook started his ascent to fame by way of Monday noon prayer meetings in Tremont Temple in Boston that for more than twenty years were among the city's greatest attractions. In the lectures, Cook attempted to convey recent developments in European science and philosophy in a way that reconciled them to Protestant belief; his commentary stressed social amelioration and civic responsibility. He later travelled the world; his lectures were published and translated into several languages.

In 1871, Cook's work exposing the poor conditions in factories in Lynn, Massachusetts was publicly praised by Mary Baker Eddy, the founder of The First Church of Christ, Scientist, however, Cook later became a noted critic of Eddy and her ideas. Eddy responded with a pamphlet, later expanded into the book No and Yes which opposed Cook's views on the subject. Eddy also spoke at one of Cook's Tremont Temple lectures in defense of Christian Science. Stephen Gottschalk identified the speech as a key moment in the history of the church.

Cook died at his summer home in Ticonderoga, New York on June 24, 1901.

== Selected works ==
- Cook, Joseph (1878). Transcendentalism, with Preludes on Current Events. London: Dickinson.
