= Next Friends suit =

1907 lawsuit

The Next Friends suit
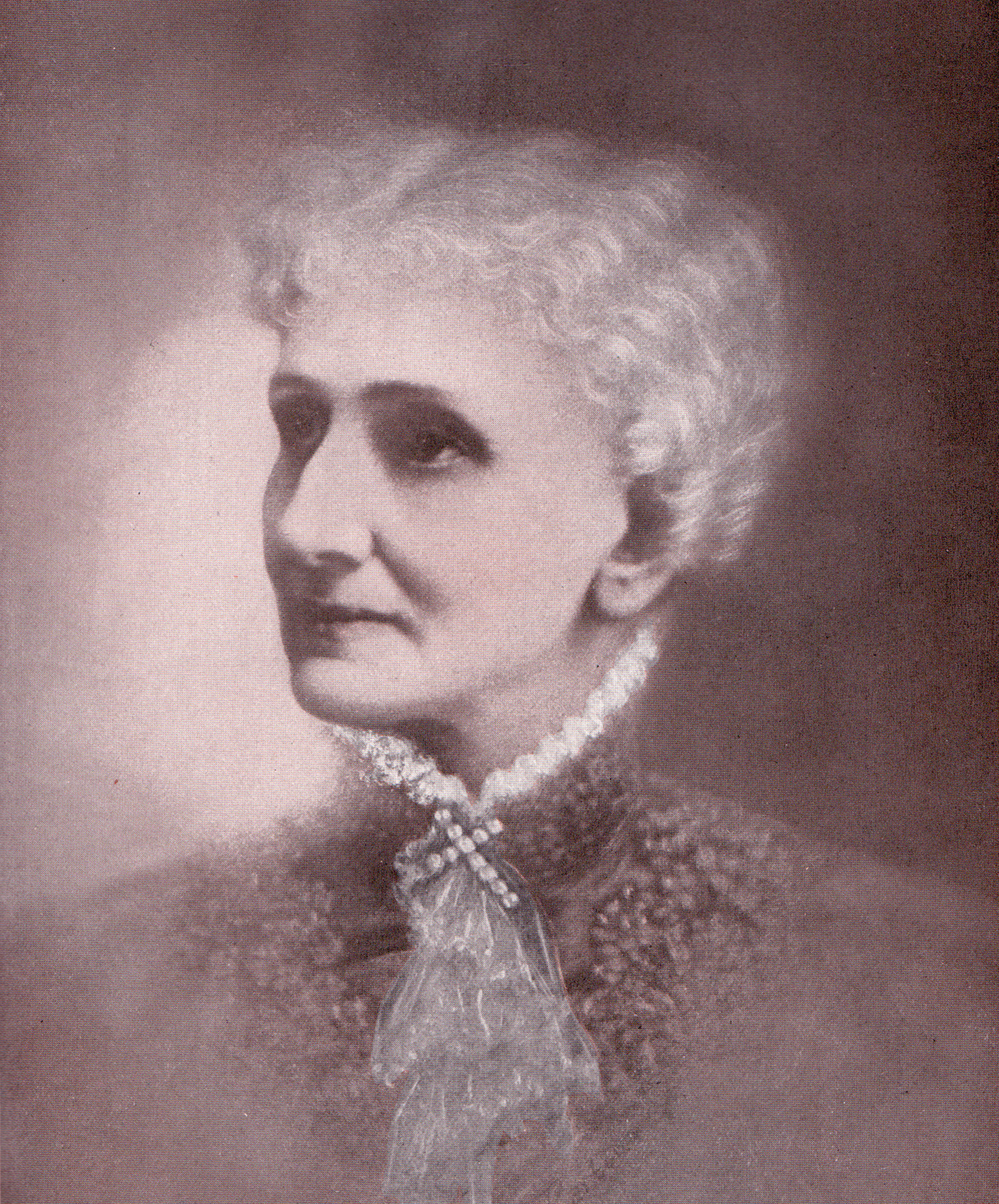
- Mary Baker Eddy, the subject of the trial
- Court: Superior Court of the State of New Hampshire
- Decided: 1907

Court membership
- Judge sitting: Robert N. Chamberlin

The "Next Friends" suit of 1907 was a lawsuit instigated by the New York World regarding Mary Baker Eddy, a religious leader from New England.

The suit was an early example of "trial by media", and became one of the largest media spectacles of the first few years of the twentieth century, with at least 2,800 articles written by various newspapers. William Upton wrote that the tactics used "foreshadowed the more public litigation style that became commonplace toward the end of the century." The suit is also credited as one of the major influences in Eddy's decision the following year to create The Christian Science Monitor.

== Background ==
=== Mary Baker Eddy ===
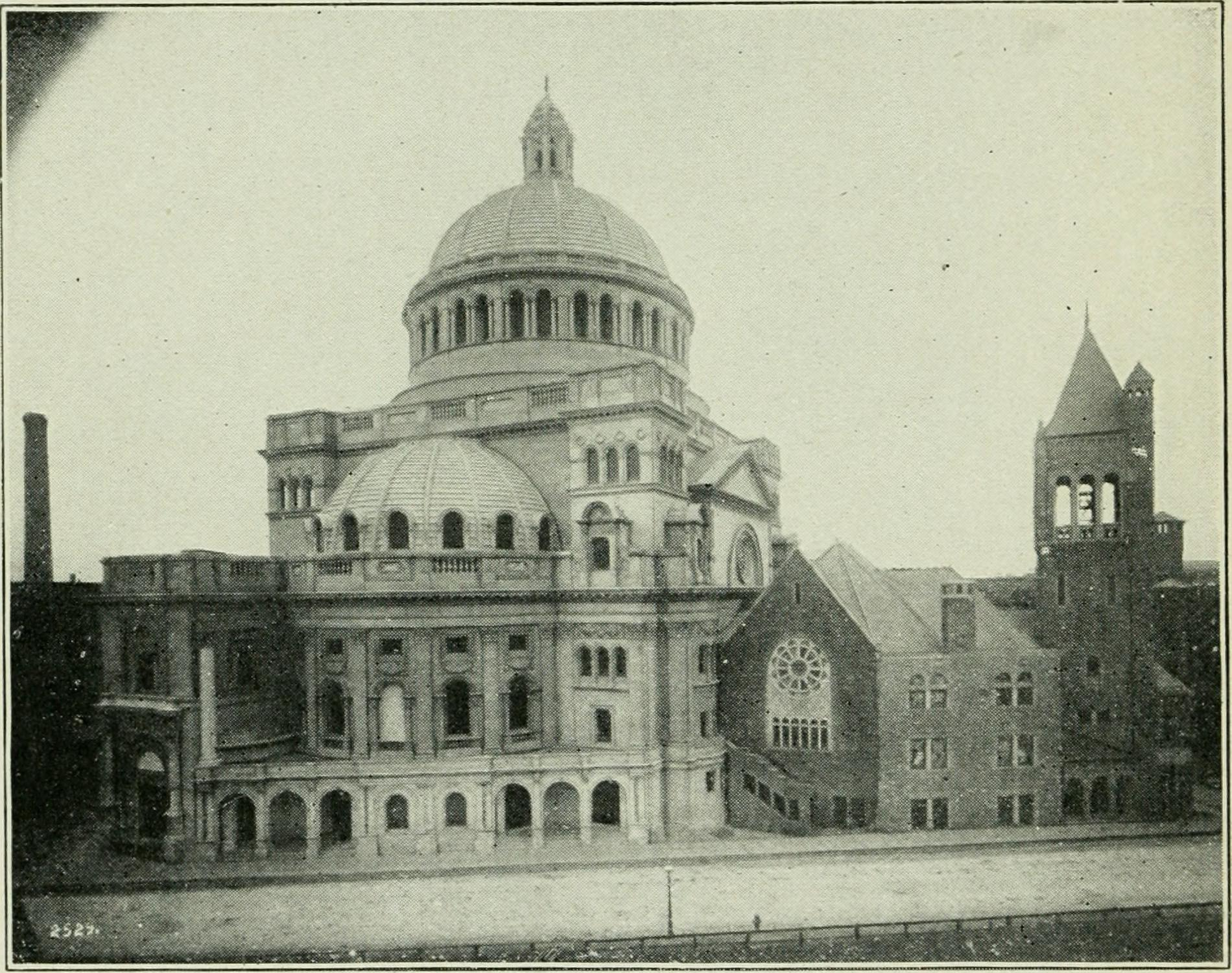
The First Church of Christ, Scientist, the domed extension of which (left) was completed and dedicated in 1906.

Mary Baker Eddy (1821–1910) was an American religious leader and author. According to Susan Bridge, Eddy "sought to return to the unadorned principles of earliest Christianity" including "Jesus' practice as reported in the New Testament of healing the sick." In 1879, Eddy founded the Church of Christ, Scientist, with 15 students in Lynn, Massachusetts. She became an influential but controversial figure, and was often attacked in the press. Despite this, the religion was growing rapidly by the early 1900s, and at one point was said to be opening churches at a rate of one every four days. Both the fast growth of the newly formed church, and the church's founder, were common topics in newspapers of the day. The completion of the large domed extension to The First Church of Christ, Scientist, in Boston and the dedication services on Sunday, June 10, 1906, were national news stories; and thirty thousand Christian Scientists came to Boston to attend its six consecutive dedication services, although Eddy herself did not attend the event.

Since at least as early as 1899, there were press reports that Eddy had died, and biographer Gillian Gill writes that "proving that she was alive was one of the strangest tasks [she] faced in her last twenty-five years of life." (Note: Eddy's son George W. Glover wrote to a Chicago paper on June 26, 1899, asking they contradict the false statement they had made saying that Eddy had "long been dead and that an imposter trained to represent her was living in conspicuous seclusion in Concord, New Hampshire.") The problem was compounded as Eddy, who was 86 years old by 1906, retreated from public life to her home at Pleasant View in Concord, New Hampshire, rarely leaving except for her daily drives around town. In response to questions, she wrote in the Christian Science Sentinel telling her followers not to cling to her personality, and that she had left Boston "to retreat from the world" and seek God. However, the increasing restrictions as to who had access to Eddy fueled conspiracy theories even among Christian Scientists that she was under the control of a "cabal" at the church headquarters in Boston or at Pleasant View, and rumors arose regarding her health. Despite this, she was still actively writing and was involved in church business, communicating with church officials in Boston through messengers who traveled on several daily trains which ran between Concord and Boston. According to Stephen Gottschalk, Eddy was "dubious" of the value of publicity and disliked it; and Gillian Gill writes that Eddy's message to the church on the dedication shows that she was worried "that prosperity might prove more dangerous for her movement than adversity."

=== Initial New York World article ===
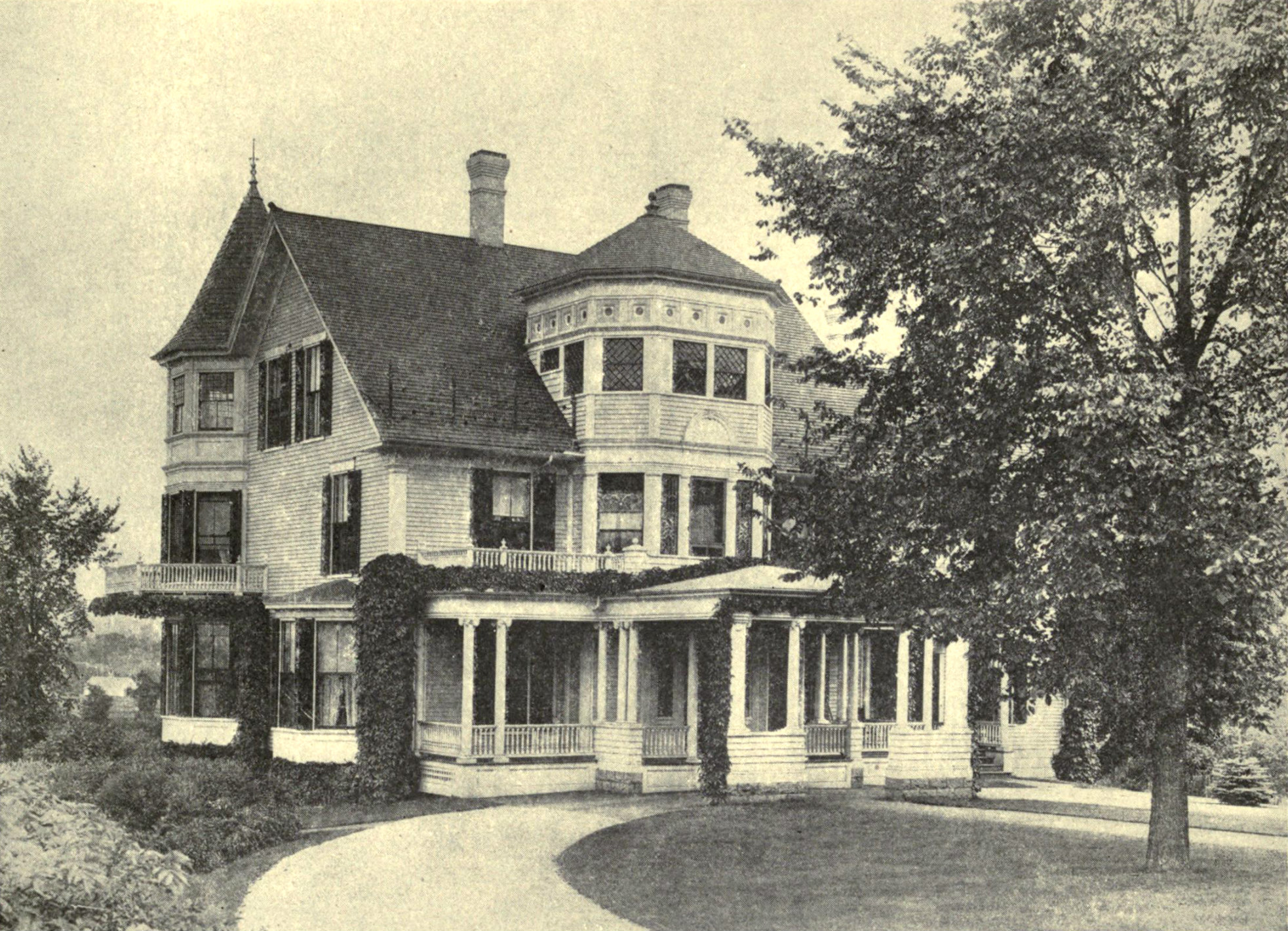
Pleasant View

In 1906, Joseph Pulitzer, who likely was aware of Eddy's failure to attend the dedication services of her church, sent two reporters from the New York World to where Eddy lived in Concord, New Hampshire, and they spent much of that summer digging into rumors and working with the team from McClure's Magazine, who were also investigating rumors around Eddy at the same time. On October 14, the World's reporters came to Eddy's home and told her secretary Calvin Frye that they had heard that Eddy was dead or incapacitated, and demanded to see her for themselves. Frye agreed to arrange an appointment with Eddy the next day, and the reporters brought a neighbor who had known Eddy earlier in her life and could identify her. Eddy met with the three of them for a short time, and after the meeting, the neighbor wrote in a letter that the woman who they met with was definitely her and not an imposter. The reporters did not imminently leave Concord however, and at one point accosted Eddy on her daily ride, jumping up on either side of the carriage to see her face.

On October 28, the World published a story under the heading "MRS. MARY BAKER G. EDDY DYING: FOOTMAN AND 'DUMMY' CONTROL HER: Founder of X Science Suffering from Cancer and Nearing Her End, Is Immured at Pleasant View, While Another Woman Impersonates Her in the Streets of Concord." Gillian Gill writes that the World "was read for sensation, not accuracy, but even by the paper's own standards the claims made in this article on Mary Baker Eddy were extreme." Caroline Fraser called the article "outrageously speculative and wildly inaccurate". The story described Eddy as being barely able to stand, speak, or make any sense; it described her as looking "more dead than alive. She was a skeleton, her hollow cheeks thick with red paint, and the fleshless, hairless bones above the sunken eyes penciled a jet black. The features were thick with powder... Her weakness was pathetic. She reeled as she stood clinging to the table. Her sunken, faded eyes gazed helplessly, almost pleadingly, at her visitors..."

The condemnation of The World's article, especially in Concord, where Eddy lived and was seen daily, was significant. Despite Eddy's relative seclusion, a number of Concord citizens had access to her; Gill writes that this ranged from "odd-job gardeners and painters,... to local editors and bank managers" who had no connection to Christian Science. Gill continues that: "To these people, the idea that someone was impersonating [Eddy] and that she was a helpless, dying pawn was not merely ludicrous but offensive." This included two of Eddy's cousins, Fred Ladd and Henry Moore Baker, notable Concord citizens who were not Christian Scientists, and who would have been more concerned with Eddy's well being than the church's. After the article, the Mayor of Concord, Charles R. Corning, went to meet with Eddy, and afterwards gave a lengthy interview in the Boston Herald, saying: "I had gone expecting to find a tottering old woman, perhaps incoherent, almost senile. Instead, when she rose to greet me, her carriage was almost erect, her walk that of a woman of forty. I have seen many old ladies, but never one with the vigorous personality of Mrs. Mary Baker G. Eddy. ... We talked with her for half an hour, and at the end of that time, when she rose to bid us good-by, Mrs. Eddy showed no sign of fatigue."

== Lawsuit ==
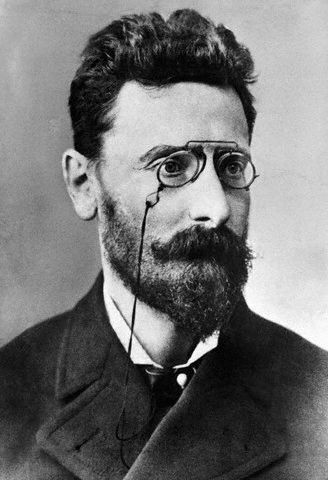
Joseph Pulitzer

=== Involvement of the New York World ===
Although it is clear the New York World instigated, organized, financially backed, and promoted the suit; their motivations are less clear, and it was likely a mix of reasons. One major motivation was likely selling newspapers, and although the suit was eventually unsuccessful, the media circus which it created was indeed good for business. Amy Voorhees writes that the World "hoped to capitalize on the mixture of notoriety, popularity, confusion, controversy, and sheer name recognition by then surrounding Eddy and her new sect." When asked by journalist Arthur Brisbane why she thought the suit had been brought, Eddy replied: "Greed of gold, young man. They are not interested in me, I am sorry to say, but in my money, and in the desire to control that. They say they want to help me. They never tried to help me when I was working hard years ago and when help would have been so welcome." She also alleged sexism, saying: "If I were a man, they would not treat me so."

Another possibly motivation was professional rivalry, and Charles S. Braden called the suit a "controversy between rival newspapers". William Randolph Hearst, the main rival of Joseph Pulitzer, was apparently friendly towards Christian Science, which may have influenced Pulitzer's desire to attack the religion and its founder; as the claim of Eddy's insanity was an implicit attack against the religion she founded. Gillian Gill felt that Pulitzer, who certainly believed his own journalists' report over the backlash in Concord, also believed that newspapers alone were not up to the task, and that "force of law was needed" to remove Eddy from the supposed cabal led by Frye. In addition, rumors that McClure's Magazine was working on a long-form critical biography of Eddy were circulating in the press world by late 1904, and Pulitzer would likely not have liked S. S. McClure getting all the credit for "stemming the tide" of Christian Science.

=== The lawsuit is declared ===
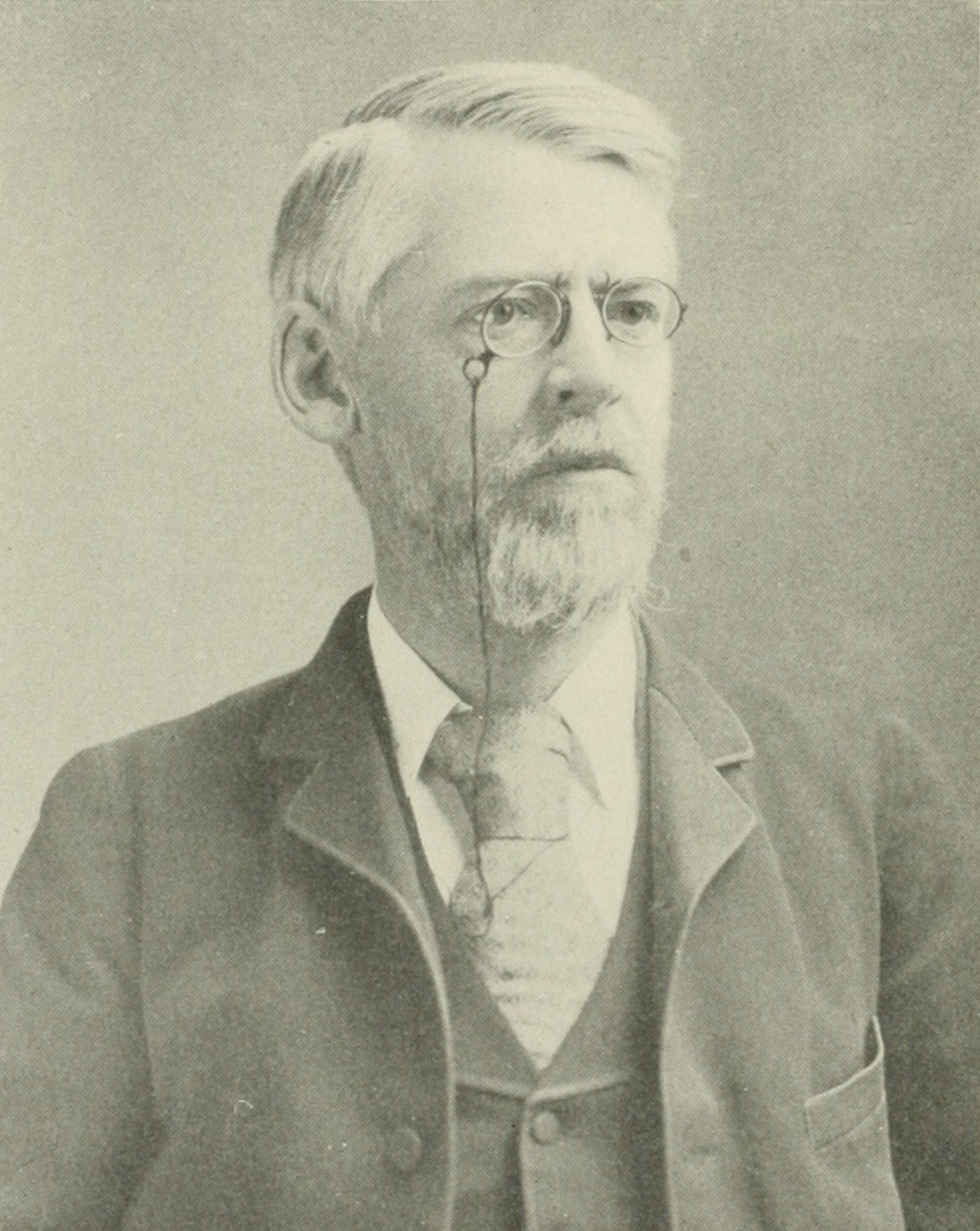
William E. Chandler

The World began by hiring as counsel William E. Chandler, a prominent lawyer and former US senator from New Hampshire who was living in Washington but was born in Concord and considered it his home. (Note: The World was in touch with Chandler at least as early as October or November of 1906, possibly before the first article actually appeared in print.) Chandler was not friendly towards Eddy or Christian Science, and was eager to bring legal challenge against her. Since the World did not have legal standing to bring a lawsuit, they sought out those who did: namely family members who would have the standing to instigate legal action supposedly on Eddy's behalf. The World tracked down Eddy's son George Washington Glover II in South Dakota and told him that his mother was mentally incompetent to manage her affairs, and that she was under the control of her advisors. They further convinced him to bring a lawsuit against the advisors in order to gain control of Eddy's estate and fortune, and offered to pay the legal bills. Later other relatives would join in as well.

On March 1, 1907, the suit was brought supposedly on behalf of Eddy by her "next friends" George W. Glover, Mary Baker Glover, and George W. Baker; Eddy's son, granddaughter, and nephew respectively. Eddy's estranged adopted son Ebenezer Foster Eddy joined the suit on March 11 along with Fred W. Baker, another relative. The defendants were Calvin A. Frye, Alfred Farlow, Irving C. Tomlinson, Ira O. Knapp, William B. Johnson, Stephen A. Chase, Joseph Armstrong, Edward A. Kimball, Hermann S. Hering, and Lewis C. Strang. Frye, Tomlinson, and Strang worked as secretaries in Eddy's household at Pleasant View; Farlow was the general manager of the committee on publication for the church, and had served as the church's president in 1904; Knapp, Johnson, Chase, and Armstrong were on the Christian Science Board of Directors; Kimball was a prominent Christian Scientist in Chicago; and Hering had been First Reader at the Mother Church from 1902 to 1905, served as the church's president in 1905, and at the time of the suit was serving as First Reader of the Christian Science church in Concord were Eddy lived.

The suit claimed that Eddy was "in the custody" of Strang and Frye and that no one was allowed to see her, and that her property was being administered "either in her name by others or by her while unfitted for the transaction thereof." It furthermore went into detail regarding her publications, copyrights, and estimated royalties and earnings; and asked for a receiver to take over her property until the court could reach a verdict. Had the suit been successful, it would have placed Eddy and her property under the legal guardianship of the next friends and permanently removed her personal and financial autonomy.

Eddy meanwhile employed Frank S. Streeter as her counsel, one of the foremost lawyers in New Hampshire and someone she had worked with before. Streeter also had a history with William Chandler. Streeter's biggest client was the Boston and Maine Railroad, and when Chandler had sought to expand regulations on railroads, Streeter worked for the company to successfully engender Chandler's defeat in the 1901 United States Senate primary election. (Note: Mary Baker Eddy's cousin Henry Moore Baker also ran in the 1901 election, but did not win.) It is possible that in addition to Chandler's hatred of Eddy and her religion, he also wanted revenge against Frank Streeter for this defeat.

=== Signing the deed of trust ===
On March 6, Eddy summoned her lawyer Frank Streeter and a number of others to her house and signed a deed of trust which she had been planning since February, handing her personal property over to three trustees: her cousin Henry Moore Baker, Christian Science Board of Directors member Archibald McLellan, and banker Josiah Fernald. Chandler's team was immediately convinced Eddy and Streeter had made a huge mistake, as signing her property over to trustees seemed to confirm what they had been saying regarding her being controlled by others. However, since Chandler had been arguing that Eddy suffered from long-term insanity and legal incompetence, the deed of trust worked in Eddy's favor as Streeter was able to convince the court to confine the trial to the question: was Eddy sane when she had signed the deed of trust on March 6? If she was sane and competent then, that would establish whether she was able to manager her affairs.

=== The Masters interview ===
Judge Robert N. Chamberlain appointed three masters to answer the question of legal competency: Judge Edgar Aldrich, Dr. George E. Jelly, and New Hampshire attorney Hosea W. Parker. The appointment of the alienist Dr. Jelly especially satisfied Chandler's team, as they were sure he would side with them. Because of Eddy's age, the court decided to send the delegation to her home instead of bringing her to court. The masters, along with Chandler and Streeter, met at Eddy's home on August 15. The interview became a turning point of the case, as Eddy answered questions regarding her finances and investments, as well as giving an explanation of how she came to develop the teachings of Christian Science.

After the interview, the suit collapsed, and Chandler filed to have the case dismissed. Streeter asked the court not to allow the dismissal, but to give an official ruling in order to completely clear Eddy and the ten men who were accused of controlling her of all charges. Chamberlin allowed the suit to be dismissed however; but he did not allow a number of follow-up motions filed by Chandler, including one to make Eddy responsible for the costs of the suit.

== Aftermath ==
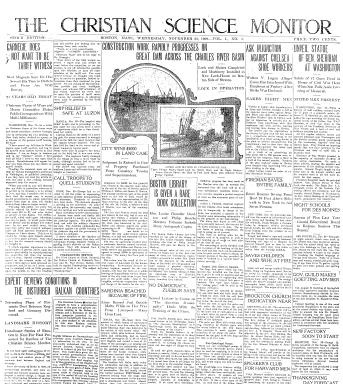
The first issue of The Christian Science Monitor

The suit was an example of "the relatively new phenomena of trial-by-media". According to scholar Amy Voorhees, "the Next Friends suit could be considered the largest national media spectacle at the opening of the twentieth century", with at least 2,800 articles written by various newspapers. And according to William Upton, "The case was remarkable, not simply for the conflict between these capable antagonists [Chandler and Streeter], but also because the tactics foreshadowed the more public litigation style that became commonplace toward the end of the century." Stephen Gottschalk later wrote that the suit was "the culminating crisis of [Eddy's] life" and "a pivotal moment in the history of the movement she led".

After the collapse of the suit, newspapers around the country voiced support for the court's decision. When the Masters found Eddy sane and competent, public opinion shifted "briefly but dramatically" in her favor. The New York American wrote: "The assertion that Mrs. Eddy, old and doddering, had fallen into the hands of designing men and women who sought to use her to further their own purposes, is thus proved to be as baseless as the numerous reports of her death which have been made from time to time by enemies of her religion."

The suit is credited as one of the major influences in Eddy's decision the following year to create The Christian Science Monitor. In 1908, Eddy began corresponding with the Christian Science Board of Directors, and soon after with the Board of Trustees of the Christian Science Publishing Society, about her plans for a daily newspaper, the first issue of which was published in November of that year.
