= Sibyl Marvin Huse =

American author and religious leader (1866–1939)

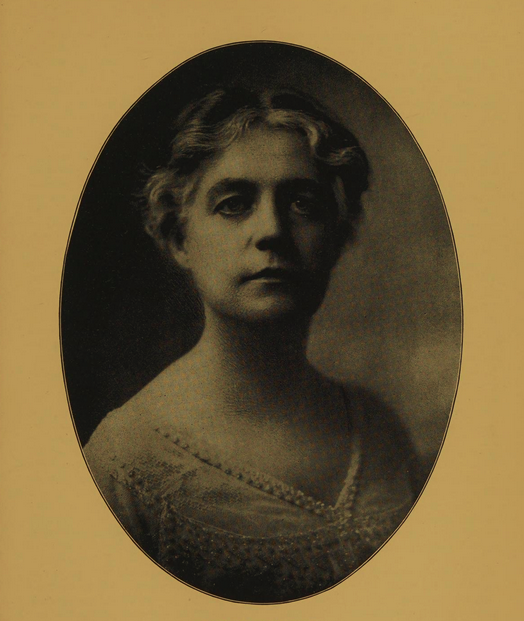
- Born: March 2, 1866; Paris, France
- Died: April 5, 1939 (aged 73); Plainfield, New Jersey, U.S.
- Occupations: Author; Teacher; Reader
- Writing career
- Genre: Metaphysics
- Subject: Christian Science

Signature
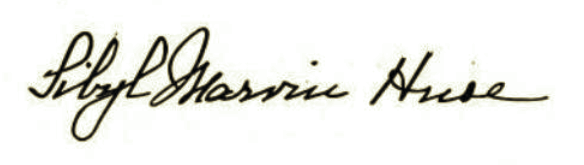

Sibyl Marvin Huse (March 2, 1866 – April 5, 1939) was a French-born American author of religious books and teacher of Christian Science. Huse holds a prominent place in the Christian Science movement and has a large clientele of devoted students who testify to her spiritual understanding and clear teaching of the beliefs as promulgated by Mary Baker Eddy. Huse was the author of four books on religion. As a life-long student of the beginnings of the Anglo-Saxon race, she read history in the light of Bible prophecy and while substantiating the claims of Professor Charles H. L. Totten and other experts who traced the lost tribes of Israel to the Anglo-Saxons of England and the U.S., she added interesting revelations from the metaphysical standpoint.

== Early life and education ==
Sibyl Marvin Huse was born in Paris, France, March 2, 1866. She was the daughter of Caleb Huse, educator, and of Harriet Pinckney Huse. She is a descendent of old American stock. Hume descended from an old New England family. Her father, Caleb Huse, was born in Newburyport, Massachusetts. He was a graduate of the U.S. Military Academy at West Point. On the paternal side, Huse traces a direct line back to Richard de la Huse who fought with William the Conqueror in 1066. The first American ancestor of the name was Abel Huse who came from Berkshire, England, in 1635 and settled in Newburyport, Massachusetts. On the maternal side, Huse is of the ninth generation from Reynold Marvin, who emigrated from Great Bentley, England in 1635 and settled near Hartford, Connecticut. Six generations later, Selden Marvin moved to Fairfield, New York

In an environment of study and discipline, with four brothers and sisters, the early education of Huse was at home, under the instruction of her father, an educator. There was also the influence of a mother; a grandmother, Sibyl Marvin Pinckney; and an aunt, Miss Dora Pinckney.

The knowledge of the Bible, which transfused Huse's work and was the inspiration of many of her best articles, had its beginning in the days when the Bible was her first text book. Religion and the question of British Israelism, were favorite themes in the Huse household and formed a great part of Huse’s training at home. From her childhood, she took in the conversation of family members that the Anglo-Saxon race was constituted of the Ten Lost Tribes of Israel. This discussion was kept alive by the friendship between the Huse family and Totten, Professor of Military Science at Yale University and an authority on the Anglo-Israel question. His letters, books and pamphlets were a constant stimulation.

Two years of boarding school followed the home training, after which came various courses at universities in the U.S. and abroad.

== Career ==
=== Teacher ===
Huse began her teaching experience with the children of Louis Zogbaum, the painter of military life. Shortly after this, she left home to go to Catonsville, Maryland near Baltimore, to teach in St. Timothy’s School, where she stayed for seven years. In 1890, she was recorded as being a teacher and pedagogue living in Highland Falls, New York.

At this time, it seemed best for her to have a complete change and rest, and she went to Europe, expecting to make it her home. She spent two years in Switzerland, studying at the University of Lausanne. It was during this period that Huse first studied Christian Science. Huse went to Europe without any definite sense of ever returning to the U.S. An aunt gave Huse a copy of Science and Health Key to the Scriptures, by Mary Baker Eddy, to read during her travels.

Upon Huse's return to the U.S., she attended the First Church of Christ, Scientist, New York City. Almost immediately, she took class instruction from Augusta Emma Stetson , and became a member of the New York City Christian Science Institute, of which Stetson was the principal. That same year, she took out membership in The Mother Church, Eddy's church in Boston, and also Stetson's church in New York City.

For a short time after returning from Europe, Huse took up her old work of teaching, but from this time on, her activities were mainly identified with the Christian Science movement. In her last year of teaching in connection with a school, her only classes were in the study of the Bible.

=== Christian Science activities ===
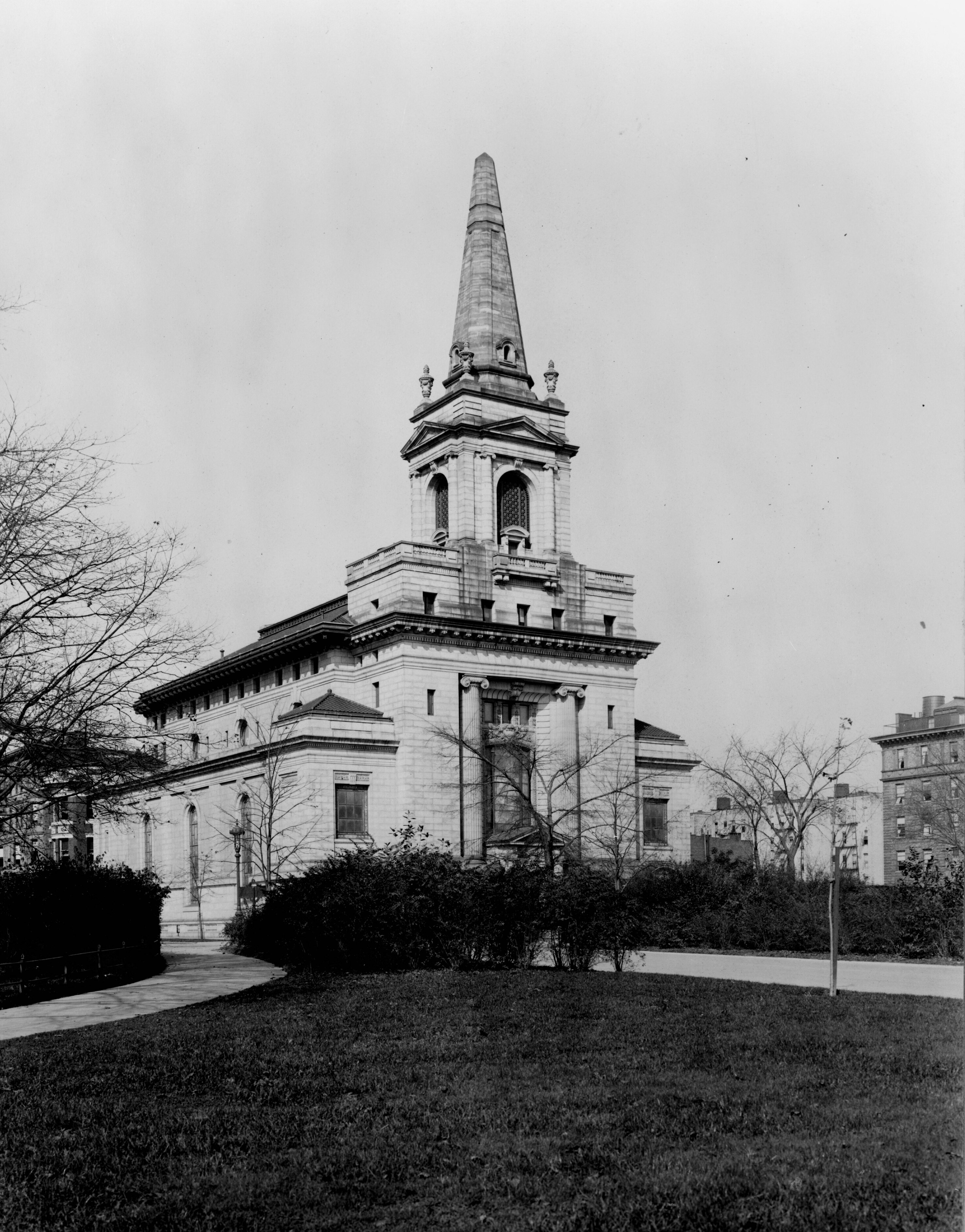
First Church of Christ, Scientist, New York City

From 1903 to 1905, she served in Stetson’s church as chair of one of the committees appointed to receive visitors and enquirers, and she also taught in the Sunday school. In 1905, seven years after she had received class instruction, Huse was elected Second Reader of the church, whose chief duty it was to read from the Bible at the Sunday service. In responding to this call, she definitely withdrew from all outside activities. Many of those who came to hear her read, stayed to become her patients and she soon built up a large practice.

Shortly after she began her duties as Reader, Stetson’s new home next to her church was completed, and Huse was invited to become a member of her teacher’s household, where she lived thereafter. When her three year’s term as Reader expired, Huse was appointed chair of the Reading Room. This large main Reading Room was above the auditorium of the church and was surrounded by offices where practitioners saw their patients. These practitioners were appointed by the Trustees of the church. There were at this time 25, of whom Huse was one.

The year 1909 brought many changes to the church wherein Huse had done considerable work. That year became, in a sense, the dividing line between the old regime in the material organization and the new in which Huse, with Stetson, continued her work unhampered by the ties of organization. When Stetson’s students were summoned to Boston to be questioned by the directors of the Mother Church as to the correctness of her teaching, Huse and the others upheld Stetson, their teacher. The charge against them was that they remained loyal to Stetson after she had been discredited and expelled by the Mother Church for having taught and practiced "malicious animal magnetism" and other false doctrine. The Stetson followers issued a statement at that time denying that Stetson had ever taught them "M. A. M."

In February 1910, in correction of certain published statements concerning her health, Huse gave out for publication a letter, in which she said:—

"I am a student of Christian Science and have found in Mrs. Augusta E. Stetson a teacher who has proved to me beyond question her understanding of its principle, life, love, truth. I have been practising Christian Science for six years, and during that entire period have known the blessing of the unvaryingly perfect health I now enjoy."

That same year, for their allegiance to Stetson, Huse and 15 others was dropped from the roll of the Mother Church, and from the roll of First Church of Christ, Scientist, New York City, where she had served so long. The enforced retirement from the demands of Church organization by no means meant cessation from activity for Huse. Her practice constantly grew as did the demand for her teaching. Her activities in the furtherance of the cause of Christian Science as taught by Eddy continued uninterrupted. In her office on West End Avenue, she daily practiced the art of metaphysical healing, and also held classes for instruction in Christian Science according to the outline given by Eddy.

Huse was a member of the Oratorio Society of the New York City Christian Science Institute. This institute was chartered by Stetson (1893), who was its principal. Hume was one of its five directors.

In 1926-28, Huse had a 15-minute night time speaker spot on radio station WHAP New York.

=== Author ===
Various letters and articles were published from time to time throughout her career in Christian Science, but her first publication in book form, Christ's Offspring or Spiritual Generation, which was printed by G. P. Putnam's Sons, did not appear until 1921. In this, she gave her conception of the Christ idea, and the unfolding of the spiritual universe, as well as her sentiment favoring the elevation of Stetson to the spiritual leadership of the Christian Science church. Twelve Baskets Full, the largest of Huse's works, was dedicated to Stetson. The third book, Six days Shalt Thou Labor, appeared in 1923. Israel, Prince of God, published in 1924, was her fourth book.

== Death ==
Sibyl Marvin Huse never married. She died at the home of a sister in Plainfield, New Jersey, April 5, 1939.

== Selected works ==
=== Books ===
- Christ's Offspring or Spiritual Generation, 1921 (text)
- Twelve Baskets Full, 1922 (text)
- Six days Shalt Thou Labor, 1923 (text)
- Israel, Prince of God, 1924 (text)

=== Poems ===
- "America"
