= Massachusetts Metaphysical College =

Educational institution in Boston, Massachusetts, US

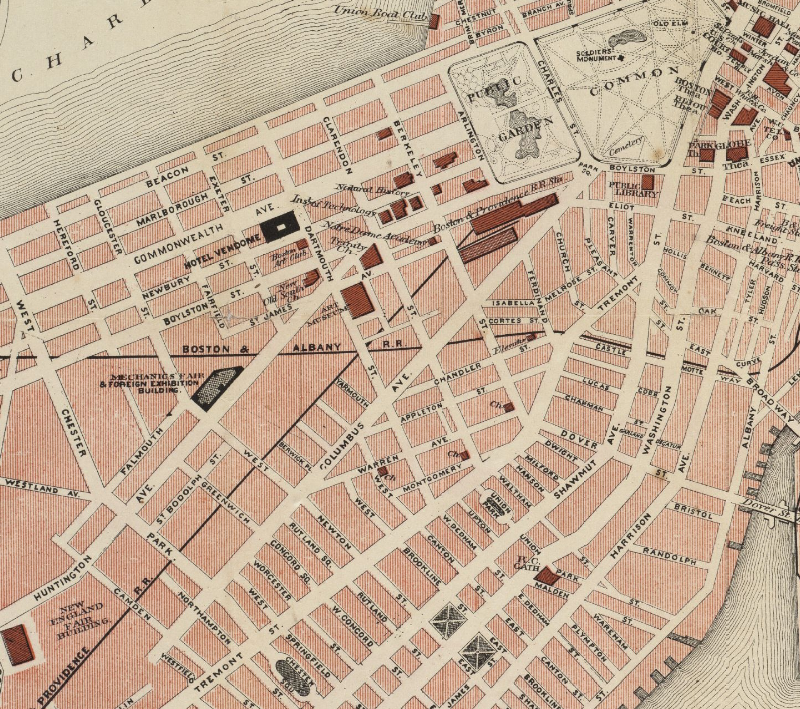
Detail of 1883 map of Boston, showing Columbus Avenue

The Massachusetts Metaphysical College was founded in 1881 by Mary Baker Eddy in Boston, Massachusetts, to teach her school of theology that she named Christian Science. After teaching for almost seven years, Eddy closed this college in 1889 in order to devote herself to the revision of her book, Science and Health with Key to the Scriptures, but retained her charter and reopened the college in 1899 as an auxiliary to her Church.

== History ==
=== The Massachusetts Metaphysical College, 1882–1889 ===
In 1881, Mary Baker Eddy founded the Massachusetts Metaphysical College under a provision of a 1874 Massachusetts state law governing the establishment of degree-granting colleges. Degrees given out included Bachelor of Christian Science, or C.S.B.; and Doctor of Christian Science, or C.S.D. (sometimes listed in pamphlets as C.S. and D.C.S. respectively). Later, the C.S.D. degree was discontinued, and C.S.B. eventually came to refer to a teacher of Christian Science, while C.S. came to simply mean a class-taught student.

Two medical doctors, Charles J. Eastman and Rufus King Noyes, helped Eddy set up the college but did not remain involved beyond a few months. Eddy founded the college while living in Lynn, Massachusetts, but soon moved it to 569 and 571 Columbus Avenue in Boston, where it remained until its closing.

Eddy was the college's president and principal teacher. Other teachers included her husband Asa G. Eddy, her adopted son Ebenezer Foster-Eddy, and her student General Erastus Newton Bates. In addition to teaching, Bates served as the college's president for a short time before it closed. Eddy also gave lectures in Hawthorne Hall and other venues around Boston while teaching classes.

The official cost of classes ranged from $100 to $300; however, many students were offered discounted or even free tuition, and husbands and wives who took classes at the same time paid on a two-for-one basis. Clergy were offered class free of charge, indicating a desire on Eddy's part to share her theology with religious leaders of the day.

Eddy's Normal classes were designed to prepare teachers to start Christian Science Institutes outside of Boston to teach Christian Science; and by 1888, many such institutes existed in major cities around the United States, with more than half started by women. As time went on demand for instruction by Eddy at the Massachusetts Metaphysical College increased, with classes becoming larger and more frequent; however, in 1898 Eddy closed the college as she said because of "a deep-lying conviction that the next two years of her life should be given to the preparation of the revision of Science and Health, which was published in 1891."

=== Students ===
Some of the notable students who attended Eddy's classes at the college between 1882 and 1889 included Annie M. Knott, Laura Lathrop, Augusta Emma Stetson, Emma Curtis Hopkins, General Erastus Newton Bates, and Calvin A. Frye. It was notable that Eddy accepted students to her college regardless of gender, as it was a rarity at the time for women to attend any type of college, especially together with men in the same classes, let alone to teach, preach, or own businesses.

While Eddy stated that she taught over 4,000 students at her college, she might have included informal students or have actually been referring to the sum total of all students taught under her authority as president of the college, including the thousands of students taught when the college was reopened as an auxiliary to her church in 1899 under the Church's Board of Education. By that time, other teachers, such as Eddy's adopted son, Ebenezer Foster-Eddy, Edward A. Kimball, and Judge Septimus J. Hanna, had taught many subsequent classes. Kimball himself, for example, taught over 150 classes. Foster-Eddy, as well as General Erastus Newton Bates, had also taught during the period while the college was open. By 1889, her Normal (teachers' class) students had also been teaching under her authority and under her signed certificates in the US and overseas. She could have also included in the number those who attended her public preaching at the time, which she could have considered teaching outside the official classroom setting. In any case, John V. Dittimore, former director and clerk of her church and later Eddy critic, gives a far shorter list in his biography on Eddy published in 1932. His list is probably limited to students at the college whom Eddy personally taught in an official classroom setting before she turned over the teaching to others.

=== After 1889 ===
In 1898, Eddy sent invitations to roughly 70 students to attend another class she would teach. Students in this class included Calvin A. Frye, Septimus J. Hanna, Sue Harper Mims, and Irving C. Tomlinson.

Upon Eddy's death in December 1910, the By-laws of her church stipulated that the college's vice-president would succeed her as president. This person was Judge Septimus J. Hanna who, with his wife, had been early students of Eddy and who occupied more positions of trust in the Christian Science Church than any other individual. Today Christian Science teachers continue to teach in many countries under the auspices of the Christian Science Board of Education, the successor organization to the college, which was set up by Eddy in 1898 under the same charter as the college.
