= Augusta Emma Stetson =

American religious leader

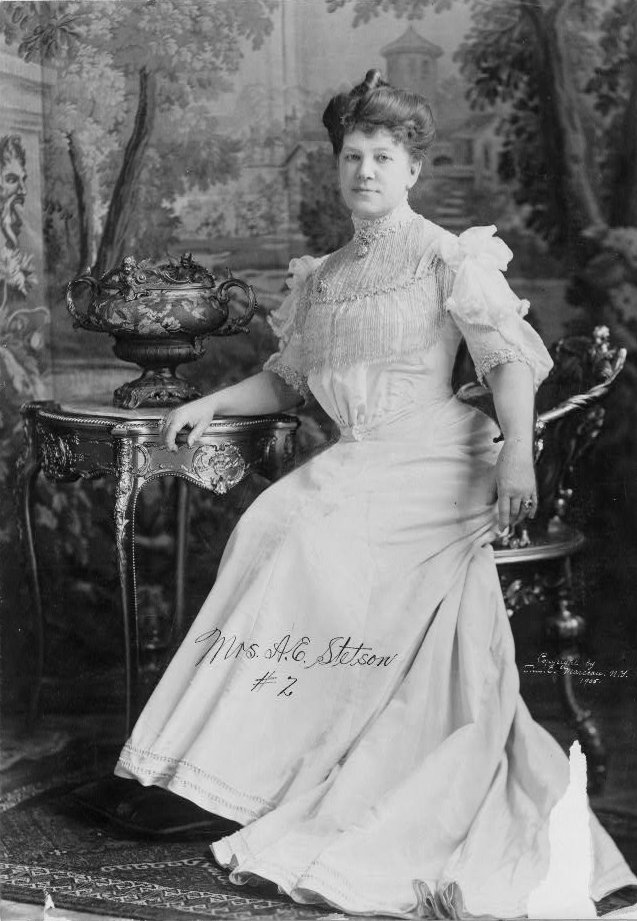
Augusta Stetson, c. 1905

Augusta Emma Stetson (née Simmons) (October 12, 1842 – October 12, 1928) was an American religious leader. Known for her impressive oratory skills and magnetic personality, she attracted a large following in New York City. However, her increasingly radical theories, conflicts with other church members including a well-known rivalry with Laura Lathrop, and attempts to supplant Mary Baker Eddy as the leader of The First Church of Christ, Scientist, led to her eventually being excommunicated from the church on charges of insubordination and of false teaching. Afterwards she began preaching and publishing various works on her theories which she named the "Church Triumphant," and started a controversial radio station to advance her cause.

== Early life and career ==
Augusta Simmons was born in Waldoboro, Maine to Peabody and Salmoe Simmons, and attended the Lincoln Academy. She married Frederick J. Stetson and lived in England, India, and British Burma with her husband, before returning to New England for reasons of her husband's health. She studied at the Blish School of Oratory in Boston, and had started work as a professional elocutionist when in 1884, after attending a lecture given by Mary Baker Eddy, the founder of The First Church of Christ, Scientist, she studied under Eddy at the Massachusetts Metaphysical College. Eddy's church was based on the healings of Christ Jesus, and drew both faithful adherents and hostile critics. After Eddy's class, Stetson went to Maine and soon began reporting impressive healings herself. In 1885, she was called to Boston to preach at Eddy's own church as one of five preachers on alternating Sundays. Eddy was apparently disappointed with Stetson's preaching style however, such as her going on stage in immodest dress, and was particularly "mortified" by her at least once "imitating a Negro playing on a banjo."

== Stetson's career in New York ==
In November 1886, Stetson was sent by Eddy to New York City. Another student of Eddy's was Laura Lathrop, who had been sent there in October 1885 to help organize a church there, roughly a year before Stetson. Lathrop was, according to a journalist, "almost the antithesis of Mrs. Stetson in character and temperament" and that "Mrs. Lathrop attracts love, whereas Mrs. Stetson compels respect." Before Stetson arrived in New York, Lathrop had already established a Christian Science teaching institute, stirred up interest for the new religion in the city, and had even been praised for her healing work by Methodist bishop John Philip Newman. Both Lathrop and Stetson were involved in starting First Church of Christ, Scientist, New York (Note: Churches of Christ, Scientist within a single city are named "First", "Second", "Third" and so on, appended with the name of the city. The Mother Church in Boston is known as "The First Church of Christ, Scientist" and is the only one to use the definite article "The" in its title.) in February 1888; which was incorporated with 17 students with Stetson being named as preacher. According to one historian, Stetson's "tall, stately figure, her elegant appearance, her rich speaking voice, and her magnetic personality attracted a large and rapidly growing following, a considerable portion of which was personally devoted to her." Stetson began exerting her influence and control more and more over the New York Christian Scientist community, as well as in other parts of the United States, including as far west as Portland, Oregon.

Stetson clearly resented Lathrop. In 1891, she established the "New York City Christian Science Institute" to rival Lathrop's teaching institute, and formed a core group of support for herself within the fledgling church. Stetson would not allow Lathrop to speak at meetings, and that year, although she had initially encouraged Lathrop to stay in Stetson's church for the sake of unity, Eddy urged Lathrop to split from First Church and start Second Church of Christ, Scientist, New York. (Note: Eddy also later hired Lathrop's son John as a secretary, and would take Lathrop's side during conflicts between the two churches, such as preventing Stetson from building a church two blocks away from Lathrop's.) Stetson however refused to acknowledge any Christian Science churches in New York other than her own. Stetson's rivalry with Lathrop was well known, and she and her followers even tried to purchase Second Church's building lot, which Lathrop's church had recently purchased to build their church edifice on, out from underneath them. By the 1890s, Stetson began losing support even among some of her star pupils such as Blanche Hersey Hogue and Carol Norton. Another teacher of Christian Science, Edward A. Kimball, wrote Eddy: "Mrs. Stetson's fellow scientists [sic.] are getting thoroughly disgusted with her... If she does not begin to reform soon, she will find herself rather lonesome."

In addition to serving as preacher of her church, Stetson had total control over it and approved all major decisions. In 1895, preachers in all Christian Science churches were replaced by readers; however, Stetson required prodding by Eddy herself to in order to stop preaching. (Note: Both Stetson and Lathrop refused monetary offers of thanks by their respective churches for their tenure as readers, and Lathrop refused any remuneration at all, or the title of Reader Emeritus; while Stetson did accept an annual stipend from the church.) Despite relinquishing the position however, she retained absolute power over the church. Stetson believed she was the unquestioned leader of the Christian Scientists in New York, and had a special relationship with Eddy above her other students; Eddy reprimanded her for this, at one point writing her: "Do not claim that you are my chosen one for you are not."

Stetson held the position of First Reader in her church until 1902, when the term of reader in all Christian Science churches was set by Eddy to no more than three years, in part because of Stetson herself. As Eddy told Lathrop: "Almost all my rules in the Manual have been made to prevent [Stetson] injuring my students and causing me trouble in my church... She does not trample on my students as she used to, for she dare not owing to my church bylaws." Eddy increasingly chastised Stetson in letters, but was also grateful for the support Stetson had given her over the years. "Eddy," wrote one historian, "who seemed to genuinely care for Stetson and appreciate her hard work, spent 20 years cajoling and praising her headstrong student, while also occasionally rapping her knuckles." Eddy told Stetson that she was "the most troublesome student that I call loyal", but still thanked her for her work. At one point Eddy told Irving C. Tomlinson that she had "rebuked [Stetson] more severely than almost any other student and am still trying to save her."

Meanwhile, as the congregation of First Church of Christ, Scientist, New York grew larger, they were forced to change meeting location several times to accommodate their increasing congregation. In 1899 they began construction on a large and expensive edifice of their own, costing over one million dollars and which Stetson envisioned would rival The First Church of Christ, Scientist (known as the Mother Church) in Boston, which was the headquarters of the Christian Science movement. The $1,200,000 church edifice on 96th Street and Central Park West was dedicated free of debt in November 1903. Stetson moved into a luxurious $100,000 mansion next to the church built and furnished by her followers for her in 1904, which was viewed speciously within the Mother Church and the wider Christian Science movement, as rumors that Stetson wanted to supplant Eddy as leader of the movement spread. As one historian wrote, at least some part of Stetson wanted Eddy dead so she could replace her as head of the church. Stetson also privately planned to move the headquarters of the Christian Science church from Boston to her home in New York after Eddy's death. Those who opposed Stetson's wishes continued to be ostracized or even excommunicated from her church, including the future First Reader of The Mother Church, William D. McCrackan. Stetson's church continued to grow, and in 1908, Stetson planned to buy the entire blockfront on Riverside Drive from 109th to 110th Street for a new branch church. The new branch church was again envisioned to rival the Mother Church, and was seen as a "formal challenge to the Boston establishment" since only the Mother Church was allowed to have branches. Stetson's plan was that her church would then become a new "Mother Church" for the New York churches.

== Excommunication and later years ==
Because Stetson's church in New York was the largest and richest Christian Science church in the world at the time, many people within and without the movement saw her as Eddy's obvious successor as leader of the Christian Science church, a position Stetson clearly saw herself in as well, and to many it was only a question of whether she would be appointed or institute a coup. This was of concern to Eddy, who took opportunities to make it clear that she would not appoint Stetson as her successor. Eddy had maintained a regular correspondence with Stetson since she had gone to New York, and had consistently and increasingly chastised Stetson for her radical views, especially for Stetson's comparisons between Eddy and Jesus Christ. Eddy tried one last time to bring Stetson back into the fold in December of 1908, inviting her to her home in Massachusetts to talk. Stetson expressed repentance to Eddy, and said she would not build any branch churches to rival the Mother Church. However, in 1909, Stetson again sent Eddy a worshiping letter to the point of heresy. It was the last straw, and Eddy asked the Board of Directors of the Mother Church to investigate Stetson and the conditions of her New York church. She also wrote to Stetson, telling her to "awake" from the temptation to deify her.

The Board conducted an investigation over months of interviews, calling practitioners and officials from the New York church. In addition to what the Board already knew, they found Stetson had told her inner circle that her New York church was the only true Christian Science church in the world, that Lathrop should die, and that the Mother Church was corrupted by the devil. It was revealed that in 1901, Stetson and some of her followers had lied under oath during a lawsuit. Some of her other radical views included that sex and procreation were evil, and that she attempted to "control and to injure persons by mental means."

A particularly important witness was Virgil O. Strickler, a lawyer from Omaha who had moved to New York and joined Stetson's church in 1906, and who by 1909 was serving as the First Reader in Stetson's church. (Note: Although Virgil O. Strickler is best known for his involvement in the Stetson case, he later became a Christian Science lecturer and teacher (CSB), giving lectures with titles such as "Christian Science: A Religion of Love" and "Christian Science: A Religion That Heals Through Spiritual Law".)As First Reader, he was invited into Stetson's private meetings with her inner circle, and had begun keeping a diary of what was said in them after becoming disturbed by what he heard during the meetings. His diary included entries on the fear Stetson's inner circle had of her; her hatred of other churches in New York; that Stetson now believed Eddy was God and that Stetson herself was Christ; and how she tried to harm and even kill others through hypnotism, even at one point unsuccessfully attempting to hypnotize Strickler himself in a "sing-song" voice. The Directors used his diary to frame yes or no questions for Stetson's inner circle in order to get straight answers from them.

In the fall of 1909, the Board revoked Stetsons license as a Christian Science teacher and practitioner, and soon afterwards called Stetson for a personal examination, after which they dropped her name from membership in the church. Stetson's own church, though divided, was persuaded by a timely letter by Eddy to side with the Mother Church in Boston, accepting Stetson's resignation and expelling a number of officials who had sided with her. As one historian wrote: "Such had been the turmoil caused by the case, and so shocking had been the evidence against Mrs. Stetson, that all but a few of her closest associates accepted the banishment with more relief than protest." In a reversal from the previous antagonism with Second Church, The new First Church leadership announced that the Thanksgiving service that year would be combined with Second Church's. (Note: Nearly one hundred years later in 2004, the two churches merged, retaining the name First Church but moving into Second Church's building.)

In 1911, the New York church attempted to erect a "covered passageway" from the street to the rear door of the church. Stetson sued, calling this an illegal spite wall meant to obstruct her view of the church from next door. The litigation wound through the courts for 13 years, ending in victory for Stetson. The spite wall lawsuit was heavily reported in period media.

=== Church Triumphant and radio station ===
Stetson still retained some support, and continued to live in her mansion next to First Church, instructing students who had remained loyal to her. She claimed that Eddy was still on her side, and that Eddy's actions were actually a way to free her from the Mother Church, or that Eddy was merely testing her. She came to believe her mission was to create a more "spiritual" version of Christian Science, which she called the "Church Triumphant." When Eddy died in 1910, Stetson declared that she believed Eddy would rise from the grave like Jesus and appear to her personally before appearing to the rest of the world, a claim Stetson would repeat for the rest of her life. It became a national news story and Christian Scientists, including the Christian Science Board of Directors itself, repeatedly denounced these proclamations as heretical. Stetson was, as one historian put it, an "incurable mythomaniac" and that "nothing she says, especially about herself, can be taken at face value", and she even went so far as to reassemble photostats of handwritten letters from Eddy to make herself look good. (Note: Stetson had a largely negative impact on biographies of Eddy. In particular, Stetson was a main source for a book attacking Eddy by Edwin Dakin.)

Stetson published pamphlets advocating her "Church Triumphant" and attacking the Mother Church, and spent a significant amount of her followers' money promoting her views in newspapers. She also started a short lived magazine called American Standard in order to "guard and foster Nordic supremacy in America" which in 1925 merged with a radio station bought for her by her students. The station broadcast "an extraordinary mixture of protofascist propaganda and classical music." The station, known as WHAP for "We Hold America Protestant", and officially owned by a group of Stetson's students who called themselves the Defenders of Truth Society, was known for being overtly anti-Catholic and anti-Semitic, and was often the subject of controversy. William Taylor, a Stetson follower who was the official licensee for the station, was expelled from the Mother Church for his involvement, and the Mother Church issued a circular denouncing WHAP's anti-Catholic and anti-Jewish broadcasts. Stetson's former church in New York condemned her for the station, saying that she was in "no way connected with the Christian Science movement" and that the church opposed all "attacks on other religions or religionists." In 1927, Stetson predicted her own immortality, and in 1928, shortly before her death, she announced she was withdrawing from her radio station. Stetson died on October 12, 1928, in Rochester, New York.

== Published works (partial list) ==
- Poems (1901; second edition, 1910)
- Reminiscences, Sermons, and Correspondence (1913)
- Vital Issues in Christian Science (1914)
