= We Two =

We Two may refer to:

- We two, ours one, a population planning term
- We Two (1970 film), a West German drama film
- The Two of Us (1939 film), or Vi två, a 1939 Swedish film directed by Schamyl Bauman
- "We Two," a 1983 single by the Little River Band, from the album The Net
- We Two: Victoria and Albert, a nonfiction book by Gillian Gill

== See also ==
- We Two Alone, a 1952 Italian comedy film
- We Two Are One Too, a 1990 music compilation video released by the British pop group Eurythmics
- We Two Kings, a 2002 episode of tenth season of Frasier
- Us Two (disambiguation)
- Hum Dono (disambiguation)
