= Hongta Hotel Shanghai =

Hotel building in Shanghai, China

Coordinates: 31.223°N 121.528°E

The Hongta Hotel Shanghai is in the Pudong District of Shanghai, China. Opened in 2001 as under the St. Regis Hotels & Resorts franchise but currently operating as part of The Luxury Collection, tt contains 328 rooms and suites, is 37 stories tall and has 376,000 square feet (34,900 m^{2}) of space. The hotel was designed by Sydness Architects.

When it was the St. Regis Shanghai Hotel, it was rated 15th in the hotels of Asia in Condé Nast Publications's Traveler Readers' Choice.
