= Pleasant View Home =

Historic home

- U.S. National Register of Historic Places
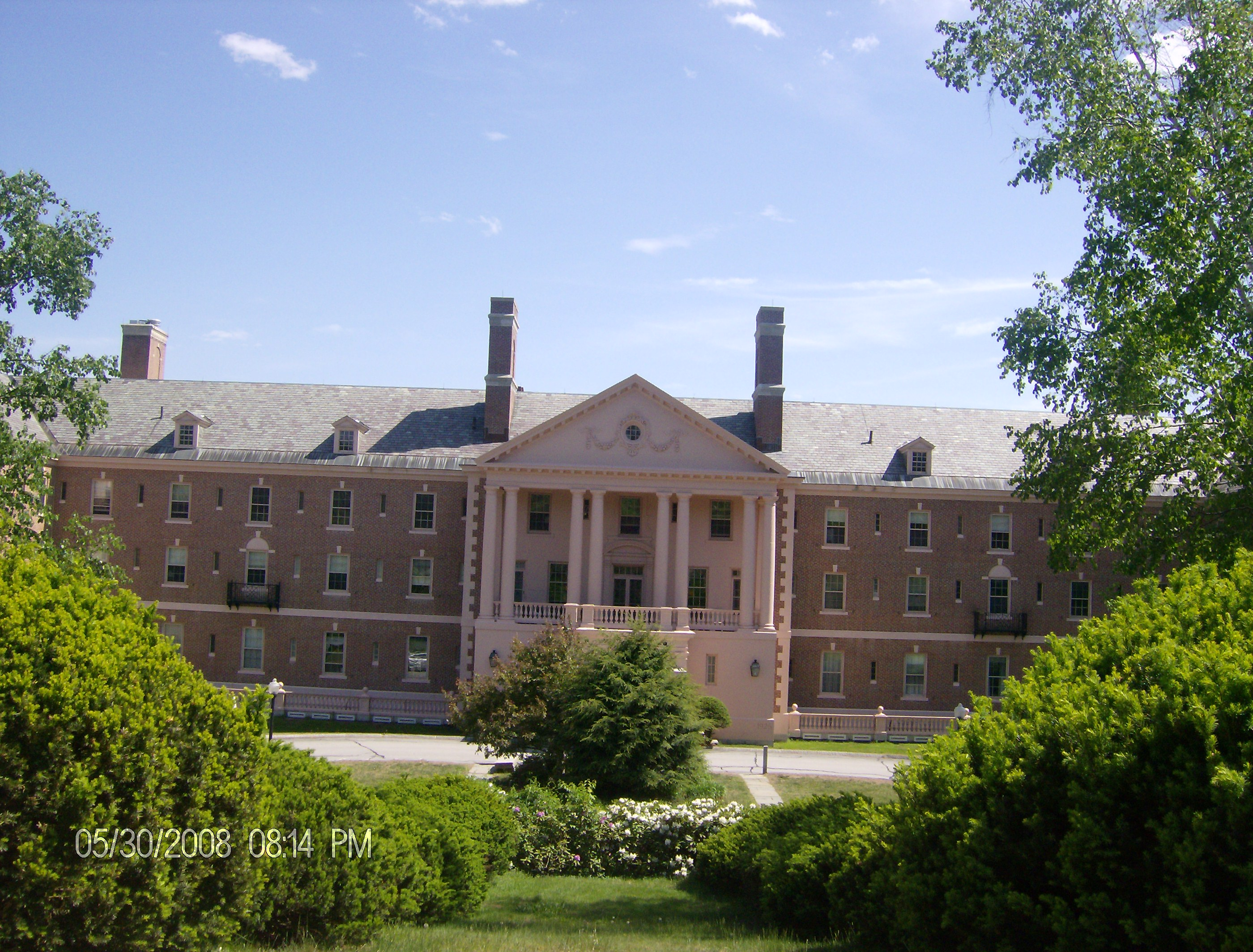

- Location within New Hampshire Location within the United States
- Location: 227 Pleasant St. Concord, New Hampshire
- Coordinates: 43°11′42″N 71°33′31″W
- Area: 48 acres (19 ha)
- Built: 1927
- Architect: Arthur H. Bowditch
- Landscape architect: Arthur A. Shurcliff
- Architectural style: Colonial Revival
- NRHP reference No.: 84003222
- Added to NRHP: September 19, 1984

The Pleasant View Home is an historic senior citizen residential facility located at 227 Pleasant Street in Concord, New Hampshire, in the United States. On September 19, 1984, it was added to the National Register of Historic Places.

From 1892 to 1908, Mary Baker Eddy, an American religious leader, lived in a house at this location which was also called Pleasant View; but her home was torn down in 1917. There has sometimes been some confusion between the two buildings over the years since both were known as "Pleasant View".

== History ==
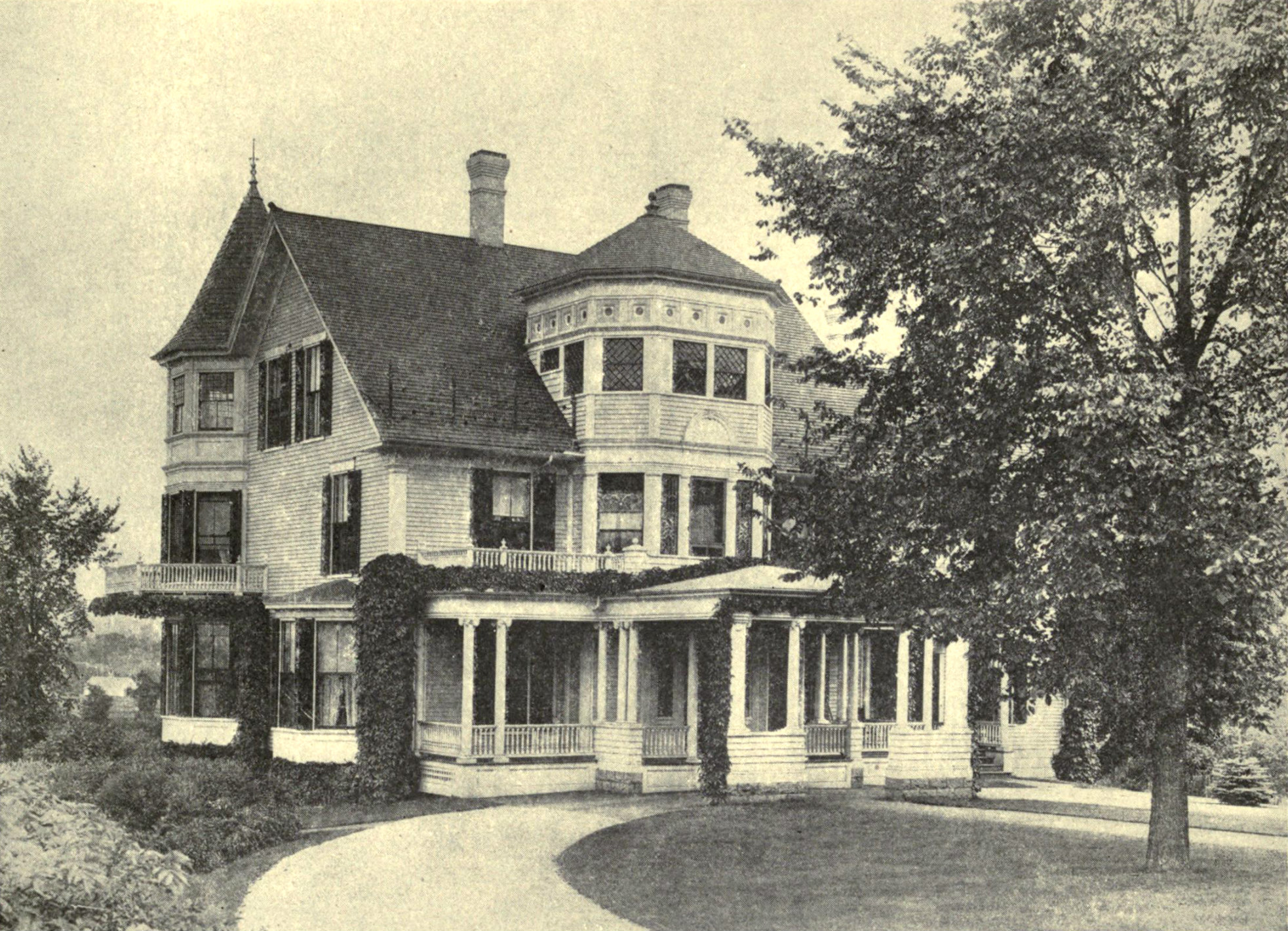
Pleasant View as it looked when Eddy lived there

=== Mary Baker Eddy years ===
Mary Baker Eddy, an American religions leader and the founder of The First Church of Christ, Scientist, lived in a house on 227 Pleasant Street known as "Pleasant View" from 1892 until 1908, at which point she moved to an estate at 400 Beacon Street, Chestnut Hill, Massachusetts. She was well known in Concord, New Hampshire, where Pleasant View was located, and gave money to various philanthropic causes of the city— including providing shoes for local children; and contributing funds for paving streets, the State Fair Grounds, and the local Christian Science church.

Eddy took many significant steps in the foundation of her church while living at Pleasant View, including the publishing of a number of books such as Christ and Christmas (1893), Pulpit and Press (1895), the Church Manual (1895), Miscellaneous Writings (1897), and a major revision of Science and Health with Key to the Scriptures (1902); starting the weekly Christian Science Sentinel and Bible Lesson in its current form, and the monthly Der Herold der Christian Science in German; and organizing the Christian Science Board of Lectureship, Board of Education, Committee on Publication, and the Publishing Society. It was also during this time when the original edifice and extension of The First Church of Christ, Scientist in Boston were built and dedicated.

Journalist Arthur Brisbane, who interviewed Eddy, described the home as "simple and unpretentious".

=== After Eddy ===
After Eddy's death in 1910, it was owned by the board of directors of her church, who did nothing with the house for some time. In 1917 they decided to destroy the house; although some of it, including the gazebos and front gate, was salvaged.

In 1927, the Board built a rest home on the site. The new building, which still stands today, was called the "Pleasant View Home", and there has sometimes been some confusion over the years since both buildings were called "Pleasant View".

In 1975, the church sold the property to the state of New Hampshire which used it as a residence for mental patients of a state hospital. On September 19, 1984, the building was added to the National Register of Historic Places. Also in 1984 it was sold again, this time to the McKerley family who already operated another nursing home in Concord. They remodeled the building and reopened it as a private retirement condominium community. It was later sold to Genesis HealthCare, but as of 2021 the company announced plans to sell the building.

== See also ==
- List of former Christian Science churches, societies and buildings
- National Register of Historic Places listings in Merrimack County, New Hampshire
- New Hampshire historical marker no. 105: Mary Baker Eddy 1821–1910
