= Us Two =

Us Two may refer to:

- "Us Two" (song), a song from the stage musical Chitty Chitty Bang Bang

== See also ==
- We Two (disambiguation)
- Hum Dono (disambiguation)
