= Hum Dono =

Hum Dono (lit. 'We Two') may refer to these in Indian entertainment:

- Hum Dono (1961 film), starring Dev Anand
- Hum Dono (1985 film), starring Rajesh Khanna
- Hum Dono (1995 film), starring Rishi Kapoor
- Hum Dono (TV series), a Hindi song countdown show which follows the story of two people
- "Hum Dono" (1969), the title of a recording by the Joe Harriott and Amancio D'Silva Quartet
- "Hum Dono", a song by Vishal–Shekhar and Shruti Pathak from the 2025 Indian film Tu Meri Main Tera Main Tera Tu Meri

== See also ==
- We Two (disambiguation)
- Us Two (disambiguation)
- "Hum Dono Hain Alag Alag" or "Main Khiladi", a song by Anu Malik, Udit Narayan and Abhijeet Bhattacharya from the 1994 Indian film Main Khiladi Tu Anari
- Hum Dono Hain Alag Alag, an Indian television series
