= Calvin Frye =

Calvin A. Frye
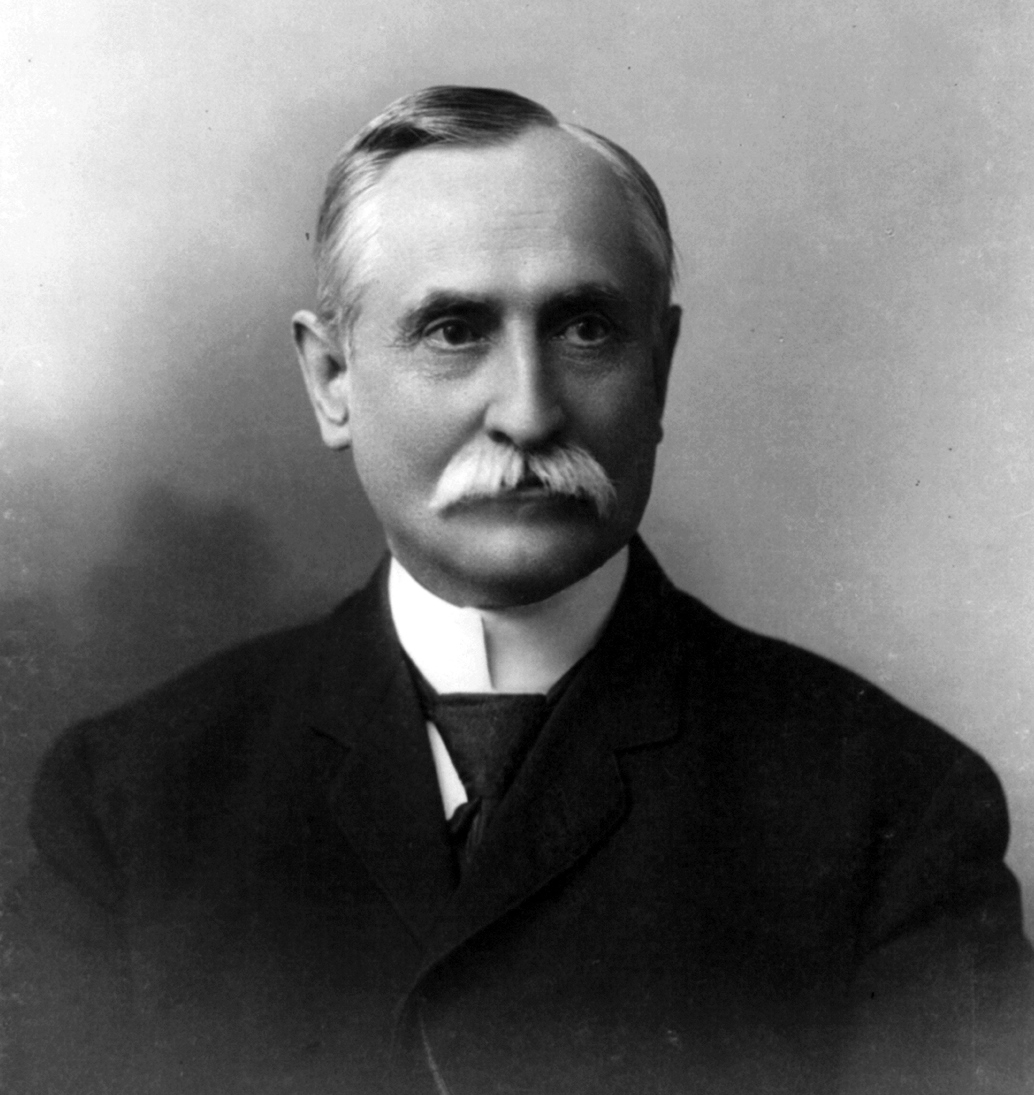
- Calvin Frye, c. 1901
- Born: August 24, 1845; Frye Village, Massachusetts; now part of Andover, Mass.
- Died: April 26, 1917 (aged 71)
- Occupations: Machinist, personal assistant
- Years active: 1882–1910 as assistant
- Known for: Assistant to Mary Baker Eddy

Calvin Augustine Frye (August 24, 1845 – April 26, 1917) was the personal assistant of Mary Baker Eddy (1821–1910), the founder of Christian Science.

== Biography ==
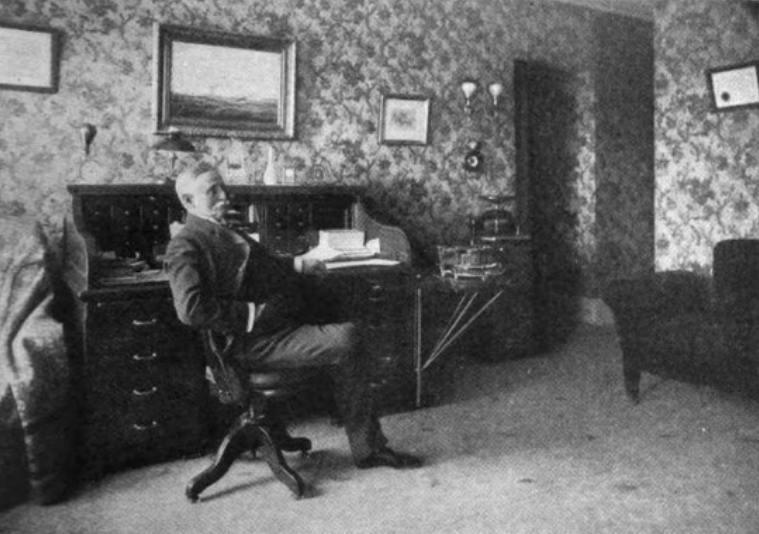
Calvin Frye at his desk

Calvin Frye was born in Frye Village, named after his grandfather, which is now part of Andover, Massachusetts. His grandfather and great-grandfather had fought in the War of 1812 and the American Revolutionary War, and his father had graduated Harvard in the same class as Ralph Waldo Emerson. After attending the public school in Andover, Frye was apprenticed as a machinist in Davis & Furber's machine shops in North Andover, where he worked until he joined Eddy. He moved with his family to Lawrence in the early 1860s. When he was 26 years old, Calvin married Ada E. Brush of Lowell, who was visiting in Lawrence, and who attended the same church. She died one year after the marriage, and Frye moved back in with his family. Frye was active in his local Congregational church as a librarian, class leader, and usher.

Calvin and his widowed sister, Lydia Roaf, first became interested in Christian Science through a sister-in-law, the wife of his brother Oscar Frye. Calvin took a course of instruction under Eddy, after which he, as well as his sister, became practitioners in Lawrence, although he would only be there for about a year. Calvin joined Eddy in Boston in 1882, shortly after the death of her husband Asa Eddy. Lydia followed Calvin, and for some time did Eddy's housework. Lydia later returned to Lawrence. Asa Eddy had gone to Lawrence shortly before his death to inquire about Calvin Frye as a possible secretary for his wife's work, and Rev. Joshua Coit, Frye's former pastor in the Congregational church, had recommended him for his honesty.

Frye lived in Eddy's homes at 569 Columbus Avenue, Boston, and later at Pleasant View, Concord, New Hampshire, and Chestnut Hill, Massachusetts. He worked as Eddy's secretary, managing her personal affairs, and dealing with her official correspondence. He was reportedly with her practically every day from August 1882, when he joined her household as her chief aide, until she died in December 1910. Eddy praised Frye, saying "Calvin is invaluable to me in my work, because he would not break one of the ten commandments."

After Eddy's death, Frye continued serving the church, as First Reader of First Church of Christ, Scientist, Concord, New Hampshire from 1912 to 1915; and as president of The Mother Church in 1916. Frye also traveled and played music.

Frye became known locally during his lifetime for taking Eddy for a daily ride in a horse-drawn carriage, with Frye dressed in a uniform and top hat sitting next to the coachman. Among critics of the church he is known chiefly for the diary he left behind, which details Eddy's domestic life. Caroline Fraser, the most famous modern critic, called his notebooks "mysterious" in 1999, and claimed that at the time of writing, no outside scholars had been allowed to see the originals. In 2002, Frye's diaries, which number well over 100, were made available to the public through the Mary Baker Eddy Library.

In the hours following Frye's death in 1917, John V. Dittemore, a former member of the church's Board of Directors who had become estranged from them, entered Frye's house and removed sections from Frye's diary which he considered most incriminating, he then transcribed, photographed, and burned the originals. He later used the copies to write a critical biography of Eddy with Ernest Sutherland Bates in 1932.
