= Mary Baker Eddy (Gill book) =

1998 biography by Gillian Gill

- Author: Gillian Gill
- Language: English
- Subject: Mary Baker Eddy
- Genre: Biography
- Publisher: Hachette Books
- Publication date: 1998
- Pages: 700
- ISBN: 0-7382-0227-4

Mary Baker Eddy (1998) by Gillian Gill is a biography of Mary Baker Eddy, a religious leader and founder of the Church of Christ, Scientist.

== Content ==
Mary Baker Eddy, the founder of the Church of Christ, Scientist and author of Science and Health with Key to the Scriptures, was a controversial figure both during her lifetime and afterwards, with most previous biographies of Eddy being "divided between demonizing caricatures and Christian Science hagiography" according to Beryl Satter. Gill examines various controversies surrounding Eddy's life, including her relationship with her son, her supposed debt to Phineas Quimby and the longevity of the accusations surrounding him, her use of morphine, and her relations with staff. The book is written from a feminist perspective, and explores and analyzes the significance that gender played in Eddy's controversial life. Satter states that "Gill acknowledges Eddy's human frailties but places them in context of religious struggle, not female irrationality." Throughout the book, including in the extensive appendix and end-notes, Gill discusses previous biographical treatments of Eddy and explores their strengths and weaknesses, as well as discussing the difficulties facing historians writing on the topic. Gill also discusses the frequent revisions of Eddy's book Science and Health with Key to the Scriptures.

Gill constructs her book around four periods of Eddy's life: her early life including her illness, widowhood, single motherhood and other struggles (1821–62); her difficulties as she began to found her religious movement (1863–82); the beginnings of her success as a church leader and author (1883-1905); and her final years (1906–10).

== Archival access ==
Gill had difficulty obtaining what as she called the "frustratingly limited" access to archival materials at The Mother Church, and in the book discusses the process of obtaining what she did, as well as the other sources which she used. Gill did not have complete access, as the archives at the church had previously been closed to most scholars, but while Gill was working on the book, Virginia Harris, at the time a member of the Christian Science Board of Directors, began the process of opening the archive to scholars, including Gill to a limited extent. In 2002, a short time after Gill's book was published, the archive was fully opened to scholars and the public as part of the Mary Baker Eddy Library.

== Reception ==
Gill's book has received generally positive reviews by scholars. Stephen J. Stein writes: "Gill has constructed a well-written and extensively documented, sympathetic yet not uncritical biography of a very complex woman... Gill's biography is a lively, sophisticated, and engaging account of Eddy's life. Historians interested in Eddy, Christian Science, the broader context of New Thought, and nineteenth-century women will find much to use in both the text and the notes." Both Newell G. Bringhurst and Paul C. Gutjahr have listed the book among the most insightful of the numerous biographies on Eddy. According to Cynthia D. Schrager, the book is "[b]alanced, judicious and, above all, skillful at bringing gender to bear as a context lamentably lacking in previous biographies, Gill eschews the polemical tone of most Eddy scholarship and brings a refreshing new angle of vision to her life and achievements." Rennie B. Schoepflin calls the book "an insightful feminist defense," and L. Ashley Squires calls it "an eminently necessary addition to a long list of biographical treatments written since the founder's death in 1910... [Gill's] use of primary sources is like that of a forensic investigator trying to get to the bottom of some of the thorniest controversies that surround Eddy’s life and work." Irene Hall noted that the book was "both weighty (700 pages) and thoroughly researched." Jana Riess wrote that while the book is "not perfect", she expects it to "stand the test of time as the first major study to mine the considerable scholarly possibilities that exist between church-sanctioned hagiography and muckraking exposé."

The book has received some criticism for defending Eddy in places. Caroline Fraser, an ex-Christian Scientist and critic of the church and Eddy, went as far as calling Gill one of "Eddy's apologists". However, Mary Farrell Bednarowski writes that Gill "never... becomes Eddy's hagiographer" and the book is "frankly critical" of Eddy in places according to Riess. Satter, despite her generally positive review of the book, also notes that she was disappointed that Gill, who is not a Christian Scientist herself, fails to explore the theology of Christian Science in-depth, but adds that "Gill's primary goal, however, is not to elucidate Christian Science but to understand Mary Baker Eddy as a woman. In this she has succeeded."
