= Nightingales (book) =

Non-fiction study of Florence Nightingale

Nightingales: The Extraordinary Upbringing and Curious Life of Miss Florence Nightingale
- Author: Gillian Gill
- Language: English
- Subject: Florence Nightingale
- Publisher: Ballantine Books
- Publication date: September 1, 2004

Nightingales: The Extraordinary Upbringing and Curious Life of Miss Florence Nightingale is a 2004 non-fiction book by Gillian Gill. It deals with the early life and family background of English nurse and social reformer Florence Nightingale.

== Background ==
The book makes use of archival material related to Nightingale and her family, including private letters and personal diaries. Some of the material used in Gill's study includes the previously uncatalogued archives from the home of Nightingale's sister, Frances Parthenope Verney.

== Overview ==
The book deals with the life of English nurse and social reformer Florence Nightingale, covering the period from her childhood until 1858. Gill suggests that Nightingale's public life and career were shaped by her family and upbringing. She received a comprehensive classical and mathematical education from her father, while also being subject to her mother's strict religious parenting. Gill observes that Nightingale came from a long line of well educated women who were interested in religion, education and social issues. She also notes the Nightingale's political and social beliefs were influenced by her relatives, including her grandfather William Smith.

Gill disputes the theory that Nightingale was a lesbian, arguing that there is no evidence to support the idea that she engaged in romantic same-sex relationships. Instead, Gill argues that Nightingale led a celibate life; she suggests that Nightingale's unhappiness and frequent daydreaming were the result of repressed sexual desire.

Nightingale relied on the support of her family throughout her life, although she resisted their encouragement for her to marry and produce a male heir to the Nightingale estate. Instead, she chose to pursue a career as a nurse, and went on to play a major role in reforming the field of nursing. The book focuses on Nightingale's nursing work in the field during the Crimean War. It only briefly discusses Nightingale's later accomplishments in instituting social and military reforms.

== Publication ==
The book was published by Ballantine Books on September 1, 2004. Its publication that year commemorated the 150th anniversary of Nightingale's arrival in Scutari to nurse wounded soldiers during the Crimean War.

== Reception ==
In the Nursing History Review, Cynthia Connolly called it "a rich, readable, and entertaining narrative that analyzes Nightingale and her family within the military, political, and social contexts of eighteenth- and early-nineteenth-century England." Judith A. Maloni of Nursing Education Perspectives highlighted the ""colorful story of Florence's strong, eccentric, free-thinking forebears" as one of the book's strengths.

A starred review from Publishers Weekly praised Gill's broad investigation of Nightingale's social context and family network. Ruth Johnstone Wales of the Christian Science Monitor wrote that "Gracefully written, Gill's account of her complex and contradictory subject flows well, despite its density of detail."

Mark Bostridge of The Times praised Gill's accessible writing style and detailed examination of how Nightingale's family affected her idiosyncratic life and career. However, he criticized Gill's use of speculation and unfair portrayal of Nightingale's sister and mother. Charlotte Moore of The Telegraph criticized Gill's use of "cliché and jargon", while praising the book's comprehensiveness and use of archival material.

Kirkus Reviews wrote that the book provided a balanced assessment of Nightingale's character, writing that it "notes Nightingale’s faults (e.g., self-pity and a tendency to suck the life out of those who aided her) without losing sight of her intelligence, energy, compassion, and courage in taking on the male army medical establishment in the Crimean War." Theresa Brown, of the American Journal of Nursing, praised the book for foregoing the popular image of Nightingale as a "saint" and instead portraying her as "a complicated, impassioned, and sometimes difficult woman."

Miranda Seymour, in a review for the New York Times, wrote that "Gill does honor to her subject while providing a vivid and compellingly readable account of the family whose loyal support was crucial to her achievement." However, Seymour also felt that the book devoted too much attention to Nightingale's family.

In 2020, Stephen J. Greenberg noted that the book was still the best overview of her family life.
