= Agatha Christie (Gill book) =

1990 book

Agatha Christie: The Woman and Her Mysteries
- Title page for Agatha Christie: The Woman and Her Mysteries (1990)
- Author: Gillian Gill
- Subject: Agatha Christie
- Genre: Non-fiction
- Publisher: The Free Press
- Publication date: 1990

Agatha Christie: The Woman and Her Mysteries is a 1990 nonfiction book by Gillian Gill about the life and bibliography of English mystery fiction author Agatha Christie.

== Overview ==
Gill examines the life and writing of English mystery fiction writer Agatha Christie. In her assessment of Christie, Gill writes that the public perception of Christie as an uninteresting and conventional woman is inaccurate. She presents Christie's fiction as evidence for the author's personal life and character, arguing that her novels provide an honest insight into her real attitudes. Gill ultimately characterizes Christie as adventurous, passionate, and nontraditional woman.

Gill claims that Christie's skill as a writer has been underappreciated because her novels were popular "whodunnits". Citing the presence of well-developed female characters, Gill states that Christie's work should be considered feminist literature. She further theorizes that these feminist themes were escapist in nature, allowing Christie to escape the social constraints that limited women during her lifetime.

Analyzing the antisemitic themes in Christie's early novels, Gill describes Christie's stereotypical portrayal of Jews as a form of unconscious bias. She speculates that the persecution of Jews in Europe under the Nazi regime increased Christie's awareness of antisemitism, thereby influencing her later works to portray Jewish characters more empathetically.

== Publication ==
The book was published by the Free Press in 1990.

== Reception ==
Publishers Weekly praised the overall book for its analysis of Christie, but criticized Gill for overlooking the racist elements in Christie's early novels. Robin Anne Reid of Rocky Mountain Review of Language & Literature wrote that Gill provided an "excellent" biography of Christie, and noted Gill's argument that Christie's literary prowess was unfairly minimized by critics.

John Mortimer of the New York Times praised Gill's literary analysis of Christie's novels, and the overall biography. However, he was unconvinced by Gill's argument that Christie was a major feminist influence on detective fiction, noting that strong female characters had appeared in earlier detective stories, such as Wilkie Collins' Marian Halcombe from The Woman in White (1860) and Arthur Conan Doyle's Irene Adler from the Sherlock Holmes canon.
