= We Two: Victoria and Albert =

- Author: Gillian Gill
- Subject: Queen Victoria and Prince Albert of Saxe-Coburg and Gotha
- Genre: Nonfiction
- Publisher: Ballantine Books
- Publication date: 2009

We Two: Victoria and Albert, Rulers, Partners, Rivals is a nonfiction book by Gillian Gill about the marriage of Queen Victoria and Prince Albert of Saxe-Coburg and Gotha.

== Overview ==
The book analyzes the biographies and relationship between Queen Victoria and Prince Albert of Saxe-Coburg and Gotha, who she characterizes as a "power couple". Gill observes that both Albert and Victoria experienced unhappy childhoods, with strict German tutors, and had few friends in adulthood. Gill argues that their marriage became strained over the years as Victoria's passion for and emotional dependence on Albert grew, while he became increasingly distant.

Gill observes that the balance of power between Albert and Victoria continuously shifted as Albert sought to solidify his control over Britain. The societal expectations of contemporary Europe required women to be deferential to their husbands, while political rank meant that Albert was subservient to Victoria. Gill speculates that this tension was somewhat reduced by Victoria and Albert's strict upbringings, which instilled in both of them strong values of hard work and abstinence. The book ends shortly after Albert's death of typhoid fever, at age 42.

== Publication ==
The book was published by Ballantine Books in 2009.

== Reception ==
Megan Marshall of the New York Times described Gill's analysis as well reasoned and persuasive, positively comparing the Phyllis Rose' Parallel Lives. In a review for Christian Science Monitor, Randy Dotinga praised Gill's writing style. He noted that Gill at times used heavy speculation, but that it was always well founded. Ellen Keith, writing for the Historical Novel Society, praised the book's examination of its subjects' lives and its explanation of European politics. Publishers Weekly described the book as "A lively, perceptive, impressively researched biography".
