= Sydness Architects =

American architecture firm

Sydness Architects is a New York City-based architecture firm founded by K. Jeffries Sydness AIA in 1996. Other senior members of the firm are Associates Matthew M. Ruopoli, AIA and Melissa Carolina Cheing, AIA.

Prior to forming Sydness Architects, Sydness was a partner at Johnson/Burgee Architects, whose founding principals were Philip Johnson and John Burgee. He began at the firm in 1979, and was made partner in 1988. In his thirteen years at Johnson/Burgee, Sydness designed several landmark buildings including the Takashimaya Building in New York, 500 Boylston Street in Boston, Puerta de Europa in Madrid, Spain and the Conrad International Hotel in Singapore.

One of Sydness Architects' first projects, completed in 2001, was the 37-story, 328-room St. Regis Shanghai Hotel, in Shanghai, China. Architectural Digest called the hotel's design, which won an international design competition, "[A]s brilliant as it is simple."

In 2005, the firm took on the restoration of the 104-year-old Second Church of Christ, Scientist on Central Park West and West 68th Street in Manhattan, New York City. Their work was scheduled to clean the facade, reinforce the stained-glass windows, fix leaks which had developed in the copper dome and illuminate the skylight.

Sydness Architects designed two contemporary luxury condominium towers for the Turtle Bay neighborhood of Manhattan, near the United Nations: The Alexander, a 24-story building for 250 East 49th Street, and the Alexander Plaza, a 25-story tower at 315 East 46th Street, which was under construction, but was put on hold after six stories had been built – although the purchase of the site by the United Arab Emirates has put the fate of the project in doubt.

The firm won an invited design competition to re-design the grand banking hall and lobby at 700 Louisiana Street in Houston. Built in 1983, the iconic building, originally the Republic Bank Tower, is a landmark in the city. "The estimated $20 million project...will add 35,000 square fee to the already 1.25 million-square-foot-property."

Sydness Architects has a large portfolio of corporate interiors work in dozens of Manhattan office buildings, as well as lobby renovations. The firm continues to design a wide variety of project types including residential, hospitality and commercial buildings.
