= First Church of Christ, Scientist (New York City) =

Church in Manhattan, New York

- U.S. Historic district – Contributing property
- New York City Landmark
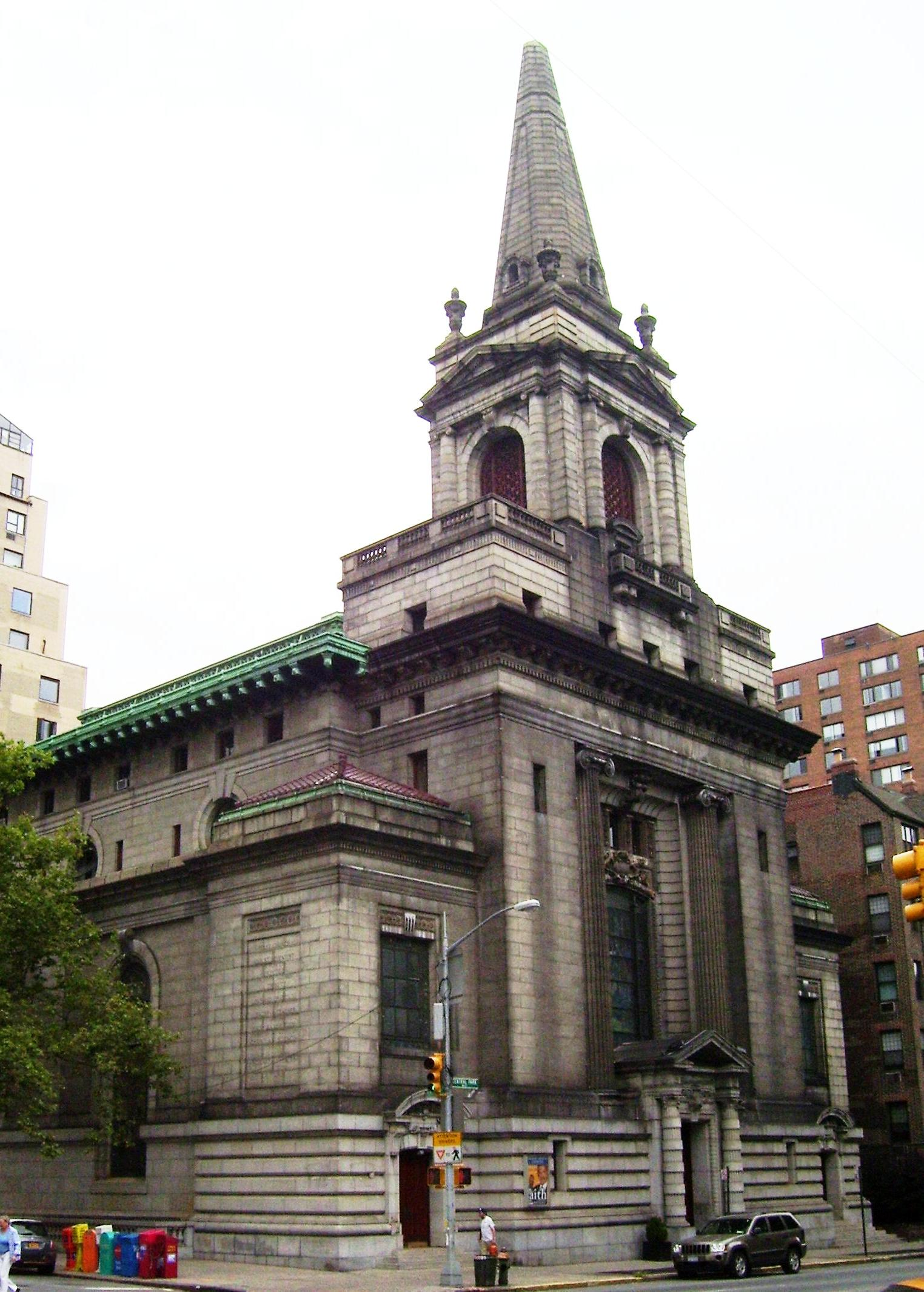
- Former building of the First Church of Christ, Scientist in Manhattan, New York City

- Location within New York City Location within New York Location within the United States
- Location: 1 West 96th Street, Manhattan, New York City, New York, United States
- Coordinates: 40°47′31.2″N 73°57′53.64″W
- Built: 1903
- Architect: Carrère and Hastings
- Architectural style: English Baroque, French Beaux-Arts
- Part of: Central Park West Historic District (ID82001189)
- NYCL No.: 0833

Significant dates
- Added to NRHP: November 9, 1982
- Designated NYCL: July 23, 1974

The First Church of Christ, Scientist in Manhattan is a 1903 building located at Central Park West and 96th Street on the Upper West Side of Manhattan, New York City. The building is a designated New York City landmark.

== Architecture ==
The building, designed by Carrère & Hastings, was completed in 1903, is described by New York Times architectural historian Christopher Gray as "one of the city's most sumptuous churches." The style reminiscent of the churches of Nicholas Hawksmoor, a combination of English Baroque and French Beaux-Arts detailing. The building featured stained-glass windows by John LaFarge. The window over the front door was named "Touch Me Not" and was based on John 20:17, depicting Jesus' encounter with Mary Magdalene outside the tomb.

It featured mosaics, gold-plated chandeliers, marble floors, curved pews made of Circassian walnut, and elevators called "moving rooms" because they were large enough to hold 20 people.

The church was designated a New York City landmark in 1974, and is a contributing property to the federally designated Central Park West Historic District.

== Building use ==
In 2004 the building was sold to the Crenshaw Christian Center and the Christian Science congregation merged with the congregation of the Second Church of Christ, Scientist.

In June 2014, after almost ten years in the building, the Crenshaw Christian Center sold the building to 361 Central Park L.L.C. for $26 million. The new owner planned to convert the 47,000-square-foot structure to condominiums. However, the condominium plan was rejected by the zoning appears board.

In January 2018, the Children's Museum of Manhattan announced that it had acquired the former First Church of Christ, Scientist, building. The church building cost $45 million, and the city provided $5.5 million for a renovation of the church. FXCollaborative was hired to renovate the church. The original plan for the church was controversial, as residents opposed the addition of a penthouse on the roof and the removal of windows, but FXCollaborative's proposal was ultimately approved in June 2020. The museum publicly presented renderings of the renovated church building in 2020. As of 2024, the museum was planning to relocate in 2028. Renovations began in 2026.

== Congregation ==
The congregation was organized in 1886 by Augusta Emma Stetson. The congregation gave Stetson the lot adjacent to the Church on West 96th St, where she lived in a neo-Georgian house. Stetson's house was demolished in 1930, replaced by a "mild(ly) Art Deco" apartment building designed by Thomas W. Lamb.

The congregation met in rented space before construction of the church.
