= Irving C. Tomlinson =

Christian Science practitioner and teacher

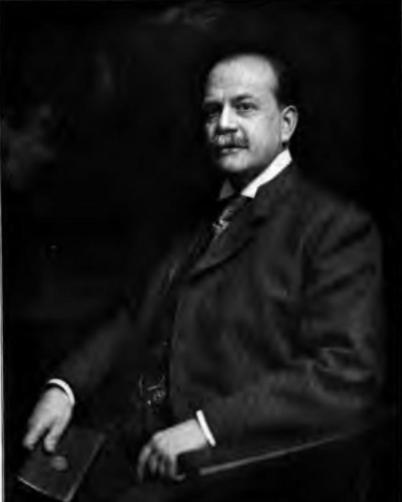
- Irving C. Tomlinson, C.S.B.
- Born: March 22, 1860; Perry, New York
- Died: October 1, 1944 (aged 84)
- Known for: Early worker in the Christian Science movement
- Notable work: The Revelation of Saint John: An Open Book; Twelve Years with Mary Baker Eddy

Rev. Irving Clinton Tomlinson (March 22, 1860 – October 1, 1944) was an American Universalist minister who converted to Christian Science, becoming a practitioner and teacher. For a time, he lived as one of the workers in the household of church founder, Mary Baker Eddy, later writing a book about his experiences called Twelve Years with Mary Baker Eddy.

== Early life ==
Born Irving Clinton Tomlinson, in Perry, New York, he was the son of Rev. Dewitt Clinton and Emmeline C. Eaton Tomlinson. His father was a Universalist minister, and his mother was a writer who was heavily involved in the church, and one of the founders of the Woman's Christian Temperance Union. The family moved to Akron, Ohio, where his father was involved with raising funds to build a new Universalist educational institution, and where Tomlinson later went to preparatory school and college. He was the class president of a senior class of seven students, and business manager of The Argo, the first student publication at Buchtel College. He was also a member of Phi Delta Theta, a fraternity.

While a senior, he and his classmates decided to surpass an effort made by the previous year's graduating class, which had been to place a two-ton boulder on the campus, a lasting reminder of them. Tomlinson and his classmates searched the vicinity and located a syenite boulder on a farm belonging to the industrialist son of Akron's founder, Colonel Simon Perkins. Tomlinson was sent to purchase the "pebble", as they called it, which measured 7 feet tall, 5 feet wide and 3.5 feet across (2.1×1.5×1.1m) and 90 cubic feet (23 m^{3}). The owner didn't want to sell and didn't think Tomlinson and his friends would be able to move it, saying "six yoke of oxen weren't able to budge it." Tomlinson replied, "But, Colonel, that was a good while ago and things have changed. The telephone has been invented, and lots else, and I think we can get it." They did have to pay a local building mover and the move took several days, but they were able to install "The Rock" on campus, where it remains a campus landmark.

Tomlinson graduated from Buchtel in 1880 with a B.A. and in 1883, with an M.A. Buchtel later became the municipal University of Akron. Tomlinson then enrolled in the theological program of Tufts College in Medford, Massachusetts, receiving a Bachelor of Divinity degree in 1888. Immediately after graduating, he became the minister at the First Universalist Society of Arlington, Massachusetts, later First Universalist Church.

Tomlinson also engaged in philanthropic work and organized a charity in Boston known as "The Mutual Helpers" which focused on helping those living in the tenement-house district, and was very successful.

== Christian Science ==
=== Conversion ===
Tomlinson relates that while working as a minister, he recommended a parishioner with a drinking habit try what was known at the time as the Keeley Cure for alcoholism. The man received some benefit, but when Tomlinson was "lauded to the skies by members of [his] congregation" he became embarrassed, writing:

"...my own inability to heal the man seemed most unsatisfactory to one who was supposed to be a follower of the Master. One night during this experience I turned to my Bible for enlightenment and in the sixteenth chapter of Mark I came across the words: 'And these signs shall follow them that believe; In my name shall they cast out devils; they shall speak with new tongues; they shall take up serpents; and if they drink any deadly thing, it shall not hurt them; they shall lay hands on the sick, and they shall recover.' I began to ponder this passage as I never had before.
Jesus' command was unmistakable, yet all I had been able to do to help a poor victim of alcohol was to recommend the Keeley Cure. I began to wonder if there was any church that attempted to do the healing work our Master bade us perform. Next morning I began calling on clergymen of various denominations to find an answer to my question... It was not until eleven months later, in 1894, that I received a completely satisfying answer to my question when I attended my first Christian Science service in Chickering Hall, Boston."

Attending the Friday evening testimony meetings at the church, a precursor to the current Wednesday evening testimony meetings, convinced Tomlinson that "there was at least one church carrying out the Master's injunction to heal the sick." Some time later—still a Universalist minister—he had primary class instruction, taught by Flavia Knapp. Soon after the course was over, however, Tomlinson withdrew from the Universalist church, "[having] found it impossible to ride two horses going in opposite directions."

=== Career ===
Tomlinson became a member of The Mother Church and a Christian Science practitioner in 1897. The day after his admission into the church, he was one of a number of students invited to speak at a gathering of Christian Scientists at Pleasant View. His Christian Science Primary Class teacher, Flavia Knapp, the wife of Ira Knapp, one of the first five directors appointed by Mary Baker Eddy, helped him prepare his remarks. In November 1898, he was invited to be one of about seventy students in the last class taught by Mary Baker Eddy. The same year, he was also appointed as one of the five original lecturers of the Christian Science Board of Lectureship, giving the first ever lecture held at The Mother Church on September 28, 1898. Also in 1898, Eddy asked Tomlinson to serve on the Bible Lesson Committee, which prepares the lesson-sermons read in all Christian Science churches. Tomlinson served on this committee at various times until 1927. The following year, 1899, he was asked by Eddy to serve as First Reader at the church in Concord, New Hampshire; his sister Mary was asked to serve as Second Reader.

Tomlinson served Eddy for 12 years, being in almost daily contact with her, and was a worker in her household from 1907 to 1910. His book, Twelve Years with Mary Baker Eddy, which he began work on in the early 1930s and was published posthumously in 1945, the year after his death, contained a firsthand account of his daily work for Eddy from 1898 to 1910 and included a significant amount of content which had not been published before that time, much of which was based on his calendar and notebooks from those years. As part of what the Christian Science Publishing Society called "The Twentieth Century Biography Series," they came out with a greatly edited "amplified edition" in 1996.

Other roles he filled included being elected President of The Mother Church in 1903 and again in 1921. He, along with Archibald McLellan and Eddy's lawyer, General Frank S. Streeter, was named by Eddy in a deed of trust to benefit her son, his wife, and their children. In 1928, he taught the Normal class, which trains new teachers of Christian Science and is held just once every three years.

== Published writings (partial list) ==
- The Revelation of Saint John: An Open Book (1922)
- Twelve Years with Mary Baker Eddy (1945)
