= Christian Science Quarterly =

Weekly Bible lesson

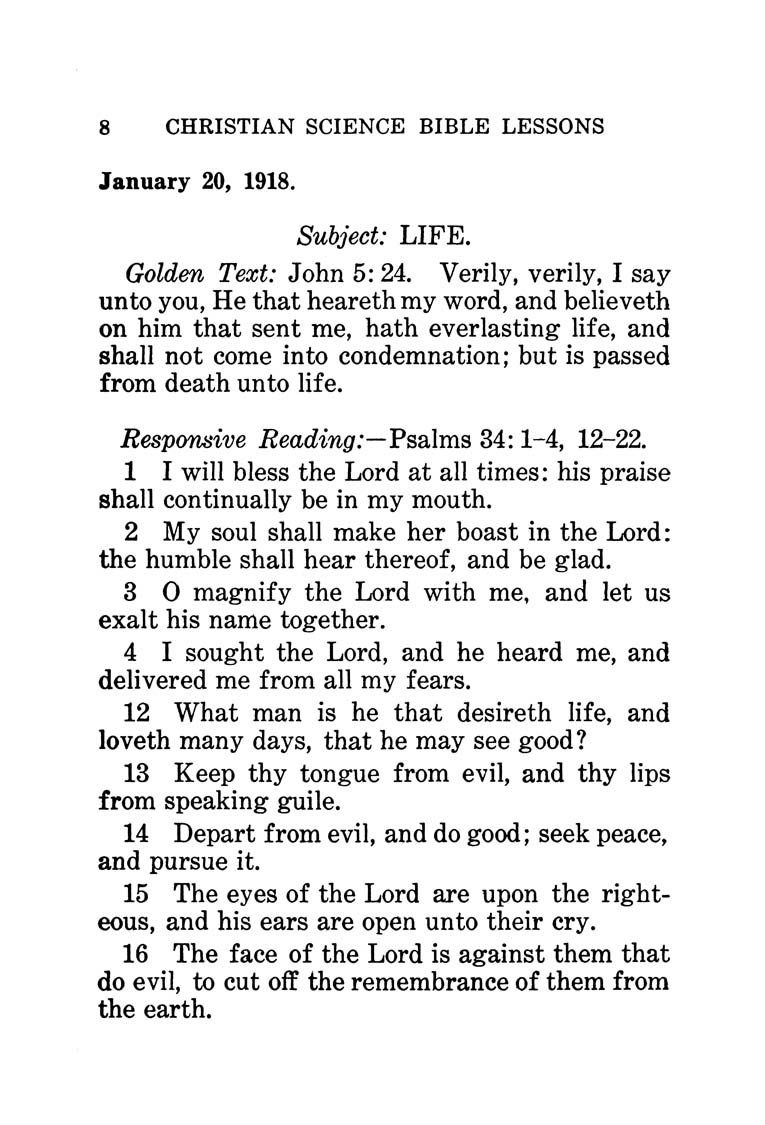
First page of lesson-sermon on Life from January 20, 1918

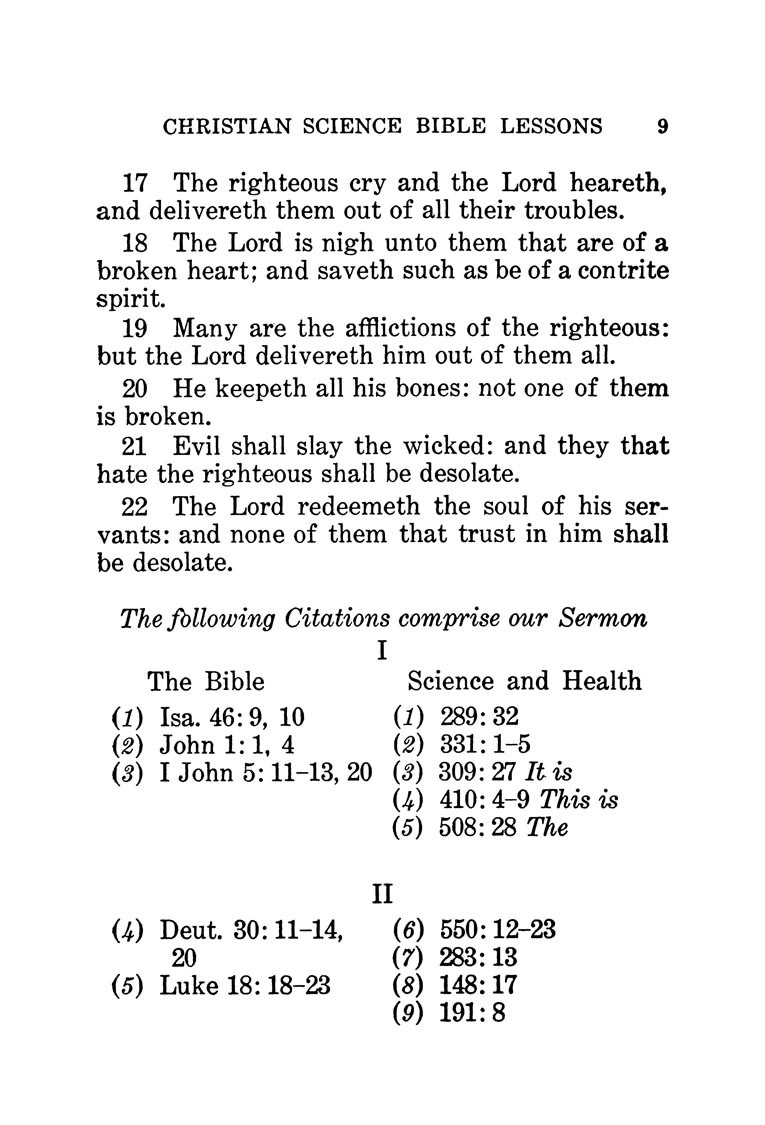
1918 Lesson on Life, page 2

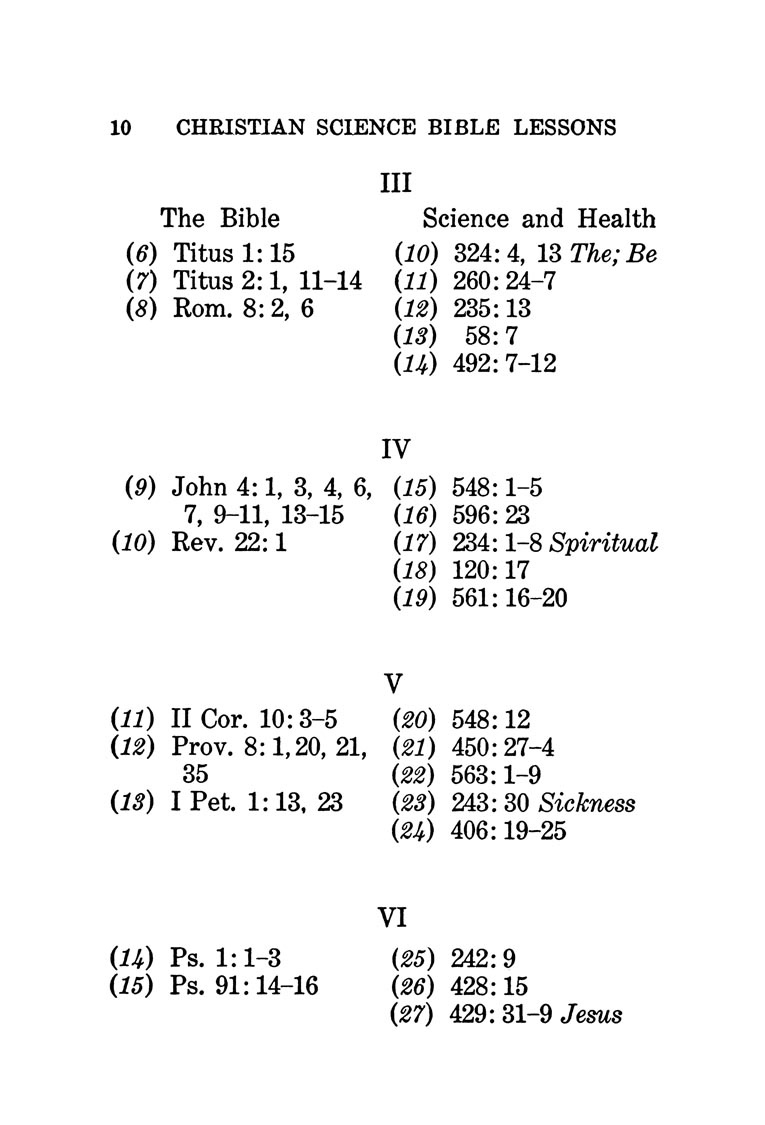
1918 Lesson on Life, page 3

The Christian Science Quarterly (Bible Lessons) is a publication of the Christian Science Publishing Society that sets out the Bible lessons for all students of Christian Science. Each lesson serves as the Sunday sermon in church and is studied for the week preceding the Sunday on which it is read as the sermon.

== Daily Bible study and Sunday sermon ==
Called the Lesson-Sermon, each week's Bible lesson is read in daily individual study during the week, and as the Sunday sermon in Christian Science church services around the world. It is composed of a series of references from the Bible and the Christian Science textbook, Science and Health with Key to the Scriptures, written by Mary Baker Eddy. The particular topic for each week's lesson follows one of twenty-six subjects chosen by Eddy, who "discovered" Christian Science in 1866 and founded the church in 1879. The citations for each lesson are selected by the Bible Lesson Committee in Boston, Massachusetts.

The subjects are (in order): God; Sacrament; Life; Truth; Love; Spirit; Soul; Mind; Christ Jesus; Man; Substance; Matter; Reality; Unreality; Are Sin, Disease and Death Real?; Doctrine of Atonement; Probation After Death; Everlasting Punishment; Adam and Fallen Man; Mortals and Immortals; Soul and Body; Ancient and Modern Necromancy, alias Mesmerism and Hypnotism, Denounced; God the Only Cause and Creator; God the Preserver of Man; Is the Universe, Including Man, Evolved by Atomic Force?; and Christian Science. The sequence of 26 subjects is studied twice each year, though the passages change from week to week, making each week's lesson different. There is no special Christmas or Easter lesson, however there is an additional lesson for Thanksgiving, read in the United States on Thanksgiving Day. For countries other than the U.S., the Thanksgiving service is optional. (Note: Branch churches outside the U.S. choose a date and time that is convenient for them to hold their Thanksgiving service. No collection is taken at any Thanksgiving service.) When there are 53 Sundays in a year, the subject Christ Jesus is added a second time.

The lesson begins with the "Golden Text", a short passage from the Bible related to that week's subject. It is followed by the "Responsive Reading", Bible verses which expound on the focus set by the Golden Text. During the Sunday service, the reading of these verses alternates between the lay First Reader and the congregation. The body of the lesson is divided into several sections, which further develop different aspects of the subject. Bible verses are read first in each section, followed by passages from Science and Health which correlate to the Bible verses selected. For over 100 years, lesson-sermons always had six sections, except for the Thanksgiving lesson, which had four sections, but since 2006, there have been a varying number of sections, from as few as five to as many as eleven.

The Sunday services, which in addition to the sermon, include three hymns, silent and audible prayer, a solo, announcements and a collection, are conducted by the First Reader. During the sermon portion of the service, the Second Reader begins reading the Bible citations, followed by the First Reader who reads the correlative passages from Science and Health for that section, alternating until each of the sections have been read. The Sunday service is one hour long.

The Christian Science Bible Lessons are available in 13 languages and several editions, including audio and digital. The original format, now called the Citation Edition, was designed to be an outline of passages (see example lesson at right) that would promote individual study of the Bible and Christian Science textbook, but in recent years, has been largely supplanted by a time-saving monthly booklet that reprints all the citations. Lesson-sermons from 1904 to 1922 are in the public domain.
