= Laura Lathrop =

Christian Science teacher and practitioner

Laura Lathrop (1845–1922) was an American religious leader in the Christian Science movement, primarily in New York City. A student of Mary Baker Eddy, she became a Christian Science healer, teacher, and church leader in the late nineteenth and early twentieth century. Eddy appointed her to establish Second Church of Christ, Scientist, New York. As such, she provided an alternative form of leadership in New York City to the more assertive and independent approach of the flamboyant Augusta Stetson, leader of First Church of Christ, Scientist, New York. (Stetson was eventually excommunicated from the Christian Science Church.) Although often reluctant in accepting leadership roles, Lathrop was diligent in following Eddy's directives. She proved to be an effective spokesperson for Christian Science in the public square and before legislative committees. Over a twenty-six year period, Lathrop had a very active, demanding, and successful healing practice in New York City.

Lathrop taught about Christian Science to many notables of her time, including women's rights activist Susan B. Anthony, who took a class on Christian Science with Lathrop in 1888. Other prominent individuals who took class instruction in Christian Science from Lathrop were the Methodist Episcopal Bishop John Philip Newman and Jane Stanford, co-founder of Stanford University and wife of the industrialist and politician, Senator Leland Stanford.
