= Second Church of Christ, Scientist (Manhattan) =

Church in Manhattan, New York

Coordinates: 40°46′25″N 73°58′42″W

- Second Church of Christ Scientist
- U.S. Historic district – Contributing property
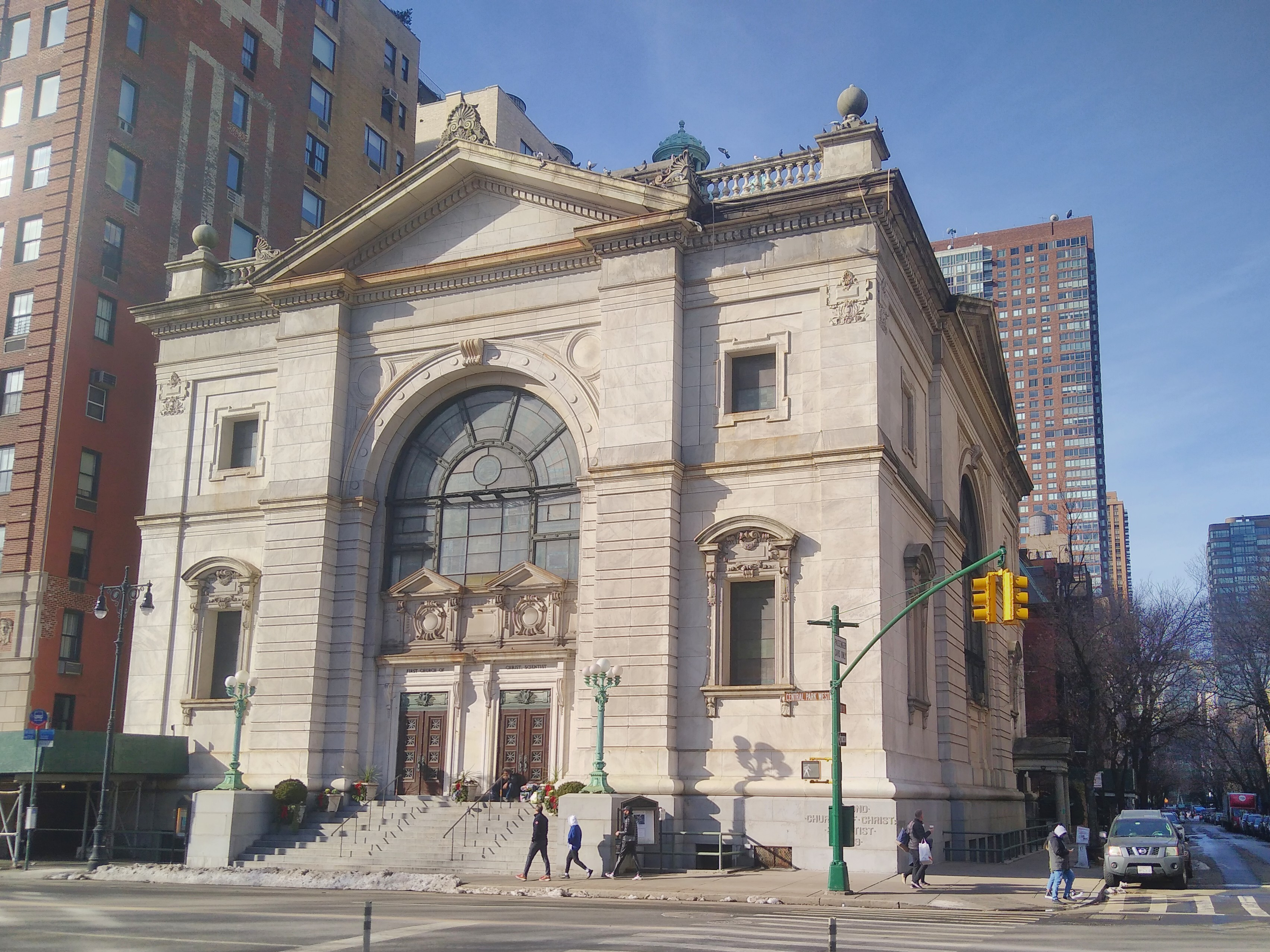
- (2020)
- Location: 77 Central Park West (10 West 68th Street); Manhattan, New York City
- Built: 1901
- Architect: Frederick R. Comstock
- Part of: Central Park West Historic District (ID82001189)

The former Second Church of Christ, Scientist is a historic Christian Science church building located at Central Park West and West 68th Street on the Upper West Side of Manhattan, New York City, within the Central Park West Historic District. The Beaux-Arts building was designed by architect Frederick R. Comstock and constructed in 1899–1901.

In 2003, Second Church of Christ, Scientist merged with First Church of Christ, Scientist, whose building at 96th Street was later sold to the Crenshaw Christian Center. The merged congregation uses the name First Church of Christ, Scientist and worships at the former Second Church on 68th Street.

The building was restored beginning in 2005 by Sydness Architects, which planned to clean the facade, reinforce the stained-glass windows, and waterproof the copper dome and illuminate the skylight.
