= Gillian Gill =

Welsh-American writer and academic

- Born: Gillian Catherine Scobie; June 12, 1942 (age 84); Cardiff, Wales
- Education: Cardiff High School for Girls; New Hall, Cambridge University
- Occupations: Writer; academic
- Spouse: D. Michael Gill (m. 1965)
- Children: 2
- Parent(s): William E. Scobie; Esme C. Scobie

Gillian Catherine Gill (née Scobie, born June 12, 1942) is a Welsh-American writer and academic who specializes in biography. She is the author of Agatha Christie: The Woman and Her Mysteries (1990); Mary Baker Eddy (1998); Nightingales: The Extraordinary Upbringing and Curious Life of Miss Florence Nightingale (2004); We Two: Victoria and Albert, Rulers, Partners, Rivals (2009) and Virginia Woolf: And the Women Who Shaped Her World (2019).

Born Gillian Catherine Scobie in Cardiff, Wales to William E. and Esme C. Scobie, Gill attended Cardiff High School for Girls and graduated from New Hall at the University of Cambridge with a first-class honours degree in French, Italian, and Latin. In March 1972, she obtained her Ph.D., also from Cambridge, for her thesis André Malraux: A Study of a Novelist. After marrying, she emigrated to the United States and taught at Northeastern University, Wellesley, Harvard, and Yale, where she was a fellow of Jonathan Edwards College and director of the Women's Studies Program.

Gill served as executive director of the Alliance of Independent Scholars, a member of board of directors for National Coalition of Independent Scholars, and is a member of the Modern Language Association of America. She was a National Endowment for the Humanities fellow from 1981 to 1983.

She married D. Michael Gill, a biochemist and university professor, on April 10, 1965. They had two children, Christopher and Catherine. She lives in the Boston area.

== Works ==
Biographies

- Agatha Christie: The Woman and Her Mysteries, Free Press, 1990.
- Mary Baker Eddy, Perseus Books, 1998.
- Nightingales: The Extraordinary Upbringing and Curious Life of Miss Florence Nightingale, Random House, 2004.
- We Two: Victoria and Albert, Rulers, Partners, Rivals, Ballantine Books, 2009.
- Virginia Woolf: And the Women Who Shaped Her World, Houghton Mifflin Harcourt, 2019.

Translations

- Luce Irigaray, Speculum of the Other Woman, Cornell University Press, 1985.
- Luce Irigaray, Marine Lover of Friedrich Nietzsche, Columbia University Press, 1991.
- Luce Irigaray, An Ethics of Sexual Difference, Cornell University Press, 1993.
- Luce Irigaray, Sexes and Genealogies, Columbia University Press, 1993.
- Lucienne Frappier-Mazur, Writing the Orgy: Power and Parody in Sade, University of Pennsylvania Press, 1996.
