= Science and Health with Key to the Scriptures =

Holy text of Christian Science

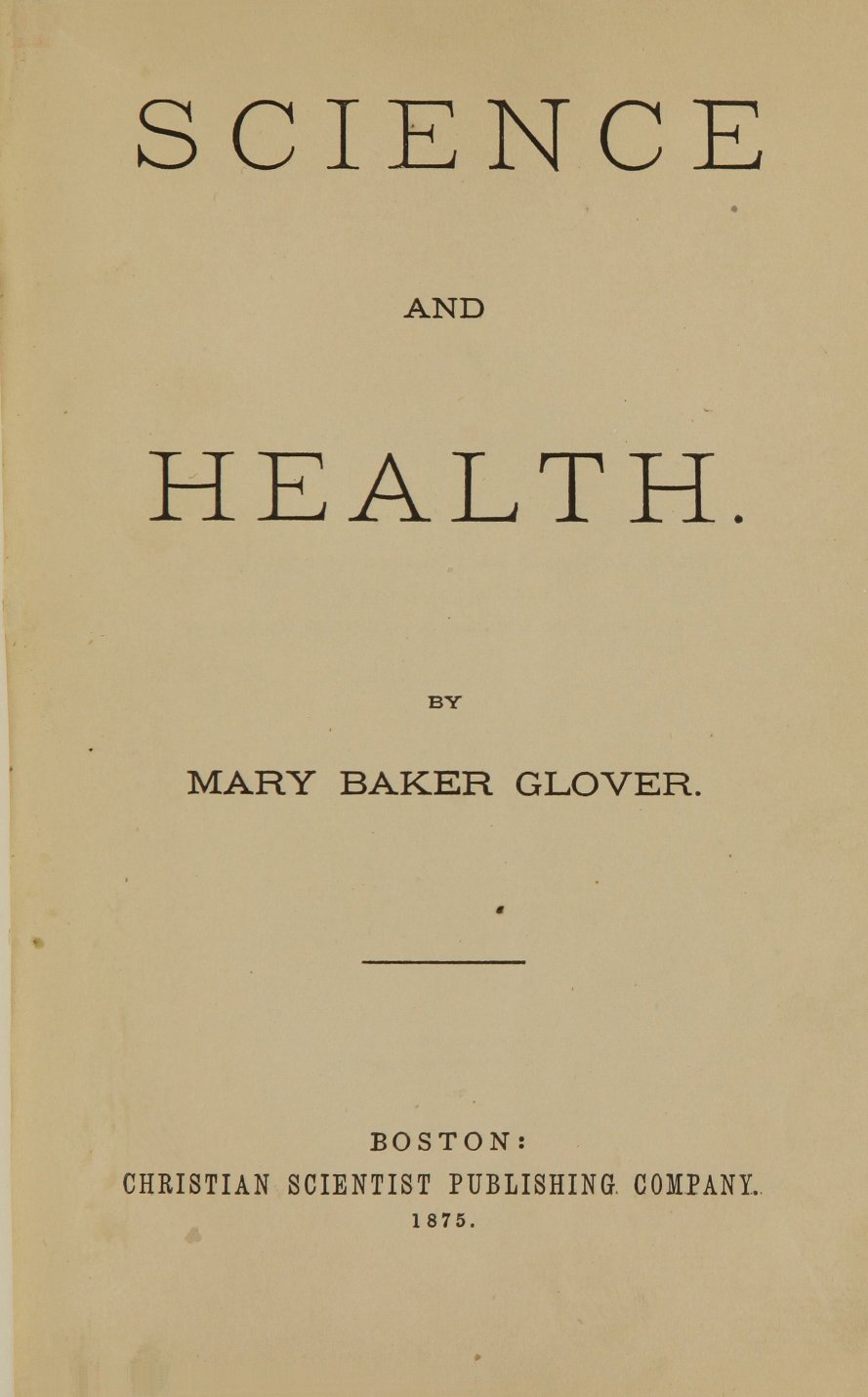
- First edition of Science and Health (1875)
- Author: Mary Baker Eddy (Note: The first edition in 1875 was published under the name Mary Baker Glover, Glover's name changed to Mary Baker Eddy with her marriage to Asa Gilbert Eddy.)
- Language: English
- Publisher: Christian Science Publishing Co.
- Publication date: 1875 (first edition); 1910 (final edition)
- Publication place: US
- Media type: Print
- Text: Science and Health with Key to the Scriptures at Wikisource

Science and Health with Key to the Scriptures by Mary Baker Eddy is, along with the Bible, one of two central texts of the Christian Science religion. Eddy described it as her "most important work." She began writing it in February 1872, and the first edition was published in 1875. She would continue editing it and adding to it for the rest of her life.

The book was selected as one of the "75 Books By Women Whose Words Have Changed The World", by the Women's National Book Association.

In 2001 the book had sold over nine million copies, and as of 2024, it eclipsed ten million copies.

== Overview ==
Christian Science develops its theology and its healing method in Science and Health and defines God as "incorporeal, divine, supreme, infinite Mind, Spirit, Soul, Principle, Life, Truth, Love". Eddy saw Jesus' healing work as a divinely natural and repeatable science. According to Stephen Gottschalk, Eddy "saw the healing ministry of Christian Science as helping to rouse Christians to the great promise of restoring the power of the original Gospel."

Science and Health encapsulates the teachings of Christian Science and adherents often call it their "textbook." At Sunday services, the sermon consists of passages from the Bible with correlative passages from Science and Health. Eddy called the two books Christian Science's "dual and impersonal pastor."

== Structure ==
The scientific statement of being

There is no life, truth, intelligence, nor substance in matter. All is infinite Mind and its infinite manifestation, for God is All-in-all. Spirit is immortal Truth; matter is mortal error. Spirit is the real and eternal; matter is the unreal and temporal. Spirit is God, and man is His image and likeness. Therefore man is not material; he is spiritual.

— Mary Baker Eddy,

The last edition of the book consists of a short preface, the main section, a "Key to the Scriptures" section, and a Fruitage section. Some editions include a word index.

Main section

The main section is 500 pages long and comprises chapters titled as follows:

- Chapter I: Prayer
- Chapter II: Atonement and Eucharist
- Chapter III: Marriage
- Chapter IV: Christian Science versus Spiritualism
- Chapter V: Animal Magnetism Unmasked
- Chapter VI: Science, Theology, Medicine
- Chapter VII: Physiology
- Chapter VIII: Footsteps of Truth
- Chapter IX: Creation
- Chapter X: Science of Being
- Chapter XI: Some Objections Answered
- Chapter XII: Christian Science Practice — which explains how healing is undertaken
- Chapter XIII: Teaching Christian Science
- Chapter XIV: Recapitulation — the text used for class instruction in Christian Science healing.

Key to the Scriptures

This section is 100 pages long, and comprises:

- Chapter XV: Genesis — a detailed analysis of the two versions of the creation story given in the book of Genesis
- Chapter XVI: The Apocalypse — an analysis of parts of the book of Revelation
- Chapter XVII: Glossary — giving the spiritual meaning of 114 Biblical terms

Fruitage

- Chapter XVIII: Fruitage — This section is 100 pages long and consists of 84 testimonies of the healing power derived from reading Science and Health. There are descriptions of healings of addiction, asthma, broken bones, cataracts, cancer, deafness, eczema, fibroid tumor, and rheumatism. Prior intervention by physicians is mentioned in 50 of these cases, and one relates a confirmatory X-ray image by a physician. Marietta T. Webb, one of the first African Americans listed in The Christian Science Journal as a practitioner, wrote one of the testimonies included.

== Copyright ==
The first edition was copyrighted by Eddy in 1875, in part to help separate her work from the "sea of metaphysical writing" circulating at the time. The copyright for Science and Health went through several renewals including a posthumous renewal in 1934 by the Christian Science Board of Directors. In December 1971, Congress passed a law extending the copyright on Science and Health by 75 years to the Christian Science Board of Directors. There was some opposition to the bill, as it would prevent dissident groups from publishing their own edited versions of the book.

In 1985 however, following a legal suit brought by United Christian Scientists, a group which wanted to publish their own version of the book, the copyright extension was found unconstitutional by Federal District Judge Thomas Penfield Jackson. In 1987 the United States Court of Appeals for the District of Columbia upheld the ruling of the district court. As a result, Science and Health has been in the public domain since 1987.

== Editions ==
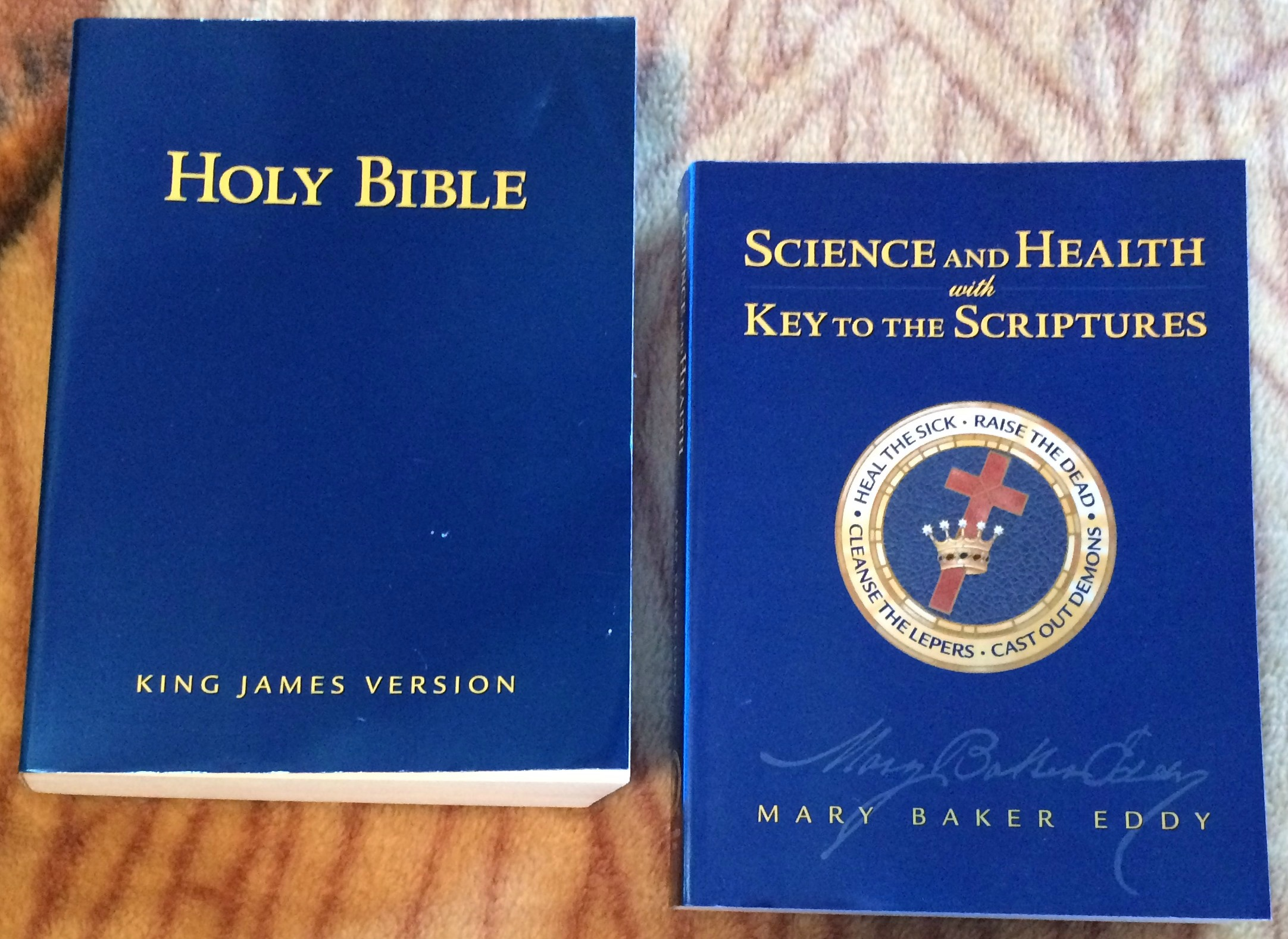
The Bible (left) and Science and Health (right)

The first edition was published in 1875 by Eddy, who was then in her mid-fifties and known as Mary Baker Glover. It was printed by W.F. Brown & Co. Their invoice for 1,000 copies, dated October 30, 1875, was made out to George M. Barry and Edward Hitchins for US$2,285.35. The edition consisted of 456 pages, plus 2 pages of errata. However, there were hundreds of typographic errors, some because the printer, not understanding the author's meaning, had tried to correct the wording without consulting her. The second edition, printed by Rand, Avery & Co, appeared in 1878, with 167 pages of new material. It was called Science and Health Volume 2 to indicate that it was a supplement to the first edition, but it, too, was full of typographic errors. Finally, the third edition printed by John Wilson at the University Press in Cambridge, Massachusetts, was of a high standard. Twelve further two-volume editions followed, before the 16th edition appeared as a single volume in 1886. This edition of the book had 552 pages, plus an index of 38 pages, and "with Key to the Scriptures" had been added to the title. Eddy remained loyal to the University Press for the rest of her life, and in 1897 even made a substantial investment to save it from bankruptcy.

Eddy closed her Massachusetts Metaphysical College and left Boston in 1889, in order to revise the text for the 50th edition (1891). This edition consisted of 578 pages plus a 73-page index, and for the first time included marginal headings. The 226th "thousand" edition appeared in 1902, and included the chapter "Fruitage," making up the page count of 700 pages which remains to this day. The last numbered edition was the 418th, which appeared in 1906, but further changes were made until 1910. According to the Mary Baker Eddy Library, major editions include those printed in 1875, 1878, 1881, 1883, 1886, 1891, 1902, and 1907.

In writing about the first edition of Science and Health, feminist scholar and biographer Gillian Gill homes in on this point: "The real issue is the author's audacity, her daring to think that a woman like her, with her resources, could write, not the expected textbook on mental healing techniques, not the comfortable compendium of healing anecdotes, but a book that takes on the great questions of God and man, good and evil, and that rejects orthodox verities."

== Sources ==
- Gill, Gillian (1998). Mary Baker Eddy. Perseus Books. ISBN 978-0738202273.
- Gottschalk, Stephen (2006). Rolling Away the Stone: Mary Baker Eddy's Challenge to Materialism. Indiana University Press. ISBN 9780253346735.
- Hall, Irene (1 September 2007). "Mary Baker Eddy and Christian Science". Feminist Theology. 16 (1): 79–88. doi:10.1177/0966735007082518. ISSN 0966-7350.
- McCrackan, William D. (1925). Mary Baker Eddy And Her Book: Science and Health with Key to the Scriptures. M. E. Starr.
- Ventimiglia, Andrew (2018). Copyrighting God: Ownership of the Sacred in American Religion. Cambridge University Press. ISBN 9781108420518.
