= Reader (Christian Science Church) =

Elected religious position in Christian Science

A Reader in a Christian Science church is a member of the congregation who has been elected to serve in one of two positions responsible for church services. Each week's sermon in Christian Science churches is outlined in the Christian Science Quarterly, prepared months in advance, and is the same in all Christian Science churches, worldwide. As a lay church, the congregation elects readers from the congregation and they serve as readers for a set period of time. The sermons consist of passages from the Bible (usually the King James Version) and Science and Health with Key to the Scriptures by Mary Baker Eddy, and are studied as lessons during the week and read aloud to the congregation on the Sunday following. The readers are referred to as the First Reader and Second Reader, according to the order in which they initially speak during the Sunday services. First Readers also conduct the Wednesday evening testimony meetings.

== Duties of Readers ==
The Christian Science church was established as a lay church by founder Mary Baker Eddy. The principal responsibilities of Readers in Christian Science churches are established in the Manual of The Mother Church, written by Eddy. The Mother Church and its "branch churches" around the world each have two Readers, who are referred to simply as First Reader and Second Reader, according to the order in which they initially speak during the Sunday service.

The Manual gives the First Reader more responsibilities than Second Reader. The First Reader selects the hymns; chooses and reads the "Scriptural Selection", a brief prelude to the sermon, and the benediction, also from the Bible; makes announcements; and reads aloud the Sermon's citations from Science and Health with Key to the Scriptures, by Mary Baker Eddy. The Second Reader reads from the Bible and leads the congregation in audible repetition of the Lord's Prayer. No personal comment about the lesson-sermon is offered, but an "Explanatory Note" printed in Quarterly is read before the lesson-sermon is begun.

In addition, the First Reader conducts weekly Wednesday evening meetings, selecting and reading passages from both books on a topic as he or she is inspired. First Readers are to select their own passages, not using previous lesson-sermons or others' readings. The Second Reader has no role in the meeting, but attends the meeting as any other member or visitor.

Readers are required by the Manual to "devote a suitable portion of their time to preparation for the reading of the Sunday lesson" and they are required to "keep themselves unspotted from the world,— uncontaminated with evil, — that the mental atmosphere they exhale shall promote health and holiness, even that spiritual animus so universally needed." Article III, Section 4 of the Manual prohibits Readers from reading from anything but the actual books, however, in the February 2012 Christian Science Journal, the Board of Directors, the administrative body for the organization, worldwide, implied that this practice was mere "tradition" and "human regulation" and churches did not have to be adhere to the by-law. As a result, some Readers now read from a monthly version of the Quarterly, in which the lesson-sermon is printed in its entirety, rather than outlined.

== Appointment and status in church ==
Mother Church Readers are selected by the five-member Board of Directors; branch churches elect their own readers from the entire membership. Mother Church Readers serve for three-year terms; branch church Readers' terms of office depend on the by-laws adopted by that branch church. There are no campaigns for Reader and there is no discussion prior to elections. Voting relies on each member's individual sense of who is most spiritually advanced. As a rule, an individual is only elected Reader once in life, but becomes a substitute for other Readers, as needed. Traditionally, former First Readers substitute only for other First Readers and Second Readers for other Second Readers. When a former Reader relocates and changes branch church membership, the new branch is informed of his or her past service, thus adding to the supply of available substitutes.

Readers are not treated as clergy; they are ordinary members and are treated as such. However, First Readers, as stipulated in the Manual, are responsible for discipline and for maintaining the tenets, rules and by-laws of their respective branch churches and all First Readers, present and former, are especially charged with oversight of Mother Church officers in case of a dereliction of "official duties". All members are charged with this oversight, but particular emphasis is placed on First Readers.

All Readers in branches of The Mother Church are required by the Manual to be Mother Church members. Mother Church membership is not otherwise required of branch church members, however most are.

== Marriages and funerals ==
Church edifices are not used for baptisms, marriages, or funerals. Readers in Christian Science churches are not authorized to officiate marriages, which must be legal. Church members may ask another denomination's clergy or Justices of the Peace to perform marriages. The Christian Science faith has no specific requirement to have funeral services or about how such services might be conducted, therefore Readers have no specific funeral duties. However, if a memorial service is desired by someone, a Reader or another Christian Scientist may select some brief passages from the Bible and Eddy's writings for such purposes.

== Pastor and preachers ==
In 1894, Mary Baker Eddy added the following ordination to the Manual:

I, Mary Baker Eddy, ordain the BIBLE, and SCIENCE AND HEALTH WITH KEY TO THE SCRIPTURES, Pastor over The Mother Church,—The First Church of Christ, Scientist, in Boston, Mass.,—and they will continue to preach for this Church and the world.

The "Explanatory Note" concerns the role of the Readers, the Bible, and Science and Health and begins with the sentence, "Friends: The Bible and the Christian Science textbook are our only preachers." Specifically, Readers in Christian Science churches are neither pastors nor preachers.
