= The Life of Mary Baker G. Eddy and the History of Christian Science =

Book by Georgine Milmine and Willa Cather

- The 1993 University of Nebraska Press cover
- Author: Georgine Milmine (1874–1950); Willa Cather (1873–1947)
- Genre: Biography, history
- Publisher: McClure's magazine (serialized: January 1907 to June 1908); Doubleday, Page & Company (November 1909); Baker Book House (1971); Bison Books, University of Nebraska Press (1993)
- Publication place: United States
- Pages: 566 (first edition)
- ISBN: 0-8032-6349-X
- OCLC: 150493
- Website: Text available at the Internet Archive

The Life of Mary Baker G. Eddy and the History of Christian Science (1909) is a highly critical account of the life of Mary Baker Eddy, the founder of Christian Science, and the early history of the Christian Science church in 19th-century New England. It was published as a book in November 1909 in New York by Doubleday, Page & Company. The original byline was that of a journalist, Georgine Milmine, but a 1993 printing of the book declared that novelist Willa Cather was the principal author; however, this assessment has been questioned by more recent scholarship which again identifies Milmine as the primary author, although Cather and others did significant editing. Cather herself usually wrote that she did nothing more than standard copy-editing, but sometimes that she was the primary author.

One of the first major examinations of Eddy's life and work, along with Sibyl Wilbur's articles in Human Life magazine, the material initially appeared in McClure's magazine in 14 installments between January 1907 and June 1908, when Eddy was 85 years old, preceded in December 1906 by a six-page editorial in which McClure's announced the series as "probably as near absolute accuracy as history ever gets". In the early 20th century, Christian Science became the fastest growing religion in America, and in the view of McClure's, Eddy was the most powerful woman in the country. The McClure's eyewitness accounts and affidavits became key primary sources for many accounts of Eddy and the church's early history.

The magazine's publisher and editor-in-chief, S. S. McClure, assigned three writers to work on the articles in addition to Cather and Milmine: William Henry Irwin, McClure's managing editor; and staff writers Burton J. Hendrick and Mark Sullivan. Briefly, the famed journalist Ida Tarbell was assigned to the project but left the magazine before it started. The 1909 book was republished by Baker Book House in 1971 after its copyright had expired, and again in 1993 by the University of Nebraska Press, this time naming both Cather and Milmine as authors. David Stouck, in his introduction to the University of Nebraska Press edition, wrote that Cather's portrayal of Eddy "contains some of the finest portrait sketches and reflections on human nature that Willa Cather would ever write".

A review in The New York Times wrote in 1910 that the book's evidence against "Eddyism" was "unanswerable and conclusive". However, more recent scholarship has questioned the accuracy and trustworthiness of the series and book. In 2017, scholar L. Ashley Squires wrote: "Christian Science remains poorly understood by the broader scholarly community and the public as a whole. One need only look to the frustratingly enduring usage of the 1907 McClure's biography as an authoritative source ... for evidence of scholarly ignorance."

== Christian Science ==
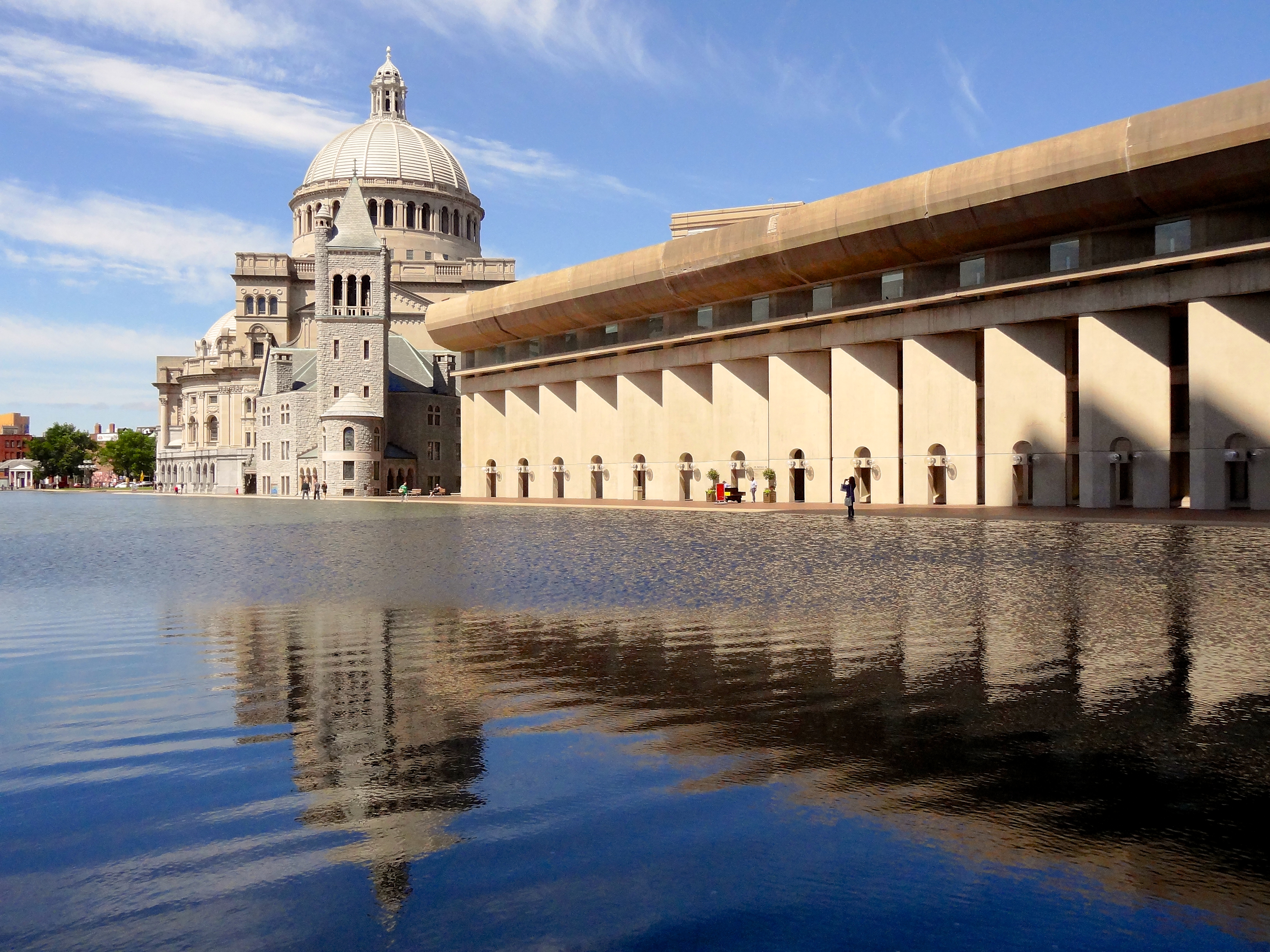
The First Church of Christ, Scientist, Boston, Massachusetts

Eddy and 26 followers founded the Christian Science church in 1879 in Boston, Massachusetts, following the publication of her book Science and Health with Key to the Scriptures in 1875. In her book, Eddy outlined what she felt was the "law" or "Science" of God, which she named Christian Science. (Note: Mary Baker Eddy: "[Q:] How would you define Christian Science? [A:] As the law of God, the law of good, interpreting and demonstrating the divine Principle and rule of universal harmony.") Eddy believed Christian Science was provable through demonstration, specifically of healing through prayer. She did not believe that her ideas were new however, instead, the church sought to "reinstate primitive Christianity and its lost element of healing" which she believed that Jesus had taught.

Christian Science at the time was the fastest growing religion in the United States. The church had 27 members in 1879, and 65,717 in 1906 when McClure's began its research. (Note: Christian Science as a religion entered a period of continuous decline after World War II.) In 1890 there were just seven Christian Science churches in the US; by 1910, a few years after the McClure's article, there were 1,104. Construction of the Mother Church, The First Church of Christ, Scientist, was completed in Boston in December 1894, and in 1906 the Mother Church Extension, rising 224 ft (68 m) and accommodating nearly 5,000, was built at a cost of $2 million (equivalent to $71.67 million in 2025), donated by Christian Scientists around the world. Art historian Paul Ivey writes that, for many, the building "visibly declared that Christian Science had, indeed, arrived as a major force in American religious life". The rapid rise of Christian Science as a religious movement created a significant backlash, and although not all media was antagonistic towards Eddy and Christian Scientists many were, most notably The New York World and McClure's.

== Publication ==
=== McClure's articles ===
The McClure's articles were published in 14 installments between January 1907 and June 1908, under Georgine Milmine's byline, as "Mary Baker G. Eddy: The Story of Her Life and the History of Christian Science". The series was preceded by a seven-page editorial in December 1906, outlining the difficulties of the investigation and explaining why it was being published. The editorial printed a picture of an older women, which it claimed was Eddy, stating that "[o]ther photographs taken in later years have been greatly retouched" and that Eddy was more aged than her followers were led to believe. However, this claim got the series off to a rough start when it was found out that the picture was actually an elderly lady living in Brooklyn unrelated to Eddy.

The article attacked Christian Science, referring to it as a cult based on a "hazy and obscure" book, it continued: "A church which has doubled its membership in five years, which draws its believers mostly from the rich and respectable ... and which has just paid for the most costly church building in New England—to the worldly, this is no longer a joke... In 1875 no one living outside of two or three back streets of Lynn had heard of Christian Science. Now, the very name is a catch phrase. In those early days the leader and teacher paid out half of her ten dollars a week to hire a hall, patching out the rest of her living with precarious fees as an instructor in mental healing; now, she is one of the richest women in the United States. She is more than that—she is the most powerful American woman." The editorial preemptively accused Christian Scientists of opposition to the work: "The Christian Science mind is unfriendly to independent investigation. It presupposes that anything even slightly unfavorable to Mrs. Eddy or to Christian Science is deliberate falsehood."

=== Synopsis ===
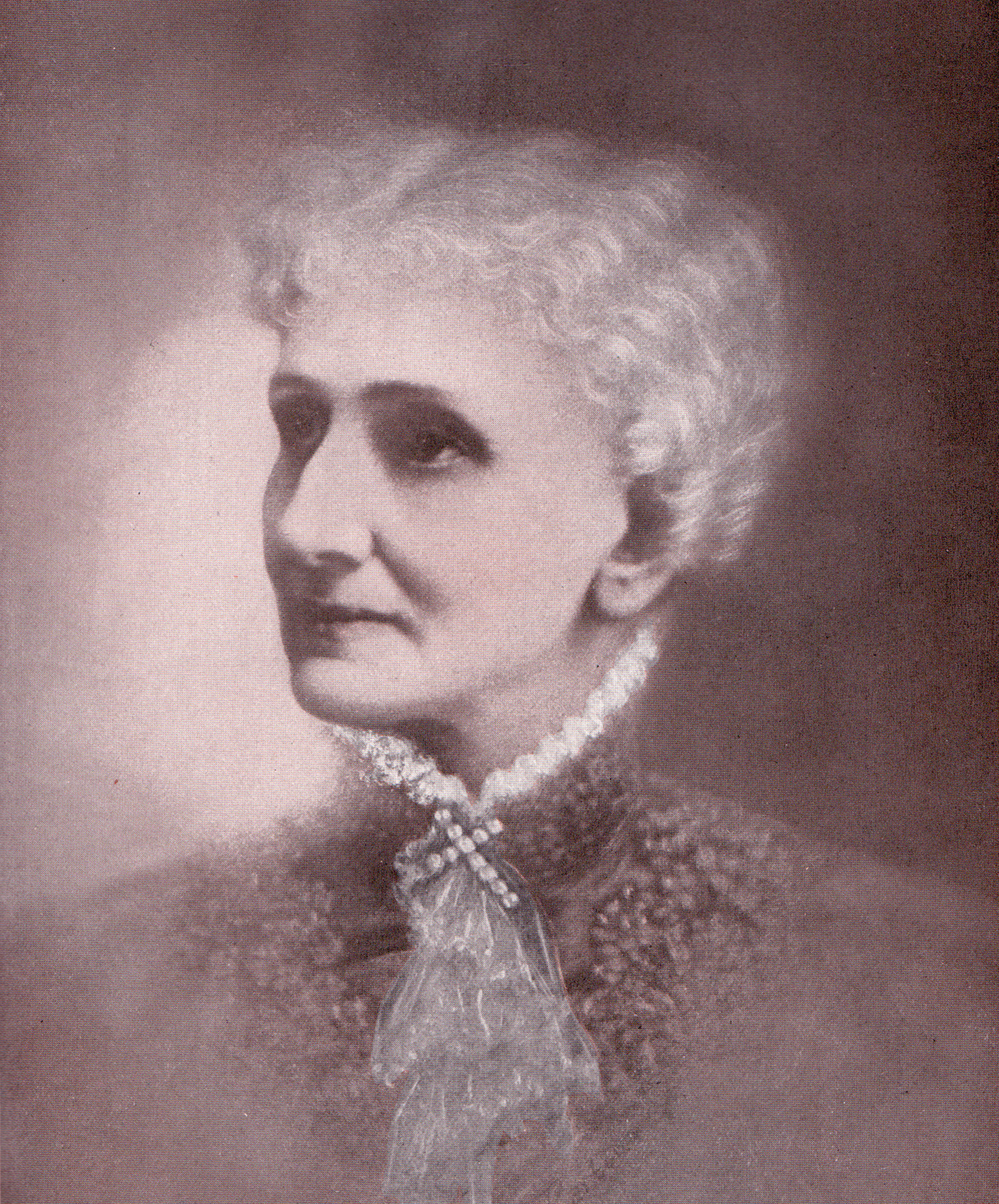
Mary Baker Eddy at the time of the McClure's articles

The book's criticism of Eddy is considerable. According to Stuart Knee: "Eddy is, by turns, guilty of vanity, ignorance, theft, vengefulness, compulsions, witchcraft, mesmerism and the evil eye." The authors of the series produced witness statements from Eddy's childhood in Bow, New Hampshire, alleging that she engaged in repeated fainting spells to gain attention, particularly from her father, and that, as an adult, she developed a habit of appearing to be seriously ill only to recover quickly. (Note: Cather and Milmine (1993): "These attacks, which continued until very late in Mrs. Eddy's life, have been described to the writer by many eye-witnesses, some of whom have watched by her bedside and treated her in Christian Science for her affliction. At times the attack resembled convulsions. Mary fell headlong to the floor, writhing and screaming in apparent agony. ... At home the family worked over her, and the doctor was sent for, and Mary invariably recovered rapidly after a few hours; but year after year her relatives fully expected that she would die in one of these spasms.") Biographer Gillian Gill disagreed that the book offers an accurate portrayal of Eddy; she argued, for example, that the story of Eddy having "fits" as a child to get her own way, or the way McClure's described them, was "invented more or less out of whole cloth" by McClure's journalist Burton Hendrick, and that the accounts of Eddy as "hysterical" were misogynist. She wrote: "there is no solid evidence at all for Milmine's melodramatic description of the young Mary Baker repeatedly falling on the floor in hysterical catatonic fits. No family member, no close friend makes any mention of such fits, either when she was young or later. When questioned on the subject in the 1900s, those few remaining contemporaries who had been familiar with the Baker family denied that Mary had shown any such abnormal behavior."

The articles offer examples of Eddy's "marital, maternal, and domestic inadequacies." Most notably the loss of her son: Eddy was widowed when she was 22 years old and pregnant, after which she returned to live in her father's home. Her son was raised there for the first few years of his life, looked after by domestic staff because of Eddy's poor health. McClure's alleges that she allowed him to be adopted when he was four. According to Eddy, she was unable to prevent the adoption. (Note: Mary Baker Eddy (1891): "A few months before my father's second marriage ... my little son, about four years of age, was sent away from me, and put under the care of our family nurse, who had married, and resided in the northern part of New Hampshire. I had no training for self-support, and my home I regarded as very precious. The night before my child was taken from me, I knelt by his side throughout the dark hours, hoping for a vision of relief from this trial. ... "My dominant thought in marrying again was to get back my child, but after our marriage his stepfather was not willing he should have a home with me. A plot was consummated for keeping us apart. The family to whose care he was committed very soon removed to what was then regarded as the Far West. "After his removal a letter was read to my little son, informing him that his mother was dead and buried. Without my knowledge a guardian was appointed him, and I was then informed that my son was lost. Every means within my power was employed to find him, but without success.") Women in the United States at the time could not be their own children's guardians, per the legal doctrine of coverture. (Note: Harvard Business School, 2010: "A married woman or feme covert was a dependent, like an underage child or a slave, and could not own property in her own name or control her own earnings, except under very specific circumstances. When a husband died, his wife could not be the guardian to their under-age children.")

Her next two marriages, lifelong poor health, and the numerous legal actions in which she was involved, are examined in detail—including lawsuits she supposedly initiated against her students; a criminal case in which her husband Asa Eddy was arrested for murdering one of them (Asa Eddy was released when it was found the student had faked his death); her belief that her former students killed Asa Eddy by using "mental malpractice"; and her legal adoption of a 41-year-old student and former homeopath when she was 67. The authors allege that Eddy's major work, Science and Health with Key to the Scriptures, which became Christian Science's main religious text, borrowed heavily from the work of Phineas Parkhurst Quimby, a New England faith healer. Quimby had treated Eddy in the years before his death and According to McClure's had given her some of his unpublished notes. The series and book discuss the alleged rewrites of Science and Health by her editor James Henry Wiggin, who served as a proofreader of the book from the 16th edition in 1886 until the 50th in 1891, including the 22 editions that appeared between 1886 and 1888.

== Authorship ==
=== Initial research and Georgine Milmine's involvement ===
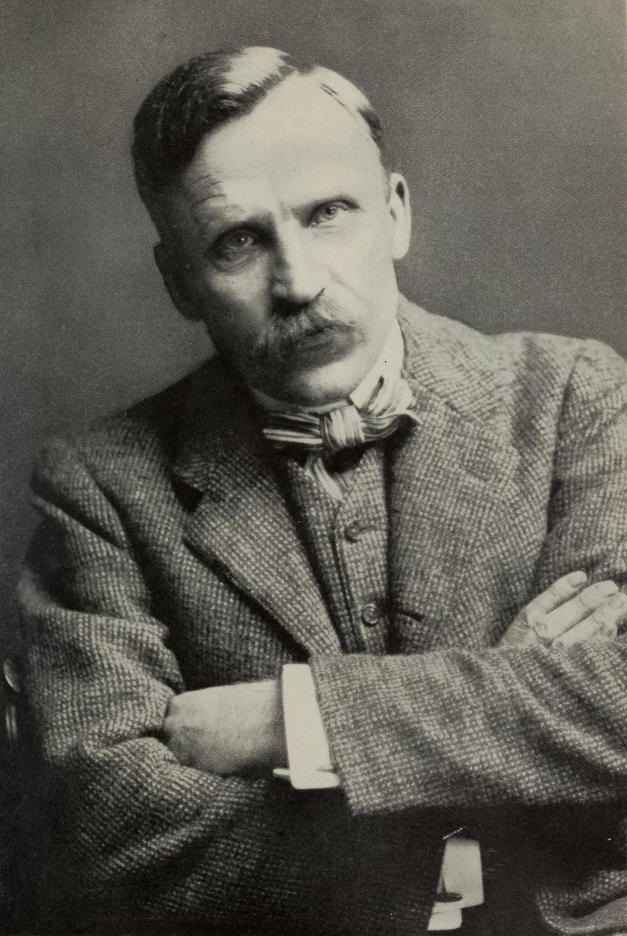
S. S. McClure, McClure's publisher and editor-in-chief

Born in Ontario, Canada, Georgine Milmine Welles, who went by her maiden name Georgine Milmine, had worked for the Syracuse Herald as a proofreader and had done some journalistic work. She wanted to write a 12-part monthly series on famous women in American, including Eddy, and had gone to Eddy's home to ask for an interview but was denied. She then went to Josephine Woodbury and Frederick Peabody, fierce critics of Eddy, and Peabody especially became extremely influential to Milmine's research and her views of Eddy; and Peabody was actually hired later on by McClure's to collect affidavits. For a number of years she collected material about Eddy for years—newspaper articles from the 1880s, court records, and a first edition of Science and Health, all of which were hard to obtain—but lacked the resources to check and write it up herself, so she sold it to McClure's. There is documented evidence that a number of Milmine's sources were paid to give their testimony.

S. S. McClure assigned five writers to the story: Milmine, Willa Cather, Burton J. Hendrick, political columnist Mark Sullivan, and William Henry Irwin. When the series was suggested, the journalist Ida Tarbell was also involved, but she left before the series began and had "little or nothing" to do with it. Cather had recently started working at McClure's as a fiction editor in 1906 when she was 32 years; she worked there until 1912, for most of the time as managing editor. Cather reportedly spent from December 1906 until May 1908 in Boston, checking the sources and writing up the research. The journalist Elizabeth Shepley Sergeant, a friend of Cather's, wrote in 1953 that S. S. McClure saw Eddy as a "natural" for the magazine, because of her marital history and idiosyncrasies: "The material was touchy, and would attract a world of readers both of the faithful and the doubters. ... The job seemed to [Cather] a little infra dig, not on the level where she cared to move. But she inspired confidence, had the mind of a judge and the nose of a detective when she needed it."

=== Willa Cather's involvement ===
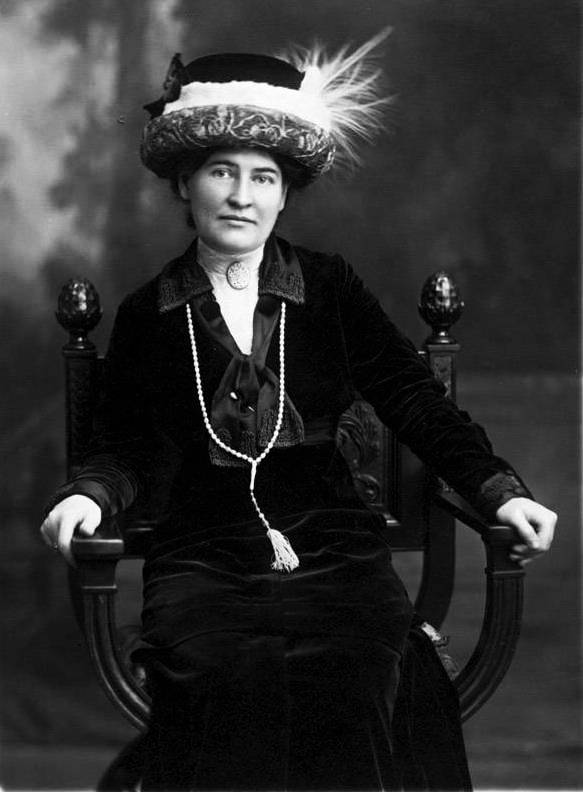
Willa Cather, c. 1912

==== Manuscript ====
The Christian Science church purchased the book's manuscript and has made it available at the church's Mary Baker Eddy Library in Boston. According to David Stouck, professor emeritus of English at Simon Fraser University and author of several books on Willa Cather, Cather's handwriting is evident on the manuscript in edits for the typesetter and notes with queries. Several of Cather's later characters appear to have been modeled on her portrait of Eddy, including Myra Henshawe in My Mortal Enemy (1926).

Reluctant to discuss most of her work before O Pioneers! (1913), Cather told her father and close friends that she was the author of Life of Mary Baker G. Eddy but told others that her role had not been significant. According to L. Brent Bohlke of Bard College, editor of Willa Cather in Person (1990), Cather regarded the Eddy book as poorly written. While it contains some excellent writing and character analysis, Bohlke wrote, it is not well-structured; the editing failed to rid the book of the serialized nature of the McClure's pieces. Cather wanted to distance herself from journalism, and according to Stouck sought to minimize her role in the articles because they had angered the Christian Science church.

According to Gillian Gill, McClure's decision to run the series under Milmine's name was probably influenced by the fact that "it would be better for an attack on a famous woman to come from an unknown young independent female reporter rather than from their own staff, who had something of a reputation for putting sensationalism ahead of accuracy." Gill also noted that Milmine's supposed authorship became important to many critics of the church, especially Edwin Franden Dakin, who according to Gill was "almost apocalyptic in his enthusiasm" for Milmine and the book. (Note: Edwin Franden Dakin, 1929: "Until the close of 1906 the world at large had really known nothing whatever about her [i.e., Mrs. Eddy] except that information she herself had chosen to supply. Suddenly, however, the temple veils were rent. Whole rivers of unexplained facts started to flow.") Gill wrote further:

"As I see it, Georgine Milmine is here being recast in the image of the real-life Ida Tarbell and other famous pioneer women reporters. By the early twentieth century, the American public had grown to appreciate the story of the plucky girl reporter who hits pay dirt after much digging and writes a crackerjack book. This story was so much more romantic and appealing than the life of the real Mrs. Welles, who, as far as can now be determined, was fed a lot of material by interested parties, proved smart enough to take it to New York, but did not have the ability to write it up herself. Behind the unknown and subtly mythical Georgine Milmine we find the well-known staff of McClure's, and behind the magazine loom the ghostly figures of the strongly implicated Woodbury and the avowedly prejudiced Peabody. How ironic it is that plagiarism is one of the most damning accusations Georgine Milmine laid against Mrs. Eddy, yet Milmine herself wrote little if any of the book which bears her name."

==== Early letters ====
Cather identified herself as the author on December 17, 1906, in a letter to her father, Charles F. Cather, in which she wrote that the articles beginning February 1907 (at the time written but not published) were hers. Apologizing for being unable to come home for Christmas, she explained that she had to get the March article ready: "But if you were here, my father, you'd tell me to stand by my job and not to desert Mr. McClure in this crisis. It would mean such a serious loss to him in money and influence not to have the March article come out—Everyone would think he was beaten and scared out, for the articles are under such a glare of publicity and such a fire of criticism. I had nothing to do with the January article remember, my work begins to appear in February. Mr. McClure is ill from worry and anxiety ...". She referred to her authorship again in a letter to the writer Harrison G. Dwight on January 12, 1907:

Mr. McClure tried three men on this disagreeable task, but none of them did it very well, so a month ago it was thrust upon me. You may imagine me wandering around the country grubbing among newspaper files and court records for the next five months. It is the most laborious and sordid work I have ever come upon, and it takes every hour of my time and as much vitality as I can put into it.

She continued: "You can't know, never having done it, how such work does sap your poor brain and wring it dry of anything you'd like to pretend was there. I jump about like a squirrel in a cage and wonder how I got here and why I am doing it. I never in my life wanted to do this sort of thing. I have a clean conscience on that score. Then why am I hammering away at it, I'd like to know? I often wonder whether I shall ever write another line of anything I care to."

==== Letter to Edwin Anderson ====
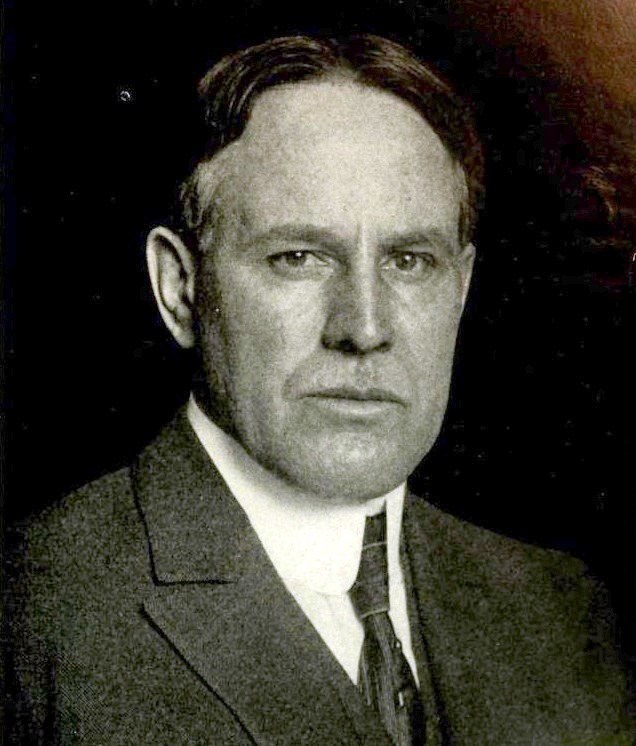
Edwin H. Anderson, director of the New York Public Library, 1909–1934

In 1982 Brent L. Bohlke discovered that Cather had written on November 24, 1922, to a friend, Edwin H. Anderson, director of the New York Public Library, which seemed to confirm that she was the author of the entire book except for the first chapter. Georgine Miline had brought the research to McClure's, she wrote, "a splendid collection of material", but Milmine lacked the technical skills to write it up:

Mr. McClure tried out three or four people at writing the story. It was a sort of competition. He liked my version the best chiefly because it was unprejudiced—I haven't the slightest bone to pick with Christian Science. This was when I first came to New York, and that piece of writing was the first important piece of work I did for magazines. After I finished it, I became Managing Editor.

Burton J. Hendrick (who went to work for the book's publisher, Doubleday, founded in 1897 as Doubleday & McClure Company) had written the first installment, Cather told Anderson, but it had been based largely on rumor: "with what envious people and jealous relatives remember of Mrs. Eddy's early youth". She said Hendrick was "very much annoyed at being called off the job and never forgave Mr. McClure". As for the other 13 installments: "A great deal of time and money were spent on authenticating all the material, and with the exception of the first chapter, I think the whole history is as authentic and accurate as human performances ever are." She added: "Miss Milmine, now Mrs. Wells, is in the awkward position of having her name attached to a book, of which she didn't write a word."

Cather believed Frank Nelson Doubleday, Doubleday's co-founder, should have promoted the book more: "Undoubtedly, Doubleday has perfectly good business reasons for keeping the book out of print. There has been a great demand for it to which he has been consistently blank. You see nobody took any interest in its fate. I wrote it myself as a sort of discipline, an exercise. I wouldn't fight for it; it's not the least in my line." She asked Anderson to keep what she had told him confidential: "I have never made a statement about it before, in writing or otherwise. I suppose somebody ought to know the actual truth of the matter and so long as I am writing to you about it, I might as well ask you to be the repository of these facts. I know, of course, that you want them for some perfectly good use, and will keep my name out of it."

Cather left a clause in her will forbidding the publication of her letters and private papers, which meant that for many years her letters could only be paraphrased by scholars. The correspondence entered the public domain in the United States on 1 January 2018, 70 years after her death in April 1947. Nevertheless, the Willa Cather Trust permitted the publication of selected letters in 2013, including the letter to Anderson.

==== Early public indications ====
In letters to others, Cather continued to deny her authorship; she told Genevive Richmond in 1933 and Harold Goddard Rugg in 1934 that she had helped only to organize and rewrite parts of the material. An early public suggestion of her authorship was made by the columnist Alexander Woollcott in the New Yorker in February 1933: "And speaking of ghostwriters and Mrs. Eddy, I have recently learned on almost (if not quite) the best authority in the world that the famous pathfinding predecessor of all these [Eddy] biographies—the devastating series published in McClure's under the name of Georgine Milmine in the brave days of 1906—were not actually written by Miss Milmine at all. Instead, a re-write job based on the manuscript of her researches was assigned to a minor member of the McClure staff who has since made quite a name for herself in American letters. That name is Willa Cather."

In March 1935, the Los Angeles Times reported that a copy of the book listed for sale by Philip Duschnes, a New York bookseller, was found to contain an editor's note that the book had been written by Cather. (Note: Los Angeles Times, 3 March 1935: "In the Fifteenth Catalogue of Philip Duschnes, 507 Fifth avenue, New York is listed, among many modern first editions, an item that will come as a surprise to many collectors. It seems that Miss Cather's third published book bore on its title page the name of 'Georgine Milmine'. It was "The Life of Mary Baker G. Eddy," and it appeared in 1909. In the copy offered is a photostat of a note from one of the McClure's editors to this effect.") Witter Bynner, an associate editor for McClure's when the series and book were published, had signed the book on February 12, 1934, and added: "The material was brought to McClure's by Miss Milmine, but was put into the painstaking hands of Willa Cather for proper presentation, so that a great part of it is her work."

== Responses ==
=== Initial church reaction ===
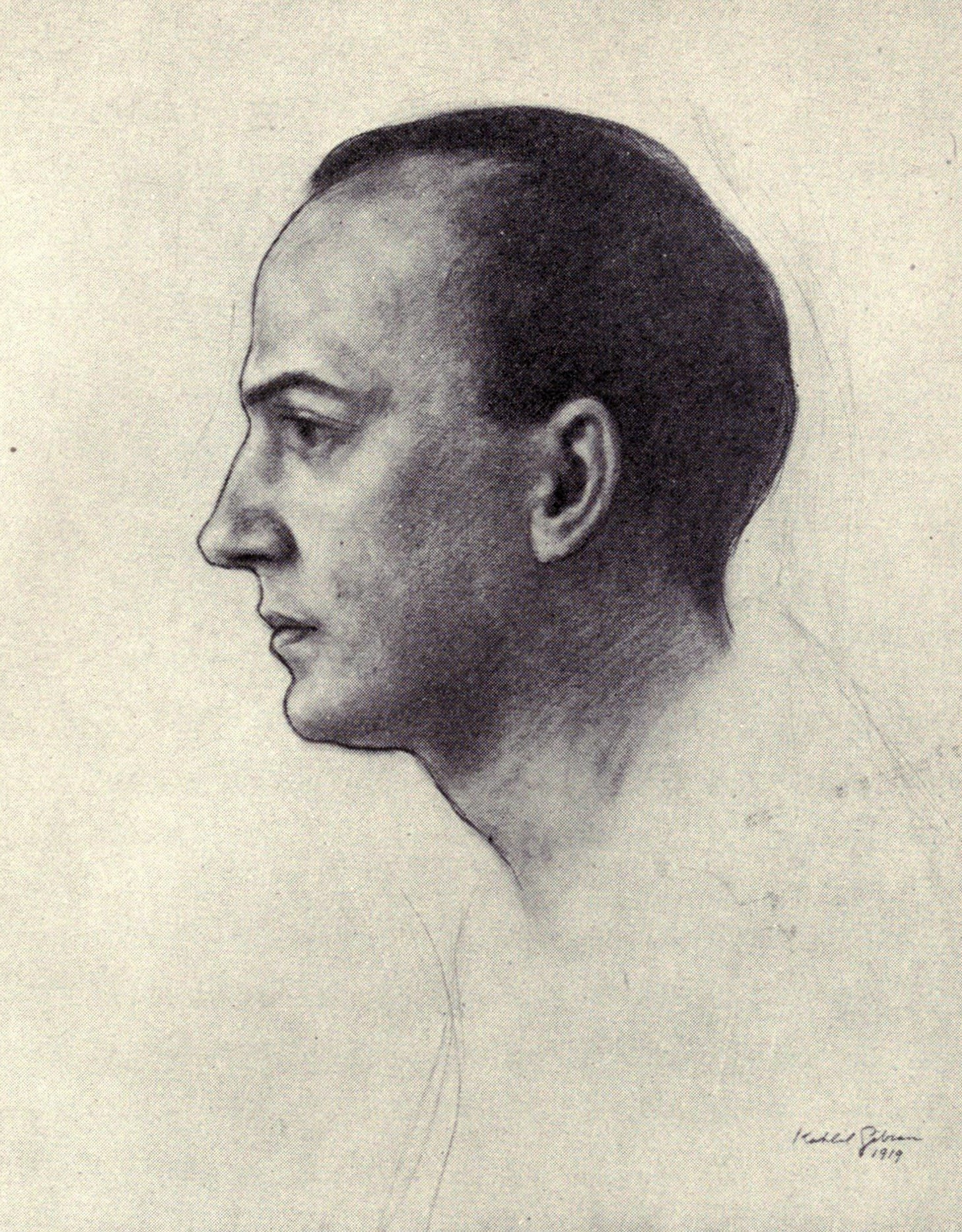
Witter Bynner, then a McClure's associate editor

By November 1904, long before the first articles appeared in the press, the Christian Science church was informed by a minister named Rev. Lord that McClure's was working on a project on Eddy comparable to Ida Tarbell's take down of Standard Oil, but, as he understood it, that they would be open to hearing from the church and printing their perspective.

S. S. McClure's grandson, Peter Lyon, in a 1963 biography of his grandfather entitled Success Story: The Life and Times of S. S. McClure, relates a story of three Christian Science officials arriving at the McClure's offices and asking an editor, Witter Bynner, to take them to McClure:

The Christian Scientists came in. Before they sat down, they stood on chairs and closed the transoms over the two doors to the rooms. Then they made their demand: the series must not be published. S.S. scowled at them and said nothing. To fill the silence, Brynner began rather nervously to assure the Scientists that the articles were not sensational, not offensive; that there was no cause for apprehension; that all the facts had been most carefully verified... One of the Scientists cut in to suggest that perhaps there would be no objection to publication of the material if the Scientists were permitted to edit it as they might please. S.S. now spoke. He flatly refused either to suppress the material or to permit the Scientists to see it in advance of publication, much less to tamper with it. "Good day, gentlemen," he said grandly, and took up some papers from his desk. The Scientists arose. One of them announced that if McClure persisted in his course he would soon notice a distinct loss of advertising in his magazine. They then marched out.

However, this narrative seems to be at least partially a fabrication, as letters from the time tell a different story. According to the letters: two men, not three, working for the church's Committee on Publication, Alfred Farlow and Cornell Wilson, first came to the office and talked with Bynner without meeting with McClure, they told him that they had heard the magazine had not called upon any Christian Scientists but it had worked extensively with critics of the church, and that they were worried the result would be prejudiced. Bynner responded that he was glad they had come, and told them he was not satisfied with the material prepared by Milmine, and offered for Farlow and Wilson to look at and edit the draft if they would like. Farlow and Wilson left happy with the result, and later returned to talk with McClure himself, but were told he was ill and rescheduled the meeting. They then met with him as scheduled the next day. There is no indication that McClure's staff tried to shield McClure from them, and it appears that it was Bynner's idea for Farlow and Wilson to look at and edit the draft, rather than the other way around. William Irwin later asked to meet with Farlow in order to get permission to get interior views of the Mother Church, and again assured him that the articles would be fair and not a "roast".

=== Mary Baker Eddy's response ===
After the first segment appeared in press, which focused mainly on her early life and family, Eddy wrote in the Christian Science Sentinel that the "attack on me and my late father and his family" compelled her "as a dutiful child" to respond. She countered many claims made by McClure's, such as its description of her father, early family life, and the issues surrounding her marriages; highlighted the educational and professional achievements of her family; provided an affidavit of her own; and ended her response by quoting Jesus: "blessed are ye, when men shall revile you, and persecute you, and shall say all manner of evil against you falsely, for my sake." She did not respond to any of the other articles publicly.

=== Sibyl Wilbur's Human Life articles ===
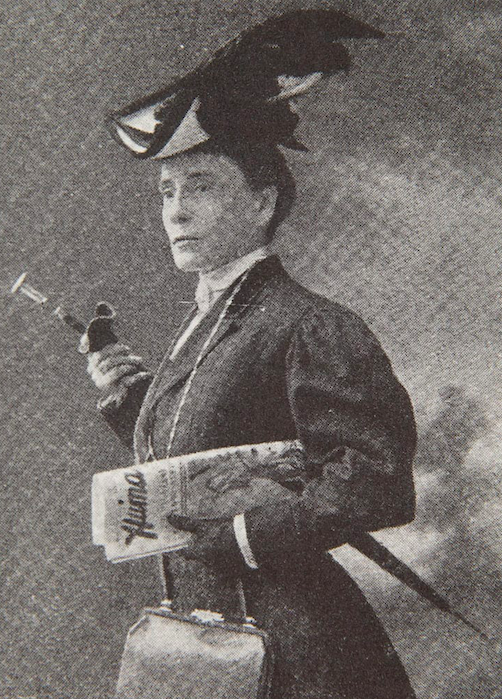
Sibyl Wilbur, author of The Life of Mary Baker Eddy, which is seen as a response to the McClure's articles

Around the same time the McClure's articles were being written, another set of articles were being written by Sibyl Wilbur. Wilbur was an experienced, fairly well-known journalist with strong feminist tendencies who had interviewed Eddy in 1905. She had the financial support of the church to write a biography of Eddy which it hoped would counter the McClure's narrative, and which appeared in Human Life magazine only a month behind Milmine and Cather's work. Like Milmine, Wilbur spent months traveling through New England, and she countered the McClure's articles with her own documents and evidence, and re-interviewed all of Milmine's primary witnesses. Gillian Gill found that Wilbur clarified her sources more carefully than Milmine did. Wilbur's articles were published in book form as The Life of Mary Baker Eddy through the Concord Publishing Company in 1908; at first against the wishes of Eddy, who did not want anyone writing a biography about her, but then consented and even publicly thanked Wilbur for her work.

According to Gill, Wilbur's biography "received little positive attention at the time." Since it was very much a reaction to Milmine, Wilbur painted an extremely positive picture of Eddy which was the opposite of the McClure's narrative; and as a result her work was quickly dismissed by many for its "adulatory style". Stefan Zweig described the two biographies as "rose colored" and "black" in their contrasting images of Eddy. Both series became even more extreme as books, and Gill recommended that scholars read the original article form.

Like Milmine's The Life of Mary Baker G. Eddy, Sibyl Wilbur's The Life of Mary Baker Eddy is once again in print, this time through the Christian Science Publishing Society, and the original Human Life articles are in print through Longyear Museum.

=== Further reception and influence ===
The Life of Mary Baker G. Eddy became an important primary source for many biographies of Eddy. It influenced Lyman Pierson Powell's Christian Science: The Faith and its Founder (1907); Edwin Franden Dakin's Mrs. Eddy: The Biography of a Virginal Mind (1929); Ernest Sutherland Bates and John V. Dittemore's Mary Baker Eddy: The Truth and the Tradition (1932); and Martin Gardner's The Healing Revelations of Mary Baker Eddy (1993). Robert Peel, a life-long Christian Scientist and member of the church's Committee on Publication, also used it extensively as a source in his own three-part biography of Eddy (1966–1977). Biographer Gillian Gill, who examined many of the claims made by Milmine and Cather, wrote in her own book Mary Baker Eddy (1998):

"There is no doubt that the Milmine biography is one of the most important sources of information on Mrs. Eddy. All the interviewing and dredging up of legal papers and newspaper files, all the collection of primary documents done by Peabody, Milmine, and the McClure's team of reporters not only amassed an invaluable data bank, it also stimulated the Church of Christ, Scientist to do its own research and its own collecting. The Milmine biography is a work of considerable style and great intellectual passion, it has a message and a mission, and, perhaps for that reason, it is still very readable. I have used it extensively in this book. Yet as I hope I have shown just as extensively, the Milmine book is as much a work of polemic as a piece of reporting. When it vows, as it were, hand on heart, to speak the truth, the whole truth, and nothing but the truth, when it claims not rhetoric but reportage, not passion but objectivity, it lies and compromises the very truth of the standards it claims to espouse."

The book became an instant hit with critics of the church. A New York Times reviewer wrote in February 1910 that the book "ranks among the really great biographies—or would were its subject of more intrinsic importance" and that "were Christian Scientists open to argument or amenable to reason the wretched cult would not have survived its publication for a single month. It is unanswerable and conclusive, and nobody who has not read it can be considered well-informed as to the history or nature of Eddyism." Also in February 1910, a reviewer in The Nation compared the book to Ida Tarbell's The History of the Standard Oil Company (1904), which similarly began as a series in McClure's and hastened the demise of the company: "Miss Milmine, like Miss Tarbell, is plainly not in sympathy with the persons or the movement she describes. But the indictment, if we choose to call it that, is framed dispassionately. The damaging evidence is elaborately built up and skilfully arranged, but the reader is left largely to form his own conclusions." Arguing that the result is "an historical record of high value and of fascinating interest", the reviewer concluded that the book "demolishes Mrs. Eddy without necessarily demolishing Christian Science". Reviewing the book in the American Historical Review in July 1910, Woodbridge Riley, author of The Faith, the Falsity and the Failure of Christian Science (1925), wrote that the book "offers a strangely interesting human document. Mrs. Eddy is more than a personality, she is a type. Given the free field of a democracy she illustrates the possibilities of a shrewd combination of religion, mental medicine, and money."

A contemporary journalist, B. O. Flower, wrote that Christian Scientists were victims of a "persistent campaign of falsehood, slander and calumny." and later wrote his own book on the subject defending Eddy and the church. German Lutheran church historian Karl Holl wrote of Milmine's articles in Die Szientismus that: "Despite the verification adduced, most of the statements (in it) are readily recognizable as slander." In 2017, L. Ashley Squires wrote: "Christian Science remains poorly understood by the broader scholarly community and the public as a whole. One need only look to the frustratingly enduring usage of the 1907 McClure's biography as an authoritative source ... for evidence of scholarly ignorance."

== Editions ==
=== Early copyright history ===
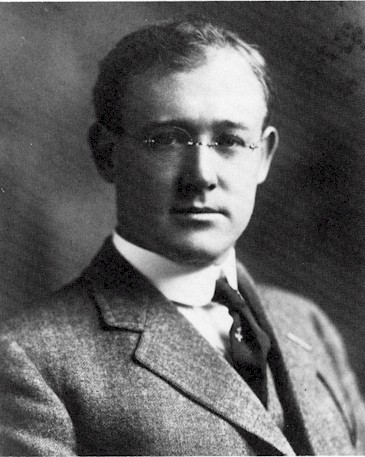
Journalist William Henry Irwin, McClure's managing editor at the time

There were rumors (which seem to have originated with Frederick Peabody) that the church purchased the manuscript and copyright as soon as the book appeared, and that the plates had been destroyed. In reality, when S. S. McClure was forced to leave the magazine in 1911 after being bought out by the board, the new owner let go of the material and drafts. Mary Beecher Longyear, a collector and founder of Longyear Museum, bought the plates in 1916, and the church bought much of the material, including a number of early drafts, from a New York manuscript dealer in 1920. It currently has the material available at the Mary Baker Eddy Library. The copyright was owned by Milmine and not the publisher; and in 1937, Milmine, then known as Georgine Milmine Adams, renewed the copyright of the biography and kept it for the rest of her life, until it entered public domain.

More rumors started that Christian Scientists were supposedly buying and destroying copies of the book, and removing them from libraries. Elizabeth Shepley Sergeant wrote in 1953 that the book "disappeared almost immediately from circulation—the Christian Scientists are said to have bought the copies". Sergeant wrote that it became scarce even in libraries, and readers in the 1950s were likely to have to borrow it from the chief librarian and be watched while reading it. However, these rumors, which again seemed to originate with Frederick Peabody, may not be true. According to Keith McNeil there is no independent record that the book actually sold out and, besides Peabody's claim, "the evidence of any systematic boycott is actually quite limited."

=== Baker Book House edition ===
The book's copyright expired 28 years after publication. (Note: The Copyright Act of 1909 extended copyright from 14 to 28 years; see "An Act to Amend and Consolidate the Acts Respecting Copyright", 1 July 1909, here for background information.) Baker Book House, a Christian publishing house, republished it in 1971 "in the interest of fairness and objectivity", according to its back cover. The introduction by Stewart Hudson explored Cather's involvement in the authorship and the influence of Eddy on several of Cather's characters, particularly Enid Royce and her mother in One of Ours.

=== University of Nebraska Press edition ===
Caroline Fraser, the most famous modern critic of the church, accused the church of trying to stop the University of Nebraska Press from republishing the book in 1993. The press was interested in publishing it, under its Bison Books imprint with a new introduction by David Stouck, because they saw the articles and book as Cather's first extended work and therefore important in her development as a writer. They obtained a copy of the original 1909 edition, by then hard to come by, from the Leon S. McGoogan Library of Medicine at the University of Nebraska Medical Center in Omaha. According to Fraser, the head of the church's public-relations office, the Committee on Publication, called the press and told them the reprint might damage the church's and Eddy's reputation. According to her, the press representative told her that the church representative "felt it was his responsibility to try to bully us into stopping publication or into saying that the book was worthless".

According to Gillian Gill the University of Nebraska Press editors were not interested in the "accuracy or inaccuracy of the biography", but only were interested in it as a "literary exercise, and early development of some of Cather's themes and characters." Stouck made clear his view in the book's preface that Willa Cather was "indisputably the principal author". He also added a statement to the book:

Since the Bison re-issue of The Life of Mary Baker G. Eddy and the History of Christian Science went to press new materials have come to light which suggest that Ms. Eddy's enemies may have played a significant role in organizing the materials for the "Milmine" biography. New information about Georgine Milmine, moreover, suggests that she would have welcomed biased opinion for its sensational and commercial value. The exact nature of Willa Cather's part in the compiling and writing of the biography remains, accordingly, a matter for further scholarly investigation.

The "enemies" Stouck refers to are likely Josephine C. Woodbury and Frederick W. Peabody, who did in fact play a significant role in supplying Milmine with much of her material. Woodbury, a former student of Eddy's, had hired Peabody as a lawyer in 1899 and sued Eddy for slander and defamation, but the case was dismissed in 1901. Peabody in particular became a notable critic of Eddy, and besides his involvement in the McClure's articles and book, wrote a significant amount attacking Eddy under his own name, including The Faith, the Falsity and the Failure of Christian Science with Woodbridge Riley; and was also involved in the "Next Friends" lawsuit against Eddy which was initiated in March 1907, after the McClure's serialization had begun.

== Sources ==
=== Works cited ===
- Bates, Ernest Sutherland and Dittemore, John V. Mary Baker Eddy: The Truth and the Tradition, New York: A. A. Knopf, 1932.
- Bohlke, L. Brent. "Willa Cather and The Life of Mary Baker G. Eddy", American Literature, 54(2), May 1982, 288–294. JSTOR 2926137
- Bohlke, L. Brent; Hoover, Sharon. Willa Cather Remembered, Lincoln: University of Nebraska Press, 2001.
- Brisbane, Arthur. What Mrs. Eddy Said to Arthur Brisbane: The Celebrated Interview of the Eminent Journalist With the Discoverer and Founder of Christian Science, New York: M. E. Paige, 1930.
- Canham, Erwin. Commitment to freedom; the story of the Christian Science Monitor, Boston, Houghton Mifflin, 1958.
- Cather, Willa. Letter to Edward H. Anderson, November 24, 1922, Manuscripts and Archives Division, New York Public Library. Reproduced in Andrew Jewell and Janis Stout (eds.), The Selected Letters of Willa Cather, New York: Vintage Books, 2014, 330–331. Also see "Letter 0649", "All Known Letters", Willa Cather Archive, University of Nebraska–Lincoln, 13.
- Cather, Willa and Milmine, Georgine. The Life of Mary Baker G. Eddy and the History of Christian Science, Lincoln: Bison Books, University of Nebraska Press, 1993.
- Classe, Olive. "Boston: The First Church of Christ, Scientist", in Trudy Ring, Noelle Watson, Paul Schellinger (eds.), The Americas: International Dictionary of Historic Places, New York: Routledge, 2013.
- Christian Science Publishing Society. Christian Science : a sourcebook of contemporary materials, CSPS, 1990.
- Cunningham, Raymond J. "The Impact of Christian Science on the American Churches, 1880–1910", The American Historical Review, 72(3), April 1967 (885–905), 892. JSTOR 1846660
- Dakin, Edwin Franden. Mrs. Eddy, the biography of a virginal mind , C. Scribner's sons, 1929.
- Eddy, Mary Baker. Retrospection and Introspection, Boston: The First Church of Christ Scientist, 1920 [1891].
- Eddy, Mary Baker. Rudimental Divine Science, Boston: The First Church of Christ Scientist, 1909 [?].
- Eddy, Mary Baker. Manual of The Mother Church, Boston: The First Church of Christ, Scientist, 89th edition, 1908 [1895].
- Eddy, Mary Baker. "Reply to McClure's Magazine", Christian Science Sentinel, January 12, 1907. Also in The First Church of Christ, Scientist, and Miscellany, 1913, Chapter XVII., 308–316.
- "Editorial announcement", McClure's, December 1906.
- Flower, B. O. Christian Science as a Religious Belief and a Therapeutic Agent, Twentieth CenturyCompany, 1909.
- Fraser, Caroline. God's Perfect Child: Living and Dying in the Christian Science Church, New York: Metropolitan Books, 1999.
- Gardner, Martin. The Healing Revelations of Mary Baker Eddy, Amherst, Prometheus Books, 1993.
- Gill, Gillian. Mary Baker Eddy, Boston: Da Capo Press, 1998.
- Gill, Gillian; reply by Caroline Fraser. "Mrs. Eddy's Voices", The New York Review of Books, June 29, 2000.
- Gorton, Stephanie. Citizen Reporters: S.S. McClure, Ida Tarbell, and the Magazine That That Rewrote America, Ecco/HarperCollins, 2020.
- Gottschalk, Stephen. The Emergence of Christian Science in American Religious Life, University of California Press, 1973.
- Gottschalk, Stephen. Rolling Away the Stone: Mary Baker Eddy's Challenge to Materialism, Indiana University Press, 2005.
- Gunnison, Duane S. The life of Mary Baker Eddy, Boston University, Thesis, 1961. (PDF)
- Howard, Stephen. "Human Life articles by Sibyl Wilbur (1906-1907)", Longyear Museum, March 2, 2020.
- Ivey, Paul Eli. Prayers in Stone: Christian Science Architecture in the United States, 1894–1930, Chicago: University of Illinois Press, 1999.
- Jewell, Andrew; Stout, Janis (eds.). The Selected Letters of Willa Cather, New York: Vintage Books, 2014 [2013].
- Johnsen, Thomas C. “Historical Consensus and Christian Science: The Career of a Manuscript Controversy.” The New England Quarterly, vol. 53, no. 1, 1980, pp. 3–22. JSTOR.
- Kennedy, Joseph S. "Columnist's words influence politics", Philadelphia Inquirer, 2 May 2004.
- Knee, Stuart E. Christian Science in the age of Mary Baker Eddy, Westport, Conn.: Greenwood Press, 1994.
- Kurland, Philip B. Religion and the law of church and state and the Supreme Court, Chicago: Aldine Pub. Co, 1962.
- Los Angeles Times. "Willa Cather", "Gossip of the Book World", March 3, 1935, 36.
- Lyon, Peter. Success Story: The Life and Times of S. S. McClure, New York: Charles Scribner's Sons, 1963.
- Mary Baker Eddy Library, Christian Science church. "Georgine Milmine Collection".
- McNeil, Keith. A Story Untold: A History of the Quimby-Eddy Debate. v1. Carmel, IN: Hawthorne Publishing, 2020.
- Milmine, Georgine. "Mary Baker G. Eddy: The Story of Her Life and the History of Christian Science", McClure's, January 1907 – June 1908.
- Milmine, Georgine. "Mrs. Eddy and Her First Disciples", "Mary Baker G. Eddy: The Story of Her Life and the History of Christian Science", McClure's, installment V, May 1907.
- Milmine, Georgine. "Literary Activities", "Mary Baker G. Eddy: The Story of Her Life and the History of Christian Science", McClure's, installment IX, October 1907.
- Milmine, Georgine. The Life of Mary Baker G. Eddy and the History of Christian Science. Grand Rapids: Baker Book House, 1971. edition notice.
- Nenneman, Richard A. Persistent pilgrim : the life of Mary Baker Eddy, Etna, NH: Nebbadoon Press, 1997.
- Peel, Robert. Mary Baker Eddy: The Years of Authority, New York: Holt, Rinehart and Winston, 1977.
- Perrotta, Tom. "Entirely Personal", The New York Times, April 25, 2013.
- Porter, David H. On the Divide: The Many Lives of Willa Cather. University of Nebraska Press, 2010 [2008].
- Riley, I. Woodbridge. "Milmine: Life of Mary Baker G. Eddy", American Historical Review, July 1910.
- Regier, Cornelius C. The Era of the Muckrakers, Gloucester, MA: P. Smith, 1957.
- Sergeant, Elizabeth Shepley. Willa Cather: A Memoir, Philadelphia and New York: J. B. Lippincott Company, 1953.
- Squires, L. Ashley. “The Standard Oil Treatment: Willa Cather, The Life of Mary Baker G. Eddy, and Early Twentieth Century Collaborative Authorship.” Studies in the Novel 45.3 (2013): 328–348. Web.
- Squires, L. Ashley. Healing the Nation: Literature, Progress, and Christian Science. Indiana University Press, 2017.
- Stark, Rodney. "The Rise and Fall of Christian Science", Journal of Contemporary Religion, 13(2), 1998, 189–214.
- Stouck, David. "Introduction", in Willa Cather and Georgine Milmine, The Life of Mary Baker G. Eddy and the History of Christian Science, Lincoln: University of Nebraska Press, 1993.
- Stouck, David. "Afterword", in Willa Cather and Georgine Milmine, The Life of Mary Baker G. Eddy and the History of Christian Science, Lincoln: University of Nebraska Press, 1993.
- Stout, Janis P. A Calendar of the Letters of Willa Cather, Lincoln: University of Nebraska Press, 2002.
- Streissguth, Tom. Writer of the Plains: A Story about Willa Cather, Millbrook Press, 2011.
- The Nation. "The Origins of Christian Science", February 10, 1910.
- The New York Times. "Mrs. Eddy's Life and Teachings", February 26, 1910.
- Wilson, Bryan R. "Christian Science", in Sects and Society: A Sociological Study of the Elim Tabernacle, Christian Science, and Christadelphians, Berkeley: University of California Press, 1961.
- "Women and the Law", Women, Enterprise & Society, Harvard Business School, archived 24 August 2019.
- Woollcott, Alexander. "Shouts & Murmurs: Take off those Whiskers", The New Yorker, February 4, 1933, 34.
- Zweig, Stefan. Mental healers: Franz Anton Mesmer, Mary Baker Eddy, Sigmund Freud. New York: F. Ungar Pub. Co, 1962.

=== Publication history ===
- "Editorial announcement", McClure's, December 1906.
- Georgine Milmine, "Mary Baker G. Eddy: The Story of Her Life and the History of Christian Science", McClure's, January 1907 – June 1908 (14 installments).
- Georgine Milmine, The Life of Mary Baker G. Eddy and the History of Christian Science, New York: Doubleday, Page & Company, 1909 (archive.org).
- Georgine Milmine, The Life of Mary Baker G. Eddy and the History of Christian Science, Grand Rapids: Baker Book House, 1971, with an introduction by Stewart Hudson.
- Willa Cather and Georgine Milmine, The Life of Mary Baker G. Eddy and the History of Christian Science, Lincoln: Bison Books, University of Nebraska Press, 1993, with an introduction and afterword by David Stouck. ISBN 0-8032-6349-X
