= Mark Sullivan (journalist) =

American journalist and syndicated political columnist

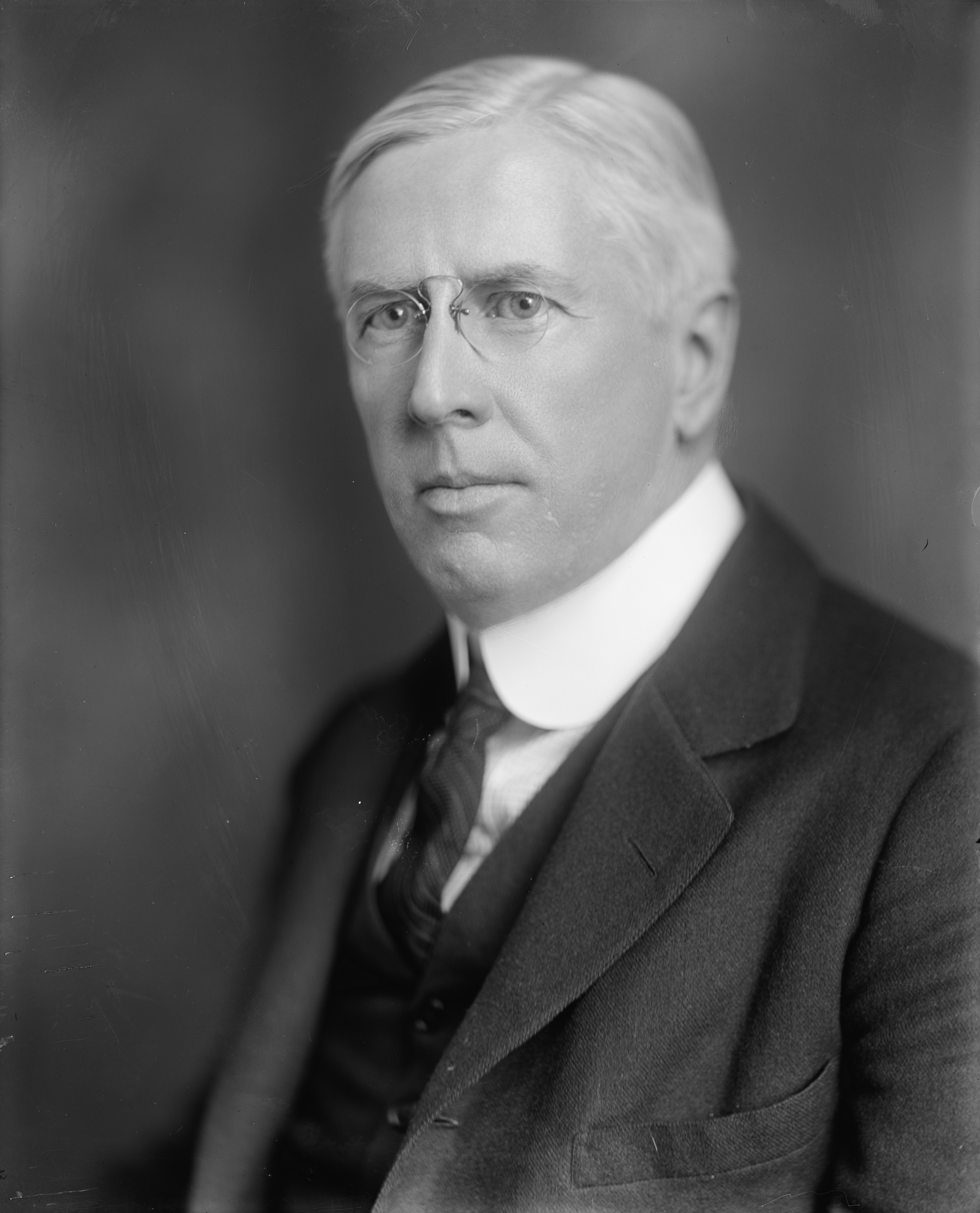
- Sullivan in c. 1920
- Born: September 10, 1874; Near Avondale, Chester County, Pennsylvania
- Died: August 13, 1952 (aged 77); Chester County Hospital; West Chester, Pennsylvania
- Education: A.B., Harvard University, 1900; LL.B, Harvard University, 1903
- Occupation: Journalist
- Years active: 1892–1952
- Era: Progressive Era
- Employer(s): New York Herald-Tribune, among others
- Known for: Political commentary
- Notable work: Our Times: The United States, 1900–1925 (six volumes, 1926–1935)
- Spouse(s): Marie Sullivan, née Buchanan
- Children: 3
- Parent(s): Julia Gleason Sullivan and Cornelius Sullivan

Mark Sullivan (September 10, 1874 – August 13, 1952) was an American journalist and syndicated political columnist. Author of the six-volume, 3,740-page Our Times: The United States, 1900–1925 (1926–1935), he was described as a "giant of American journalism" and the "Jeremiah of the United States Press".

== Early life and education ==
Sullivan was born the last of 10 children, including seven boys, to Julia Gleason Sullivan and Cornelius Sullivan, who had moved to the United States from Ireland and bought a farm in London Grove Township, near Avondale in southern Chester County, Pennsylvania. His father was also a rural mail carrier. After attending West Chester Normal School from the age of 14, Sullivan went to work for the Morning Republican in West Chester in 1892 as a reporter, then saved $300 to become co-owner, with John Miller, of the Phoenixville Republican, which Sullivan edited.

In 1896 he went to Harvard University, obtaining an A.B. in 1900 and a law degree three years later; when he graduated, he sold his shares in the Phoenixville Republican. While at Harvard, he wrote for the Boston Evening Transcript.

== Career ==
=== Early career ===
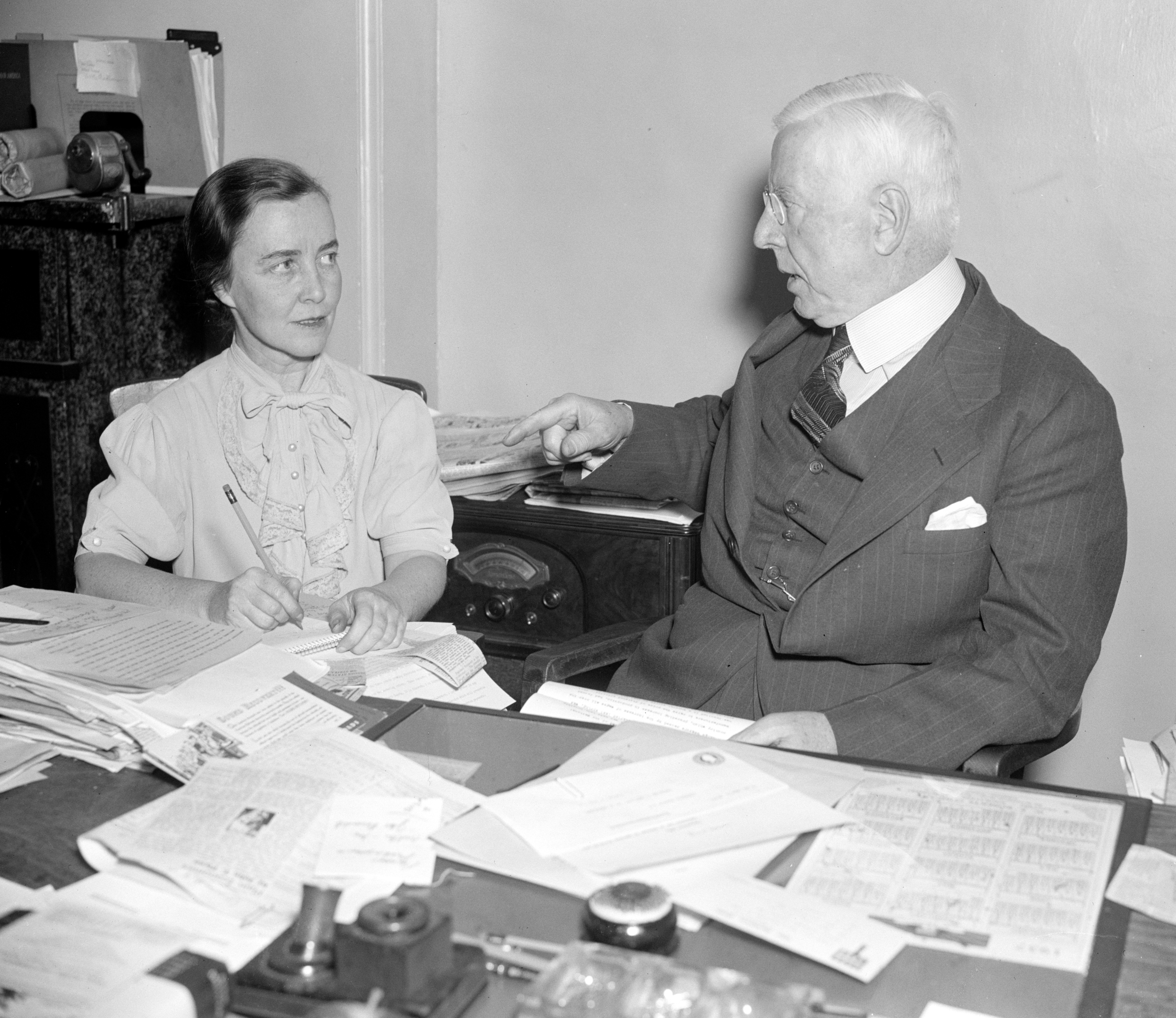
Sullivan in 1937 with Mabel Shea, his secretary of 17 years

In October 1901, the Atlantic Monthly published an article by Sullivan, "The Ills of Pennsylvania", on corruption among local and state officials who were reportedly accepting bribes. A focal point was Matthew Quay, the local Republican senator. Sullivan alleged that Pennsylvania was "politically the most corrupt state in the union" and Philadelphia "the most evil large city in America". The article triggered a widespread debate about honesty in politics and the role of the press.

Sullivan practiced law in New York City for a short time, a career which he later described "as brief as it was briefless", then returned to journalism. After writing for the Ladies Home Journal about misleading advertising for patent medicines, he was hired in 1905 by McClure's as a staff writer. He stayed on for less than a year, covering three assignments. The first was a series of 14 investigative articles by Georgine Milmine on Mary Baker Eddy, later published in a book. In his autobiography, The Education of an American, Sullivan described how he spent time fact-checking in New Hampshire. Afterwards he went to Montana to check a manuscript by Christopher P. Connolly on feuding copper miners there, and finally to Louisville, Kentucky to assist in Lincoln Steffens' work on municipal corruption, The Shame of the Cities. He noted that many citizens of the various cities covered by Steffens work took a "morbid pleasure in being included", sending letters with briefs or fragmentary manuscripts to McClure's asking the magazine to "Expose us next!"

After McClure's, Sullivan moved to Collier's Weekly, where he became an associate editor, then editor in 1912. He also wrote a regular column, "Comment on Congress", from 1908 until 1919. When Sullivan joined the New York Evening Post in 1919 as its Washington correspondent, the newspaper's president, Edwin F. Gay, wrote: "His ability, his vision, his knowledge of human reactions and twenty years of Political study are coupled with unquestionable sincerity, plus 100 percent of rugged Americanism." While living in Washington, on Wyoming Avenue, he and his wife became friends with Herbert Hoover, who lived nearby on S Street; the close relationship continued when Hoover became president in 1929, to the point where Sullivan was viewed as one of Hoover's spokespersons. Describing feelings in the Midwest, Sullivan wrote in 1928: "I don't like Prohibition, but I'm going to vote for Hoover because I'd rather eat than drink."

=== New York Herald-Tribune ===
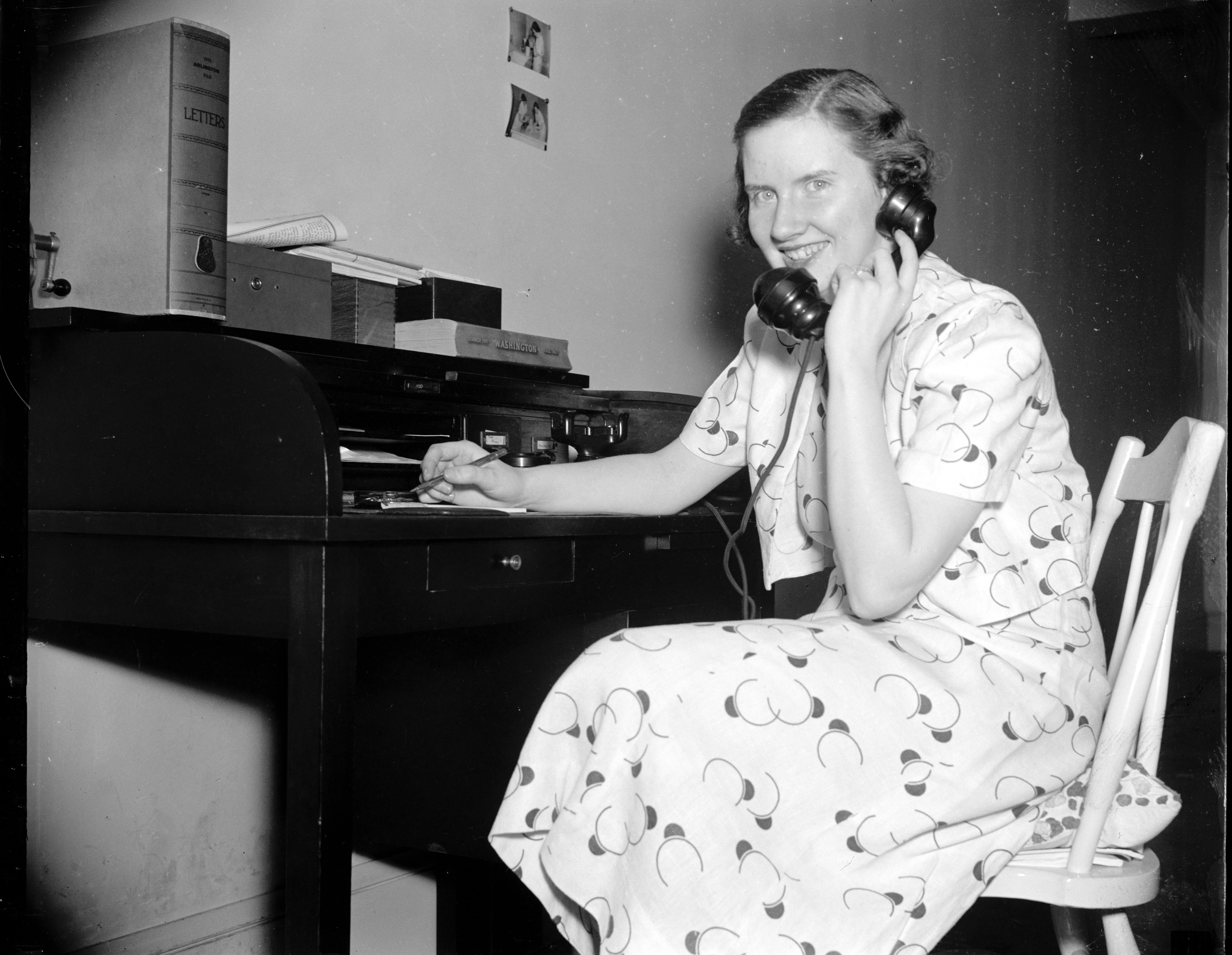
Sullivan's daughter, Narcissa Sullivan (then Narcissa McGee), in 1937

In the early 1920s Sullivan joined the New York Herald (later named the New York Herald-Tribune) and became a syndicated political columnist. Between 1924 and 1952 he wrote nearly 6,000 columns, usually "Mark Sullivan Says", for the Herald-Tribune and others. During the same period, he wrote his six-volume Our Times: The United States, 1900–1925 (1926–1935). Dan Rather, who edited the material to produce one volume, wrote in 1996 that "no series of nonfiction books, all on the same general subject by the same author over such a compact space of writing time, ever captured the country so completely, sold so well, was so widely read and acclaimed, and had such a lasting, growing reputation for excellence".

Sullivan said in 1935 that he was a liberal ("Teddy Roosevelt was my only political god") and that consistent with liberalism he sought to "take power away from the state". Michael Hiltzik described him in 2011 as a progressive who "moved steadily rightward". By 1935 his view of Franklin D. Roosevelt's New Deal was "frankly apocalyptic", in Hiltzik's view. In 1937, after the Social Security Act was signed into law, he made his secretary of 17 years, Mabel Shea, famous by asking why she should be forced to pay 35 cents social security out of her weekly paycheck of $35 (equivalent to $1209.37 in 2025). This led Time magazine to publish that Sullivan had an annual income of $23,417 (over $408,000 in 2018). During a press briefing, Roosevelt said Sullivan was arguing that Shea had the "absolute freedom, as an American citizen, to starve to death when she got to be sixty-five if she wanted to". He suggested that Sullivan raise her salary.

== Personal life ==
Sullivan and his wife, Marie McMechan Buchanan Sullivan, married in 1907. She died in 1940. The couple had two daughters, Narcissa and Sydney, and a son, Mark Jr.

== Death ==
Sullivan became the owner of his parents' farm in London Grove and continued to regard it as his home. When he died, aged 77, of a heart attack in 1952, he was taken to hospital from the same bedroom in which he had been born. His estate was valued at $65,000 (over $600,000 in 2018), most of which went to his children, including 200 acres of farmland. He left Mabel Shea $10,000.

== Selected works ==
- Our Times: The United States, 1900–1925: The Turn of the Century, 1900–1904. New York: Charles Scribner's Sons, 1926.
- Our Times: The United States, 1900–1925: America Finding Herself. New York: Charles Scribner's Sons, 1927.
- Our Times: The United States, 1900–1925: Pre-War America. New York: Charles Scribner's Sons, 1930.
- Our Times: The United States, 1900–1925: The War Begins, 1909–1914. New York: Charles Scribner's Sons, 1932.
- Our Times: The United States, 1900–1925: Over Here, 1914–1918. New York: Charles Scribner's Sons, 1933.
- Our Times: The United States, 1900–1925: The Twenties. New York: Charles Scribner's Sons, 1935. online
- The Education of an American. New York: Doubleday, Doran & Co., 1938 (autobiography).

== See also ==
- Muckraker
- Progressive Era
