= Georgine Milmine =

Canadian-American journalist

Georgine Milmine Welles Adams
- Born: Georgine Milmine; 1871 or 1874; Ontario, Canada
- Died: 27 August 1950 (aged 78–79 or 75–76)
- Occupation: Writer
- Notable work: The Life of Mary Baker G. Eddy and the History of Christian Science
- Spouses: Benjamin Welles (m. 1905; died 1911) Arthur A. Adams (m. 1914)

Georgine Milmine Welles Adams (c. 1871 – 27 August 1950), best known as Georgine Milmine, was a Canadian-American journalist most known for writing about Mary Baker Eddy, the founder of Christian Science. Milmine, along with Willa Cather and others, worked on 14 investigative articles about Eddy that were published by McClure's in 1907–1908. One of the only major investigative works on Eddy to be published in her lifetime, besides Sibyl Wilbur's Human Life articles, the articles were instigated by Milmine: S. S. McClure purchased her freelance research before assigning a group of reporters to verify, expand and write it up.

== Biography ==
=== Early life ===
Georgine Milmine was born in Ontario, Canada, but later moved to live in Upstate New York She pursued a career in journalism and wrote for the St. Louis Star, the Buffalo Courier, and apparently tried to start her own periodical, named The Chiel, although its fate is unknown. She went to work as a proofreader for The Syracuse Herald around 1894.

At the Herald she met Benjamin Welles, who was her managing editor. Welles was forced to resign because of his drinking habit but was later reinstated. Although married, there was gossip of an affair between Welles and Milmine, and she was then asked to resign, so she went to work for some New York papers instead. In 1905, Welles got a divorce from is wife and married Milmine, creating somewhat of a local scandal. They were married on 22 August 1905, and made their home in Auburn, New York, where Milmine went to work for The Auburn Citizen.

=== McClure's articles ===
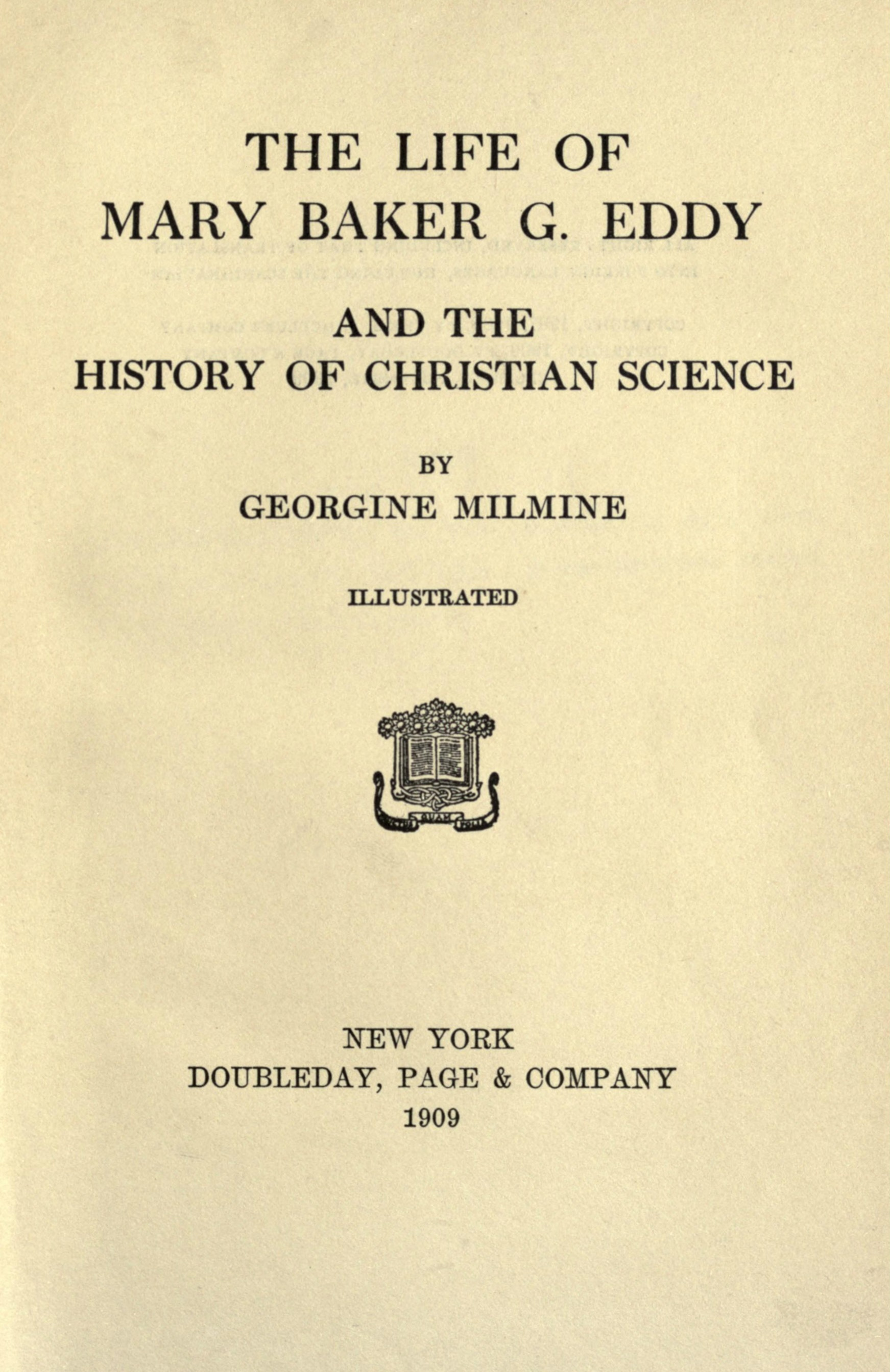
First edition of The Life of Mary Baker G. Eddy and the History of Christian Science (1909)

Before McClure's published her work, Milmine had been collecting material about Eddy for roughly three years, or since about 1903. Her research included court records, newspaper articles from the 1880s, and a first edition of Science and Health, which were hard to obtain.

Lacking the resources to verify and write up the material, she sold it to S. S. McClure, who assigned several writers to check and expand it, including Willa Cather, Burton J. Hendrick, and William Henry Irwin. It was published in 14 installments between January 1907 and June 1908, and in 1909 as a book under Milmine's byline.

When McClure's itself was sold, the new owner apparently threw away the research files, including the first edition of Science and Health. At least some of Milmine's research survived; it was purchased in June 1920 by The First Church of Christ, Scientist, from a New York Manuscript dealer. The church's Mary Baker Eddy Library has made available three early drafts of the work.

=== Later life ===
After her first husband's death in January 1912, Milmine remarried, this time to a pharmacist in Auburn, Arthur A. Adams, on 14 August 1914. She and her second husband moved to Falmouth, Massachusetts, in 1937. That year, by then known as Georgine Milmine Adams, she renewed the copyright of the Eddy biography. She died in August 1950, three weeks before her husband. They were buried in Fort Hill Cemetery, Auburn.

== Selected works ==
- Milmine, Georgine, Cather, Willa, et al. (January 1907 – June 1908). "Mary Baker G. Eddy: The Story of Her Life and the History of Christian Science", McClure's (14 installments).
- Milmine, Georgine (1909). The Life of Mary Baker G. Eddy and the History of Christian Science. New York: Doubleday, Page & Company. OCLC 752797135.
  - Milmine, Georgine (1971). The Life of Mary Baker G. Eddy and the History of Christian Science. Grand Rapids, Michigan: Baker Book House. OCLC 150493. Introduction by Stewart Hudson.
