= Edwin Franden Dakin =

American advertising executive and author

- Born: 1898; Hannibal, Missouri
- Died: March 26, 1976 (aged 77–78); Covington, Louisiana
- Occupations: Advertising executive, author

Edwin Franden Dakin (1898–1976) was an American advertising executive and author who wrote a critical biography of Mary Baker Eddy.

== Biography ==
Dakin was associate editor of the weekly magazine Commerce and Finance (1922–1926). He also edited the magazine Plane Talk.

He is best known for his book Mrs. Eddy: The Biography of a Virginal Mind, a critical biography of Mary Baker Eddy. It was the first biography to document Eddy's use of morphine. It received positive reviews in academic journals as well as other publications at the time. The Dictionary of American Biography described it as the "most impartial and scholarly biography" of Eddy and its editor Ernest Sutherland Bates praised the book for its judicious examination of sources. In 1929, H. L. Mencken commented that Dakin "has been at pains to unearth the precise facts and he sets them forth carefully and pleasantly. The Christian Science press-agents, of course, will damn him as a slanderer, but that fact is unimportant. He has made a valuable contribution to American history."

More recently, literary critic Daniel Burt wrote in 2001 that the book is a detailed biography and Dakin achieved a "detailed account that achieves an objectivity rare in books about Eddy. Although now superseded by subsequent studies".

When Dakin's biography of Mary Baker Eddy was published in 1929, Christian Science officials from the Mother Church tried to censor and suppress the book. Christian Scientists complained that the biography was biased and negative towards Eddy. The Mother Church threatened a number of bookstores that were selling it with foreclosure of mortgages. John Hall Wheelock noted that an officer from the First Church of Christ Scientist threatened its publisher Charles Scribner's Sons with "malicious animal magnetism". Christian Scientists threatened to boycott stores that displayed the book for sale. They were unsuccessful and Dakin's biography was republished by Scribner's in 1930. It was issued with a pamphlet that documented the attempted suppression, The Blight that Failed, which "turned the book into a best seller".

In 1947, Dakin along with Edward R. Dewey, published Cycles: The Science of Prediction, a book which argued that the United States economy was driven by four cycles of different length. Robert Gale Woolbert wrote that they "adduce interesting second-hand statistics to the effect that cyclical tendencies have been observed in industrial, biological and solar phenomena." Milton Friedman dismissed their theory as pseudoscience saying:

[Cycles] is not a scientific book: the evidence underlying the stated conclusions is not presented in full; data graphed are not identified so that someone else could reproduce them; the techniques employed are nowhere described in detail. [...] Its closest analogue is the modern high-power advertisement—here of book length and designed to sell an esoteric and supposedly scientific product. Like most modern advertising, the book seeks to sell its product by making exaggerated claims for it [...], showing it in association with other valued objects which really don't have anything to do with it [...], keeping discreetly silent about its defeats or mentioning them in only the vaguest form [...], and citing authorities who think highly of the product.

== Publications ==
- Mrs. Eddy: The Biography of a Virginal Mind (1929) ISBN 978-1-4179-0849-3
- Cycles: The Science of Prediction (1947; with Edward R. Dewey)
