= Edward R. Dewey =

American economist

Edward R. Dewey

Edward Russel Dewey (1895–1978) was an economist who studied cycles in economics and other fields.

== Dewey's cycles work ==
Dewey first became interested in cycles while Chief Economic Analyst of the Department of Commerce in 1930 or 1931 because President Hoover wanted to know the cause of the Great Depression. Dewey reported that each economist to whom he spoke gave him a different answer and he lost faith in the current economic methods. He received and took advice to study how business behaviour occurred rather than why. Therefore, his views are generally regarded as inconsistent with mainstream economics.

Dewey devoted his life to the study of cycles, claiming that "everything that has been studied has been found to have cycles present." He carried out extensive studies of cyclicity in economics, geology, biology, sociology, and other disciplines. In 1940, Edward R. Dewey learned of a 1931 Canadian conference on biological cycles held at Matamek. Under the guidance of Dewey and the conference leader, Copley Amory, the conference's Permanent Committee was reorganized into the Foundation for the Study of Cycles in 1941, and its scope was enlarged to encompass all disciplines. The foundation was set up with a board that included distinguished scientists and industrialists to act as a central clearing house of cycles studies from diverse areas.

The Foundation made studies of natural and social sciences as well as business and economics, and new methods were devised for isolating significant cycles present in time series. A magazine called Cycles was published from June 1950, and the foundation also published a four-volume collection of reports on cycles including some of Dewey's selected writings on cycles named "Cycles Classic Library Collection". Together with author Og Mandino, Dewey published a book entitled Cycles: The Mysterious Forces That Trigger Events.

As a result of his research, Dewey asserted that seemingly unrelated time series often had similar cycles periods present and that when they did the phase of these cycles was mostly very similar (cycle synchrony). He also said that there were many cycles with periods that were related by powers or products of 2 and 3. This is illustrated in the table below. To construct this table starting from the period 17.75 years, multiply by three as you proceed along diagonals from lower left to upper right, and multiply by two as you proceed along diagonals from lower right to upper left. Dewey reported that the underlined numbers are commonly occurring periods (in years):

142.0  213.9  319.5  479.3
-----
    71.0  106.5  159.8
          -----
        35.5   53.3
        ----   ----
           17.75
           -----
         5.92   8.88
         ----   ----
    1.97    2.96   4.44
    ----    ----   ----
  0.66   0.99   1.48   2.22
  ----   ----   ----
0.22  0.33  0.49   0.74  1.11
      ----  ----   ----  ----

Volume IV of the Cycles Classic Library Collection contains 1380 reports of cycles period determinations by scientists, doctors, economists and cycles researchers. In these reports there is a tendency for certain periods of cycles to be reported more commonly. These common periods include the underlined periods above and some other periods such as 9.6 years, found in the 9.6 year cycle of lynx abundance and 3.39 years (40.68 months), found in the US stock market, which Dewey says is the most commonly found period. Dewey further said that:

More than 500 different phenomena in 36 different areas of knowledge have been found to fluctuate in rhythmic cycles.

== Criticism ==
=== Cycles: The Science of Prediction ===
In 1947, Dewey and Edwin Franden Dakin published their book Cycles: The Science of Prediction which argued the United States economy was driven by four cycles of different length. Robert Gale Woolbert wrote that they "adduce interesting second-hand statistics to the effect that cyclical tendencies have been observed in industrial, biological and solar phenomena." Milton Friedman dismissed their theory as pseudoscience:

[Cycles: The Science of Prediction] is not a scientific book: the evidence underlying the stated conclusions is not presented in full; data graphed are not identified so that someone else could reproduce them; the techniques employed are nowhere described in detail. [...] Its closest analogue is the modern high-power advertisement—here of book length and designed to sell an esoteric and supposedly scientific product. Like most modern advertising, the book seeks to sell its product by making exaggerated claims for it [...], showing it in association with other valued objects which really don't have anything to do with it [...], keeping discreetly silent about its defeats or mentioning them in only the vaguest form [...], and citing authorities who think highly of the product.

Joseph Schumpeter also put forward the idea that there were four economic cycles: Kitchin, Juglar, Kuznets and Kondratieff.

=== Business cycles ===
John Brookes describes Dewey's attitude to the business cycle:

I asked Dewey whether the cycles he was interested in had anything to do with the business cycle that economists were always talking about. Nothing at all, he replied. Although many of the cycles that the Foundation studies occur in economics and business affairs, what is usually called the business cycle is recurrent but not rhythmic – that is, its crests and bottoms do not necessarily occur at regular intervals and so, in the view of the Foundation, it isn't a true cycle.

Murray Rothbard critiques Schumpeter's and Dewey's approach in Man, Economy, and State:

Any such "multicyclic" approach must be set down as a mystical adoption of the fallacy of conceptual realism. There is no reality or meaning to the allegedly independent sets of "cycles." The market is one interdependent unit, and the more developed it is, the greater the interrelations among market elements. It is therefore impossible for several or numerous independent cycles to coexist as self-contained units. It is precisely the characteristic of a business cycle that it permeates all market activities.

and in America's Great Depression:

Some economists—such as Warren and Pearson or Dewey and Dakin —have believed that there are no such things as general business fluctuations—that general movements are but the results of different cycles that take place, at different specific time-lengths, in the various economic activities. To the extent that such varying cycles (such as the 20-year "building cycle" or the seventeen-year cicada cycle) may exist, however, they are irrelevant to a study of business cycles in general or to business depressions in particular. What we are trying to explain are general booms and busts in business.

== The Foundation for the Study of Cycles ==
The Foundation for the Study of Cycles (FSC) is an international non-profit research organization for the study of cycles of events. It was incorporated in the State of Connecticut by Edward R. Dewey in 1941 and is currently under the directorship of Dr. Richard Smith.

- Dewey, Edward R.; Dakin, Edwin Franden (1947). Cycles, the Science of Prediction. New York: H. Holt and Company. LCCN 47001975.
- Dewey, Edward R. (1970). Cycles; selected writings. Pittsburgh: Foundation for the Study of Cycles. 73016987.
- Dewey, Edward R. (1987). Cycles Classic Library Collection (4 volumes). Foundation for the Study of Cycles.

== See also ==
- Business cycle
- Econophysics
- Nikolai Kondratiev proposed medium and 50-year cycles in the 1920s.
- Joseph Schumpeter (claimed in the 1940s that there were a least three business cycles, one short term, one of 7–11 years and one of about 50 years.)
