= Sibyl Wilbur =

American journalist and feminist author

Sibyl Wilbur O'Brien Stone
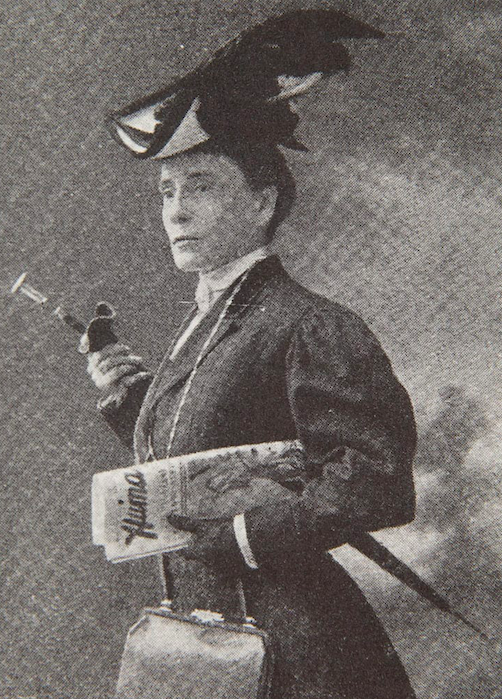
- Wilbur holding a copy of Human Life
- Born: May 27, 1871; Elmira, New York
- Died: July 21, 1946 (aged 75); San Diego, California
- Occupations: Biographer, journalist
- Notable work: The Life of Mary Baker Eddy

Sibyl Wilbur O'Brien Stone (May 27, 1871 – July 21, 1946), best known as Sibyl Wilbur, was an American journalist, suffragist, and author The Life of Mary Baker Eddy, a biography of Mary Baker Eddy, the founder of The First Church of Christ, Scientist. She was a San Diego Branch Member of the National League of American Pen Women and a member of the New England Woman's Press Association.

== Biography ==
Sibyl Wilbur was born on May 27, 1871 in Elmira, New York to Dewitt and Anna Wilbur. Wilbur's parents both died when she young, and by 14 she had moved to Nebraska and begun teaching at a prairie school. Eventually she saved enough money to go to college and start a career in journalism. For over 20 years she wrote for major metropolitan newspapers in New York, Chicago, Washington, D.C., Minneapolis, and Boston, on topics such as women's rights, labor issues, and culture. She was politically active as an organizer in the Woman Suffrage Party in New York City, and spoke publicly on the topic.

She is most known for her writings on Mary Baker Eddy, founder of The First Church of Christ, Scientist, who she met in 1905 while interviewing her for the Boston Herald. From 1906 to 1907, Wilbur wrote a series of thirteen articles about Eddy in the Boston magazine Human Life which, In 1908, became the basis her book The Life of Mary Baker Eddy. The book became the first church-authorized biography to be sold in Christian Science Reading Rooms. It was reprinted numerous times.

Although Wilbur was not a member of the church, she was friendly towards Eddy, and her articles and book were motivated in part to defend Eddy from a similar series of articles published around the same time by McClure's Magazine, which attacked Eddy and the church. Eddy later thanked Wilbur and the Concord Publishing Society for publishing the book.

The book includes content based on interviews of many people who knew Eddy before she was famous. There have been notable critics of the book over the years however, such as Christian Science critic John V. Dittemore, and Gaius Glenn Atkins, a critic of new religious movements in general, who attacked the book saying that it "touches lightly or omits altogether those passages in Mrs. Eddy's life which do not fit in with the picture which Mrs. Eddy herself and the church desire to be perpetuated." The Mary Baker Eddy Library also notes criticism of the book for being "excessively laudatory" of Eddy, but says that "it was also based on factual reporting and helped counter basic misinformation about Eddy and Christian Science that was rampant at the time."

After writing her biography of Eddy, Wilbur continued to become even more involved with the women's suffrage movement, especially in San Diego, California where she moved in 1918.

Wilbur was a San Diego Branch member of the National League of American Pen Women and a member of the New England Woman's Press Association.

== Publications ==
- The Life of Mary Baker Eddy (New York: Concord Publishing Co., 1908)
