= Mapparium =

Stained glass globe in Massachusetts, US

Coordinates: 42°20′42.75″N 71°05′10.90″W

The Mapparium is a three-story-tall globe made of stained glass that is viewed from a 30-foot-long (9.1 m) bridge through its interior. As of August 2021, it was part of the "How Do You See the World?" exhibit of the Christian Science Publishing Society in Boston, Massachusetts.

Built in 1935 and based upon Rand McNally political maps published the previous year, the Mapparium shows the political world as it was at that time, including such long-disused labels as Italian East Africa and Siam, as well as more recently defunct political entities such as the Soviet Union. In 1939, 1958, and 1966 the Church considered updating the map, but rejected it on the basis of cost and the special interest it holds as a historical artifact.

== Design and construction ==
In the 1930s, during the construction of the Christian Science Publishing Society building, the architect Chester Lindsay Churchill was inspired to design a globe to represent The Christian Science Monitor's global awareness and global reach.

Churchill was originally influenced by the famous spinning globe in the lobby of the New York Daily News Building.

The 608 stained glass panels were produced by the Rambusch Company of New York City and the Mapparium was opened to the public on June 1, 1935.

The Mapparium was closed in 1998 for a four-year cleaning and renovation. It reopened in 2002 as an exhibit of the Mary Baker Eddy Library, and now features a light-and-sound-show that illustrates how the world has changed since 1935. Computer-controlled lighting by the Color Kinetics company provides effects and highlights regions as the narration discusses them. The stained glass restoration was performed by the Boston-area firm Serpentino Stained Glass. As of August 2021 the Mapparium is no longer an exhibit of the Mary Baker Eddy Library, but is part of the Church’s ‘How Do You See the World?’ exhibit on the ground floor of the Christian Science Publishing House.

In 2004, the name Mapparium was registered as a U.S. trademark (#2861312) by the Board of Directors of The First Church of Christ, Scientist, for "Educational services, namely, providing an educational exhibition of the earth. First use: 19350531. First use in commerce: 19350531."

=== View from within ===
The Mapparium was designed to allow the countries of the world to be viewed in accurate geographical relationship to each other, hence the design of the Mapparium—a mirror-image, concave reversal of the Earth, viewed from within. This is the only configuration that places the eye at the same distance from every point on the globe.

Andrew Sinclair's comments show the success of this idea

The Mapparium is so large, and you can see so much of it at once (because it's concave instead of convex), that you can really get an idea of relative sizes and distances. For example, you can see why a plane from London to San Francisco flies over Montana, Idaho, Oregon and Nevada. You also notice just how far north the United States, Europe, and Asia are. Standing at the equator, you really have to strain your neck to see them.

=== Acoustics ===
The hard spherical surface of the globe reflects sound and produces striking acoustical effects. It forms a remarkable whispering gallery so that visitors standing at corresponding locations near opposite ends of the bridge can speak to each other and be heard as if they were standing next to each other. One visitor writes:

There are many whispering galleries around the world, such as in St Paul's Cathedral in London, or the Echo Wall in Beijing's Temple of Heaven. However, the Mapparium is different in that speaking in any direction, since it is a full sphere, will result in the same effect. Furthermore, standing in the middle of the sphere and speaking produces the unnerving effect of hearing yourself in surround sound with startling clarity.
