= Woodbridge Riley =

- Born: May 20, 1869; New York City
- Died: September 2, 1933 (aged 64); Cape May, New Jersey
- Occupations: Historian of philosophy, writer

Isaac Woodbridge Riley (May 20, 1869 – September 2, 1933) was an American academic scholar who worked in and across the areas of philosophy, religion, and psychology. His published work often combined two of these disciplines in considering the historical development of a social movement or entity (such as a church), particularly examining the influence of the founders' psychological character. Most of his career was spent as a professor of philosophy at Vassar College.

== Biography ==
Riley was born in New York City. He graduated from Yale University in 1892, and took the degrees of A.M. and Ph.D. there in 1898 and 1902 respectively. He cited the noted and decorated Philosopher, Psychologist, and Congregational minister George Trumbull Ladd (Clarke Professor of Metaphysics and Moral Philosophy at Yale University) as his first Philosophy teacher. From 1903, Riley was associate editor of the Psychological Bulletin. He was Johnston research scholar at Johns Hopkins University from 1904 to 1907, during which period he was already "for some time" a professor at the University of New Brunswick. In 1908, Riley became professor of philosophy at Vassar, and by 1920 was simultaneously a lecturer at the Sorbonne..

Riley's Ph.D. thesis at Yale was The Founder of Mormonism: A Psychological Study of Joseph Smith, published in 1902. It was positively reviewed in psychology journals. Riley suspected that Joseph Smith acquired his visions from epileptic seizures. He wrote that the "psychiatric definition of the epileptic fits the prophet to a dot." He associated Smith's dictation of the Book of Mormon with the phenomenon of automatic writing.

He is also known for his book The Faith, the Falsity and the Failure of Christian Science (1925), co-authored with physician Charles Edward Humiston and lawyer Frederick William Peabody. The book argues that Christian Science has no scientific legitimacy, it also records many cases of death which he claims were caused by its practitioners due to lack of medical treatment. Riley argued that Mary Baker Eddy plagiarized her ideas from Franz Mesmer, Phineas Quimby and the Shakers.

== Publications ==
Books

- The Founder of Mormonism (1902) [with an introduction and preface by George Trumbull Ladd]
- American Philosophy: The Early Schools (1907)
- American Thought from Puritanism to Pragmatism and Beyond (1915)
- Bismarck and His Policies (1917)
- The Faith, the Falsity and the Failure of Christian Science (1925) [with Charles Edward Humiston and Frederick William Peabody]
- From Myth to Reason: The Story of the March of Mind in the Interpretation of Nature (1926)
- Men and Morals: The Story of Ethics (1929)
- The Meaning of Mysticism (1930)

Papers

- Woodbridge, Riley. (1905). Recent Theories of Genius. The Journal of Philosophy, Psychology and Scientific Methods 2 (13): 345–352.
- Woodbridge, Riley. (1909). Transcendentalism and Pragmatism: A Comparative Study. The Journal of Philosophy, Psychology and Scientific Methods 6 (10): 263–266.
- Woodbridge, Riley. (1910). Reviewed Work: The Life of Mary Baker G. Eddy and the History of Christian Science by Georgine Milmine. The American Historical Review 15 (4): 898–900.
- Woodbridge, Riley (1918). "Early Free-Thinking Societies in America". Harvard Theological Review. 11 (3): 247–284. doi:10.1017/S0017816000011743. JSTOR 1507488. S2CID 164022291.

Reviews

- Woodbridge, Riley. (1910). The Life of Mary Baker G. Eddy and the History of Christian Science. The American Historical Review. pp. 898–899.
- Woodbridge, Riley. (1924). Man and His Ideas. The Outlook. pp. 334–338.
- Woodbridge, Riley. (1925). The Blavatskian Puzzle. The Saturday Review. pp. 822–823.
- Woodbridge, Riley. (1928). Esoteric Cults. The Saturday Review. p. 455.
- Woodbridge, Riley. (1929). Mrs. Eddy: The Biography of a Virginal Mind. The Saturday Review. pp. 103–104.
- Woodbridge, Riley. (1932). A New Life of Mrs. Eddy. The Saturday Review. pp. 192–193.
