= Elizabeth Shepley Sergeant =

American writer (1881–1965)

- Born: April 23, 1881; Winchester, Massachusetts, US
- Died: January 26, 1965 (aged 83)
- Occupations: Journalist, Writer
- Writing career
- Years active: 1910–1960

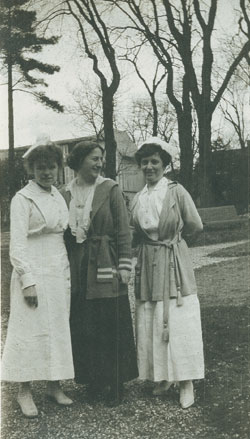
Elizabeth Shepley Sergeant (in the center) at the American Hospital of Paris, 1918

Elizabeth Shepley Sergeant (April 23, 1881 – January 26, 1965) was an American journalist and writer.

== Biography ==
Elizabeth Shepley Sergeant was born on April 23, 1881, in Winchester, Massachusetts, to Charles Spencer Sergeant, an executive with the Boston Elevated Railway, and Elizabeth Blake Shepley Sergeant. Her younger sister Katharine Sergeant Angell White was an editor for The New Yorker and wife of E. B. White, author of Charlotte's Web and writer for The New Yorker. Sergeant was also an aunt of Roger Angell, another writer for The New Yorker. She had another sister named Rosamund. She was known to friends and family as Elsie.

Sergeant was educated at Miss Winsor's School (now called The Winsor School) in Boston from 1894 to 1899 and Bryn Mawr College from 1899 to 1903.

== Career ==
In 1910, she wrote her first article, "Toilers of the Tenements," which she published in McClure's Magazine under the editorship of Willa Cather, thus beginning a lifelong friendship between the two women. In the same year (1910), she undertook extensive research on "Artificial Flower Making in Paris" for Mary van Kleeck who published a book on the "Artificial Flower Makers" for the Russell Sage Foundation. When the New Republic was founded in 1914, she became one of its original contributors. In 1916, she published her first book, French Perspectives, a result of her extensive travels to that country as the New Republic's war correspondent.

On October 19, 1918, she was severely injured when her companion picked up a hand grenade that exploded. That experience resulted in her second book, Shadow-Shapes: Journal of a Wounded Woman, 1920.

She moved to Taos, New Mexico, in 1920, following her doctor's advice. She wrote about the Pueblo Indians and New Mexico itself until the mid-1930s, publishing mostly in the New Republic and the Nation. She spent extensive time in New York City and at the Macdowell Colony. In 1927, she published a collection of profiles about prominent Americans, Fire Under the Andes. Sergeant studied with Carl Jung and Toni Woolf in Zurich from 1929 to 1931. She published her only novel, Short as any Dream, in 1929.

In the mid-1930s, John Collier, Commissioner of Indian Affairs, hired her to report on Pueblo social conditions and reactions to the Wheeler-Howard Act. Sergeant moved to Piermont in Rockland County, New York. In the 1930s and 1940s, she continued to publish magazine articles. During this period, Sergeant's sister Katharine financially supported her, though the two did not get along and were wary of each other. In 1953, she published the first of her two full-length biographies, Willa Cather: A Memoir. Despite her ill health and failing eyesight, in 1960, she published the well-reviewed Robert Frost: The Trial by Experience

== Death ==
Sergeant had planned to follow this with an autobiography, but she did not live to complete it. She was staying at the Cosmopolitan Club in New York City when she died on January 26, 1965. She was found the next day advancing to her next book in her pocket. Her wish was to be cremated and have her ashes buried in the Shepley-Sergeant plot in Winchester, Massachusetts. Katharine held a memorial service for her on April 12, 1965, at the Cosmopolitan Club, at which Bryn Mawr College President Katharine McBride introduced the speakers, including Robert Frost's daughter, Leslie Frost Ballantine, and the writer Glenway Wescott.

== Books ==
=== Nonfiction ===
- Sergeant, E. S. (1916). French Perspectives. United States: Houghton Mifflin.
- Sergeant, E. S. (2013). Shadow-Shapes: The Journal of a Wounded Woman, October 1918 – May 1919 – Primary Source Edition. United States: BiblioLife.ISBN 9781289361082
- Sergeant, E. S. (1927). Fire Under the Andes. A Group of North American Portraits, Etc. [Illustrated.].. United States: (n.p.).
- Sergeant, E. S. (1931). Mr. Justice Holmes
- Sergeant, E. S. (1953). Willa Cather: A Memoir by Elizabeth Shepley Sergeant. United States: J. B. Lippincott Co.
- Sergeant, E. S. (1965). Robert Frost: The Trial by Existence. United States: Holt.

=== Fiction ===
- Sergeant, E. S. (1929). Short as Any Dream. United Kingdom: Harper & Brothers.
