= The First Church of Christ, Scientist =

Church building in Boston, Massachusetts, US

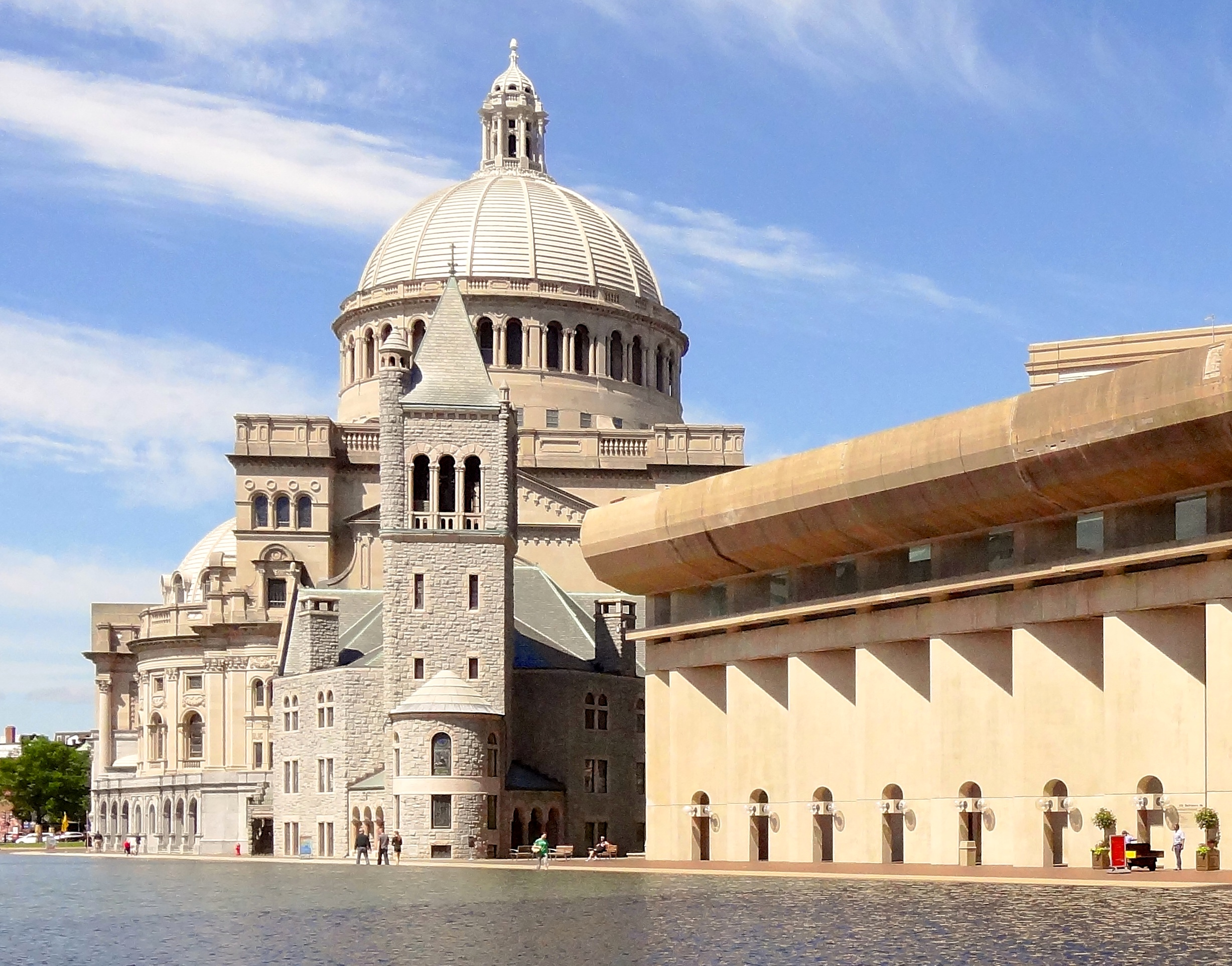
- The original Mother Church (1894) and behind it the domed Mother Church Extension (1906); on the right, the Colonnade building (1972). The reflecting pool is in the foreground.
- The First Church of Christ, Scientist
- 42.34443°N 71.084872°W
- Location: Christian Science Center; 250 Massachusetts Avenue; Boston, Massachusetts
- Denomination: Christian Science
- Website: The First Church of Christ, Scientist

History
- Founder: Mary Baker Eddy

Architecture
- Functional status: Active
- Architect(s): Franklin I. Welch (1894); Charles Brigham (1904–1906); S.S. Beman (1904–1906)
- Architectural type: Romanesque (Original Mother Church); Italian Renaissance (Mother Church Extension)
- Groundbreaking: 1893
- Completed: 1894 (Original Mother Church); 1906 (Mother Church Extension)

Specifications
- Capacity: 900 (Original Mother Church); 3,000 (Mother Church Extension)

The First Church of Christ, Scientist is the administrative headquarters and mother church of the Church of Christ, Scientist, also known as the Christian Science church. Christian Science was founded in the 19th century in Lynn, Massachusetts, by Mary Baker Eddy with the publication of her book Science and Health (1875).

The First Church of Christ, Scientist, is located in the 13.5-acre (55,000 m^{2}) Christian Science Plaza in Boston, Massachusetts. The center is owned by the church and contains the Original Mother Church (1894); Mother Church Extension (1906); Christian Science Publishing House (1934), which houses the Mary Baker Eddy Library; Reflection Hall (1971); Administration Building (1972); and Colonnade Building (1972). There is also a reflecting pool and fountain.

== History ==
The Original Mother Church was designed by Franklin I. Welch, and the cornerstone was laid on May 21, 1894. The church was completed in December 1894, eight years after the first Christian Science church, First Church of Christ, Scientist (Oconto, Wisconsin), was built by local women who felt they had been helped by the religion.

Although fairly large for the time, the original church, a Richardsonian Romanesque stone structure, is often overlooked as it is dwarfed by the much larger domed Mother Church Extension. Designed to fit on a kite-shaped lot, the former features a 126-foot (38 m) steeple and an octagonal auditorium that seats 900. It is built of granite from New Hampshire, Mary Baker Eddy's home state.

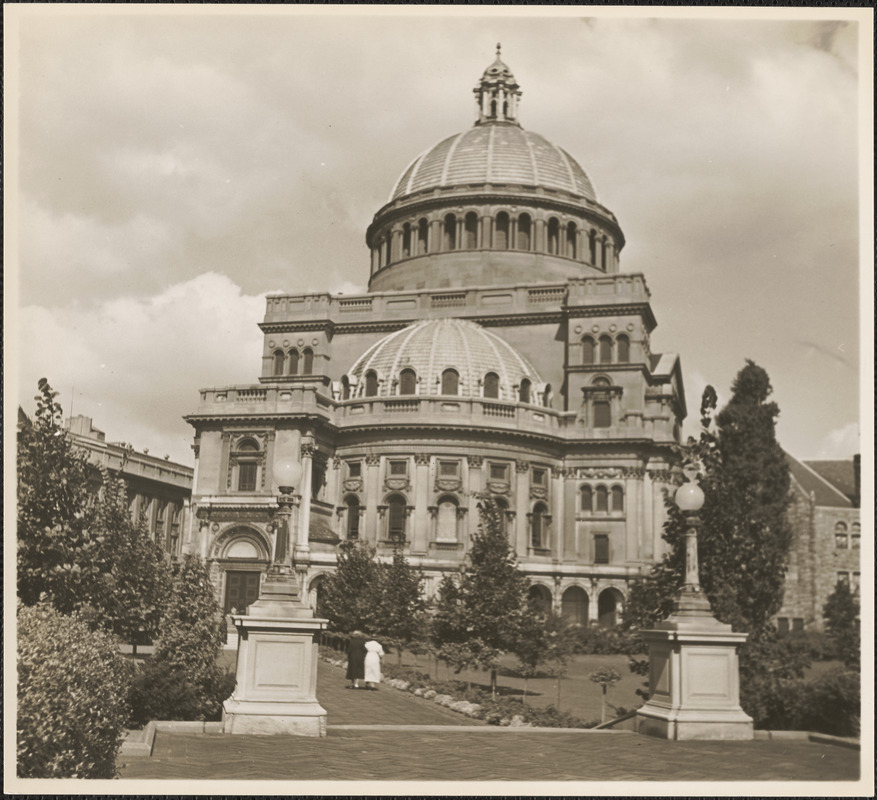
The First Church of Christ, Scientist, September 6, 1937. Leon Abdalian Collection, Boston Public Library

Added in 1904–1906, the Mother Church Extension was originally designed by Charles Brigham, but was substantially modified by S. S. Beman, who took over construction in 1905 as a result of Brigham's illness. In particular, Beman minimized the Byzantine elements, bringing the domed structure in line with the Neoclassical style that Beman favored as most appropriate for Christian Science churches. It boasts one of the world's largest pipe organs, built in 1952 by the Aeolian-Skinner Company of Boston. The sanctuary, located on the second floor, seats around 3,000.

== Christian Science Plaza ==
Designed in the 1960s by the firm I.M. Pei & Partners (Araldo Cossutta and I. M. Pei, design partners), the 13.5-acre (55,000 m^{2}) Christian Science Plaza along Huntington Avenue includes a large administration building, a colonnade, a reflecting pool and fountain, and Reflection Hall (the former Sunday School building). The site is one of Boston's most recognizable sites and a popular tourist attraction.

The Mary Baker Eddy Library is housed on the site in an 11-story structure originally built for the Christian Science Publishing Society. Constructed between 1932 and 1934, the neoclassical-style building with its Mapparium, a walk-through inside-out globe of the world in 1934, has become an historic landmark in Boston's Back Bay. Restoration of the library's 81,000-square-foot (7,500 m^{2}) portion of the building began in 1998, and the final renovation and additional construction were completed in 2002.

== Branch churches ==
The First Church of Christ, Scientist, also known as The Mother Church, has branch churches around the world. In accordance with the Manual of The Mother Church, the Mother Church is the only Christian Science church to use the definite article ("the") in its title. Branch churches are named "First Church of Christ, Scientist", "Second Church of Christ, Scientist", and so on, followed by the name of the city, in the order in which they were built in that city (for example, Seventeenth Church of Christ, Scientist, Chicago). (Note: Mary Baker Eddy, Manual of the Mother Church: "'The First Church of Christ, Scientist,' is the legal title of The Mother Church. Branch churches of The Mother Church may take the title of First Church of Christ, Scientist; Second Church of Christ, Scientist; and so on, where more than one church is established in the same place; but the article 'The' must not be used before titles of branch churches, nor written on applications for membership in naming such churches.")

Carol Norton, a student of Eddy's, and a practitioner and teacher of Christian Science, described the relationship between the First Church of Christ, Scientist and its branch churches as similar to the relationship between the federal government of the United States and the individual states. In his short booklet entitled The Christian Science Movement, he states that branch churches are "congregational in government, and individual and independent in the conduct of their own affairs, yet all accept the Tenets of the Mother Church."

== Gallery ==
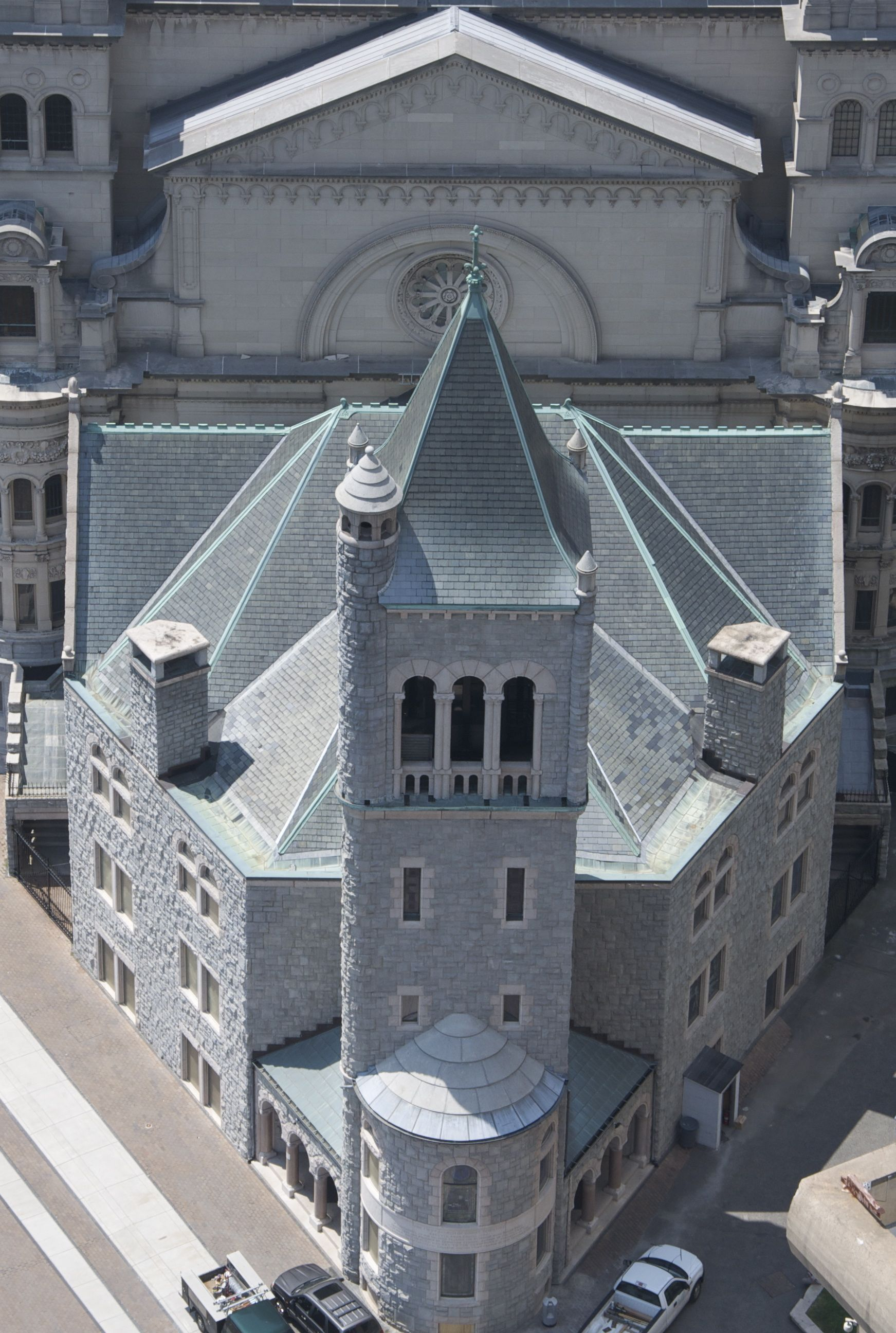
Original Mother Church (1894)

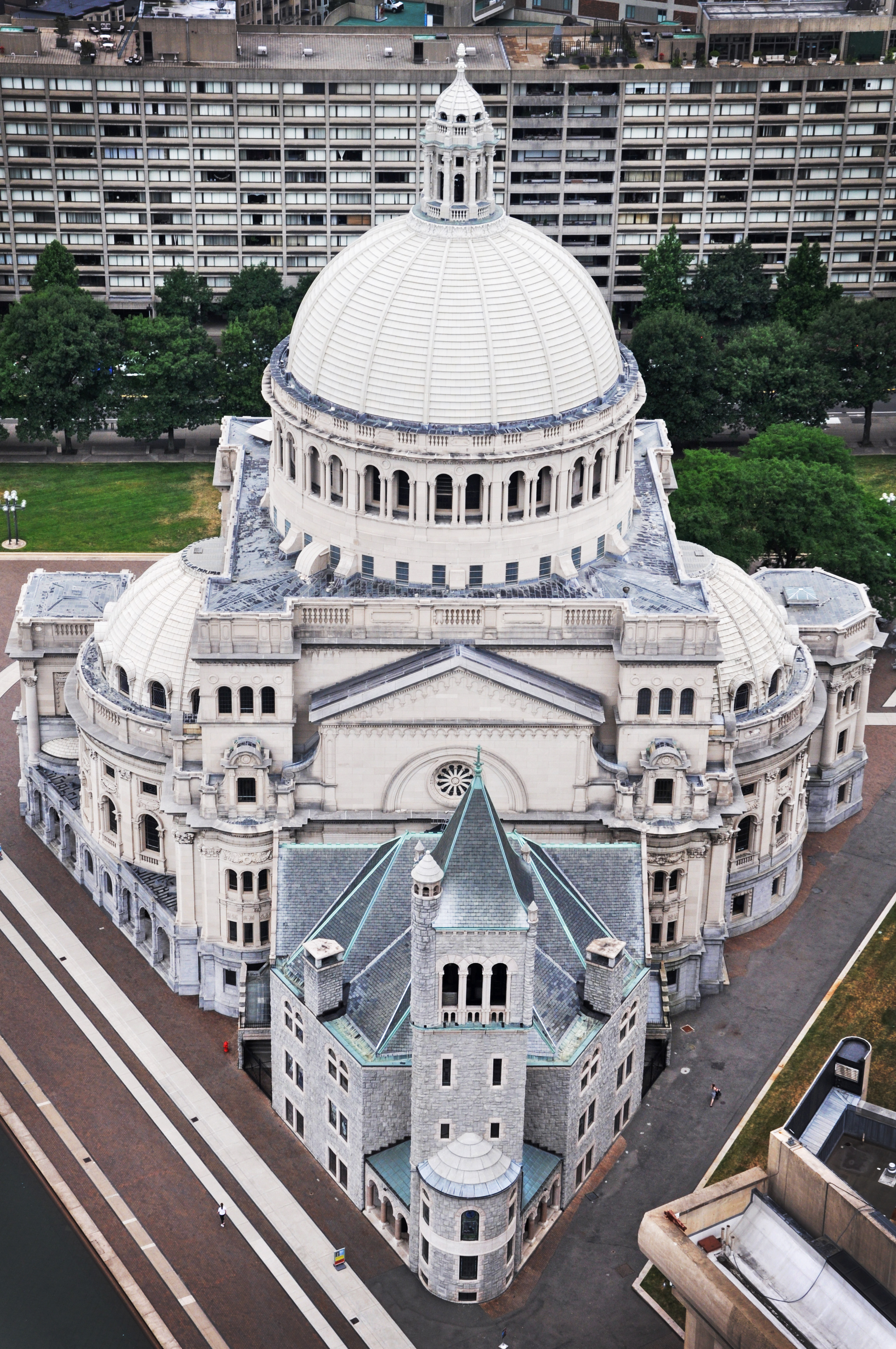
Original church with the domed Mother Church Extension (1906)

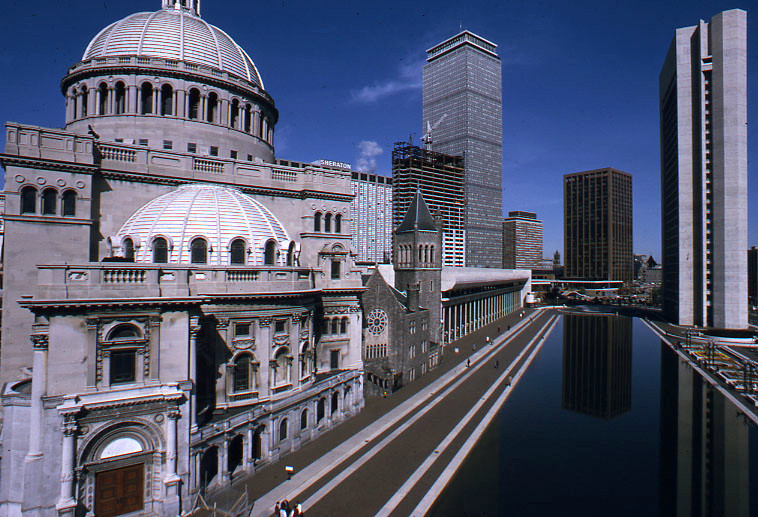
Mother Church Extension, original Mother Church, reflecting pool, and (far right) the Administration Building (1972)

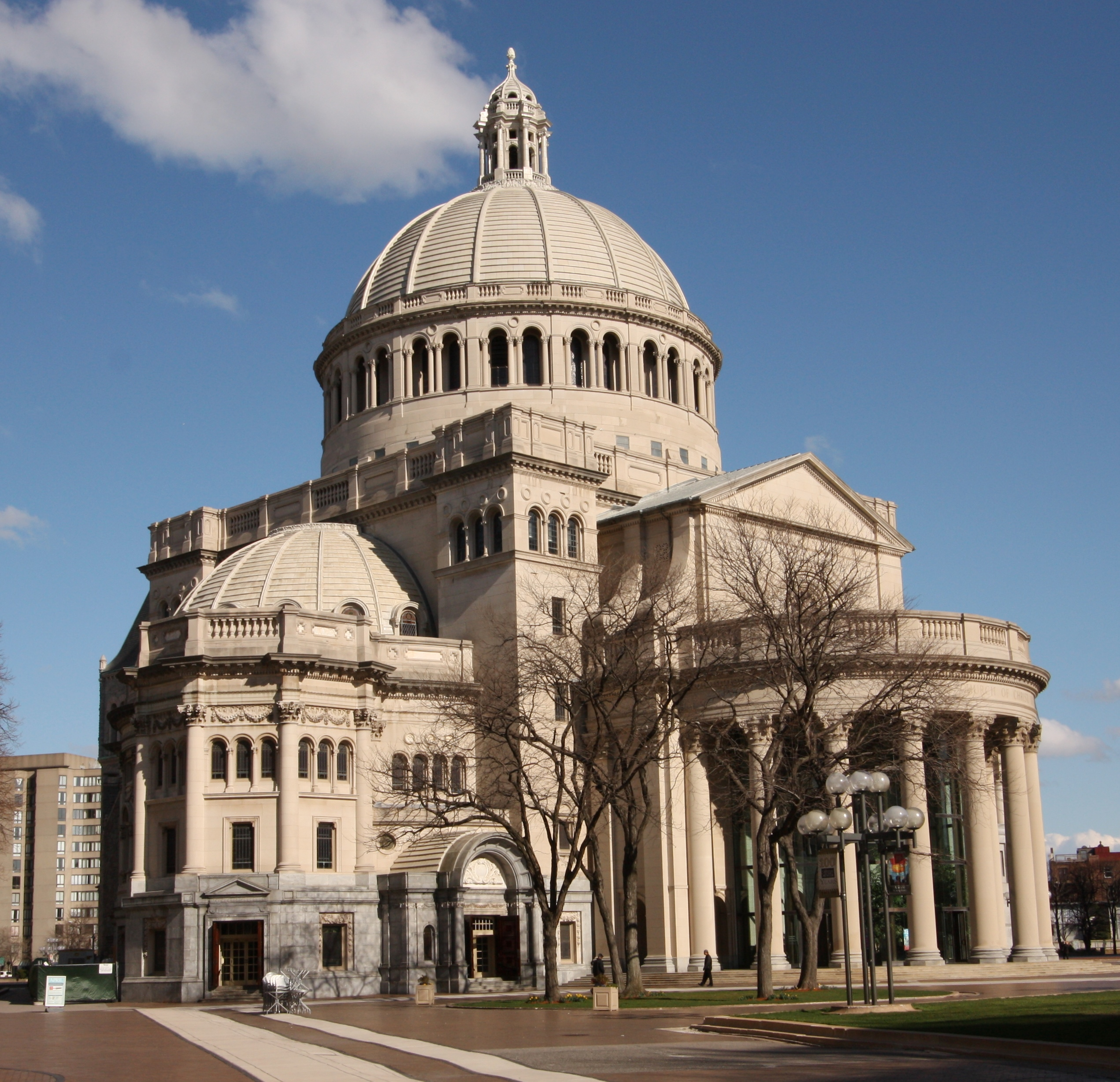
Mother Church Extension
