= Mary Baker Eddy Library =

Library in Boston, Massachusetts, U.S.

Coordinates: 42°20′42.4″N 71°5′10.0″W

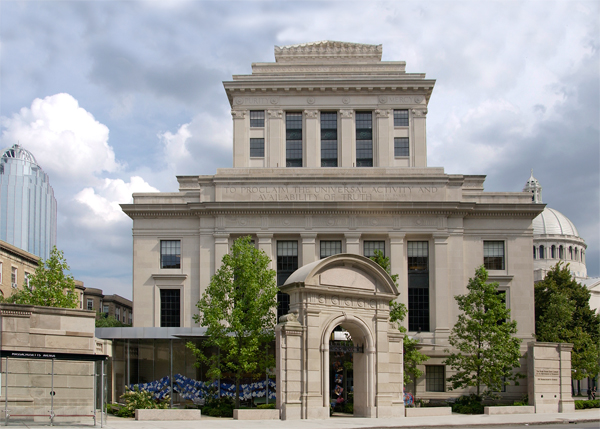
Mary Baker Eddy Library, 200 Massachusetts Avenue

The Mary Baker Eddy Library is a research library, museum, and repository for the papers of Mary Baker Eddy, the founder of Christian Science.

The library is located on the Christian Science Center on Massachusetts Avenue in Boston, Massachusetts, and housed in a portion of the 11-story structure originally built for the Christian Science Publishing Society. While the library holds the archive for the letters and manuscripts of Mary Baker Eddy which have been open to the public and scholars since 2002, it also contains other exhibits, including the Mapparium, a three-story stained-glass globe that allows visitors to stand inside a globe depicting the world of 1934.

== Christian Science Publishing Society building ==
The Christian Science Publishing Society building is one of several structures on the Christian Science Plaza. The plaza was expanded in the 1970s with a design by Araldo Cossutta, Architect-in-Charge, for I. M. Pei & Partners. The building was created of limestone and granite, and designed by a local architect, Chester Lindsay Churchill. It originally housed all publishing-related activities of the Church, including massive printing presses and bindery equipment. Engravings on the exterior of the building include the words Purity and Mercy (facing Massachusetts Avenue), Peace and Faith (facing the Mother Church extension), and Hope and Love (facing Clearway Street), as well as verses from the Bible.

== Mapparium ==
The Mapparium is the main exhibit at the library. It is a three-story, inverted globe consisting of 608 stained-glass panels. Visitors walk through the globe via a thirty-foot glass bridge from which they can stand in the middle of the world. Standing in the center of the bridge, a person can see the entire globe with none of the distortions most maps cause.

The Mapparium's other notable features were actually completely unintentional: its spherical shape and glass construction create multiple unique acoustic effects. Standing in the center of the globe, directly under the North Star, one can hear their voice in surround sound, as though they were speaking into their own ears. At either end of the bridge, visitors can also whisper from one doorway and be heard perfectly from the opposite side, 30 feet away, in a "whispering gallery" effect.

Since the Mapparium was built in 1935, none of the panels have been updated, although one was replaced after being damaged. Visitors to the Mapparium may notice such historic differences as Africa depicted as a patchwork of colonies and the USSR united as one nation. In 2002, LED lights were installed around the globe and, together with an original composition of words and music, highlight these and other major changes since its creation in 1935.

== Archive and collections ==
=== Historic Bible collection ===
The Library houses over 460 Bibles including a rare Coverdale Bible (1535) and Tyndale Bible (1550); as well as first editions of the Matthew Bible (1537), Great Bible (1539), Bishops' Bible (1568), Geneva Bible (1560), and King James Bible (1611). The collection is available at the Library and on the web.

=== Mary Baker Eddy papers ===
Since 2014 the Library has started putting their collection of Eddy's letters, sermons, drafts of writings, notes, and more online at mbepapers.org. The collection includes over 28,000 letters written by Eddy throughout her life, and over 35,000 letters addressed to her.

=== Research & Reference Services ===
Since its opening in 2002, the church archives have been open to scholars, and have helped produce works in a variety of fields. Research & Reference Services is located on the fourth floor of the Library and provides access to original materials that document the life of Mary Baker Eddy, the church that she founded, and more. The collections include letters, manuscripts, organizational records, photographs, artifacts, books, periodicals, audiovisuals, and other materials available for in-depth research. Specific collections include the Calvin A. Frye diaries, Georgine Milmine collection, and organizational records for the church and publishing society.

Short term research fellowships are available to scholars to support original research.
