= Paranoia =

Psychotic disorder

- Other names: Paranoid (adjective)
- Pronunciation: /pærəˈnɔɪə/
- Specialty: Psychiatry, clinical psychology
- Symptoms: Distrust, false accusations, anxiety, suspicion

In psychiatry, paranoia is a wrong perception in which a person thinks others are planning to harm them. A paranoid person may believe people are concerned with everything they are doing (for example, "Everyone is watching me", or "Talking about me"). These beliefs can also be persecutory beliefs, or beliefs of conspiracy concerning a perceived threat towards oneself (e.g., "Everyone is out to get me" or "Everyone is waiting to hurt me"). Paranoia is an instinct or thought process that is believed to be heavily influenced by anxiety, suspicion, or fear, often to the point of delusion and irrationality. Paranoia is distinct from phobias, which also involve irrational fear, but usually no blame.

Making false accusations and carrying a general distrust of other people also frequently accompany paranoia. For example, a paranoid person might believe an incident was intentional when most people would view it as an accident or coincidence. Paranoia is a central symptom of psychosis.

== Signs and symptoms ==
A common symptom of paranoia is attribution bias. These individuals typically have a biased perception of reality, often exhibiting more hostile beliefs than average. A paranoid person may view someone else's accidental behavior as though it is intentional or signifies a threat.

An investigation of a non-clinical paranoid population found that characteristics such as feeling powerless and depressed, isolating oneself, and relinquishing activities, were associated with more frequent paranoia. Some scientists have created different subtypes for the various symptoms of paranoia, including erotic, persecutory, litigious, and exalted.

Some research suggests that symptoms of paranoid personality disorder are associated with a higher number of divorces, likely due to how paranoid patterns of thinking hinder relationships. This seems to fall in line with some older sources, which allege that paranoid individuals tend to be more isolated.

== Causes ==
=== Social and environmental ===
Social circumstances appear to be highly influential on paranoid beliefs. According to a mental health survey distributed to residents of Ciudad Juárez, Chihuahua (in Mexico) and El Paso, Texas (in the United States), paranoid beliefs seem to be associated with feelings of powerlessness and victimization, enhanced by social situations. Paranoid symptoms were associated with an attitude of mistrust and an external locus of control. Citing research showing that women and those with lower socioeconomic status are more prone to locating locus of control externally, the researchers suggested that women may be especially affected by the effects of socioeconomic status on paranoia.

Surveys have revealed that paranoia can develop from difficult parental relationships and untrustworthy environments, for instance those that were highly disciplinary, strict, and unstable, could contribute to paranoia. Some sources have also noted that indulging and pampering the child could contribute to greater paranoia, via disrupting the child's understanding of their relationship with the world. Experiences found to enhance or create paranoia included frequent disappointment, stress, and a sense of hopelessness.

Discrimination has also been reported as a potential predictor of paranoid delusions. Such reports that paranoia seemed to appear more in older patients who had experienced greater discrimination throughout their lives. Immigrants are more subject to some forms of psychosis than the general population, which may be related to more frequent experiences of discrimination and humiliation.

=== Psychological ===
Many more mood-based symptoms, for example grandiosity and guilt, may underlie functional paranoia.

Colby (1981) defined paranoid cognition as "persecutory delusions and false beliefs whose propositional content clusters around ideas of being harassed, threatened, harmed, subjugated, persecuted, accused, mistreated, killed, wronged, tormented, disparaged, vilified, and so on, by malevolent others, either specific individuals or groups" (p. 518). Three components of paranoid cognition have been identified by Robins & Post: "a) suspicions without enough basis that others are exploiting, harming, or deceiving them; b) preoccupation with unjustified doubts about the loyalty, or trustworthiness, of friends or associates; c) reluctance to confide in others because of unwarranted fear that the information will be used maliciously against them" (1997, p. 3).

Paranoid cognition has been conceptualized by clinical psychology almost exclusively in terms of psychodynamic constructs and dispositional variables. From this point of view, paranoid cognition is a manifestation of an intra-psychic conflict or disturbance. For instance, Colby (1981) suggested that the biases of blaming others for one's problems serve to alleviate the distress produced by the feeling of being humiliated, and helps to repudiate the belief that the self is to blame for such incompetence. This intra-psychic perspective emphasizes that the cause of paranoid cognitions is inside the head of the people (social perceiver), and dismisses the possibility that paranoid cognition may be related to the social context in which such cognitions are embedded. This point is extremely relevant because when origins of distrust and suspicion (two components of paranoid cognition) are studied many researchers have accentuated the importance of social interaction, particularly when social interaction has gone awry. Even more, a model of trust development pointed out that trust increases or decreases as a function of the cumulative history of interaction between two or more persons.

Another relevant difference can be discerned among "pathological and non-pathological forms of trust and distrust". According to Deutsch, the main difference is that non-pathological forms are flexible and responsive to changing circumstances. Pathological forms reflect exaggerated perceptual biases and judgmental predispositions that can arise and perpetuate them, are reflexively caused errors similar to a self-fulfilling prophecy.

It has been suggested that a "hierarchy" of paranoia exists, extending from mild social evaluative concerns, through ideas of social reference, to persecutory beliefs concerning mild, moderate, and severe threats.

=== Physical ===
A paranoid reaction may be caused from a decline in brain circulation as a result of high blood pressure or hardening of the arterial walls.

Drug-induced paranoia, associated with cannabis and stimulants like amphetamines or methamphetamine, has much in common with schizophrenic paranoia; the relationship has been under investigation since 2012. Drug-induced paranoia has a better prognosis than schizophrenic paranoia once the drug has been removed. For further information, see stimulant psychosis and substance-induced psychosis.

Based on data obtained by the Dutch NEMESIS project in 2005, there was an association between impaired hearing and the onset of symptoms of psychosis, which was based on a five-year follow up. Some older studies have actually declared that a state of paranoia can be produced in patients that were under a hypnotic state of deafness. This idea however generated much skepticism during its time.

== Diagnosis ==
In the DSM-IV-TR, paranoia is diagnosed in the form of:

- Paranoid personality disorder (F60.0)
- Paranoid schizophrenia (a subtype of schizophrenia) (F20.0)
- The persecutory type of delusional disorder (F22.8)

According to clinical psychologist P. J. McKenna, "As a noun, paranoia denotes a disorder which has been argued in and out of existence, and whose clinical features, course, boundaries, and virtually every other aspect of which is controversial. Employed as an adjective, paranoid has become attached to a diverse set of presentations, from paranoid schizophrenia, through paranoid depression, to paranoid personality—not to mention a motley collection of paranoid 'psychoses', 'reactions', and 'states'—and this is to restrict discussion to functional disorders. Even when abbreviated down to the prefix para-, the term crops up causing trouble as the contentious but stubbornly persistent concept of paraphrenia".

At least 50% of the diagnosed cases of schizophrenia experience delusions of reference and delusions of persecution. Paranoia perceptions and behavior may be part of many mental illnesses, such as depression and dementia, but they are more prevalent in three mental disorders: paranoid schizophrenia, delusional disorder (persecutory type), and paranoid personality disorder.

== Treatment ==
Paranoid delusions are often treated with antipsychotic medication, which exert a medium effect size. Cognitive behavioral therapy (CBT) lessens paranoid delusions relative to control conditions according to a meta-analysis. A meta-analysis of 43 studies reported that metacognitive training (MCT) reduces (paranoid) delusions at a medium to large effect size relative to control conditions.

== History ==
The word paranoia comes from the Greek παράνοια (paránoia), "madness", and that from παρά (pará), "beside, by" and νόος (nóos), "mind". The term was used to describe a mental illness in which a delusional belief is the sole or most prominent feature. In this definition, the belief does not have to be persecutory to be classified as paranoid, so any number of delusional beliefs can be classified as paranoia. For example, a person who has the sole delusional belief that they are an important religious figure would be classified by Kraepelin as having "pure paranoia". The word "paranoia" is associated from the Greek word "para-noeo". Its meaning was "derangement", or "departure from the normal". However, the word was used strictly and other words were used such as "insanity" or "crazy", as these words were introduced by Aulus Cornelius Celsus. The term "paranoia" first made an appearance during plays of Greek tragedians, and was also used by philosophers such as Plato and Hippocrates. Nevertheless, the word "paranoia" was the equivalent of "delirium" or "high". Eventually, the term fell out of use for two millennia. "Paranoia" was revived in the 18th century, appearing in the works of nosologists such as François Boissier de Sauvage (1759) and Rudolph August Vogel (1772).

According to Michael Phelan, Padraig Wright, and Julian Stern (2000), paranoia and paraphrenia are debated entities that were detached from dementia praecox by Kraepelin, who explained paranoia as a continuous systematized delusion arising much later in life with no presence of either hallucinations or a deteriorating course, and paraphrenia as an identical syndrome to paranoia but with hallucinations. Even at the present time, a delusion need not be suspicious or fearful to be classified as paranoid. A person might be diagnosed with paranoid schizophrenia without delusions of persecution, simply because the delusions refer mainly to the self.

== Relations to violence ==
It has generally been agreed upon that individuals with paranoid delusions will have the tendency to take action based on their beliefs. More research is needed on the particular types of actions that are pursued based on paranoid delusions. Some researchers have made attempts to distinguish the different variations of actions brought on as a result of delusions. Wessely et al. (1993) did just this by studying individuals with delusions of which more than half had reportedly taken action or behaved as a result of these delusions. However, the overall actions were not of a violent nature in most of the informants. The authors note that other studies such as one by Taylor (1985), have shown that violent behaviors were more common in certain types of paranoid individuals, mainly those considered to be offensive such as prisoners.

Other researchers have found associations between childhood abusive behaviors and the appearance of violent behaviors in psychotic individuals. This could be a result of their inability to cope with aggression as well as other people, especially when constantly attending to potential threats in their environment. The attention to threat itself has been proposed as one of the major contributors of violent actions in paranoid people, although there has been much deliberation about this as well. Other studies have shown that there may only be certain types of delusions that promote any violent behaviors, persecutory delusions seem to be one of these.

Having resentful emotions towards others and the inability to understand what other people are feeling seem to have an association with violence in paranoid individuals. This was based on a study of people with paranoid schizophrenia (one of the common mental disorders that exhibit paranoid symptoms) theories of mind capabilities in relation to empathy. The results of this study revealed specifically that although the violent patients were more successful at the higher level theory of mind tasks, they were not as able to interpret others' emotions or claims.

== Paranoid social cognition ==
Social psychological research has proposed a mild form of paranoid cognition, paranoid social cognition, that has its origins in social determinants more than intra-psychic conflict. This perspective states that in milder forms, paranoid cognitions may be very common among normal individuals. For instance, it is not considered strange to have self-centered thoughts of being talked about, or to be suspicious of others' intentions, or to assume ill-will or hostility (e.g., a feeling of everything going against them). According to Kramer (1998), these milder forms of paranoid cognition may be considered an adaptive response to cope with or make sense of a disturbing and threatening social environment.

Paranoid cognition captures the idea that dysphoric self-consciousness may be related to the position a person occupies in a social system. This self-consciousness conduces to a hypervigilant and ruminative mode to process social information that finally will stimulate a variety of paranoid-like forms of social misperception and misjudgment. This model identifies four components that are essential to understanding paranoid social cognition: situational antecedents, dysphoric self-consciousness, hypervigilance and rumination, and judgmental biases.

=== Situational antecedents ===
Perceived social distinctiveness, perceived evaluative scrutiny and uncertainty about the social standing.

- Perceived social distinctiveness: According to the social identity theory, people categorize themselves in terms of characteristics that made them unique or different from others under certain circumstances. Gender, ethnicity, age, or experience may become extremely relevant to explain people's behavior when these attributes make them unique in a social group. This distinctive attribute may have influence not only in how people are perceived, but may also affect the way they perceive themselves.
- Perceived evaluative scrutiny: According to this model, dysphoric self-consciousness may increase when people feel under moderate or intensive evaluative social scrutiny such as when an asymmetric relationship is analyzed. For example, when asked about relationships, doctoral students remembered events that they interpreted as significant to their degree of trust in their advisors when compared with their advisors. This suggests that students are willing to pay more attention to their advisor than their advisor is to them. Also, students spent more time ruminating about behaviors, events, and their relationship in general.
- Uncertainty about social standing: Knowledge about social standing is another factor that may induce paranoid social cognition. Many researchers have argued that experiencing uncertainty about a social position in a social system constitutes an adverse psychological state, one which people are highly motivated to reduce.

=== Dysphoric self-consciousness ===
An aversive form of heightened 'public self-consciousness' is characterized by the feelings that one is under intensive evaluation or scrutiny. Becoming self-tormenting will increase the odds of interpreting others' behaviors in a self-referential way.

=== Hypervigilance and rumination ===
Self-consciousness was characterized as an aversive psychological state. According to this model, people experiencing self-consciousness will be highly motivated to reduce it, trying to make sense of what they are experiencing. These attempts promote hypervigilance and rumination in a circular relationship: more hypervigilance generates more rumination, whereupon more rumination generates more hypervigilance. Hypervigilance can be thought of as a way to appraise threatening social information, but in contrast to adaptive vigilance, hypervigilance will produce elevated levels of arousal, fear, anxiety, and threat perception. Rumination is another possible response to threatening social information. Rumination can be related to the paranoid social cognition because it can increase negative thinking about negative events, and evoke a pessimistic explanatory style.

=== Judgmental and cognitive biases ===
Three main judgmental consequences have been identified:

- The sinister attribution error: This bias captures the tendency that social perceivers have to overattribute lack of trustworthiness to others.
- The overly personalistic construal of social interaction: Refers to the inclination that paranoid perceiver has to interpret others' action in a disproportional self-referential way, increasing the belief that they are the target of others' thoughts and actions. A special kind of bias in the biased punctuation of social interaction, which entail an overperception of causal linking among independent events.
- The exaggerated perception of conspiracy: Refers to the disposition that the paranoid perceiver has to overattribute social coherence and coordination to others' actions.

Meta-analyses have confirmed that individuals with paranoia tend to jump to conclusions and are incorrigible in their judgements, even for delusion-neutral scenarios.

== See also ==
- Anxiety
- Apophenia
- Borderline personality disorder
- Case of Aimée
- Conspiracy theory
- Delusions of reference
- Distrust
- Fusion paranoia
- Hysteria
- Ideas of reference
- Monomania
- Narcissistic personality disorder
- Paranoid fiction
- Paranoid personality disorder
- Post-traumatic stress disorder
- Pronoia
- Querulant
- Schizophrenia
- Schizotypal personality disorder
- Soft resistance
- Whispers: The Voices of Paranoia
