= Budd Hopkins =

American artist, author, ufologist (1931–2011)

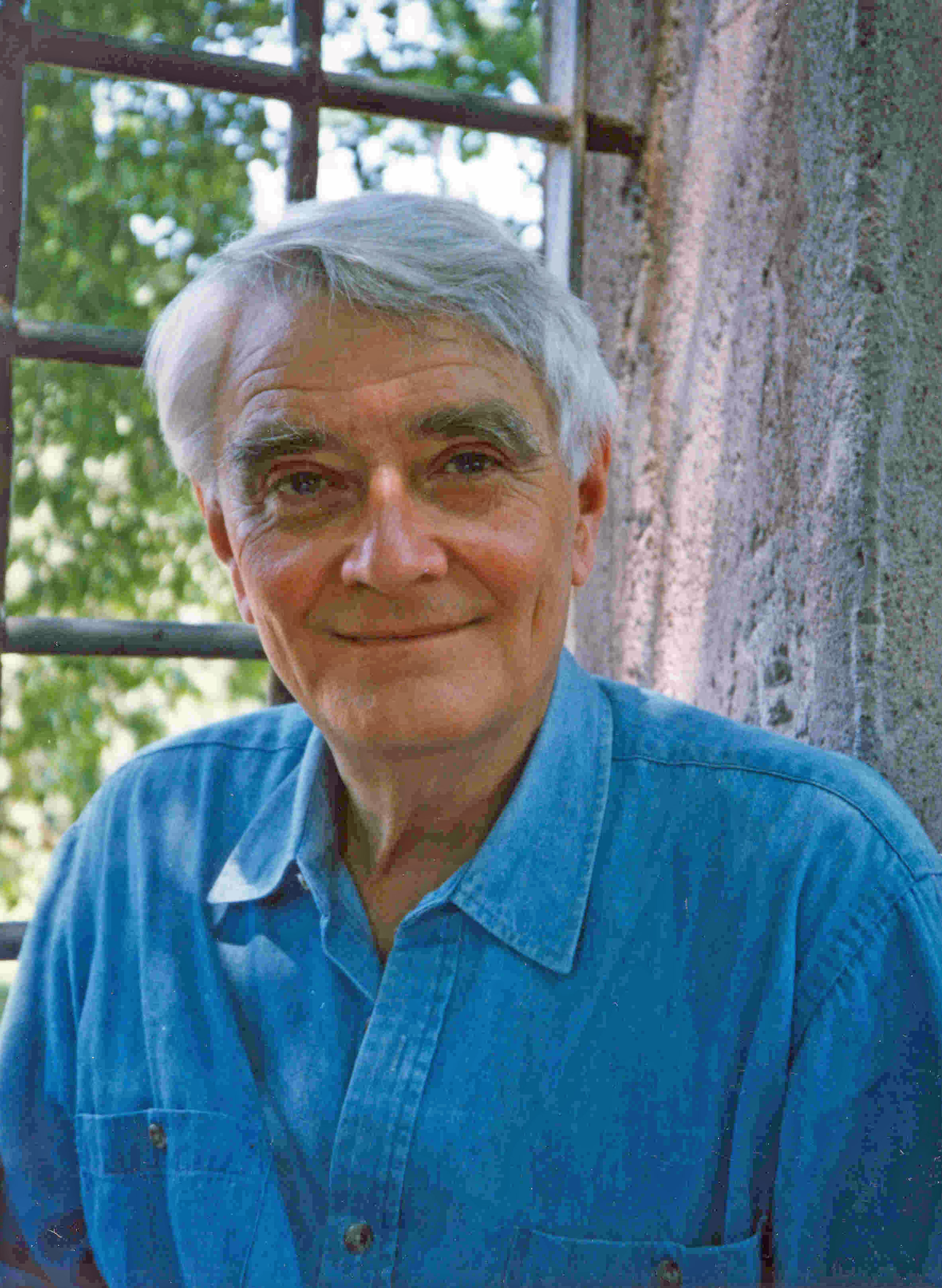
- Hopkins in 1997
- Born: Elliot Budd Hopkins; June 15, 1931; Wheeling, West Virginia, U.S.
- Died: August 21, 2011 (aged 80); New York, New York, U.S.
- Education: Oberlin College (B.A.)
- Occupations: Artist; author; ufologist
- Organization: Intruders Foundation
- Spouses: Joan Rich (1956–1969); April Kingsley (1973–1991); Carol Rainey (1996–2006)
- Website: http://www.buddhopkins.net/

Elliot Budd Hopkins (June 15, 1931 – August 21, 2011) was an American artist, author, and ufologist. He was a prominent figure in alien abduction phenomena and related UFO research.

== Early life ==
Elliot Budd Hopkins was born in 1931. He was raised in Wheeling, West Virginia. He lived with his parents, Elliot B. Hopkins and Eleanor A. Hopkins, brother, Stuart, and sister, Eleanor. At age two, Hopkins contracted polio. During the long recovery process, Hopkins developed an interest in drawing and watercolors, which eventually led him to Oberlin College, Oberlin, Ohio, where he graduated with a bachelor's degree in art history in 1953. It was here, Hopkins was exposed to art with "a capital A", and attended a lecture by Robert Motherwell that first introduced him to the "automatic, gestural approach that Motherwell espoused."

From Oberlin, Hopkins moved to New York City, where he met Franz Kline, Mark Rothko, Robert Motherwell, Willem de Kooning and other abstract expressionists. For a time, Hopkins studied art history at Columbia University and worked a low-level job selling tickets at the Museum of Modern Art. His experimentation with collage techniques and style as an abstract expressionist won him national acclaim.

== Art career ==
Hopkins' first solo show was held in New York City in 1956, the same year he met and married his first wife of thirteen years, Joan Rich. In 1963, Hopkins' work was included in American Painters, a film documentary of American artists and styles with commentary from Alfred Barr of the Museum of Modern Art, Thomas Hess of Art News Magazine, Sidney Janis, gallery director, and Harold Rosenberg, art critic.

In 1969, the San Francisco Museum of Modern Art acquired Hopkins' Norbeck Yellow Vertical, describing him as "a leading American painter who has successfully brought together the vocabularies of painterly abstraction and hard edge painting." In 1972, Hopkins was among five artists whose work was commissioned as part of a statewide effort to support the creative arts in West Virginia. It was, Governor Arch Moore claimed, "the first project of this kind to be undertaken in the nation." The piece was to be displayed in the state's cultural center located near the Capitol.

In 1976, Hopkins was awarded a Guggenheim Fellowship for painting.

=== Exhibits ===
Hopkins exhibited his paintings and sculptures in museums, galleries such as Andre Zarre, Levis Fine Art and Poindexter (New York) and Jan Cicero (Chicago), and universities throughout the United States.

Hopkins had a major retrospective exhibition at the Provincetown Art Association and Museum in mid-2017.

The Whitney Museum, Washington Gallery of Modern Art, Metropolitan Museum of Art, Museum of Modern Art, Corcoran Gallery of Art, the British Museum, include Hopkins' work in their permanent collections.

== Art style ==
Hopkins' paintings in the 1960s combined the precise, hard-edge geometric shapes he was enthralled with and drawn to as a child with gestural, atmospheric painting characteristic of second- and later-generation Abstract Expressionists. "I had come to understand that an abstract painting at its most powerful was a kind of aesthetic scrim behind which lurks a concealed, obsessive 'thing' or image of some kind, transformed, made palatable by the artist's mediating skills."

Hopkins viewed collage as an artistic technique and a philosophical, aesthetic means of unifying a disjointed and fragmented world. He saw collage, the assemblage of fragments and varying points of view, in the poetry, painting, sculpture, music, architecture, and, especially, motion pictures of his day:

"Consciously or unconsciously, contemporary artists work to create harmony from distinctly jarring material, forcing warring ideas, materials and spatial systems into a tense and perhaps arbitrary detente. Seen most broadly, the presence of the collage aesthetic is the sole defining quality of modernism in all the arts."

Hopkins worked to achieve harmony, clarity and precision while maintaining a sense of mystery:

"I like neither extreme in art wholeheartedly, neither the purified world of geometrical art nor the free, indulgent world of Expressionism."

In the 1970s, Hopkins' work included a series of assembled paintings, incorporating architectural elements. Sculptures such as Gallatin's Drive I, White City Hall, New York Wall II and others bore urban names and echoed elements of New York City's skyline. Many of his works during this time featured circular shapes with primary colors set against black and white backgrounds suggestive of Piet Mondrian.

Later, Hopkins included abstracted figures in his sculptural pieces. While moving away from Abstract Expressionism, Hopkins retained in his work the use of intense colors and hard-edged forms. His works of the 1980s, including Temples and Guardians, featured these "sentinals" who were, according to Hopkins, "participating in a frozen ritual, fixed – absolutely – within a privileged space..." Though Hopkins denied any connection, some critics viewed these ritualistic pieces as an extension of Hopkins' fascination with alien beings. Hopkins viewed his sculpted guardians not as human per se, but as magical, fierce, noble robots of the unconscious.

== Interest in UFOs ==
As a child, Hopkins experienced, firsthand, Orson Welles' 1938 radio play The War of the Worlds. This both terrified Hopkins and his family and left psychic scars. He considered the radio play a dramatic, theatrical hoax and, because of his childhood scare, felt it added to his skepticism about alien invasions rather than enamor him to the idea of it.

His interest in UFOs and alien visitations was renewed when, in August 1964, Hopkins and two others reported experiencing a day time sighting of an unidentified flying object, or UFO, in the form of a darkish, elliptical object off Cape Cod in Truro, Massachusetts. Dissatisfied with the response Hopkins received when he reported the incident to nearby Otis Air National Guard Base, he suspected a possible government cover-up. Hopkins began reading about UFOs and collecting stories of people who claimed to have experienced contact with alien beings.

In 1975, Hopkins was approached by George O'Barski who, purportedly, witnessed alien figures step out of a spacecraft and take soil samples at North Hudson Park in North Bergen, New Jersey. Hopkins, Ted Bloecher, then director of New York State's Mutual UFO Network (MUFON), and Jerry Stoehrer, also of MUFON, investigated the incident, interviewing the witness and taking soil samples.

After Hopkins' account of the O'Barski case appeared in The Village Voice in 1976, he began receiving regular letters from other UFO witnesses, including a few cases of missing time, seemingly inexplicable gaps in abductees' memories. Hopkins, using data from his investigations with Bloecher and psychologist Aphrodite Clamar, expanded this idea in his book Missing Time.

Behavioral patterns extrapolated from abductee letters led Hopkins to identify core emotional responses based on their experiences: fear, awe or wonderment at alien technological abilities, affection toward their captors (which he likened to the "Patty Hearst" syndrome), anger, and helplessness. He believed aliens were either incapable of understanding the psychological effects of their encounters with humans or that they were a "callous, indifferent, amoral race bent solely upon gratifying its own scientific needs at whatever cost to us."

After the publication of his book Missing Time in 1981, Hopkins became known as much for his UFO and abduction research as for his art. As a self-described humanist, Hopkins saw his work with alleged alien abduction victims as a way to bring attention to an otherwise marginalized part of society. His follow-up book Intruders: The Incredible Visitations at Copley Woods, published in 1987, helped establish Hopkins as a prominent leader in the UFO movement.

Hopkins' Intruders: The Incredible Visitations at Copley Woods (1987), spent four weeks on The New York Times Paperback Best Seller list. It and other best-sellers on the phenomena, including Whitley Strieber's Communion (1987), prompted stories of alien abduction by people who read the books. Abductee Linda Cortile had also participated in Hopkins' support group, starting five months before her alleged abduction, and read his book, Intruders.

In 1989, Hopkins organized the Intruders Foundation in Manhattan to provide support for alleged victims of alien abduction, conduct research and investigations, and promote public awareness of the phenomenon.

The 1992 made-for-television film Intruders featured fictionalized characters based on the works of Hopkins and psychiatrist John E. Mack, and, like Hopkins' book of the same name, portrayed abduction scenarios.

In 1996, Hopkins' book Witnessed: The True Story of the Brooklyn Bridge UFO Abductions was published. The book portrayed an abduction case that was alleged to have occurred in late 1989 near the Brooklyn Bridge in New York City.

Hopkins and his third wife, Carol Rainey, co-wrote the 2003 book Sight Unseen, Science, UFO Invisibility and Transgenic Beings.

=== Alien abduction claims ===
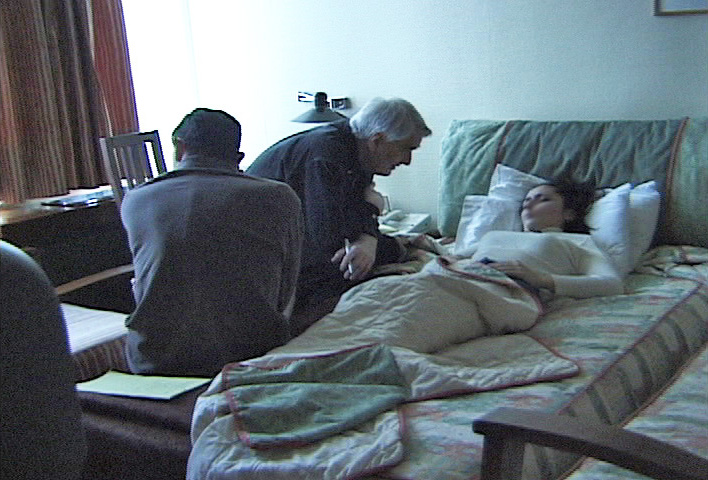
Budd Hopkins and John Mack, hypnosis session, Istanbul

Hopkins is often credited with popularizing the idea of alien abductions as genetic experimentation through the publication of his book Intruders. He has been dubbed "father of the abduction movement" by some.

Hopkins, along with Elizabeth Slater, who conducted psychological tests of abductees, likened these experiences to rape, specifically for the purpose of human reproductive capabilities. In fact, Hopkins was inclined to dismiss his clients' conscious memory of abuse for more alien explanations. He was an alarmist, rather than a spiritualist, in his approach to the alien visitations, believing the visitations to be apocalyptic and that no good could come of these encounters. He described victims' experiences as severe and nightmarish.

While both men and women reported to Hopkins abductions by aliens that included sexual encounters, allegedly for some form of extraterrestrial eugenics, women in particular seemed to be a part of a "highly technological colonization scheme." These victims were, reportedly, taken to spaceships, impregnated by extraterrestrials, then later as the hybrid baby developed, returned to the ship to have the fetus removed and given up to the alien parent. The alien parents, purportedly, had the ability to communicate telepathically with their child. On occasion, according to victims' reports as told by Hopkins, the human parents were allowed to see their human-alien hybrid, or transgenic, children. Once a victim, according to Hopkins, abductees were powerless over the intrusions and susceptible to additional kidnappings, which may extend to their (human) children. "If people have had one abduction experience," Hopkins said, "then they will have others."

Critics of Hopkins' views on alien abductions state that the alien abduction phenomenon is not as mysterious as Hopkins makes it out to be. Much of the phenomenon can, according to researchers such as Ronald K. Siegel of the University of California, Los Angeles, be explained as the consequence of "normal hallucinatory powers of the brain."

Sleep paralysis, for example, can produce the feeling that one is paralyzed or has difficulty moving. It can also produce the effect of floating or the sense of an out-of-body experience. Sleep paralysis occurs in a transition time and the person is in a dream-like state, hallucinations can occur just before falling asleep (hynogogic hallucination) or just after (hypnopompic hallucination). These hallucinations feel real to the person experiencing sleep paralysis and can often be accompanied by sensory features: musty smells, shuffling sounds, visions of ghosts, aliens, and monsters. Neuroscientist Michael Persinger of Laurentian University in Greater Sudbury, Ontario, Canada, believes that these sensations can spontaneously occur in some people, given the right set of circumstances, leading to the kind of feelings of "tremendous meaningfulness and fear" sometimes expressed by alleged alien abductees. Hopkins rejected the idea of sleep paralysis, calling it "the big explanation du jour", and an inadequate explanation for those who experience abductions outside the bedroom.

==== Roper poll ====
Hopkins partnered with David M. Jacobs, history professor at Temple University, Philadelphia, PA, and John Mack, psychiatry professor at Harvard University, Cambridge, Massachusetts, to design a Roper poll to find out how many of the nearly 6,000 respondents surveyed had experienced what the three believed to be symptoms indicative of alien abductions. The poll was released in 1991. If generalized to the population at large, the survey results indicated that several million Americans are regularly affected by alien abductions.

Critics of the survey questioned the validity of the survey questions themselves and pointed out the implausibility that an average of 340 Americans could be abducted daily, given the fact that no physical evidence to date exists for any UFO abduction.

==== Support groups ====
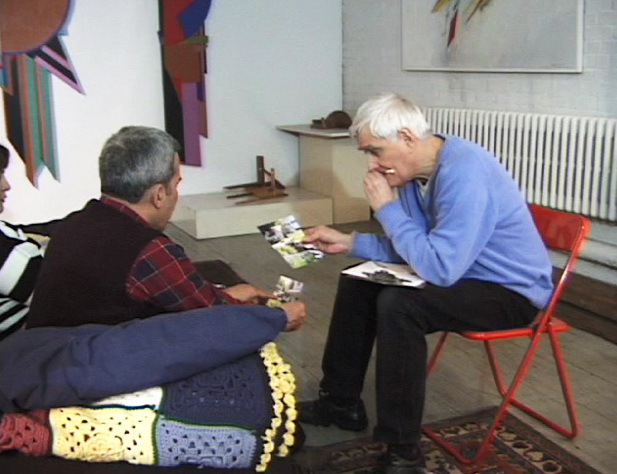
Hopkins with new abductee

Hopkins met and encouraged self-proclaimed abductees to discuss their experiences by holding free monthly group therapy sessions. Groups such as this were reported at the time as the most recent development in UFO-mania. Attendees represented people from all walks of life: attorneys, police officers, teachers, airline pilots, psychologists, psychiatrists, and the like. Drawing as many as 20 people each month, these support meetings were, according to Hopkins, like other New York social events, complete with "dinner and a lot of social chatter."

Hopkins, trained as an artist not as a psychotherapist or social worker, described the people who attended these groups as veterans of trauma. They were, in his view, victims who experienced often intrusive and painful physical examinations by their alien abductors and whose stories were best told through hypnosis. Abduction memories, according to Hopkins, rarely emerged unaided and may, at first, present to the abductees as "vague anxieties, specific phobias, bad dreams, fragmentary and disturbing memories, or what seemed like an explicable episode of missing time."

Many of his attendees contacted Hopkins after reading his books or newspaper advertisements that included his books as reference material, seeing him on television programs such as Will Shriner, Sally Jessy Raphael, the Marsha Warfield Show, Charles Grodin and others. Some critics interpreted these television appearances as a way for Hopkins and other UFO authors such as Whitley Strieber to recruit possible abductees.

Still other support group members attended the many UFO conferences held within the United States and internationally at which Hopkins was a speaker.

==== Hypnosis ====
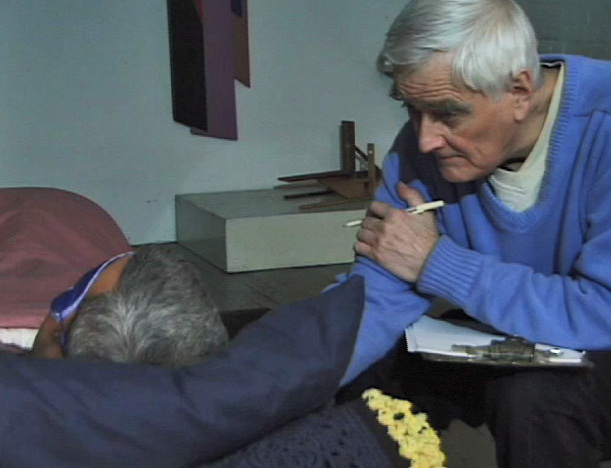
Hopkins, hypnosis with abductee

Although Hopkins had no formal psychological training, he watched other professionals over an eight-year period and developed his own techniques. In his opinion, these professionals, notably Robert Naiman, Aphrodite Clamar, and Girard Franklin were quite skeptical of the reality of abduction claims, yet all uncovered detailed abduction scenarios from their patients.

According to Hopkins, any feeling of uneasiness about a place, or any sense of lost time (that is often accounted for by daydreaming), could be attributed to alien abduction. He believed aliens were capable of blocking or submerging memories in the people they abducted. Despite critics' warnings that practices such as the ones in which Hopkins engaged may cause serious psychological damage to the alleged abductees, Hopkins insisted that regressive hypnosis could unlock the experiences of his clients. He gave little credence to experts such as psychologist Robert A. Baker, University of Kentucky, whose scientific inquiries into the subject revealed that hypnosis can "transform a dream, a hallucination or fantasy into a seemingly-real event." This transformation is known as the fabrication of spurious memories and is particularly common under hypnosis.

By 1995, Hopkins had worked with hundreds of abductees. It was during these hypnosis sessions that Hopkins' belief in UFO abduction deepened. To him, the purported similarities among client stories lent credibility to the abductees' stories. In actuality, the details of abductee stories varied greatly.

The idea of repressed memories has, largely, been dismissed by the scientific community. Psychological research demonstrates that, rather than forget what has happened in a traumatic event, most people find they are unable to stop thinking about it. What concerns critics is that the details of UFO abduction stories, such as the ones Hopkins describes in his work, usually occur only after consultation with some sort of UFO investigator who already has an inclination to believe in alien abduction scenarios. UFO critic Philip J. Klass characterizes these practices as a dangerous game.

UFO abductee stories are well-documented in the psychological literature and are considered culturally based. In other parts of the world, fairies, leprechauns, and other creatures replace aliens as abductors. Some liken extraterrestrial abduction to a secular version of the religious dream. According to Baker, "These people are literally talked into believing they've been abducted."

The hypnotist can also, knowingly or unknowingly, create "memories" of an event that never occurred in their patients. In May 1987, psychologist and hypnotist Martin Reiser appeared on ABC's 20/20 with host Lynn Sherr, an episode that also featured Hopkins and alleged UFO abductees, asserting that there are reasonable explanations for UFO sightings. His belief was that Hopkins pressured his subjects into believing UFOs exist.

Elizabeth Loftus, on NOVA's Kidnapped by UFOs?, which aired on April 1, 1997 and included a taped hypnosis session conducted by Hopkins, identified "subtle but powerful suggestive cues" as Hopkins worked with two children as part of the investigative portion of the show. She cautioned that someone convinced of a false memory, can react emotionally to it and elaborate on the story as if it were real. Social psychologist Richard Ofshe concurred that suggestive influence may be a factor in Hopkins' support groups.

Of Hopkins' book, Intruders, Bettyann Kevles of The New York Times wrote, "I am willing to believe that he believes everything he has written. I am also willing to believe that Kathie and the others experienced inexplicable time losses and strange dreams that may have not been dreams. But I am wary of the accuracy of the information he gathered through hypnosis. This kind of testimony is disallowed in most courts because hypnosis is not thoroughly understood and has proved unreliable as a source of evidence. Witnesses recall events that never occurred, but that they are later, on being brought out of hypnosis, convinced really happened."

Hopkins responded to critics by saying, "I have often frequently invited interested therapists, journalists and academics to observe hypnosis sessions. Theoretical psychologist Nicholas Humphrey, who has held teaching positions at both Oxford and Cambridge Universities, and psychiatrist Donald F. Klein, director of research at the New York State Psychiatric Institute and professor of psychiatry at the College of Physicians and Surgeons, Columbia University, are but two of those who have observed my work firsthand. None of these visitors ... have reported anything that suggested I was attempting to lead the subjects."

==== Evidence ====
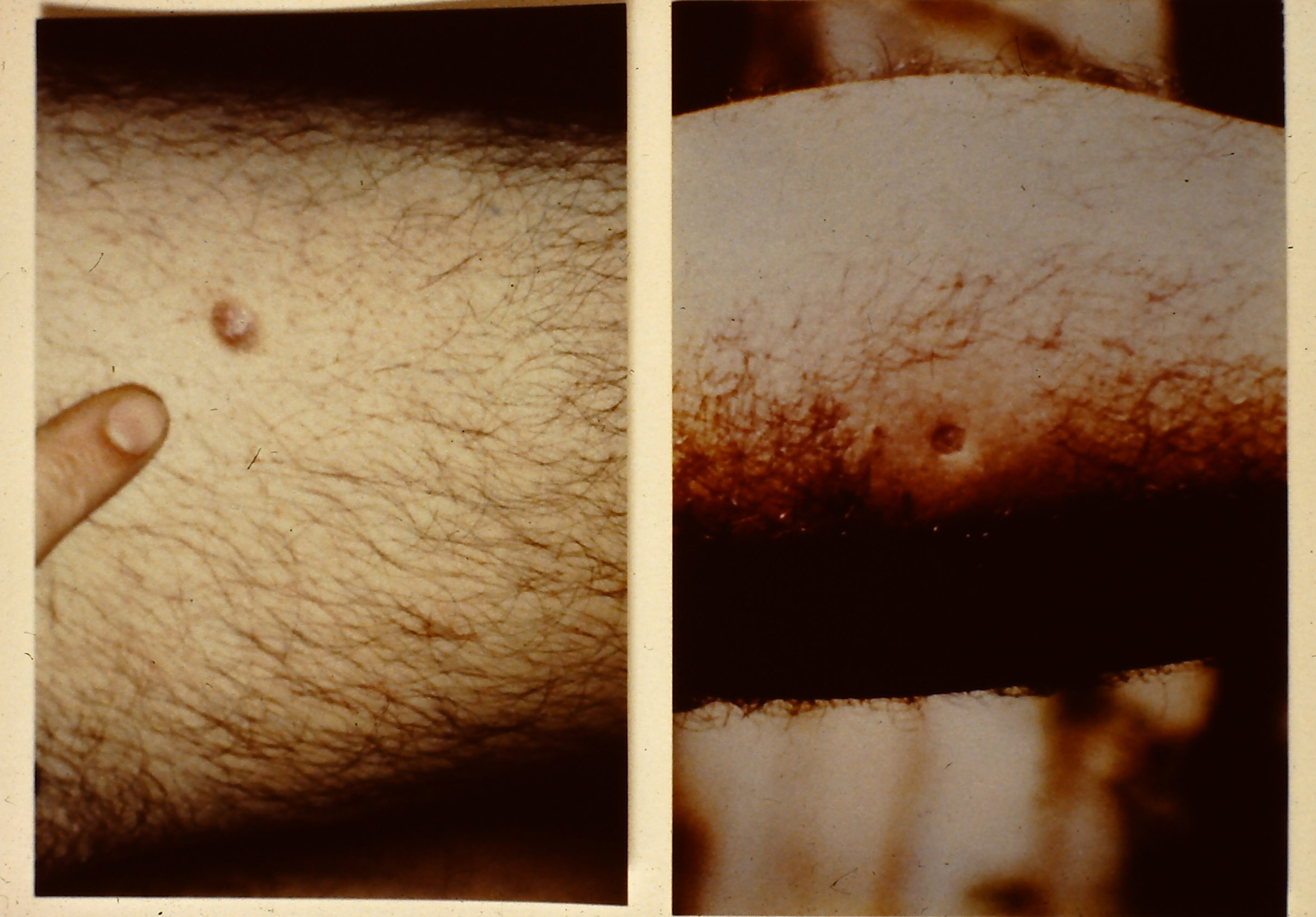
Scars from different "abductees"

Physical proof of alien abduction for Hopkins, came in the form of scoop marks, or indentations of the skin, scars or cuts on the mouth, nose, ears or genital, or unexplained bruises that might clear up in a day, and abductee claims of implants interpreted as control or monitoring devices similar to those used by (human) scientists to track and tag animals in the wild. He also believed the alien spacecraft left marks on the ground where they landed and that the aliens could be photographed.

Hopkins points to "tightly imagined testimonies" by abductees, included victims' stories of observing unconventional objects in the sky, in which they witnessed unusual activity (such as aliens digging for soil samples), flying through the air or being transported to a ship, a sense of being watched or the presence of hooded beings near the bed at night, a sense of paralysis or immobilization while lying in bed or in their cars, impressions of flying or passing through closed windows or walls, a feeling of having been outside upon awakening, invisibility (both alien and human) and, most especially, a sense of missing or lost time.

Hopkins believed in his data collection techniques, as outlined in Missing Time, and insisted, despite questions from other researchers and skeptics, that his findings were solidly based in evidence that, cumulatively, was overwhelming. Despite Hopkins' oft-repeated assertion of "powerful evidence" for alien abduction, critics plagued his career with calls for tangible proof, which were never forthcoming: DNA from the hybrid babies, proof of implants that were alluded to (particularly in the case of alleged abductee Linda Cortile) but never recovered, photographs or videotapes of space craft or aliens. Critics, including his former wife, Rainey, expressed concern that UFO researcher leaders were not held to scholastic, scientific, or ethical standards.

Still others question whether it would be likely that alien abductors could actually float people through solid walls and, if they could, wonder at how these people could escape detection, particularly in urban settings where there would, potentially, be millions of people around to witness the event. Hopkins' response to the lack of UFO sightings by bystanders was to suggest that aliens could make themselves and their abductees invisible.

The lack of physical evidence and the inconsistencies and implausibility of the alien abduction stories led some critics, including Carl Sagan and author Jodi Dean, to question whether these memories are the product of internal, rather than external experiences.

== Criticism ==
Critics of Hopkins' position that on alien abduction accounts had "an absolute core of reality" cautioned that media coverage might, inadvertently, be influencing alleged victims' stories. For example, The UFO Incident, a movie based on the Barney and Betty Hill case, aired on October 20, 1975, and exposed millions of viewers to the idea of alien abduction. Just one month later, O'Barski, Hopkins' neighbor and a New York City liquor store owner, approached him about seeing a spacecraft that, allegedly, landed in New Jersey's North Hudson Park.

Conspiracy theories of government coverup of UFO sightings and visitations, such as the ones depicted in Nighteyes and Witnessed fueled the imaginations of those who belonged to UFO groups at the time. Some say the public's interest in UFOs may have faded after the Cold War had it not been for the media's depiction of and public sympathy for traumatized alien abductee television portrayals in the 1980s and 1990s.

Even Hopkins admitted that media attention had a way of "contaminating the pool" of subjects, but believed that he was able to cull the delusional stories from those he believed to be real. In his view, the repetition of certain experiences by abductees lent credibility to their stories, leading him to conclude that these accounts were not fantasy.

== Personal life and death ==
By 1973, Hopkins was married to art critic, art historian, and curator April Kingsley, with whom he had a daughter, Grace Hopkins Their marriage ended in divorce in 1991.

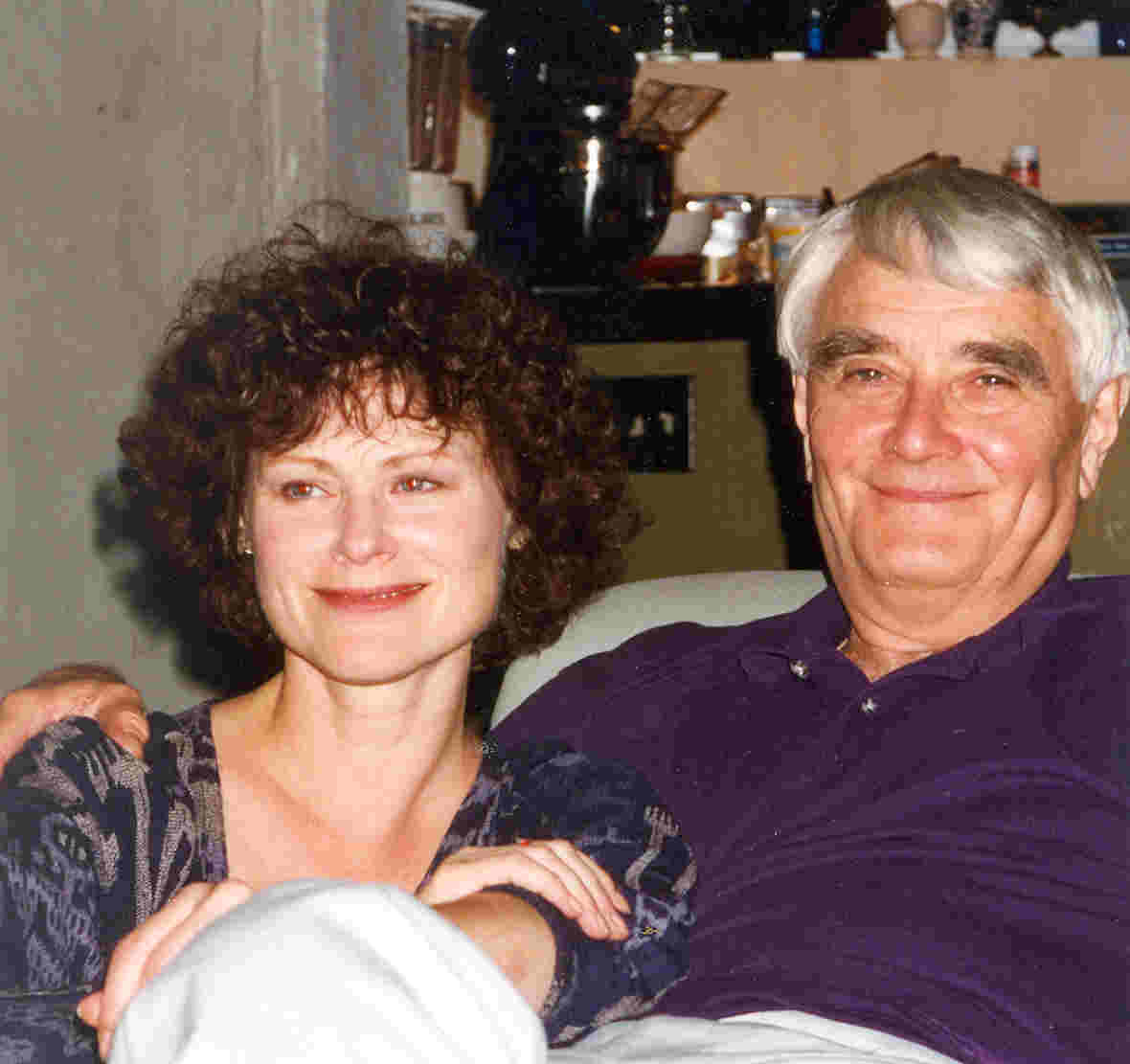
Budd Hopkins with former wife and co-author, Carol Rainey in 1996

In 1994, Hopkins met writer, filmmaker Carol Rainey, who became his third wife in 1996. They shared a mutual fascination with alien abduction stories and, according to Rainey, the possibility that people on Earth may have been "seeded here by highly advanced beings or a Big Being from 'out there'." The two co-wrote a book Sight Unseen, Science, UFO Invisibility and Transgenic Beings, which was published in 2003. They were married for 10 years.

On August 21, 2011, Hopkins died from complications of cancer. At the time of his death, he was in a relationship with journalist Leslie Kean.

== Books ==
- Art, Life and UFOs: A Memoir (2009) ISBN 978-1933665412
- Sight Unseen: Science, UFO Invisibility, and Transgenic Beings (2003), with Carol Rainey ISBN 978-0743412186
- Witnessed: The True Story of the Brooklyn Bridge UFO Abductions (1996) ISBN 978-0671569150
- Intruders: The Incredible Visitations at Copley Woods (1987) ISBN 978-0394560762
- Sacred Spaces: The Book of Temples/The Book of Guardians/The Book of Altars (1983)
- Missing Time: A Documented Study of UFO Abductions (1981) ISBN 978-0399901027

== See also ==
- David M. Jacobs
- Extraterrestrial life
- Extraterrestrials in fiction
- John E. Mack
- List of alleged extraterrestrial beings
- Grey alien
- Zeta Reticuli
- The Manhattan Alien Abduction
