= The Trauma Myth =

2009 book

The Trauma Myth: The Truth About the Sexual Abuse of Children – and Its Aftermath
- Author: Susan A. Clancy
- Language: English
- Publisher: Basic Books
- Publication date: 2009
- Publication place: United States
- ISBN: 978-0-465-02088-1

The Trauma Myth: The Truth About the Sexual Abuse of Children – and Its Aftermath is a psychology book by Susan A. Clancy, published by Basic Books.

== Content ==
In the book, Clancy states that sexual acts between adults and minors most often do not result in any traumatic reaction. The findings of the book is based on Clancy's ten years experience of interviewing people who had gone through such experiences, as well as on academic literature dating back to the early 20th century. She also discusses some specific accounts from her interviews in the book.

According to her research, many people who have had sexual experiences with adults when they were children did not have any traumatic reaction at the time of the event, but instead developed feelings of shame and regret much later due to having allowed it to occur.

Because the predominant cultural view is that such activities are inherently traumatizing, many of such people feel that they do not fit into the category of what society describes as sexually abused children, which in turn makes them feel that there is something wrong with them.

The book briefly criticizes the topic of "recovered memories", a debunked pseudoscientific concept.

== Reception ==
A review by American physician Abigail Zuger on the New York Times stated that "Clancy writes with the precision and patient repetition of a good teacher on complicated terrain." She stated that "the moral of Dr. Clancy’s story is clear: science should represent truth, not wishful thinking".

A review by Canadian psychologist Susan Pinker on The Globe and Mail described Clancy's empirical examination of sexual abuse as "well-written". She stated that Clancy's recommendation of shifting "our concept of abuse from the violent rape model to something more varied and subtle if we want to succeed at treatment and prevention" was "an unassailable goal".

A review on the Archives of Sexual behavior stated that Clancy's findings are corroborated by previous research conducted as early as the 1960s.

A review by Elizabeth F. Loftus and Steven J. Frenda published on Science stated that "No matter how strongly a theory has been embedded in the cultural zeitgeist (as the trauma model certainly has), we should always be prepared to discard it on the basis of persuasive evidence. Such behavior is a hallmark of good science [...]. Clancy says the trauma model has to go. We would not completely do away with it, but we do agree the model must be discarded in the cases of many victims to whom it does not apply. Clancy approaches child abuse with sensitivity, empathy, and thoughtfulness."

The book was subject of angry reviews, which misinterpreted her research, on websites such as Amazon. Clancy was subjected to harassment and hate mails. As a result, she moved to Nicaragua.
