= Alien Mysteries =

Canadian docuseries about alien abductions

Alien Mysteries is a Canadian UFO documentary series featuring eyewitness testimony that is produced by Exploration Production Inc. for Discovery Channel (Canada). Alien Mysteries showcases the real-life stories of ordinary people who claim to have fallen victim to alien abduction or attack. Alien Mysteries debuted on Discovery Canada on 3 March 2013.

The docudrama has six episodes that each run for one hour.

== United States pickup ==
In March 2013, Destination America, which is Discovery Channel Canada's sister network in the United States, purchased the distribution rights. Alien Mysteries made its debut in the United States in April 2013.

== Episodes ==
Alien Mysteries has six episodes:

No.	Title	Air date	Topic
1	The Reed Family	3 March 2013	Alien abduction
2	Lights Over Stephenville	3 March 2013	Stephenville, Texas UFO sightings
3	Corina Saebels	10 March 2013	Alien abduction
4	Rendlesham Forest	10 March 2013	Rendlesham Forest incident
5	Bucks County	17 March 2013	2008 Bucks County UFO sightings
6	Kecksburg UFO	17 March 2013	Kecksburg UFO incident

== Reception ==
In a positive review, Vinay Menon of the Toronto Star wrote, "Unlike a number of past alien series, which have traditionally suffered from low budgets and high levels of hokey special effects, the CGI and green screen wizardry of Toronto-based Acme Digital Pictures is both sophisticated and restrained."

== See also ==
- The Manhattan Alien Abduction – Documentary
