= The Manhattan Alien Abduction =

Documentary

- Genre: Docuseries
- Directed by: Vivienne Perry; Daniel Vernon
- No. of episodes: 3

Production
- Editor: Adam Finch

Original release
- Network: Netflix
- Release: 30 October 2024

The Manhattan Alien Abduction is a three-episode Netflix documentary miniseries about an alien abduction case from 1989. It was released in the United States on 30 October 2024. The three-part series describes Linda Napolitano's claim to have been repeatedly beamed into a spaceship from her bedroom and includes commentary from her supporters as well as her detractors. This story generated new media attention in 2024 because Napolitano and some supporters sued Netflix for defamation.

== Synopsis ==
Linda Napolitano alleges that on 30 November 1989, aliens abducted her from her Manhattan apartment. She claimed that aliens extracted her from her 12th-floor window "on a blue beam of light, lifting her onto a reddish-orange spacecraft that quickly sped off toward the Brooklyn Bridge." More than twenty unidentified witnesses and two bodyguards of an unnamed "world leader" were alleged to have witnessed the event. In 2024, Napolitano sued Netflix for defamation and misrepresentation about how the material would be presented. Her suit is joined by the estate of Budd Hopkins, the author of a book about her alleged experiences.

The series covers Hopkins' promotion of her case through a book supporting her claim, Witness: The True Story of the Brooklyn Bridge Abduction. This publication helped lend her story considerable notoriety and resulted in several media appearances, as the author claimed to have identified and interviewed over twenty witnesses, which included an unidentified foreign dignitary and his two bodyguards. The pseudonymous bodyguards say they saw her floating out of her 12th-floor apartment window to a spacecraft, a scene that was presented in the series as a reenactment. She further claims that one of the bodyguards, identified in the series as "Dan", kidnapped her, claimed he loved her, and made her show him her toes to confirm that she was not an alien.

== Responses ==
In the three-part series, the story is told chronologically from the points of view of those close to Napolitano. This includes a complex of people who support her claim, which she has always maintained is accurate, including an interview with her son and representatives for the estate of Budd Hopkins. There are also reports from individuals who initially believed the story but are now skeptical. Napolitano claims that she had a previous experience 13 years earlier when she woke up with a nosebleed. She claims a group of small gray beings placed her on a table in a spaceship and put a strange metallic device into her nose while telling her to be quiet in some peculiar, telepathic language. Napolitano says that she first thought it had all been a dream when she awoke in bed. When she noticed a lump in her nose, she sought medical attention. Her doctor informed her that while there was nothing currently in her nose, there was a build-up of cartilage that suggested there had previously been a foreign object.

A Netflix promo says, "This docuseries explores whether it was an elaborate hoax or proof of alien life." Carol Rainey, a filmmaker who was married to Budd Hopkins from 1996 until 2006, initially believed Napolitano's account. A friendship formed between the two, but as time progressed, Rainey started to become skeptical and also wondered whether Hopkins had lost his objectivity. She became a major critic. The Decider summarized their impressions in this way, "Despite all the archival footage and dark-toned reenactments that set the scene for The Manhattan Alien Abduction, the docuseries is essentially two now-senior citizens litigating a decades-old beef via the camera they're talking into and the producer that's asking them questions." They also complain that the reenactments in the series are "a little over the top."

The October 2024 lawsuit, filed by Napolitano and the estate of Budd Hopkins, seeks damages for six claims, including fraud, defamation, and breach of good faith. Part of Napolitano's lawsuit concerns the use of footage of interviews with Rainey in the documentary, which Napolitano claims Netflix told her would not be extensively used. Napolitano argues that Netflix portrayed her as a "fabulist" and that she was "smeared as a liar by a late ufologist's scorned ex-wife."

== See also ==
- Alien Mysteries – Canadian docuseries about alien abductions
