= April Kingsley =

American art critic and curator (1941–2023)

- Born: February 16, 1941; New York City, US
- Died: June 13, 2023 (aged 82); Wellfleet, Massachusetts, US
- Known for: Art critic, museum curator
- Spouses: Walter McMenamin; Max Schubel; Budd Hopkins (1973–91); Donald Spyke (2005-20)
- Children: 1
- Website: aprilkingsley.com

April Kingsley (February 16, 1941 – June 13, 2023) was an American art critic and curator known for her support of abstract expressionism in New York City, her work on the catalogue raisonné of Franz Kline, and her book about the rise of abstract expressionism, The Turning Point. In addition to her work as an art critic, art historian, and author, Kingsley was an educator and a curator especially of figurative- and abstract-expressionist work.

== Early life ==
Kingsley was born on February 16, 1941, in Queens, New York City to Kingdon Edward Kingsley and Grace Helene Consilia Haddock. She grew up in Queens' Whitestone neighborhood, and Winthrop, Maine.

Kingsley graduated from Flushing High School in 1958. Beginning in 1960, she attended Queens College School of Nursing, after which she worked as a nurse in Manhattan for a short time. Later, she attended New York University, where she studied with H. W. Janson, and earned her Master of Fine Arts from the Institute of Fine Arts in 1966. Kingsley eventually earned a PhD in art history at the Graduate Center of the City University of New York.

== Career ==
Kingsley worked as a nurse for a brief time but devoted her career to supporting the abstract expressionism movement in New York, curating influential exhibitions, and writing extensively on abstract expressionism, figurative expressionism, and the movements’ notable artists. She was a curator at The Museum of Modern Art and The American Craft Museum in New York City, the Pasadena Art Museum, and the Kresge Art Museum in East Lansing, Michigan. She curated several exhibitions in and around New York. During the 1970s, she wrote numerous articles, reviews, and criticism for Artforum, Art in America, Art International, Art News, Newsweek, The Soho Weekly News, and The Village Voice, as well as profiles and catalogues for artists and galleries.

Kingsley contributed to the catalogs of more than 75 artists and wrote major monographs on several artists, including Jean Miotte and Alice Dalton Bown. In 1989, her essay "Abstract Expressionism in Context" was included in the book Three Hundred Years of American Paintings from the Montclair Art Museum Collection. In 1992, she published her first book, titled The Turning Point. In 2013, she published Emotional Impact, which discussed her involvement with the traveling exhibitions hosted by the Western Association of Art Museums during the 1970s.

== Influence ==
Her book, The Turning Point: The Abstract Expressionists and the Transformation of American Art, 1992, was a month-by-month study of the developments in New York in 1950 when nearly all the key artists were in New York and becoming aware of their burgeoning influence on the new abstract expressionism movement.

In addition to her early support for the abstract- and figurative-expressionism movements, Kingsley launched a major traveling exhibition called “Afro-American Abstraction” which turned the spotlight on a number of African-American artists including Jack Whitten, Melvin Edwards, and Edward Clark, among others. Her writing on African-American art was cited by fellow critics and featured in Soul of a Nation: Art in the Age of Black Power, the book accompanying the exhibition at the Tate Modern. Her presence in and influence on the art worlds in New York City and Cape Cod, Massachusetts, impacted the careers and legacies of many notable artists, such as Mary Shaffer, Sandy Skoglund, Franz Kline, Mark Rothko, Willem de Kooning, Adolph Gottlieb, Michael Loew, Arturo Alonzo Sandoval, and Boaz Vaadia.

The artist Pat Lasch referred to Kingsley as "a visionary" who "promoted artists of color and women when no one would touch them," and James Little cited her impact as having "helped change the course and conversation forever."

Kingsley's papers from the 1960s until 2017 are stored at the Archives of American Art research centre within the Smithsonian Institution.

== Personal life ==
Kingsley resided most of her adult life in New York City and Cape Cod.

Kingsley's first marriage was to Walter McMenamin in 1961, though the couple later divorced. She was briefly married to composer Max Schubel. In 1973, she married painter and author Budd Hopkins. The marriage produced Kingsley's only child, the artist Grace Hopkins. Kingsley and Hopkins divorced in 1991. She later married Donald Spyke, who died in 2020.

Kingsley died from Alzheimer's disease in Wellfleet, Massachusetts, on June 13, 2023, at the age of 82.

== Publications ==
- Afro-American Abstraction (1982)
- "Abstract Expressionism in Context," in Three Hundred Years of American Paintings: The Montclair Art Museum Collection (1989)
- The Turning Point: The Abstract Expressionists and the Transformation of American Art (1992)
- The Paintings of Alice Dalton Brown (2002)
- Suitcase Paintings: Small Scale Abstract Expressionism, co-written with John Corbett, Jim Dempsey, and Thomas McCormick (2007)
- Emotional Impact: American Figurative Expressionism (2013)
- The Soul of a Nation Reader: Writings By and About Black American Artists, 1960-1980
