= Whispers: The Voices of Paranoia =

1994 book by Ronald K. Siegel

- Title page for Whispers: The Voices of Paranoia (1994)
- Author: Ronald K. Siegel
- Language: English
- Subject: Paranoia
- Publication date: 1994
- Pages: 310
- ISBN: 9780517592397

Whispers: The Voices of Paranoia is a narrative by Ronald K. Siegel. First published in 1994, it is a narrative about the extremes of phobias called paranoia.

== Summary ==
This narrative is a collection of stories of different people suffering with paranoia that Siegel himself has studied closely. All of the stories include a "paranoid" who has a common phobia, like dental fear, that has uncontrollably spiraled to the point of extreme fear. Siegel spent time with these paranoids, talking to them, getting to know them, in order to find the root of their paranoid state. Below are some examples of Siegel's patients.

=== Interview with Hitler's Brain ===
This chapter starts with a rumor that University of California, Los Angeles is holding Adolf Hitler's brain in their basement and keeping it alive. Siegel goes on to explain to the reader that Hitler is one of the most famous paranoids in the world. Hitler was convinced that the Jewish population was plotting against his fatherland, Germany, and against humankind in general. In order to find out more about this rumor, and about Hitler's paranoia, Siegel decides to do some research that leads him to the basement, speaking to "Hitler" on a computer program run by a graduate student named Mike Steiner.

=== Dr. Tolman's Flying Influence Machine ===
Eddie Tolman is the star of this chapter. Being a super genius, Tolman moved on to do great things. His paranoia, however, was holding him from having an overall successful life. He was paranoid that a satellite called POSSE was trying to take him over, because he would see images and hear a clicking noise while he would try to sleep. After studying Tolman, Siegel can't seem to help him until he speaks to his wife. Mrs. Tolman explains Dr. Tolman's obsession with the film El Topo, and the fact that he grinds his teeth at night. Siegel concludes that Tolman's paranoia of a satellite is actually stemmed from the film. The images are just pieces of the film playing in his mind, scaring him, and the clicking noises are just him grinding his teeth in his sleep. Siegel tries to expose this to Dr. Tolman, but the paranoia has taken over so much that Tolman won't listen to the evidence.

=== Whispers ===
Miss Lillian is an elderly lady with a common fear of the dentist. However, her fear has spiraled into paranoia that causes her to believe that the dentist has implanted little devices into her teeth, giving her the symptom of "whispering teeth" when she visits the dentist. She keeps a collection of birds in her home so that whoever if listening through the devices cannot hear her conversations. When Siegel gets to know her, he learns that she has trouble hearing. He decides to have her hearing checked, and when she comes back with a hearing aid, he decides it is time for her to face her fear. When she visits the dentist and is put under the nitrous oxide, she no longer hears the whispers. The paranoia mixed with bad hearing and nitrous oxide was the cause of the alleged "whispers", and by exposing that, Siegel was able to help Miss Lillian return to a normal life.

There are thirteen chapters of these stories, each about a different person with a different story of their journey with paranoia and Siegel.

== Allusions ==
Siegel includes a lot of allusions in the narrative in order to truly describe the feelings of not only his subjects, but the feelings of he himself as well. For example, he speaks a lot of composers like Vivaldi and his music in order to discuss his state of mind during his time with his patients.

== Writing style ==
The narrative is written through the viewpoint of Siegel himself, in order to outline his own journey of paranoia through the patients that he has studied.

== Reception ==
- "A well-crafted tapestry...horrifying and utterly fascinating. Whispers is a hard book to put down."-Betty Ann Kevles, Los Angeles Times
- "Siegel is a skilled writer who effectively takes us into the paranoid world of each individual...Reading Whispers is like reading about an exotic and dangerous travel adventure."-David Neubauer, The Washington Post

The book overall got good feedback. Readers have reviewed that the narrative taught them a lot, and is described as a "page turner".

== Whispers and narrative medicine ==
Siegel's narrative is a perfect example of the genre of narrative medicine. Siegel demonstrates the importance of getting to know a patient's life, history and loved ones before setting a diagnosis. The reader can see clearly that without having knowledge of the patient, Siegel could not have been able to help the people he has written about at all.

== Bibliography ==
- http://www.goodreads.com/book/show/136993.WHISPERS - Reader reviews on Whispers
