= David M. Jacobs =

American historian and ufologist

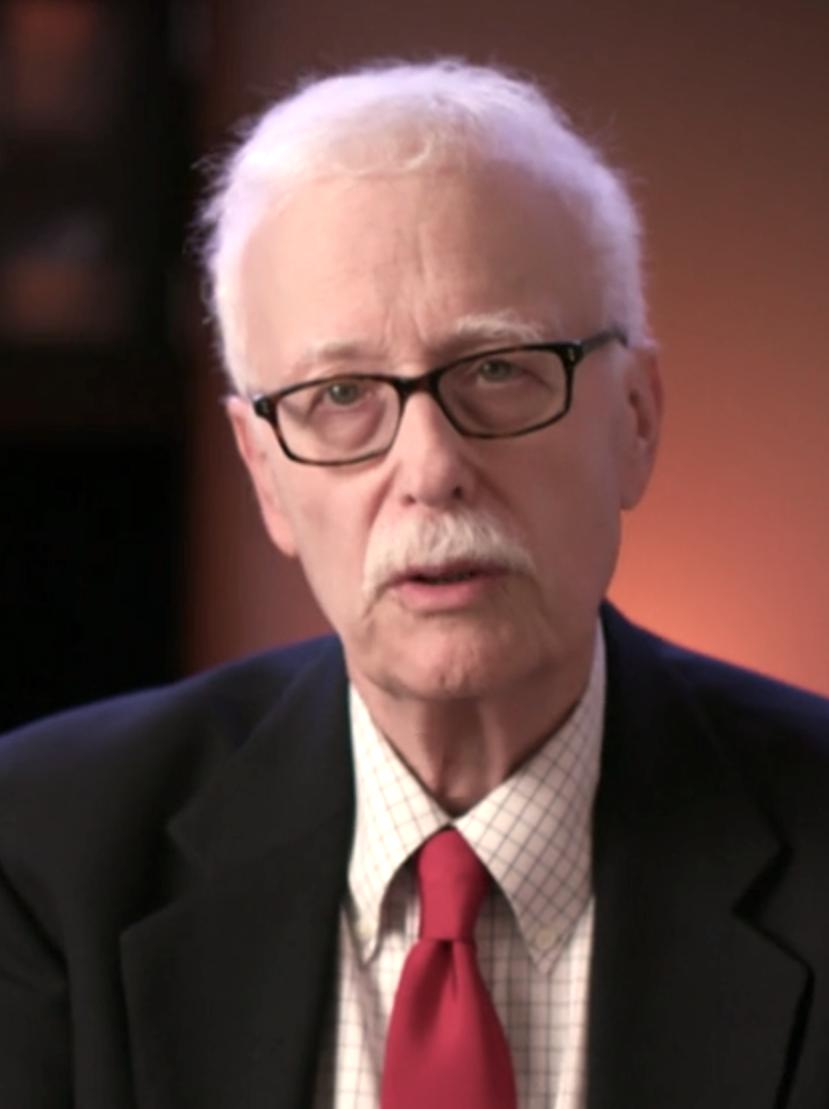
- Born: August 10, 1942 (age 84)

Academic background
- Education: UCLA; University of Wisconsin–Madison
- Thesis: The controversy over unidentified flying objects in America: 1896 - 1973 (1973)

Academic work
- Discipline: American history Ufology
- Institutions: Temple University
- Website: www.davidmichaeljacobs.com (revised version) (archived version)

David Michael Jacobs (born August 10, 1942) is an American historian and retired Associate Professor of History at Temple University specializing in 20th-century American history. Jacobs is a prominent figure in ufology and the study of the alien abduction phenomenon, including the use of hypnosis on subjects claiming to be abductees. Jacobs has authored several books on the subject.

== Career ==
Jacobs studied at University of California, Los Angeles and obtained his Ph.D. from the University of Wisconsin–Madison in 1973, in the field of intellectual history. He wrote his dissertation on the controversy over unidentified flying objects in America. A revised edition of his dissertation was published as The UFO Controversy in America by Indiana University Press in 1975.

As a faculty member of the Department of History at Temple University, Jacobs specialized in history of 20th-century American popular culture. He stated that his current research interests "involve a delineation of the role of anomalous experiences in personal and cultural life." For over 25 years Jacobs taught a course on "UFOs in American Society."

=== Ufology ===
Jacobs has a high profile in the field of ufology. He has lectured widely, been interviewed, and participated in numerous television and radio shows on the subject of alien abductions.

Jacobs has written five books on the topic of UFOs and alleged alien abductions. In recent years, Jacobs has publicly argued that the evidence from his research, which sometimes includes utilizing hypnotic regression with alleged alien abductees along with traditional interview techniques, purports that alien-human hybrids were engaged in a covert program of infiltration into human society with possibly the final goal of taking over Earth. He asserts that some of his research subjects are teaching these hybrids how to blend into human society so that they cannot be differentiated from humans, and that this is occurring worldwide.

== Criticism ==
Jacobs' hypotheses have been criticized as unsupportably dire by those who take a more positive view of the alien abduction experience such as John E. Mack; Jacobs labels these critics as "positivists" in his writings. Details of alien abductions reported by Jacobs and so-called "positivist" researchers may not differ to any great extent; criticism of Jacobs by such peers therefore focuses on Jacobs' interpretations, e.g., where Jacobs sees "infiltration" (a negative), others may see "integration" (a positive). Where differences in reports are more substantial (extending beyond the interpretive to actual distinctions between the alleged events reported by those who Jacobs interviews versus those interviewed by others), Jacobs has explained that elements not matching his own perspective are what he terms "confabulations."

Carl Sagan, Susan Clancy, Martin Gardner and George have criticized the methods used by Jacobs and other abduction researchers. Sagan asserted that sightings and experiences could be attributed to mistaken identity and faulty memory. Clancy has highlighted problems associated with abduction research, such as faulty memory retrieval when hypnotists "lead" the patient, and a failure to consider sleep paralysis as an explanation. Gardner explains: "Although Jacobs has had no training in psychology, psychiatry, or hypnotherapy, he uses hypnotism to induce his patients (now more than seven hundred) to develop strong memories of horrendous abductions even though many patients had no such memories until hypnotized (Though many abductees have claimed to remember bits and pieces of the abduction experience without the implementation of hypnotherapy). Jacobs is convinced that five million Americans have been kidnapped at least once by aliens. One female patient, who worked in retail sales, had, according to Jacobs, one hundred abductions in one year, an average of one every three days!"

Jacobs has argued that Clancy's methodology was flawed, stating that in numerous cases people report they were abducted when fully awake and conscious, and that therefore sleep paralysis is not a tenable hypothesis. Moreover, he has stated that her book was factually incorrect.

== Written works ==
- Jacobs, David Michael (1975). The UFO Controversy in America. Foreword by J. Allen Hynek. Bloomington, Indiana: Indiana University Press. ISBN 0-253-19006-1. LCCN 74011886. OCLC 1120938.
- Jacobs, David M. (1992). Secret Life: Firsthand Accounts of UFO Abductions. Foreword by John E. Mack. New York: Simon & Schuster. ISBN 0-671-74857-2. LCCN 91045662. OCLC 25130658.
- —— (1998). The Threat. The Secret Alien Agenda: What the Aliens Really Want ... And How They Plan to Get It. New York: Simon & Schuster. ISBN 0-684-81484-6. LCCN 97027040. OCLC 37315300.
- Jacobs, David M., ed. (2000). 'UFOs and Abductions: Challenging the Borders of Knowledge. Lawrence, Kansas: University Press of Kansas. ISBN 0-7006-1032-4. LCCN 00028970. OCLC 43615835.
- Jacobs, David M. (2015). Walking Among Us: The Alien Plan to Control Humanity. San Francisco, California: Disinformation Books. ISBN 978-1-9388-7514-4.

=== Translation ===
- Secret Life: Firsthand Accounts of UFO Abductions (1992) was translated into French under the title Les kidnappeurs d'un autre monde, présenté par Jimmy Guieu (literally: Kidnappers From Another World), 1995, Paris, Presses de la Cité. ISBN 978-2258038721.

== See also ==
- Extraterrestrial life
- List of Ig Nobel Prize winners
