= Antônio Vilas-Boas =

Brazilian man who claimed extraterrestrial abduction

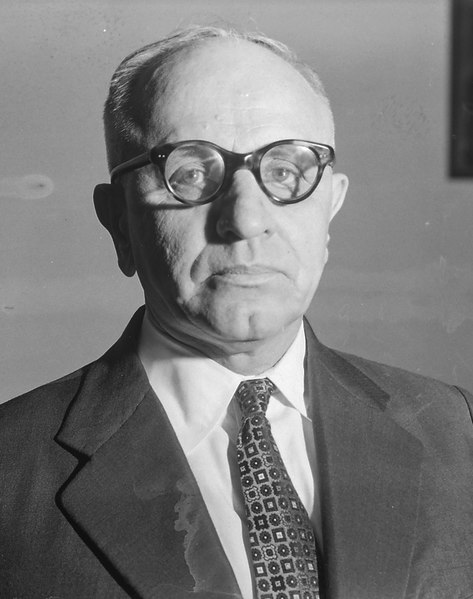
- Born: 7 May 1934; Brazil
- Died: 17 January 1991 (aged 56)
- Known for: Alleged abduction

Alleged abduction of Antônio Vilas-Boas
- Status: Single abductee
- First abduction date: 16 October 1957
- Location: São Francisco de Sales, Brazil
- Taken from: Open fields

Antônio Vilas-Boas (Note: Most often spelled "Villas Boas" or "Villas-Boas", especially in English sources.) (1934–1991) was a Brazilian farmer (later a lawyer) who claimed to have been abducted by extraterrestrials in 1957. Though similar stories had circulated for years beforehand, Vilas-Boas's claims were among the first alien abduction stories to receive widespread attention. Some skeptics have suggested the abduction story is a hoax, although Boas reportedly maintained his account throughout his life.

== Early life ==
Antônio Vilas-Boas was the son of Jerônimo Pedro Vilas-Boas (1887–1963) and Enésia Cândida de Oliveira (1897–1963), and was born in São Francisco de Sales.

== Vilas-Boas's story ==
The existence of Vilas-Boas's testimony was made possible by Olavo Fontes, a doctor who performed a detailed interview and medical review in 1958.

At the time of his alleged abduction, Antônio Vilas-Boas was a 23-year-old Brazilian farmer who was working at night to avoid the hot temperatures of the day. On 15 October 1957, he was ploughing fields near São Francisco de Sales when he saw what he described as a "red star" in the night sky. According to his story, this "star" approached his position, growing in size until it became recognizable as a roughly circular or egg-shaped aerial craft, with a red light at its front and a rotating cupola on top. The craft began descending to land in the field, extending three "legs" as it did so. At that point, Boas decided to run from the scene.

According to Boas, he first attempted to leave the area on his tractor, but when its lights and engine died after traveling only a short distance, he decided to continue on foot. However, he was seized by a 5-foot-tall (150 cm) humanoid wearing grey coveralls and a helmet, whose eyes were described as small and blue. The being reportedly produced vocalizations like barks or yelps instead of recognizable speech. Three similar beings then joined the first in subduing Boas, and they dragged him inside their craft.

Location of São Francisco de Sales, Minas Gerais, Brazil

Once inside the ship, Boas said that he was stripped of his clothes and covered from head to toe with a strange gel. He was then led through a doorway that had strange red symbols written over it into a large semicircular room. (Boas claimed that he was able to memorize these symbols and later reproduced them for investigators.) In this room, the beings took samples of Boas's blood from his chin. He was subsequently taken to a third room and left alone for around half an hour. During this time, an unknown type of gas was reportedly pumped into the room, which caused Boas to become violently ill.

Shortly following the incident with the gas, Boas claimed that he was joined in the room by another humanoid. This one, however, was female, very attractive, and naked. She was the same height as the other beings he had encountered, with a small, pointed chin and large, blue catlike eyes. The hair on her head was long and white (somewhat similar to a platinum blonde color) but her underarm and pubic hair were bright red. Boas said he was strongly attracted to the woman, and the two had sexual intercourse. During this act, Boas noted that the female did not kiss him but instead nipped him on the chin.

When this part of the abduction was over, the female smiled at Boas, rubbing her abdomen and gesturing upwards. Boas initially was afraid this meant she was going to return and take him, but Fontes later posited that the gesture indicated she would raise their child in space. The female seemed relieved that their "task" was over, and Boas himself said that he felt angered by the situation, perceiving that he had been little more than "a good stallion" for the humanoids.

Boas stated that his clothing was returned to him and that he was taken on a tour of the ship by the beings. During this tour, he said that he attempted to take a clocklike device as proof of the encounter, but was caught by the humanoids and prevented from doing so. He was then escorted outside and looked on as the ship departed, glowing brightly as it left. When Boas returned home, he discovered that four hours had passed.

Boas later became a lawyer, married, and had four children. He maintained the story of his alleged abduction throughout his entire life. Although some sources say he died in 1992, he died on 17 January 1991.

== Investigation ==
Following this alleged event, Boas claimed to have suffered from nausea, weakness, headaches, and lesions on his skin that appeared without any kind of light bruising. Eventually, he contacted journalist João Martins, who had placed an ad in a newspaper looking for people claiming to have had experiences with UFOs. Upon hearing Boas's story, Martins contacted Olavo Fontes of the National School of Medicine in Brazil; Fontes was also in contact with the American UFO research group APRO. Fontes examined the farmer and concluded that he had been exposed to a large dose of radiation and was now suffering from mild radiation sickness. Writer Terry Melanson states:

Among [Vilas-Boas's] symptoms were 'pains throughout the body, nausea, headaches, loss of appetite, ceaselessly burning sensations in the eyes, cutaneous lesions at the slightest of light bruising ... which went on appearing for months, looking like small reddish nodules, harder than the skin around them and protuberant, painful when touched, each with a small central orifice yielding a yellowish thin waterish discharge.' The skin surrounding the wounds presented 'a hyperchromatic violet-tinged area.'

According to researcher Peter Rogerson, the story first came to light in February 1958, and the earliest definite print reference to Boas's story was from the April–June 1962 issue of the Brazilian UFO periodical SBESDV Bulletin. Rogerson asserts that the story had definitely circulated between 1958 and 1962, further noting that it was probably recorded in print, although details are uncertain.

Vilas-Boas was reportedly able to recall every detail of his purported experience, and hypnotic regression was not used. Further, the encounter occurred in 1957, which was still several years before the Hill incident made the concept of alien abductions famous and helped spur the reporting of similar alleged experiences.

Researcher Peter Rogerson, however, doubts the veracity of Vilas-Boas's story. He notes that several months before Vilas-Boas first related his claims, a similar story had been printed in the November 1957 issue of the periodical O Cruzeiro, and suggests that Vilas-Boas borrowed details of this earlier account, along with elements of the contactee stories of George Adamski. Rogerson also argues:

One reason why the [Vilas-Boas] story gained credibility was the prejudiced assumption that any farmer in the Brazilian interior had to be an illiterate peasant who 'couldn't make this up'. As Eddie Bullard pointed out to me, the fact that the Vilas-Boas family possessed a tractor put them well above the peasant class ... We now know that AVB was a determinedly upwardly mobile young man, studying a correspondence course and eventually becoming a lawyer (at which news the ufologists who had considered him too much the rural simpleton to have made the story up now argued that he was too respectable and bourgeois to have done so).

== See also ==
- Alien abduction
- Barney and Betty Hill incident
- Close Encounter of the Seventh Kind
- List of reported UFO sightings
- UFO sightings in Brazil
- Unidentified flying object
