= Ronald K. Siegel =

American psychopharmacologist (1943–2019)

- Born: January 2, 1943
- Died: March 24, 2019 (aged 76)
- Medical career
- Field: Psychopharmacology
- Institutions: University of California, Los Angeles

Ronald Keith Siegel (January 2, 1943 – March 24, 2019) was an American psychopharmacologist and associate research professor in the Department of Psychiatry and Biobehavioral Sciences at the University of California, Los Angeles. Siegel was the author of several noted studies and books on psychopharmacology, hallucination, and paranoia.

A native of Herkimer, New York, he received his B.A. in sociology from Brandeis University and his Ph.D. in psychology from Dalhousie University. He was affiliated with the Albert Einstein College of Medicine at Yeshiva University before joining the research faculty of UCLA in 1972, where he remained until his retirement in 2008. Throughout his career, he was a consultant to several government commissions on drug use. His research focused on the effects of drugs on human behavior, including numerous clinical studies in which human volunteers (sometimes referred to by Siegel as "psychonauts") took drugs such as ketamine, LSD, marijuana, mescaline, psilocybin, and THC.

In 2005, Siegel was an expert witness for the defense in the Robert Blake murder trial, testifying on the long-term effects of methamphetamine and cocaine use. According to the jury foreman in the trial, Siegel was "one of the most compelling witnesses" in discrediting the testimony of Ronald Hambleton, who claimed that Blake had asked him to murder Bonnie Lee Bakley. In the course of his testimony in the Blake trial, Siegel disclosed that in one study, he had taught monkeys to smoke crack cocaine.

He died on March 24, 2019, from complications of Alzheimer's disease. His personal book collection is now managed by INKQ Rare Books in Addison, Texas.

== Bibliography ==
- Siegel, Ronald (1975). Hallucinations: Behavior, Experience, and Theory. New York: Wiley. ISBN 978-0-471-79096-9. OCLC 1701552. (with Jolly West)
  - Siegel, Ronald K.; Jarvik, Murray E. (1975). "Drug-Induced Hallucinations in Animals and Man". In Siegel, R. K.; West, L. J. (eds.). Hallucinations: Behavior, Experience, and Theory. New York: John Wiley & Sons. pp. 81–161. ISBN 0-471-79096-6.
- Intoxication: The Universal Drive for Mind-Altering Substances (1989, 2005)
- Siegel, Ronald (1993). Fire in the brain : clinical tales of hallucination. New York, NY, U.S.A: Plume. ISBN 978-0-452-26953-8. OCLC 26503652.
- Whispers: The Voices of Paranoia (1994)
- Siegel, Ronald (2006). Lullaby for morons : based on the true story of America's first school teacher murder. Utica, N.Y: North Country Books. ISBN 978-1-59531-011-8. OCLC 71789770.
- Siegel, Ronald (2015). Hashish the Lost Legend The First English Translation of a Great Oriental Romance. City: Process. ISBN 978-1-934170-57-1. OCLC 892460011.
- Marie-Madeleine (2016). Siegel, Ronald Keith (ed.). Priestess of Morphine: The Lost Writings of Marie-Madeleine in the Time of Nazis. RKS library editions. Process Media. ISBN 978-1-934170-60-1.
