= Niche insurance =

Insurance for small, low-demand areas

Niche insurance is insurance provided for small, low-demand markets. It is outside of the usual insurance types available, such as automobile, home, life, travel, and business insurance, and can be very difficult to obtain.

A few examples are:

- Insurance for drivers with convictions, often referred to as Assigned Risk Car Insurance
- Home Owners Insurance for those owners who have previously made a large claim
- Professions which are unusual (piano tuners) or high risk (such as scaffolders)
- Temporary event insurance (fêtes, live music events)
- Body-part insurance, for people whose livelihood depends on the state of a particular part of their body, such as actors' legs or noses
- Kidnapping of key corporate executives
- Hole-in-one insurance, for country clubs or other venues hosting golf tournaments with large cash prizes for a hole-in-one, which is a type of prize indemnity insurance.
- Alien abduction – the first company to offer UFO abduction insurance was through the St. Lawrence Agency in Altamonte Springs, Florida; Reports by GEICO insurance (which does not sell alien insurance policies) and by The Daily Telegraph state that one English company has sold over 30,000 policies
- Death or disability caused by supernatural phenomena, including ghosts and poltergeists

In these circumstances, a specialist insurer is required for these niche areas. The specialist may have expert knowledge of the particular risk or can provide policies which have been tailored to fit the need. Often, approaching others with similar circumstances in internet forums, associations or competitors in the same trade can help track down these niche products.

Several celebrities and porn stars have had their penises underwritten in amounts exceeding one million dollars, including Van Halen frontman David Lee Roth, and pornographic actor Keiran Lee – both of whom had their penises underwritten by Lloyd's of London, also known for insuring other body parts including the vocal cords of Bruce Springsteen.

In 2000, three sisters from Inverness took out a £1 million insurance policy to cover the cost of bringing up the infant Jesus Christ in the event of a Second Coming and virgin birth. The company that provided this policy, Braintree, Essex-based company britishinsurance.com, withdrew the cover in June 2006, stating that Catholic groups had complained.
