= UFO sightings in China =

List of alleged UFO sightings within the nation of China

This is a list of alleged sightings of unidentified flying objects or UFOs in China.

== 1994 ==
“The Meng Zhaoguo Incident” refers to a supposed close encounter of the third kind, experienced by a man of the same name, which purportedly took place at Phoenix Mountain in Wuchang, Heilongjiang. In 1994, he reported that he and a relative had followed what he thought was a weather balloon after they saw a white, shining object descend onto Phoenix Mountain. On 7 June, a large white object landed on a farm. Two days later, when workers went to investigate, Meng was incapacitated by an intense beam of light.

After the initial encounter, Meng claimed to be suffering from ongoing harassment by the entities, and reported being taken to their spacecraft and forced to copulate. On the night of 16 July, he claimed to have been abducted from his house and shown pictures of Comet Shoemaker–Levy 9 striking Jupiter, the latter of which was ostensibly implied to be their homeworld.

His story was examined by the UFO Enthusiasts Club at Wuhan University throughout 1997. They concluded that while the initial contact may have occurred, the subsequently reported events were almost certainly untrue. However, other UFO groups in China supported his claims.

== 2010 ==
On 7 July, an unidentified flying object was spotted above Hangzhou Xiaoshan International Airport near Hangzhou, China. The airport was closed down due to the sighting. An investigation by members of both the Beijing and Shanghai UFO Research Organizations revealed no radar images. The purported images of the UFO in news media were ostensibly not related to the event or the airport, and the investigators concluded that what was witnessed may have been an aircraft, possibly military.

== See also ==
- List of reported UFO sightings
