= Soft resistance =

Hong Kong political phrase

"Soft resistance", or "soft confrontation" (Chinese: 軟對抗) (Note: simplified Chinese: 软对抗; traditional Chinese: 軟對抗; pinyin: Ruǎn duìkàng; Jyutping: Jyun5 Deoi3 Kong3) is a phrase often used by the Hong Kong and Chinese governments in the years following the imposition of the National Security Law in 2020 to describe acts that could ostensibly endanger national security. Scholars, activists, and even pro-Beijing figures have criticised the concept for being vague and without a legal definition, with some observing that the phrase has been used as a justification to create a chilling effect on matters not previously considered sensitive, such as environmental activism.

== Origin ==
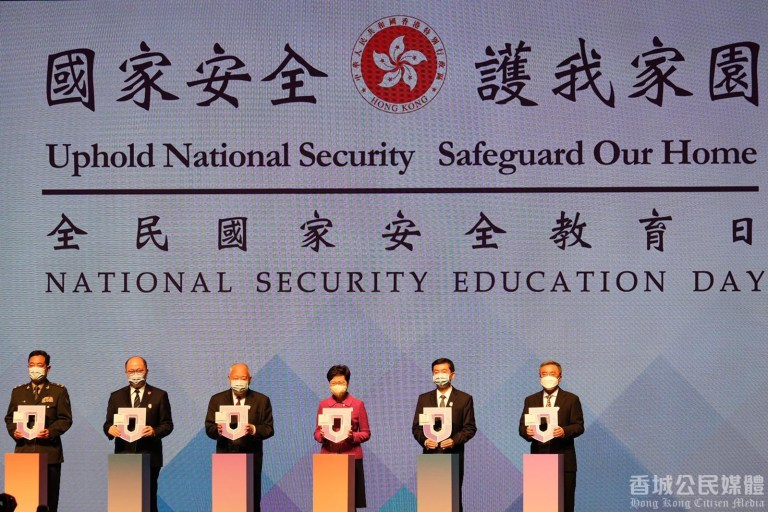
Opening ceremony of National Security Education Day in 2021 joined by Luo (second right)

The national security law imposed by China in June 2020 criminalises secession, subversion, terrorist activities, and collusion, activities that are deemed to be endangering the security of the state. In the first year over a hundred had been arrested under the new law, including dozens of prominent activists such as the 47 democrat leaders. Following the collapse of the opposition pro-democracy camp, the Hong Kong Government remained committed to safeguard and secure the national security.

In April 2021, at a ceremony to mark Hong Kong's first National Security Education Day, Luo Huining, the director of Hong Kong Liaison Office of the Beijing government, made it to enforce legislation against those that harm the security of the state, and coining the term "soft resistance" without further elaboration.

Now that we have a law, a mechanism, and a team, the implementation is ever more important… For all who endanger national security, hard resistance should be stricken down by law, soft resistance should be regulated by law.

— Luo Huining

== Definition ==
As of 2025, no formal legal definition of the term has been put forward by the government. In an interview in June 2025, Secretary for Justice Paul Lam suggested that the phrase was political, not legal, and that while acts of soft resistance might not necessarily be illegal, they would still harm society. He admitted that the concept was difficult to define, and claimed that the government would not use the label arbitrarily. In the government's first explanation of the term, Lam suggested that soft resistance consists of three elements:

1. making false or misleading statements;
2. expressing them irrationally and with emotional bias; and
3. with the intention of creating misunderstanding about the Chinese and Hong Kong governments and their policies.

The government has not defined the concept of "soft resistance" which was frequently cited by the officials as a threat to national security, although most of the officials and politicians considered it as inciting hatred against or maliciously attacking the authorities. They also reaffirmed taking a hard line against "soft resistance", believing that the opposition did not give up entirely on creating chaos in Hong Kong and "poisoning" the youths. However, the authorities stressed that criticisms against the government is allowed, as long as it is without "bad intentions".

Lau Siu-kai, a pro-China semi-official commentator, said "hard resistance" referred to the forces supporting violence and Hong Kong's independence and separatism, and "soft resistance" focused on ideological work, such as "disseminating disinformation, creating panic, maliciously attacking the SAR government and the central authorities and distorting the Basic Law". Lau added "soft resistance" belonged to "ideological realm", which caused unrest in Hong Kong in recent years. As it is difficult to be fully addressed through the law, the term could be eternally vague as it evolves according to Lau.

Chief Executive John Lee stressed in June 2025 that "soft resistance is definitely here" and real across various sectors in the society. Lee also urged for vigilance as "villains fill the streets".

["Soft resistance"] is lurking across different areas and different sectors… Some are even disguised as righteous-sounding causes, but in fact, they carry an intention to endanger national security or commit destructive "soft resistance" ... Of course, criticism of the government ... is allowed in our society, as long as you do not have bad intentions ... But we should not isolate things, because when we connect the dots, you know it could be part of a scheme of soft resistance.

— John Lee

=== Examples ===
Pro-government members labelled various activities and speeches as an act of "soft resistance". Pro-democracy or independent media outlets were said to have "manipulated" opinion and spread hatred, while teachers were claimed to have attempted to distort history. In a sedition case involving an illustrated children's book that depicted police officers as wolves, the judge ruled that the books had the effect of "brainwashing" young readers for hatred, was also cited as an instance of "soft resistance". Edwina Lau from the national security police said organisers of international sporting events could be conducting "soft resistance" after the protest anthem Glory to Hong Kong was played instead of the Chinese national anthem, March of the Volunteers. Ng Chau-pei, a lawmaker and leader of the leftist Federation of Trade Unions, said inciting others to cast blank votes at an election could be an example.

Originally mentioned by security minister Chris Tang only, the term gradually became prominent as more local officials began adopting the phrase. Four years after "soft resistance" was first mentioned, several officials said threats of "soft resistance" are still raging in the city. It may take the form of performance content, song lyrics, and storylines according to the culture minister Rosanna Law. Development minister Bernadette Linn claimed "soft resistance" may arise in land development, compensation for resettlement, and reclamation projects, citing challenges from "ill-intended" environmental groups which deliberately stirred up opposition, and, without naming so, a graphic by Society for Protection of the Harbour that depicts reclaimed Victoria Harbour as "Victoria River". Tang said the earlier unusual wave of withdrawals from the organ donation register which attempted to rattle the system, as well as the existence of pro-protest Yellow Economic Circle, are examples of "soft resistance". Environment, medicine, education were also mentioned as places that could breed "soft resistance".

"Soft resistance" has also been used by pro-Beijing politicians and media, including state-controlled Ta Kung Pao and Wen Wei Po, to label different kinds of activities, from seminars to performances and from songs to books.

== Criticism ==
Critics feared "soft resistance" has become a convenient label for the authorities to punish dissidents. Former pro-democracy politicians said the term was used by the government to label those they considered as "rebellious". Emily Lau, the ex-chair of Democratic Party, said she did not think any journalists "should feel that you are safe", after Chris Tang claimed "soft resistance" from media outlets.

Candace Chong, a prominent playwright, concerned that actively looking for "soft resistance" would harm and disturb artists even with honest intention. Legal scholars said the term is initially used in mainland China on issues such as intraparty governance and personnel management, rather than for national security or protest activities; its usage in Hong Kong is "very vague" and not codified without conveying exactly what the authorities were thinking, adding that the word "resistance" was used to describe those who did not agree with the government.
