= Distrust =

Lack of interpersonal confidence

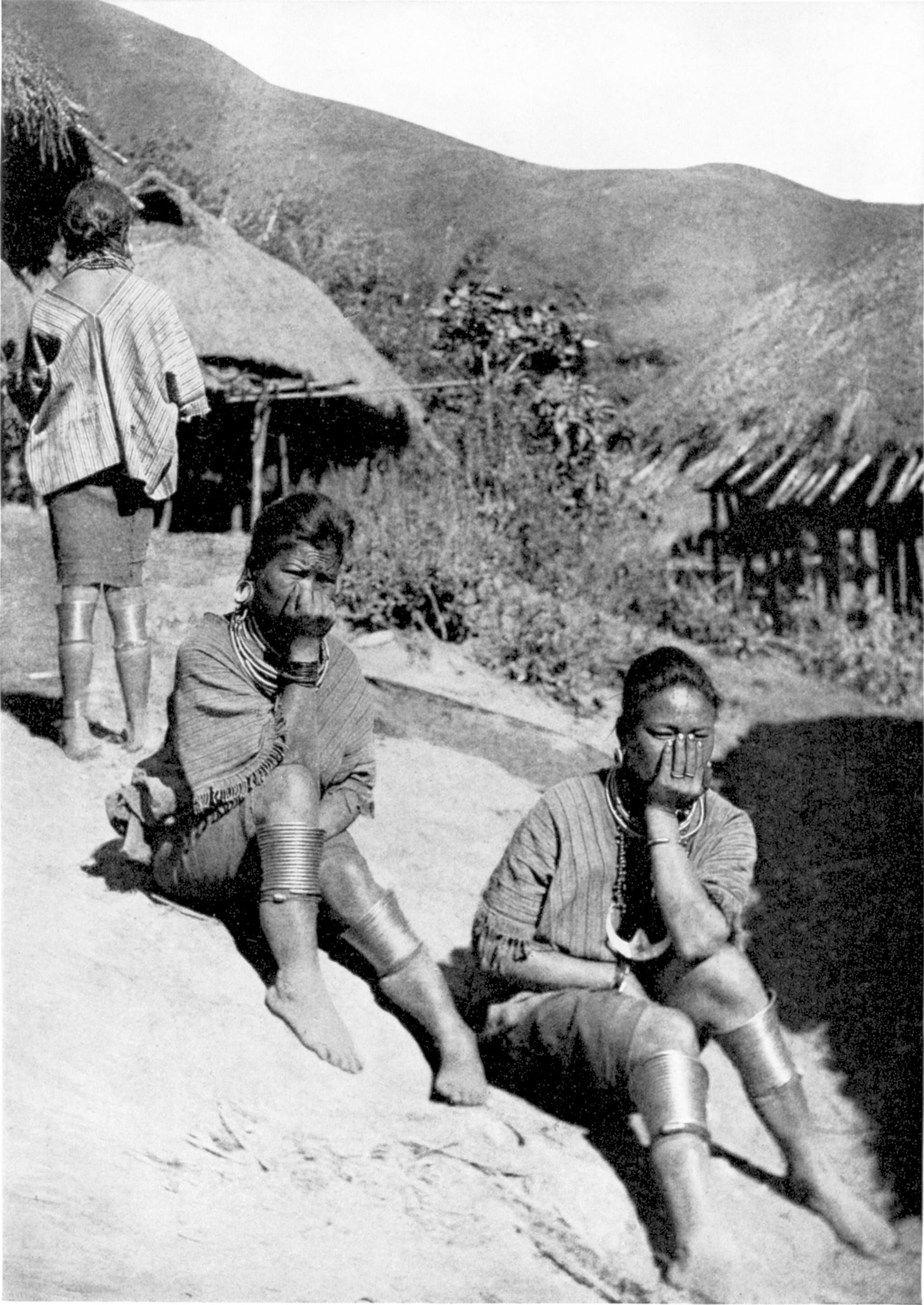
Brè women showing distrust of the photographer

Distrust is a formal way of not trusting any one party too much in a situation of grave risk or deep doubt. It is commonly expressed in civics as a division or balance of powers, or in politics as means of validating treaty terms. Systems based on distrust simply divide the responsibility so that checks and balances can operate. The phrase "trust, but verify" refers specifically to distrust.

== In systems of government ==
An electoral system inevitably is based on distrust, but not on mistrust. Parties compete in the system, but they do not compete to subvert the system itself, or gain bad faith advantage through it—if they do they are easily caught by the others. Much mistrust does exist between parties, and it is exactly this which motivates putting in place a formal system of distrust. Diplomatic protocol for instance, which applies between states, relies on such means as formal disapproval which in effect say "we do not trust that person". It also tends to rely on a strict etiquette—distrusting each person's habits to signal their intent, and instead relying on a global standard for behaviour in sensitive social settings.

Corporate governance relies on distrust insofar as the board is not to trust the reports it receives from management, but is empowered to investigate them, challenge them, and otherwise act on behalf of shareholders vs. managers. The fact that they rarely or never do so in most American companies is a sign that the distrust relationship has broken down—accounting scandals and calls for accounting reform are the inevitable result. It is precisely to avoid such larger crises of trust in "the system" that formal distrust measures are put in place to begin with.

== In computer science ==
A protocol as defined in computer science uses a more formal idea of distrust itself. Different parts of a system are not supposed to "trust" each other but rather perform specific assertions, requests and validations. Once these are passed, the responsibility for errors lies strictly with the receiving part of the system, not that which sent the original information. Applying this principle inside one program is called contract-based design.

== Neurochemical studies ==
Neuroeconomics explain how economists are attempting to understand why humans trust or distrust others by recording physiological measurements during trust experiments. Economists conducted an experiment observing distrust through a trust game. Subjects were asked to anonymously donate various amounts of money to other anonymous subjects with no guarantee of receiving money in return. Various conditions were run of the experiment and after each decision, subjects' levels of the hormone dihydrotestosterone (DHT) were measured. The results of this experiment suggest men and women respond to distrust physiologically differently; a heightened level of the hormone DHT in men is associated with distrust. However, more research is needed in order to accurately state the correlation between the amount of DHT present in males and responses to distrust.

== Sociological studies ==
It has been argued that by supporting healthy suspicion and vigilance, distrust does not always have detrimental consequences and can be related to positive outcomes. It has been shown to increase the speed and performance of individuals and groups at certain tasks. It has been empirically shown that distrust increases performance in nonroutine (creative, unstructured) tasks while decreasing performance in routine (cooperative, structured) tasks.

Research on high-risk settings such as oil platforms, investment banking, medical surgery, aircraft piloting and nuclear powerplants has related distrust to failure avoidance. When nonroutine strategies are needed, distrusting persons perform better, while when routine strategies are needed trusting persons perform better. This research was extended to entrepreneurial firms by Gudmundsson and Lechner. They argued that in entrepreneurial firms, the prospect of failure is ever present, resembling nonroutine situations in high-risk settings. They found that the firms of distrusting entrepreneurs were more likely to survive than the firms of optimistic or overconfident entrepreneurs, because the distrusting entrepreneurs would emphasize failure avoidance through sensible task selection, and more analysis. Kets de Vries has pointed out that distrusting entrepreneurs are more alert about their external environment. Thus, distrusting entrepreneurs are less likely to discount negative events, and are more likely to engage control mechanisms. Thus, according to Gudmundsson and Lechner distrust leads to higher precaution and therefore increases chances of entrepreneurial firm survival.

== See also ==
- Conscientiousness
- Cynicism (contemporary)
- Disgust
- Misanthropy
- Neuroticism
- Resentment
- Skepticism
- Suspicion (emotion)
