= Suspicion (emotion) =

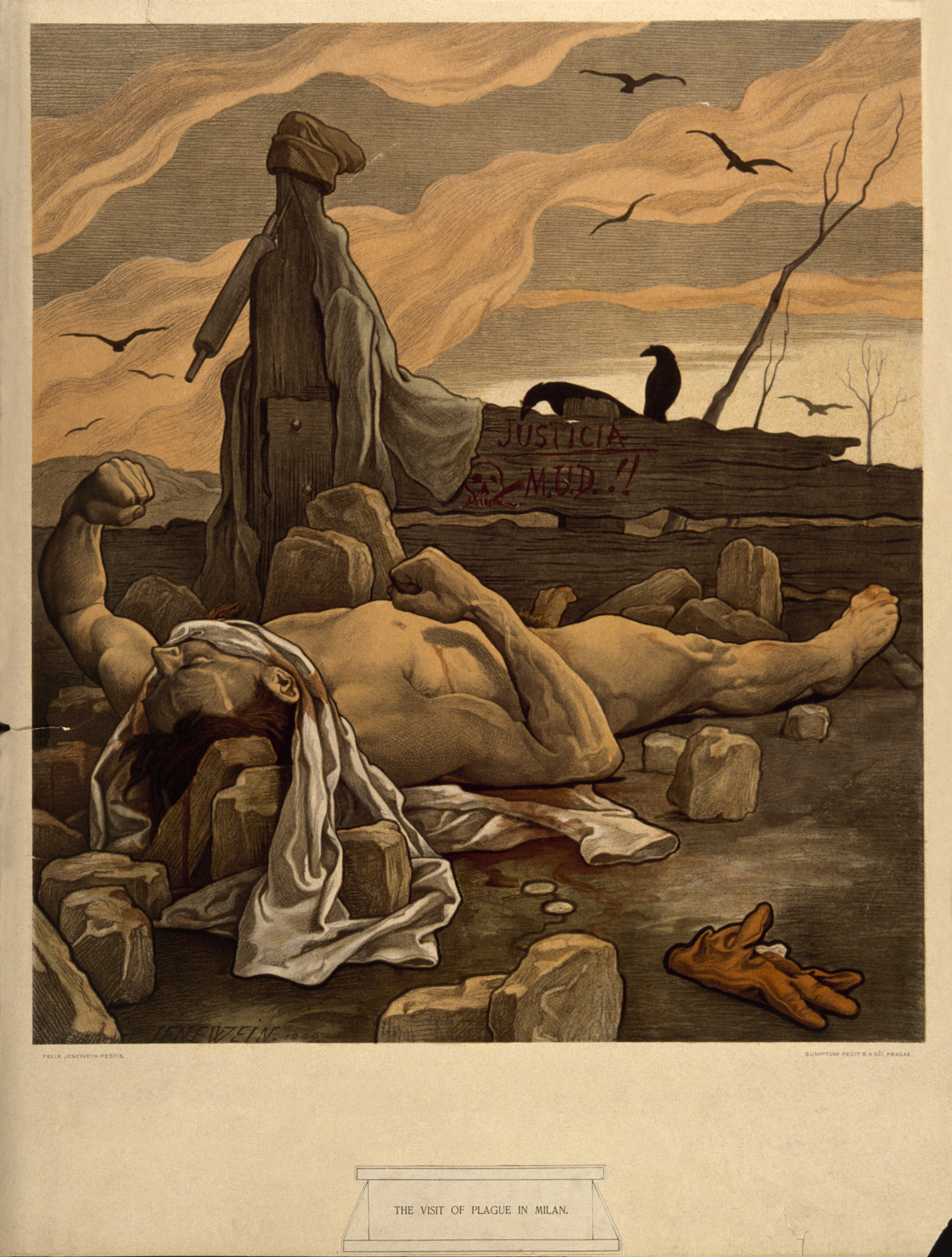
"The Visit of Plague in Milan" (F. Jenewein, 1899), a painting of a man stoned on suspicion of spreading the plague

Suspicion is a cognition of mistrust in which a person doubts the honesty of another person or believes another person to be guilty of some type of wrongdoing or crime, but without sure proof. Suspicion can also be aroused in response to objects that negatively differ from an expected idea. In the United States, the courts use the term "reasonable suspicion" in connection with the right of the police to stop people on the street. The word comes from Middle English via the Old French word "suspicion", which is a variation of the Italian word "sospetto" (a derivative of the Latin term "suspectio", which means "to watch").

== History ==
English philosopher, statesman, and author Francis Bacon (1561–1626) wrote an essay entitled Of Suspicion, in which he stated that suspicions need to be repressed and well-guarded, because otherwise they will cloud the mind, and cause a ruler to move towards tyranny, due to the fear that his subjects are conspiring against him, and a husband to become jealous and fearful of his wife's interactions with other men. Bacon argued that the root of suspicion was a lack of knowledge; as such, the remedy to suspicion was to learn more about the issue that is troubling you. If a husband is concerned about his wife's male friends, he should ask her about the nature of these friendships and state his concerns, rather than building up his suspicions. Bacon urged people who were harboring suspicions, to be frank with the people that they were suspecting, and clear the matter up.

The English dramatist William Shakespeare noted that "Suspicion always haunts the guilty mind". English Renaissance dramatist, poet, and actor Ben Jonson (1572–1637), a contemporary of Shakespeare, described suspicion as a "black poison" that "infects the human mind like a plague". Samuel Johnson (1709–1784), an English author and essayist, called suspicion a "useless pain" in which a person has a belief that a formidable evil lies within all of their fellow men. The Scottish poet and a lyricist Robert Burns (1759–1796) called suspicion a "heavy armor" that impedes humans more than it protects them. Mahatma Gandhi, the political and spiritual leader of the non-violent Indian independence movement, warned that if suspicions arise about any of a person's motives, then all of their acts can become tainted with this mistrust and uncertainty.

== See also ==
- Cabal
- Distrust
- Doubt
- Suspect
