= Susan Clancy =

American psychologist

Susan A. Clancy
- Education: Harvard University
- Known for: Abducted, The Trauma Myth, repressed memory
- Scientific career
- Fields: experimental psychology
- Workplaces: INCAE Business School

Susan A. Clancy is a cognitive psychologist and associate professor in Consumer behaviour at INCAE as well as a post-doctoral fellow at Harvard University. She is best known for her controversial work on repressed and recovered memories in her books Abducted and The Trauma Myth.

== Education ==
In 2001, Clancy received her PhD in experimental psychology from Harvard University.

== Career ==
Susan Clancy joined the Harvard University psychology department as a graduate student in 1995. There she began to study memory and the idea of repressed memories due to trauma. The debate in this field was strong at the time, with many clinicians arguing that we repress memories to protect ourselves from trauma that would be too hard to bear. Many cognitive psychologists, on the other hand, argued that true trauma is almost never forgotten, and that memories brought up years later through hypnosis are most likely false.

In 2003, Clancy remarked to Bruce Grierson of the New York Times that "nobody was doing research on the group that was at the center of the controversy -- the people who were reporting recovered memories. Memory function in that group had never been examined in the laboratory."

Clancy hypothesized that there was a group of people who were more susceptible to false memory creation and that this tendency might be demonstrated in the lab by giving standard memory tests. The tests included giving participants lists of related words and then later asking them to recall the first list by circling words from a second list that included similar words. Her data strongly suggested that some people are more likely to "remember" seeing similar words to those on the lists that weren't an exact match, more so than a control group. Essentially "creating a recollection out of a contextual inference, a fact from a feeling." These findings were published in the journal Psychological Science in 2000.

Her work was heavily criticized by some in the community. It was suggested that it could be possible that those with recovered memories of trauma, had such traumatic memories that they were not only repressed, but that they also manifested as cognitive impairment that could cause memory problems in test conditions like this study. Additionally, she received letters suggesting that even conducting this kind of research at all "cheers on child molesters" and ridicules the suffering of children. In 2000 when she was invited to speak at Cambridge Hospital, she was told that many in the psychiatric department protested her lecture.

Clancy decided at this point to find a new group to study. She began studying alien abductees, whose stories could produce more methodologically clear study results. She began canvassing for participants until she found 11 willing abductees. This posed its own challenges because many of the study participants do not believe in repressed memories, but rather some kind of extraterrestrial interpretation, such as the aliens erasing their memories or controlling their minds in some manner.

In 2003, Clancy took a position as a professor at the Harvard-affiliated Central American Business Administration Institute in Managua, Nicaragua. She went on to become the research director at the Harvard-affiliated Center for Women's Advancement, Development and Leadership in Nicaragua.

== Select bibliography ==
=== Abducted: How People Come to Believe They Were Kidnapped By Aliens ===
Published by Harvard University Press in 2005, Susan Clancy's book Abducted: How People Come to Believe They Were Kidnapped By Aliens was met with strong positive reviews. The book uses data derived from several memory studies on self described abductees that took place in the preceding few years. The book explores what mainstream experts believe to be the sources of abduction stories, such as sleep paralysis and the use of hypnosis techniques to "recover" forgotten memories. Clancy finds that previous interest in the paranormal and emotional investment also play a role in creating abduction memories.

Benedict Carey of the New York Times believes the book is about more than just aliens, that "the book hints at a larger ambition, to explain the psychology of transformative experiences, whether supposed abductions, conversions or divine visitations." Clancy demonstrates that alien abduction stories give people meaning and a way to understand their own lives and circumstances. It also gives them a feeling that they are not alone in the universe. Carey's take away is that, "in this sense, abduction memories are like transcendent religious visions, scary and yet somehow comforting and, at some personal psychological level, true." Paul McHugh, of The Wall Street Journal also points out that, no matter how bad the experience, none of the abductees regret it happening. Many of them feel that they were special or "chosen" for having these experiences.

Benedict Carey's only critique is that Clancy did not ask the abductees that she interviewed to share their religious beliefs, which he notes that Clancy herself regretted as well. He concludes that "when it comes to sounding the depths of alien stories, a scientific inquiry like this one may have to end with an inquiry into religion."

In an interview with Madeleine Brand on the Day to Day radio show by NPR, Clancy responds to the question of how her interview subjects responded to the publishing of her book. She explains:

I can tell you most of them that have read the book are upset. I have to be honest with that. And I understand why, because what's happening in the book is I am presenting my own opinion, but I'm challenging their deeply held beliefs, beliefs that are very important to them. So they're angry, and I feel terribly about it.

Clancy, in response to the idea that alien abduction experiences are similar to religious beliefs and experiences says:

All I would like to say is that in the same way that people find meaning in their religious beliefs and experiences, these people find meaning in their alien abduction beliefs and their alien abduction experiences.

=== The Trauma Myth: The Truth about the Sexual Abuse of Children—and its Aftermath ===
This book, published in 2010, got its beginning when Clancy was working on her graduate research project in the mid-1990s and she began interviewing adult survivors of childhood sexual abuse. Much to her surprise, she found that most of the victims of childhood abuse did not feel trauma, in the usual sense of the word, until they grew old enough to really understand what had happened.

One of the most common feelings among her sample was self-blame. The majority of those interviewed never experienced violence or remembered feeling pain, rather it was mainly confusion at the time. But the psychological damage begins when they realize that their trust and innocence had been betrayed. It is this feeling of participation from the victim that causes the greatest distress later in life. Clancy says that ninety-five percent of childhood sexual abuse victims never seek treatment because of their false beliefs about what abuse should look like:

You get all these people who are keeping it a secret because they're ashamed — because what happened to them is not what is portrayed in the media or psychological and medical circles.

There was much outrage over the findings presented in this book.

When questioned about the critique that her book could be arguing that children are not hurt by sexual abuse, Clancy says, "I will never say that. I could not be more clear. This is an atrocious, disgusting crime." Many have also accused Clancy and this book of encouraging child abusers. To this she responds that:

Sexual abuse is never OK. No matter what the circumstances are, or how it impacts the victims, sexual abuse is an atrocious, despicable crime. Just because it rarely physically or psychologically damages the child does not mean it is OK. Harmfulness is not the same thing as wrongfulness. And why is it wrong? Because children are incapable of consent.

Clancy argues that her model is what may truly help the adult survivors of childhood sexual abuse. These survivors are often ashamed of their behavior and that they did not fight back, they blame themselves and often do not speak about the events or even believe that what happened to them can be considered abuse. She finds that it can be very beneficial for these survivors to learn that their experience and their reaction, or lack of reaction, was normal. According to an interview with Susan Pinker, writing for The Globe and Mail in 2010, Clancy makes it clear through her book "that children are never at fault, that sexual abuse is always a crime and that the blame always rests with the adult."

This book also addresses the idea of repressed memory. Clancy argues that the reason many children do not remember sexual abuse until later in life was that it simply was not memorable at the time. She says in an interview with Salon:

What therapists in the sexual abuse field refer to as repression is actually simple forgetting. Most children who get abused don't understand it at the time. Thus, it is not a significant experience when it happens — it's weird, perhaps — and so they forget it, like we forget so many aspects of childhood. Later on in life they may be asked by a therapist, "Were you sexually abused as a child?" and this question will cue a memory. When this happens it is not an example of a recovered memory. It is an example of normal forgetting and remembering.

On how we should treat sexual abuse victims, Clancy says:

I think practically, sexual abuse victims need to hear loud and clear that what happened to you is what happens to most people. It was wrong and not your fault, and you should report the crime, and the perpetrator should be punished.

=== Journal articles ===
- ¿Por qué no hay más Mujeres en la Cima de la Escala Corporativa: Debido a Estereotipos, a Diferencias Biológicas o a Escogencias Personales? / Why aren’t more Women at the Top of the Corporate Ladder: Stereotypes, Biological Differences or Choices (2007)
- Autobiographical memory specificity in adults reporting repressed, recovered, or continuous memories of childhood sexual abuse (2006)
- Clinical characteristics of adults reporting repressed, recovered, or continuous memories of childhood sexual abuse (2006)
- Sleep paralysis and recovered memories of childhood sexual abuse: A reply to Pendergrast (2006)
- Who needs repression? Normal memory processes can explain “forgetting” of childhood sexual abuse (2005)
- Sleep Paralysis, Sexual Abuse, and Space Alien Abduction (2005)
- Sleep paralysis in adults reporting repressed, recovered, or continuous memories of childhood sexual abuse (2005)
- Reality Monitoring in Adults Reporting Repressed, Recovered, or Continuous Memories of Childhood Sexual Abuse (2005)
- Inhibiting retrieval of trauma cues in adults reporting histories of childhood sexual abuse (2004)
- Psychophysiological Responding During Script-Driven Imagery in People Reporting Abduction by Space Aliens (2004)
- Reconceptualizing the teaching team in universities: Working with sessional staff (2002)
- Memory distortion in people reporting abduction by aliens (2002)
- Directed forgetting of trauma cues in adults reporting repressed or recovered memories of childhood sexual abuse (2001)
- False Recognition in Women Reporting Recovered Memories of Sexual Abuse (2000)
- Personality profiles, dissociations, and absorption in women reporting repressed, recovered, or continuous memories of childhood sexual abuse (2000)
- Cognitive processing of trauma cues in adults reporting repressed, recovered, or continuous memories of childhood sexual abuse (2000)
- Effects of guided imagery on memory distortion in women reporting recovered memories of childhood sexual abuse (1999)
- Cardiorespiratory Symptoms in Response to Physiological Arousal (1998)
- Directed forgetting of trauma cues in adult survivors of childhood sexual abuse with and without posttraumatic stress disorder (1998)
- Differential diagnosis of palpitations. Preliminary development of a screening instrument (1996)
- Somatized Psychiatric Disorder Presenting as Palpitations. Archives of Internal Medicine (1996)

== See also ==
- Repressed memory
- Hypnosis
- Alien abduction
- Experimental psychology
