= Barney and Betty Hill incident =

Alleged alien abduction in 1961

Coordinates: 43°54′31″N 71°39′50″W

Betty and Barney Hill
- Betty (left) and Barney Hill (right) with their dog, Delsey
- Born: Barney Hill Jr.: July 20, 1922; Newport News, Virginia; Eunice Elizabeth Barrett: June 28, 1919; Newton, New Hampshire
- Died: Barney: February 25, 1969 (aged 46); Betty: October 17, 2004 (aged 85); Portsmouth, New Hampshire
- Occupations: Postal worker, civil rights activist (Barney); Social worker, civil rights advocate (Betty)
- Known for: Claim of alien abduction

Barney and Betty Hill were an American couple and civil rights activists who claimed they were abducted by extraterrestrials in a rural portion of the state of New Hampshire from September 19 to 20, 1961. The incident came to be called the "Hill Abduction" and the "Zeta Reticuli Incident" because two ufologists connected the star map allegedly shown to Betty Hill with the Zeta Reticuli system. Their story was adapted into the best-selling 1966 book The Interrupted Journey and NBC's 1975 television film The UFO Incident.

Most of Betty Hill's notes, tapes, and other items have been placed in the permanent collection at the University of New Hampshire, her alma mater. In July 2011, the New Hampshire Division of Historical Resources marked the site of the alleged craft's first approach with a historical marker.

The Hills' story was widely publicized in books and movies.

== Background ==
The Hills lived in Portsmouth, New Hampshire. Barney (1922–1969) was a World War II veteran employed by the United States Postal Service, while Betty (née Eunice Barrett) (1919–2004) was a social worker. Active in the local Unitarian congregation, the Hills were also members of the NAACP and community leaders, and Barney sat on a local board of the United States Commission on Civil Rights. They were an interracial couple at a time when it was particularly uncommon in the United States; Barney was black and Betty was white.

Barney and Betty Hill are paternal grandparents of current UFC strawweight Angela Hill.

== UFO encounter ==
According to a variety of reports given by the Hills, the alleged UFO sighting happened about 10:30 p.m. September 19, 1961. The Hills were driving back to Portsmouth from a vacation in Niagara Falls and Montreal. Just south of Lancaster, New Hampshire, Betty claimed to have observed a bright point of light in the sky that moved from below the Moon and the planet Jupiter, upward to the west of the Moon. While Barney navigated U.S. Route 3, Betty reasoned that she was observing a falling star, only it moved upward. Because it moved erratically and grew bigger and brighter, Betty urged Barney to stop the car for a closer look, as well as to walk their dog, Delsey. Barney stopped at a scenic picnic area just south of Twin Mountain.

Betty, looking through binoculars, observed an "odd-shaped" craft flashing multicolored lights travelling across the face of the Moon. Because her sister had several years earlier said she had seen a flying saucer, Betty thought that might be what she was observing. Through binoculars, Barney observed what he reasoned was a commercial airliner traveling toward Vermont on its way to Montreal. However, he soon changed his mind, because without looking as if it had turned, the craft rapidly descended in his direction. This observation caused Barney to realize, "this object that was a plane was not a plane."

The Hills said they continued driving on the quiet and isolated road, moving very slowly through Franconia Notch in order to observe the object as it came even closer. At one point, the object passed above a restaurant and signal tower on top of Cannon Mountain and came out near the Old Man of the Mountain. Betty testified that it was at least one and a half times the length of the granite cliff profile, which was 40 feet (12 m) long, and that it seemed to be rotating. The couple watched as the silent, illuminated craft moved erratically and bounced back and forth in the night sky.

About one mile (1.6 km) south of Indian Head, they stated that the object rapidly descended toward their vehicle, causing Barney to stop in the middle of the highway. The huge, silent craft hovered about 80 to 100 feet (24 to 30 m) above the Hills' 1957 Chevrolet Bel Air and filled the entire field of view in the windshield. It reminded Barney of a huge pancake. Carrying his pistol in his pocket, Barney stepped away from the vehicle and moved closer to the object. Using the binoculars, he claimed to have seen eight to eleven humanoid figures, who were peering out of the craft's windows, seemingly in his direction. In unison, all but one figure moved to what appeared to be a panel on the rear wall of the hallway that encircled the front portion of the craft. The one remaining figure continued to look at Barney and communicated a message telling him to "stay where you are and keep looking." Barney had a recollection of observing the humanoid forms wearing glossy black uniforms and black caps. Red lights on what appeared to be bat-wing fins began to telescope out of the sides of the craft, and a long structure descended from the bottom of the craft. The silent craft approached to what Barney estimated was within 50 to 80 feet (15 to 24 m) overhead and 300 feet (91 m) away from him. Barney, fearing capture by these beings, ran back to the car terrified. As the Hills sped away, they heard a strange beeping sound and fell into a daze. When they awoke, they realized they were now just outside of Concord. On October 21, 1961, Barney reported to National Investigations Committee On Aerial Phenomena (NICAP) investigator Walter Webb that the "beings were somehow not human".

== Immediate aftermath ==
Arriving home around dawn, the Hills stated that they had some odd sensations and impulses they could not readily explain: Betty insisted their luggage be kept near the back door rather than in the main part of the house. Their watches would never work again. Barney said that the leather strap for the binoculars was torn, though he could not recall it tearing. The toes of his best dress shoes were scraped. He further said he was compelled to examine his genitals in the bathroom, though he found nothing unusual. They took long showers to remove possible contamination, and each drew a picture of what they had observed.

Perplexed, the Hills say they tried to reconstruct the chronology of events as they witnessed the UFO and drove home. But immediately after they heard the buzzing sounds, their memories became incomplete and fragmented. After sleeping for a few hours, Betty awoke and placed the shoes and clothing she had worn during the drive into her closet, observing that the dress was torn at the hem, zipper, and lining. Later, when she retrieved the items from her closet, she noted a pinkish powder on her dress. She hung the dress on her clothesline; however, though the pink powder blew away, the dress was irreparably damaged. She went to dispose of it, but then changed her mind, retrieving the dress and hanging it in her closet. Over the years, five laboratories have conducted chemical and forensic analyses on the garment.

There were shiny, concentric circles on their car's trunk that had not been there the previous day. Betty and Barney experimented with a compass, noting that when they moved it close to the spots, the needle would whirl rapidly. But when they moved it a few inches away from the shiny spots, it would drop down.

=== Initial report to the U.S. Air Force and NICAP ===
The Hills first called a close friend named Buz Sawyer, police chief of Newton, who advised them to call Pease AFB.

Walter N. Webb, a Boston astronomer and NICAP member, met with the Hills on October 21, 1961. In a six-hour interview, the Hills related all they could remember about the UFO encounter. Barney stated that he had developed a "mental block", and that he suspected there were some portions of the event that he did not wish to remember. He described in detail all that he could remember about the craft and the appearance of the "somehow not human" figures aboard it. Webb asserted his conclusion that "they were telling the truth and the incident probably occurred exactly as reported except for some minor uncertainties and technicalities that must be tolerated in any such observations where human judgment is involved (e.g., exact time and length of visibility, apparent sizes of object and occupants, distance and height of object, etc.)."

== Betty's dreams ==
Ten days after the alleged UFO encounter, Betty began having a series of vivid dreams, which continued for five successive nights. She stated that she experienced them with a degree of detail and intensity that she had never had before. After the fifth night, they stopped and never recurred, though they occupied her thoughts during the day. When she mentioned them to Barney, he was sympathetic, but not too concerned, and the issue was not explored further at the time. Betty did not mention them to Barney again.

In November 1961, Betty began writing down the details of her dreams. In one dream, she and Barney encountered a roadblock and men who surrounded their car. She lost consciousness but struggled to regain it. Then she realized that she was being forced by two small men to walk in a forest at night, and of seeing Barney walking behind her, though when she called to him, he seemed to be in a trance or sleepwalking. The men stood about five to five feet four inches (1.5 m–1.63 m) and wore matching blue uniforms, with caps similar to those worn by military cadets. They appeared nearly human, with black hair, dark eyes, prominent noses, and bluish lips. Their skin was a greyish color.

She and Barney were taken to their car, where the leader suggested that they wait to watch the craft's departure. They did so, and then resumed their drive home.

== Medical help and more interviews ==
=== Missing time ===
On November 25, 1961, the Hills were again interviewed at length by NICAP members, this time C. D. Jackson and Robert E. Hohmann. Having read Webb's initial report, Jackson and Hohmann had many questions for the Hills. One of their main lines of inquiry regarded the amount of time that had elapsed during their drive. Although the Hills had noted that they had arrived home later than anticipated, they did not realize that the length of the trip following their departure from Colebrook had stretched to a full seven hours, three hours more than the expected duration of a 178-mile (286 km) drive. When Hohman and Jackson noted this discrepancy to the Hills, the couple had no explanation (a phenomenon ufologists call "missing time"). The Hills claimed to recall almost nothing of the 35 miles of U.S. Route 3 between Lincoln/Indian Head and Ashland. Both claimed to recall an image of a fiery orb sitting on the ground. Betty and Barney reasoned that it must have been the moon, but Hohmann and Jackson informed them that the moon had set earlier in the evening.

The subject of hypnosis came up, and it was decided that it should be carried out in order to recover previously irretrievable memories. Barney was apprehensive, but thought it might help Betty put to rest what Barney described as "the 'nonsense' about her dreams."

=== Private disclosure ===
On November 23, 1962, the Hills attended a meeting at the parsonage of their church, where Captain Ben H. Swett of the United States Air Force was a guest speaker. Having had an interest in hypnosis, the Hills approached Swett privately and related their strange encounter. Swett was particularly interested in the "missing time" of the Hills' account. The Hills asked if he would hypnotize them to recover their memories, but Swett declined and cautioned them against going to an amateur hypnotist, such as himself.

== Simon's hypnosis sessions ==
=== Barney's sessions ===
Under hypnosis with Boston psychiatrist Benjamin Simon, Barney reported that the binocular strap had broken when he ran from the UFO back to his car, as was consistent with his conscious recall. He further remembered driving the vehicle away from the UFO, but afterward, he felt irresistibly compelled to pull off the road and drive into the woods. He eventually sighted six men standing on the dirt road. The car stalled and three of the men approached the car.

Barney described the beings as generally similar to Betty's hypnotic recollection. He said they stared into his eyes with a terrifying, mesmerizing effect. Under hypnosis, Barney said, "Oh, those eyes. They're there in my brain" (from his first hypnosis session) and "I was told to close my eyes because I saw two eyes coming close to mine, and I felt like the eyes had pushed into my eyes" (from his second hypnosis session) and "All I see are these eyes... I'm not even afraid that they're not connected to a body. They're just there. They're just up close to me, pressing against my eyes."

While Betty reported a conversation with the "leader" in English, Barney said that he heard them speaking in a mumbling language he did not understand. Betty also mentioned this detail. The few times they communicated with him, Barney said it seemed to be "thought transference" (at that time, he was unfamiliar with the word "telepathy").

=== Betty's sessions ===
Under hypnosis, Betty's account was similar to her five dreams about the alleged UFO abduction, with some notable differences, mainly pertaining to her capture and release. Also, the technology on the craft, the short men's physical appearance, and the sequential order of the abduction events differed to varying degrees. Barney's and Betty's memories in hypnotic regression were, however, consistent with one another.

=== Simon's conclusions ===
When the series of hypnosis sessions were complete, Simon wrote an article about the Hills for the journal Psychiatric Opinion, explaining his conclusion that the case was a singular psychological aberration.

== Post-hypnosis publicity and Barney's and Betty's death ==
The Hills went back to their regular lives. They were willing to discuss the alleged UFO encounter with friends and family, but the Hills apparently made no effort to seek publicity. In fact, when told that reporter John H. Luttrell had begun interviewing friends and family of the couple in August 1965 for the Boston Traveler, the Hills refused to be involved and asked that the article not be run.

On October 25, 1965, a front page story in the Boston Traveler asked "UFO Chiller: Did THEY Seize Couple?" Reporter John H. Luttrell of the Traveler had allegedly been given an audio tape recording of a lecture the Hills had made in Quincy Center in late 1963. Luttrell learned that the Hills had undergone hypnosis with Simon; he also obtained notes from confidential interviews the Hills had given to UFO investigators. On October 26, United Press International (UPI) picked up Luttrell's story, and the Hills' story was given international exposure.

In 1966, writer John G. Fuller secured the cooperation of the Hills and Simon and wrote the book The Interrupted Journey (see below) about the case. The book included a copy of Betty's sketch of the "star map". The book was a quick success and went through several printings.

Barney died of a cerebral hemorrhage on February 25, 1969, at age 46, after which Betty went on to become a celebrity in the UFO community.

Betty died of cancer on October 17, 2004, at age 85, having never remarried.

== Analyzing the star map ==
Marjorie Fish's interpretation of Betty Hill's purported alien star map, with "Sol" (upper right) being the Latin name for the Sun

In 1968, Marjorie Fish of Oak Harbor, Ohio, read Fuller's book, Interrupted Journey. Fish was an elementary school teacher and amateur astronomer. Intrigued by the "star map," Fish wondered if it might be "deciphered" to determine which star system the alleged UFO came from. Assuming that one of the fifteen stars on the map must represent Earth's Sun, Fish constructed a three-dimensional model of nearby Sun-like stars (i.e., stars deemed to have characteristics that could support life such as that found on Earth) using thread and beads, basing stellar distances on those published in the 1969 Gliese Star Catalogue. Studying thousands of vantage points over several years, the only one that seemed to match the Hill map was from the viewpoint of the double star system of Zeta Reticuli (about 39 light-years from Earth).

Fish sent her analysis to Webb. Agreeing with her conclusions, Webb sent the map to Terence Dickinson, editor of the magazine Astronomy. Dickinson did not endorse Fish and Webb's conclusions, but for the first time in the journal's history, Astronomy invited comments and debate on a UFO report, starting with an opening article in the December 1974 issue. For about a year afterward, the opinions page of Astronomy carried arguments for and against Fish's star map. Notable was an argument made by Carl Sagan and Steven Soter, arguing that the "star map" was little more than a random alignment of chance points. In an episode of Cosmos in 1980, Sagan demonstrated that without the lines drawn in the maps, the Hill map bore no resemblance to the real-life map. In contrast, those more favorable to the map, such as David Saunders, a statistician who had been on the Condon UFO study, disagreed. Saunders claimed that a match among sixteen stars of the specific spectral type among the thousand stars nearest the Sun is "at least 1,000 to 1 against".

In the early 1990s, the European Hipparcos ("high precision parallax collecting satellite") mission, which analyzed the distances to more than a hundred thousand stars within the Sun's stellar neighborhood to a higher degree of accuracy than previous attempts, indicated that some of the stars in Fish's interpretation of the map were much further away than previously thought. Other scientific findings have suggested that some of the stellar candidates previously considered by Fish as likely to host life due to matching certain criteria no longer fit that criteria according to emerging data, while some other stars that had been discounted by Fish have since been recognized as potential abodes for life. Results such as these led Fish herself to reject her previous hypothesis in a public statement.

== Publications ==
The 1966 publication of Interrupted Journey, by John G. Fuller, details much of the Hills' claims. Excerpts of the book were published in Look magazine.

Captured! The Betty and Barney Hill UFO Experience by Betty Hill's niece Kathleen Marden further explored Fuller's themes along with scientist Stanton T. Friedman. Marden, who sat on the board of the Mutual UFO Network (MUFON) for 10 years, knew Betty well and had spoken with her at great length about the encounter.

== Skeptical rebuttals ==
Jim Macdonald, a resident of the area in which the Hills claimed to have been abducted, has produced a detailed analysis of their journey which concludes that the episode was provoked by their misperceiving an aircraft warning beacon on Cannon Mountain as a UFO. Macdonald notes that from the road the Hills took, the beacon appears and disappears at exactly the same time the Hills describe the UFO as appearing and disappearing. The remainder of the experience is ascribed to stress, sleep deprivation, and false memories "recovered" under hypnosis. After reading Macdonald's recreation, skeptic Robert Sheaffer writes that the Hills are the "poster children" for not driving when sleep deprived. In the Skeptical Inquirer, Sheaffer also wrote:

"I was present at the National UFO Conference in New York City in 1980, at which Betty presented some of the UFO photos she had taken. She showed what must have been far more than 200 slides, mostly of blips, blurs, and blobs against a dark background. These were supposed to be UFOs coming in close, chasing her car, landing, etc. ... After her talk had exceeded about twice its allotted time, Betty was literally jeered off the stage by what had been at first a sympathetic audience. This incident, witnessed by many of UFOlogy's leaders and top activists, removed any lingering doubts about Betty's credibility — she had none. In 1995, Betty Hill wrote a self-published book, A Common Sense Approach to UFOs. It is filled with delusional stories, such as seeing entire squadrons of UFOs in flight and a truck levitating above the freeway."

Sheaffer later wrote that as late as 1977, Betty Hill would go on UFO vigils at least three times a week. One evening she was joined by UFO enthusiast John Oswald. When asked about Betty's continuing UFO observations, Oswald stated, "She is not really seeing UFOs, but she is calling them that." On the night they went out together, "Mrs. Hill was unable to distinguish between a landed UFO and a streetlight." In a later interview, Sheaffer recounts that Betty Hill wrote, "UFOs are a new science ... and our science cannot explain them."

Robert Sheaffer released 48 pages of archived documents relating to Betty and Barney Hill, Benjamin Simon, and Philip J. Klass on the Internet on December 23, 2015.

=== Influence from The Outer Limits ===
The alien from "The Bellero Shield", aired 1964-02-10

The glowing-eyed alien from "The Children of Spider County", aired 1964-02-17

A clear shot of the alien from "The Children of Spider County"

The drawing Barney Hill made under hypnosis, 1964-02-22

First glimpse of the alien in "The Children of Spider County", as it holds up its hands to stop the protagonist's car

In his 1990 article "Entirely Unpredisposed", Martin Kottmeyer suggested that Barney's memories revealed under hypnosis might have been influenced by "The Bellero Shield", an episode of the science fiction anthology series The Outer Limits which had been broadcast on February 10, 1964, about two weeks before Barney's first hypnotic session. The episode featured an unnamed extraterrestrial with large eyes who says, "In all the universes, in all the unities beyond the universes, all who have eyes have eyes that speak." The report from the regression featured a scenario that was in some respects similar to the television show. In part, Kottmeyer wrote:

Wraparound eyes are an extreme rarity in science fiction films. I know of only one instance. They appeared on the alien of an episode of an old TV series The Outer Limits titled "The Bellero Shield". A person familiar with Barney's sketch in The Interrupted Journey and the sketch done in collaboration with the artist David Baker will find a "frisson" of "déjà vu" creeping up his spine when seeing this episode. The resemblance is much abetted by an absence of ears, hair, and nose on both aliens. Could it be by chance? Consider this: Barney first described and drew the wraparound eyes during the hypnosis session dated 22 February 1964. "The Bellero Shield" was first broadcast on 10 February 1964. Only twelve days separate the two instances. If the identification is admitted, the commonness of wraparound eyes in the abduction literature falls to cultural forces.

When a different researcher asked Betty about The Outer Limits, she insisted she had "never heard of it". Kottmeyer also pointed out that some motifs in the Hills' account were present in the film Invaders from Mars (1953).

In 2012 Jason Colavito pointed out that in fact "The Bellero Shield" was "the least important" of the three Outer Limits episodes that aired in the weeks prior to Barney Hill's February 22, 1964, recovery of "grey alien" memories. The episodes of February 3 and February 17 were even more reminiscent of Hill's story.

The episode of February 3, 1964, titled "The Invisibles", featured an alien intelligence which orchestrates a conspiracy of human "hosts" (parasitized by the alien organism) and willing servants. The process of becoming a servant involves lying face-down on a table and having one's lower back scratched with a scalpel, then having an alien organism placed on the wound to see if it will attach. The surgical procedure is narrated in detail by an alien instructor, and is shown three times (although the camera sees only the protagonist's naked upper body and gritted teeth). Colavito states that "[t]he surgical scenes, including the partial nudity, recall the [anal] alien probing described by Barney Hill."

The episode of February 17, 1964, titled "The Children of Spider County", featured a storyline involving the abduction of four men by an alien with wraparound eyes, which glow menacingly. Early in the episode the protagonist's car is stopped (in fact, wrecked) by the alien. The protagonist has always belonged to a socially outcast group; eventually it is revealed that the protagonist is half-alien himself. He is accompanied by his girlfriend, over the disapproval of her father. Colavito suggests that these similarities to Barney Hill's own biography go "beyond coincidental" and encouraged him to mingle the more fantastical elements of the story into his hypnosis-induced recollections. "The Children of Spider County" aired five days before Hill's February 22 hypnosis session.

Meanwhile, Colavito also relates the Hills' recovered memories of aliens in "shiny black jackets" to the Twilight Zone episode of January 31, 1964, titled "Black Leather Jackets", in which three aliens disguised as humans in black leather jackets come to Earth, but one of them falls in love with a human. Coincidentally, Lee Kinsolving plays the alien in love with a human in both "The Children of Spider County" and "Black Leather Jackets".

== Sociological analysis ==
Twentieth century academics such as Jodi Dean observed that accounts of the incident tended to downplay the Hills' interracial relationship, which had only recently become legal in 1961 and was still very unusual at that time. Sociologist David Drysdale has suggested that the abduction account serves to provide a new social perception of the Hills' relationship. According to his abduction experience, Barney Hill ceased to exist as an African-American man and as half of an interracial couple; instead, he became generic, deracialized "data" for an extraterrestrial experiment with no relation to American society at all. By reproducing the supposed abduction in a publication, Barney and Betty Hill were able to represent themselves in such a deracialized way. While alien abduction was presented as a violation and a traumatic experience, it was also an escape from the ongoing social trauma of racism in the United States. Researcher Dell Rose has expanded Drysdale's analysis to compare other UFO abduction stories to slave narratives.

Such a sociological interpretation of the abduction experience conflicts with the conscious actions of Barney Hill. As historian Matthew Bowman points out, Hill was concerned that mockery of his experiences would make his work for the NAACP and for the integration of his Unitarian church more difficult; in fact, he did experience such backlash.

== In popular media ==
=== Nonfictional depictions ===
Barney Hill appeared in an episode of To Tell the Truth, episode airdate December 12, 1966.

In 2004, Betty Hill's niece Kathleen Marden, together with nuclear physicist and ufologist Stanton Friedman, authored Captured, concerning the case.

In 2021, the melodic death metal band Hypocrisy on their full-length album Worship featured a song called "Bug in the Net" based on this event.

A fact-based account appears in the 2023 Dark Horse Comics series Blue Book: 1961, written by James Tynion IV with art by Michael Avon Oeming.

=== In fiction ===
- The 1975 film The UFO Incident is a television dramatization of the Hills' abduction and its aftermath, in which the Hills are played by James Earl Jones and Estelle Parsons.
- The purported event as well as other UFO lore figures into the 2012 comic book series Saucer Country scripted by Paul Cornell.
- The ancient star maps shown at the beginning of the 2012 film Prometheus are based on the star map drawn by Betty Hill and depicted the Zeta Reticuli system.
- In 2018, the story formed the basis of the "Dinner Party" virtual reality exhibit at the traveling art show Wonderspaces.
- The ninth episode of the 2019 History Channel television series Project Blue Book, entitled "Abduction", is based on the Betty and Barney Hill UFO incident.
- The track "The Ballad of Betty and Barney Hill", from Angelo De Augustine's 2023 album Toil and Trouble, recounts the incident from the point-of-view of an alien, "traveling through the Whitе Mountains to Zeta Reticuli".
- Actors Demi Moore and Colman Domingo are set to portray Betty and Barney in the upcoming film Strange Arrivals, directed by Roger Ross Williams, based on case.
- The 2025 novel Beings by Ilana Masad is centered around a fictionalized depiction of Betty and Barney Hill, presented through a fictional archivist who investigates and comments on their experience of alien abduction.

== See also ==
- Close encounter – Alleged encounter with a UFO or its occupants
- Grey alien – Alleged type of extraterrestrial being
- List of reported UFO sightings – Alleged accounts of UFOs
- Planet Serpo – Planet appearing in UFO conspiracy theories
- Zeta Reticuli – Binary star system in the constellation Reticulum

== Book sources ==
- Clark, Jerome. The UFO Book: Encyclopedia of the Extraterrestrial. Visible Ink, 1998. ISBN 0-780-81659-5
- Friedman, Stanton, & Kathleen Marden. Captured! The Betty and Barney Hill UFO Experience. Franklin Lakes, NJ: New Page Books, 2007. ISBN 1-632-65187-4
- Fuller, John G. (1975). "Interrupted Journey." (mass market paperback edition) Berkley Publishing Group. ISBN 0-425-03002-4.
- Hopkins, Budd. Hypnosis and the Investigation of UFO Abduction Claims. pp. 215–40 in "UFOs and Abductions: Challenging the Borders of Knowledge," David M. Jacobs, ed. University Press of Kansas, 2000. ISBN 0-7006-1032-4)
- Roth, Christopher F. Ufology as Anthropology: Race, Extraterrestrials, and the Occult."coaccess". apps.crossref.org. doi:10.1215/9780822387015-002. S2CID 192125982. Archived from the original on December 7, 2021. In "E.T. Culture: Anthropology in Outerspaces," Debbora Battaglia, ed. Durham, NC: Duke University Press, 2005.
- Watson, Nigel. Captured by Aliens? A History and Analysis of American Abduction Claims. Jefferson, North Carolina: McFarland, 2020. ISBN 9781476681412
- Watson, Nigel. "On the Credibility of the Barney and Betty Hill Abduction Case" in Ballester-Olmos, V.J. and Heiden, Richard W. (Eds.), The Reliability of UFO Witness Testimony. UPIAR, Turin, Italy (2023), pp. 220–228. ISBN 979-12-81441-00-2
- Webb, Walter. "A Dramatic UFO Encounter in the White Mountains, NH." Confidential report to NICAP. August 30, 1965."A Dramatic UFO Encounter in the White Mountains, NH" (PDF). NICAP. Archived (PDF) from the original on February 4, 2021.
