= 18th Golden Globe Awards =

Film award ceremony in 1961

- Date: March 16, 1961

Highlights
- Best Film: Drama: Spartacus
- Best Film: Comedy: The Apartment
- Best Film: Musical: Song Without End

The 18th Golden Globe Awards, honoring the best in film for 1960, were held on March 16, 1961.

== Winners and nominees ==
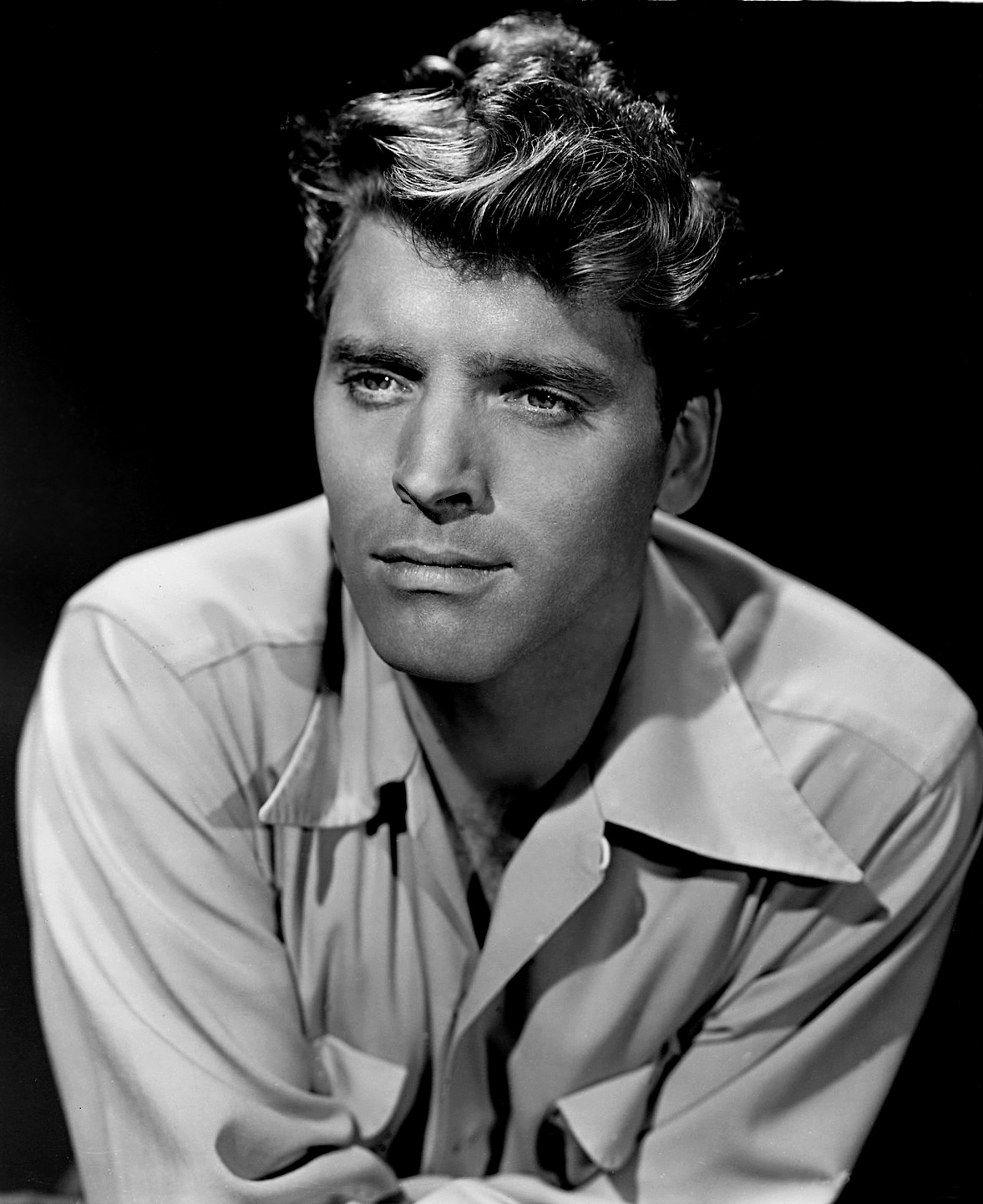
Burt Lancaster won for Elmer Gantry

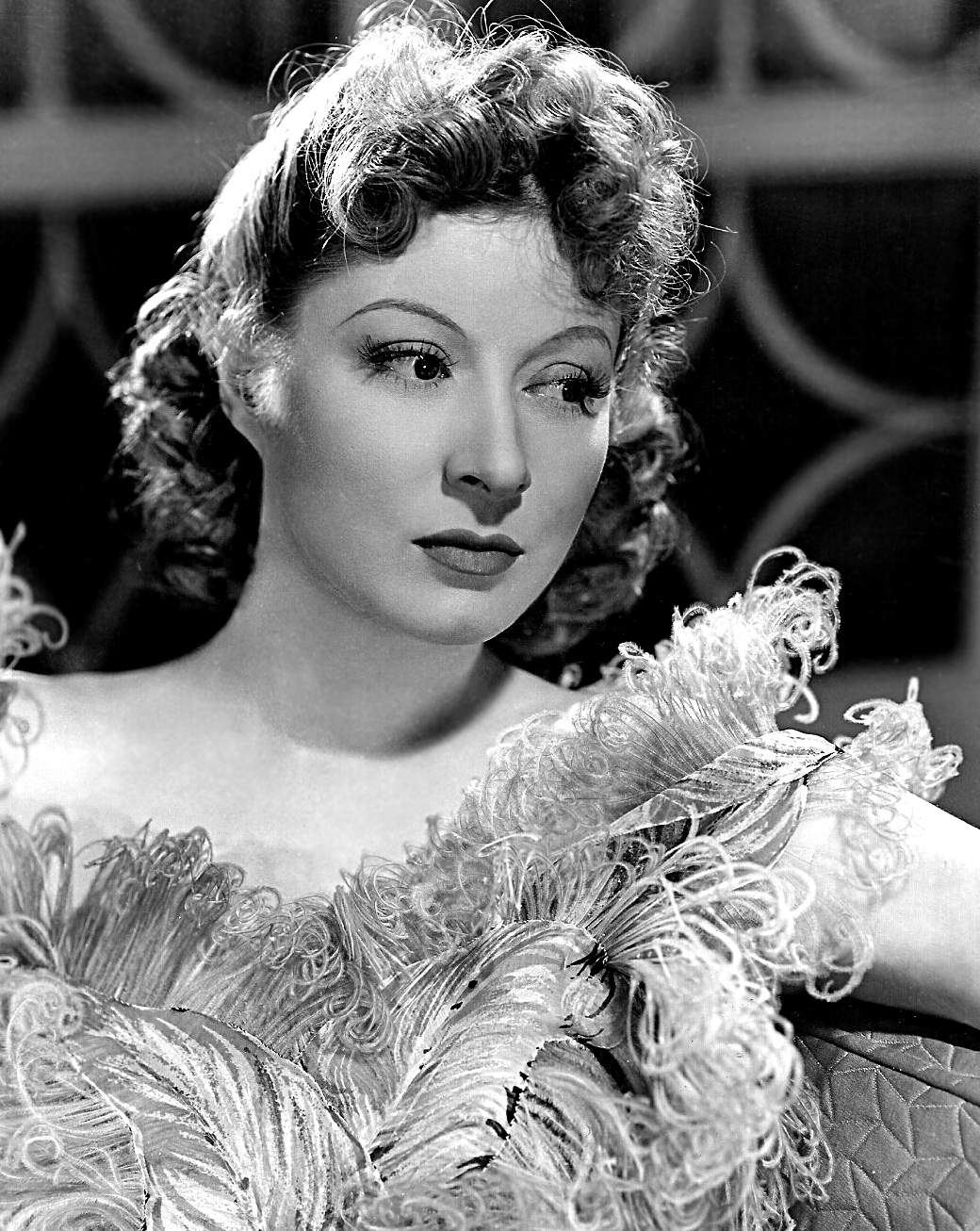
Greer Garson won for Sunrise at Campobello

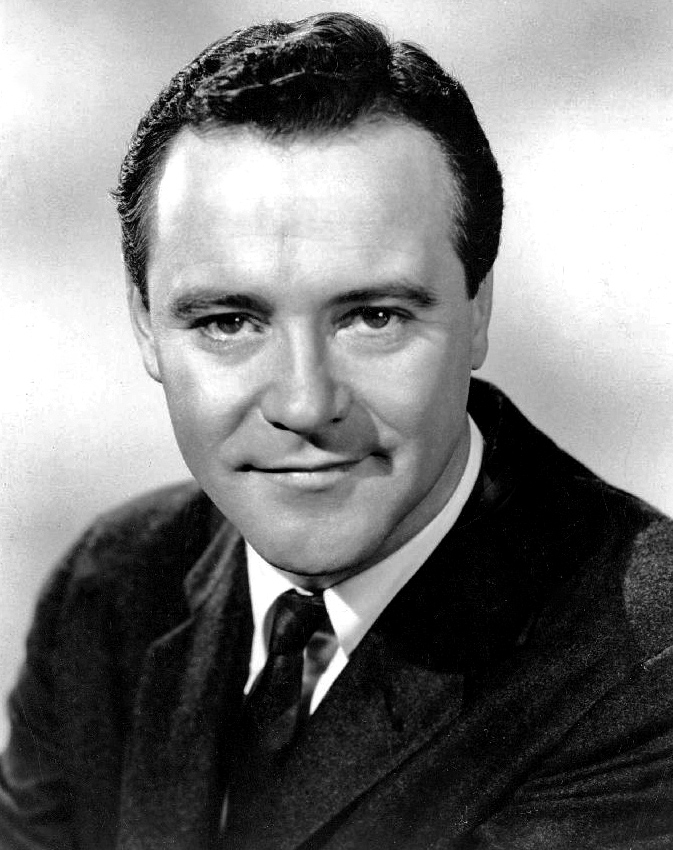
Jack Lemmon won for The Apartment

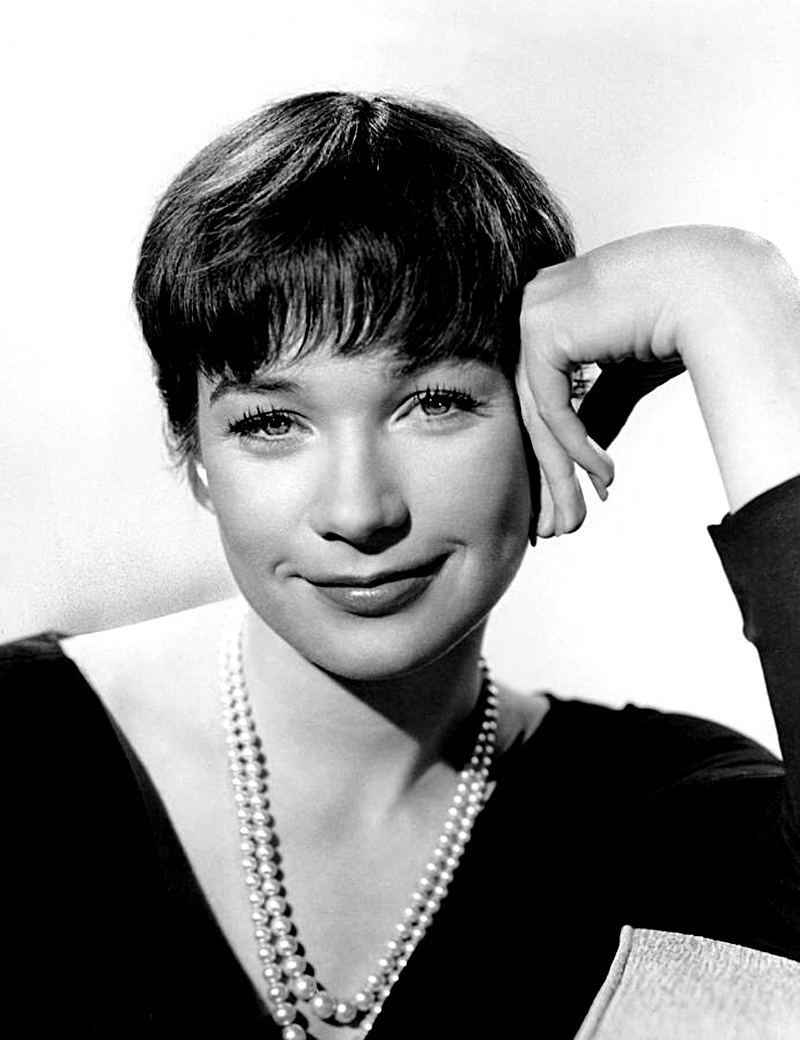
Shirley MacLaine won for The Apartment

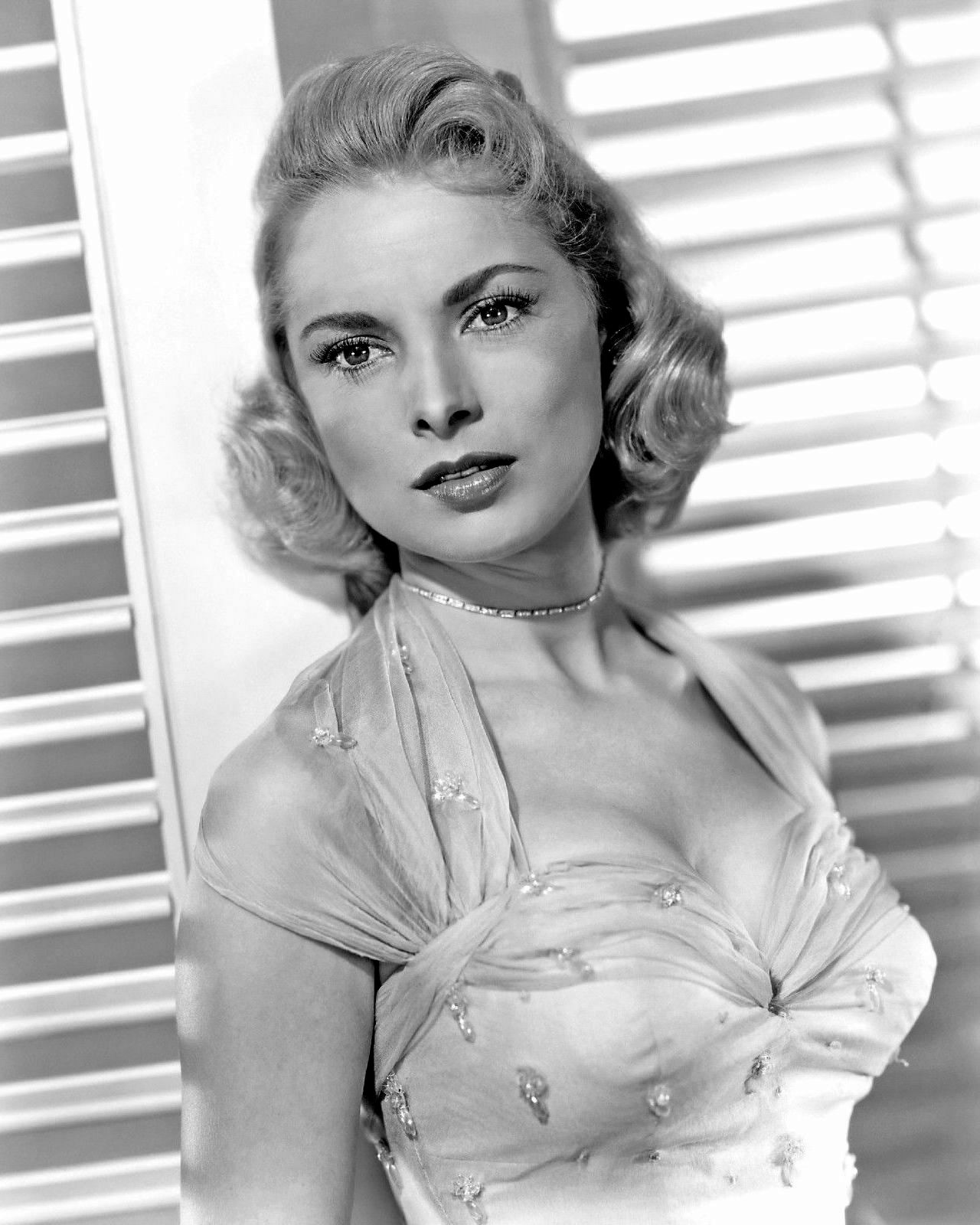
Janet Leigh won for Psycho

=== Film ===
Best Motion Picture
Best Motion Picture - Drama	Best Motion Picture - Comedy
Spartacus; Elmer Gantry; Inherit the Wind; Sons and Lovers; Sunrise at Campobello	The Apartment; The Facts of Life; The Grass Is Greener; It Started in Naples; Our Man in Havana
Best Performance in a Motion Picture – Drama
Actor	Actress
Burt Lancaster – Elmer Gantry; Trevor Howard – Sons and Lovers; Laurence Olivier – Spartacus; Dean Stockwell – Sons and Lovers; Spencer Tracy – Inherit the Wind	Greer Garson – Sunrise at Campobello; Doris Day – Midnight Lace; Nancy Kwan – The World of Suzie Wong; Jean Simmons – Elmer Gantry; Elizabeth Taylor – BUtterfield 8
Best Performance in a Motion Picture – Comedy or Musical
Actor	Actress
Jack Lemmon – The Apartment; Cantinflas – Pepe; Dirk Bogarde – Song Without End; Cary Grant – The Grass Is Greener; Bob Hope – The Facts of Life	Shirley MacLaine – The Apartment; Lucille Ball – The Facts of Life; Capucine – Song Without End; Judy Holliday – Bells Are Ringing; Sophia Loren – It Started in Naples
Best Supporting Performance in a Motion Picture – Drama, Comedy or Musical
Supporting Actor	Supporting Actress
Sal Mineo – Exodus; Lee Kinsolving – The Dark at the Top of the Stairs; Ray Stricklyn – The Plunderers; Woody Strode – Spartacus; Peter Ustinov – Spartacus	Janet Leigh – Psycho; Ina Balin – From the Terrace; Shirley Jones – Elmer Gantry; Shirley Knight – The Dark at the Top of the Stairs; Mary Ure – Sons and Lovers
Other
Best Director	Original Score
Jack Cardiff – Sons and Lovers; Richard Brooks – Elmer Gantry; Stanley Kubrick – Spartacus; Billy Wilder – The Apartment; Fred Zinnemann – The Sundowners	Dimitri Tiomkin – The Alamo; Ernest Gold – Exodus; Johnny Green – Pepe; Alex North – Spartacus; George Duning – The World of Suzie Wong
Best Motion Picture - Musical	Best Film to Promote International Understanding
Song Without End; Bells Are Ringing; Can-Can; Let's Make Love; Pepe	Hand in Hand; Conspiracy of Hearts
Most Promising Newcomer - Male	Most Promising Newcomer - Female
Michael Callan; Mark Damon; Brett Halsey; Peter Falk; David Janssen; Robert Vaughn	Ina Balin; Nancy Kwan; Hayley Mills; Jill Haworth; Shirley Knight; Julie Newmar

=== Special awards ===
Henrietta Award (World Film Favorite)

Tony Curtis
Rock Hudson
Gina Lollobrigida

Special Award

Cantinflas (For comedy)
Stanley Kramer (For artistic integrity)

Special Merit Award

The Sundowners

Samuel Goldwyn Award

The Trials of Oscar Wilde (English-Language Foreign Film)
La Vérité (France) (Foreign-Language Foreign Film)
The Virgin Spring (Sweden) (Foreign-Language Foreign Film)

- Pote tin Kyriaki (Greece)

=== Cecil B. DeMille Award ===
Fred Astaire
