= Tomb (album) =

Studio album by Angelo de Augustine
- Released: January 11, 2019
- Recorded: December 2017 – October 2018
- Studio: Reservoir Studios
- Genres: Alternative; indie; folk
- Length: 46:15
- Label: Asthmatic Kitty
- Producer: Thomas Bartlett

Angelo de Augustine chronology
Swim Inside the Moon (2017)	Tomb (2019)	A Beginner's Mind (2021)

Singles from Tomb
- 1. "Tomb" Released: November 13, 2018; 2. "Kaitlin" Released: December 4, 2018; 3. "Somewhere Far Way from Home" Released: December 17, 2018; 4. "You Needed Love, I Needed You" Released: January 8, 2019

Tomb is the third studio album by American musician Angelo de Augustine, released on Asthmatic Kitty on January 11, 2019. De Augustine collaborated with Thomas Bartlett on all 12 tracks. It is an alternative folk album about a breakup and its emotional fallout.

== Themes and influences ==
Most of the songs were written after a breakup de Augustine experienced at the end of 2017. The subsequent pain and loss is the principal theme of the album. He draws a comparison between the breakup and his father leaving home.

== Critical reception ==
Professional ratings
Aggregate scores
Source	Rating
AnyDecentMusic?	71/100
Metacritic	78/100
Review scores
Source	Rating
Exclaim!	4/5 stars
The Line of Best Fit	4/5 stars
Mojo	3/5 stars
Pitchfork	7.3/10
Q	4/5 stars
Paste	7.3/10
Sputnikmusic	4/5 stars
Under the Radar	4/5 stars
Uncut	4/5 stars

The album received generally positive reviews from critics. Writing for Under the Radar, Michael James Hall said that "(Tomb) is a remarkable, quietly powerful, and astoundingly beautiful album from an artist who now deserves to take his place among his influences". Margaret Farrell of Pitchfork proclaimed that "despite the album's dark, damp, sepulchral title, light manifests numerous times on Tomb. In the dizzying chime of his careful fingerpicking and high-pitched howls, De Augustine captures love's bright blaze". Writing for Exclaim!, Laura Stanley said that "while the title suggests De Augustine's third full-length album is full of sepulchral tones, Tomb has a lightness to it. De Augustine is immersed in love throughout, so while he's working through tough stuff, we are ultimately left with the feeling that De Augustine is growing stronger and that love will bloom again".

== Track listing ==
All tracks are written by Angelo de Augustine.

Tomb track listing
No.	Title	Length
1.	"Tomb"	4:18
2.	"All to the Wind"	2:52
3.	"You Needed Love, I Needed You"	3:25
4.	"I Could Be Wrong"	4:09
5.	"Tide"	5:15
6.	"Kaitlin"	3:51
7.	"Time"	3:56
8.	"Somewhere Far Away from Home"	3:07
9.	"Wanderer"	3:03
10.	"A Good Man's Light"	4:26
11.	"Bird Has Flown"	3:22
12.	"All Your Life"	4:25

== Personnel ==
Performance

- Angelo de Augustine – vocals, background vocals, bandurria, guitar, handclapping, piano, whistle, Wurlitzer piano, composer, paintings
- Thomas Bartlett – drum machine, snare drums, engineer, floor tom, handclapping, mixing, muted piano, piano, producer, synthesizer, Wurlitzer piano

Technical personnel

- Josh Bonati – mastering, master lacquer
