= Simon Oakland =

American actor (1915–1983)

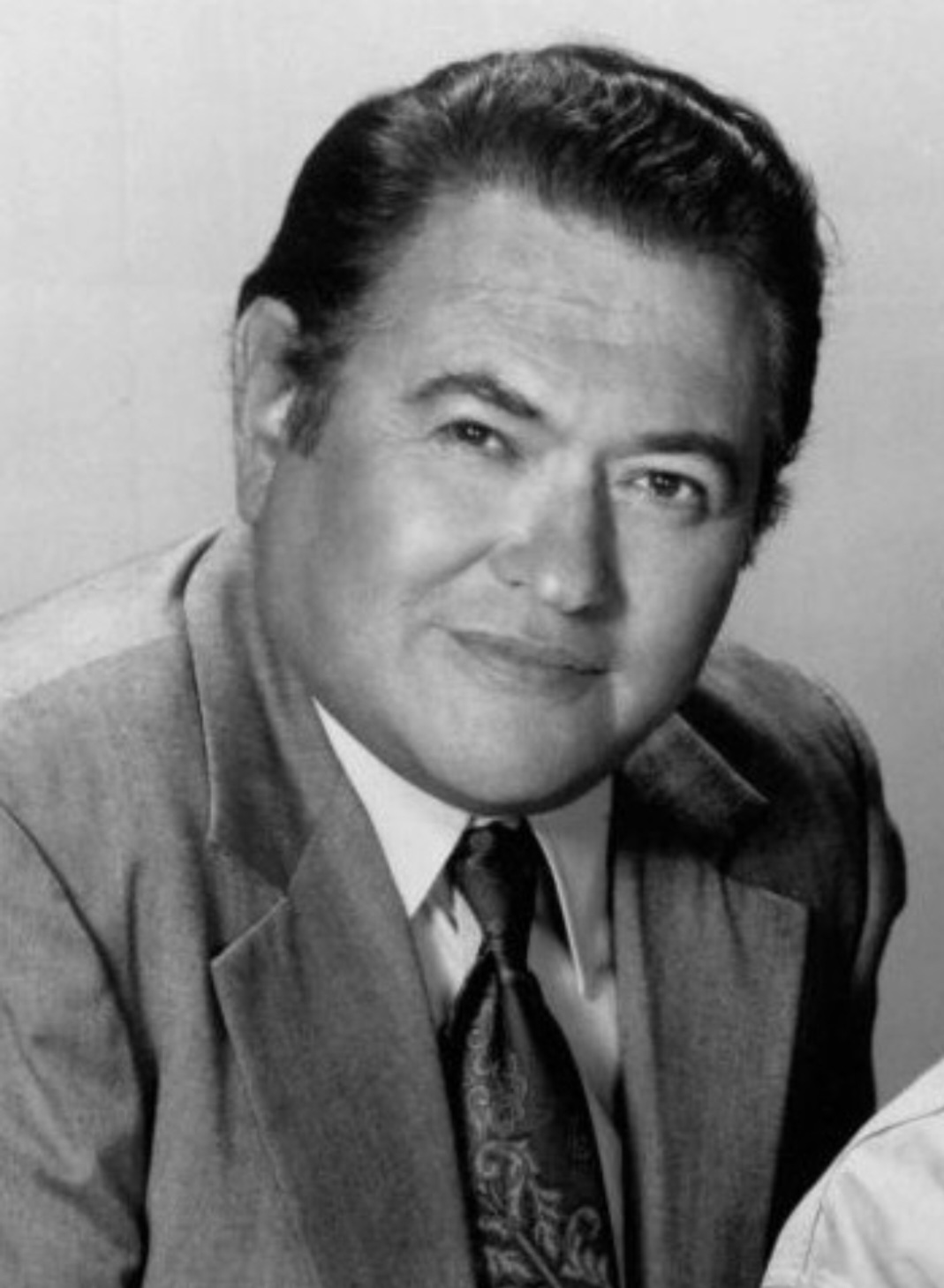
- Oakland as Inspector Spooner in Toma (1973)
- Born: Simon Weiss; August 28, 1915; Brooklyn, New York, U.S.
- Died: August 29, 1983 (aged 68); Cathedral City, California, U.S.
- Occupation: Actor
- Years active: 1951–1983
- Spouse: Lois Lorraine Porta (m. 1943)
- Children: 1

Simon Oakland (August 28, 1915 – August 29, 1983) was an American actor of stage, screen, and television.

During his career, Oakland performed primarily on television, appearing in over 130 series and made-for-television movies between 1951 and 1983. His most notable big-screen roles were in Psycho (1960), West Side Story (1961), The Sand Pebbles (1966), Bullitt (1968), The Hunting Party (1971), and Chato's Land (1972). On television, he was a regular on the cult classic horror series Kolchak: The Night Stalker (1974–1975), and the military drama Baa Baa Black Sheep (1976–1978).

== Early life and career ==
Oakland was born in Brooklyn, New York, the eldest of the three sons of immigrant Jewish parents, Jacob Weiss and Ethel Oaklander, born in Romania and the Russian Empire respectively. His father was a plasterer and builder. While he later claimed in media interviews to have been born in 1922 (a date repeated in his New York Times obituary), Social Security and vital records indicate he was born Simon Weiss in 1915; his stage name was derived from his mother's maiden name, Oaklander. (Note: Some primary sources suggest his birth name may have been Isidor Weiss. One source reported that his "real name" was Si Oaklander, but this is contradicted by the weight of evidence.)

He began his performing career as a musician (he was a violinist, an avocation he pursued during his entire career as an actor). Oakland began his acting career in the late 1940s. He enjoyed a series of Broadway hits, including Light Up the Sky, Skipper Next to God, The Shrike, and Inherit the Wind, and theater was one of his lasting passions. He was a concert violinist until the 1940s.

== Film and television ==
In 1955, Oakland made his film debut, albeit uncredited, as an Indiana state trooper in The Desperate Hours. He appeared in two films released in 1958: as Mavrayek in The Brothers Karamazov and as journalist Edward Montgomery in I Want to Live!

Oakland's notable performance in I Want to Live! led to his playing a long series of tough-guys, either as authority figures or villains or a mix of both. He appeared in Psycho as the psychiatrist who, at the end of the film, explains Norman Bates's multiple personality disorder. He appeared in the films West Side Story, The Sand Pebbles, and Bullitt.

He made two guest appearances as murder victims on CBS's Perry Mason. He appeared in the syndicated crime drama, Decoy, starring Beverly Garland. Oakland appeared once on the CBS Western Dundee and the Culhane and once on the series Sheriff of Cochise. He was also a regular, in a comedic supporting role, as General Thomas Moore, on NBC's Baa Baa Black Sheep, starring Robert Conrad. He appeared in two episodes of the original The Twilight Zone TV series (“The Rip Van Winkle Caper” and “The Thirty-Fathom Grave”) and in The Outer Limits as the alien birdman in "Second Chance". In 1974 and 1975, he was a series regular on Kolchak: The Night Stalker, playing newspaper editor Tony Vincenzo. (He had previously played the same character in two made-for-television movies.

During the 1970s, Oakland appeared in multiple episodes of The Rockford Files, three times as blustery private detective Vern St. Cloud, a nemesis/antagonist for Jim Rockford, as well as five single-character appearances on Hawaii Five-O from the first to the eighth season.

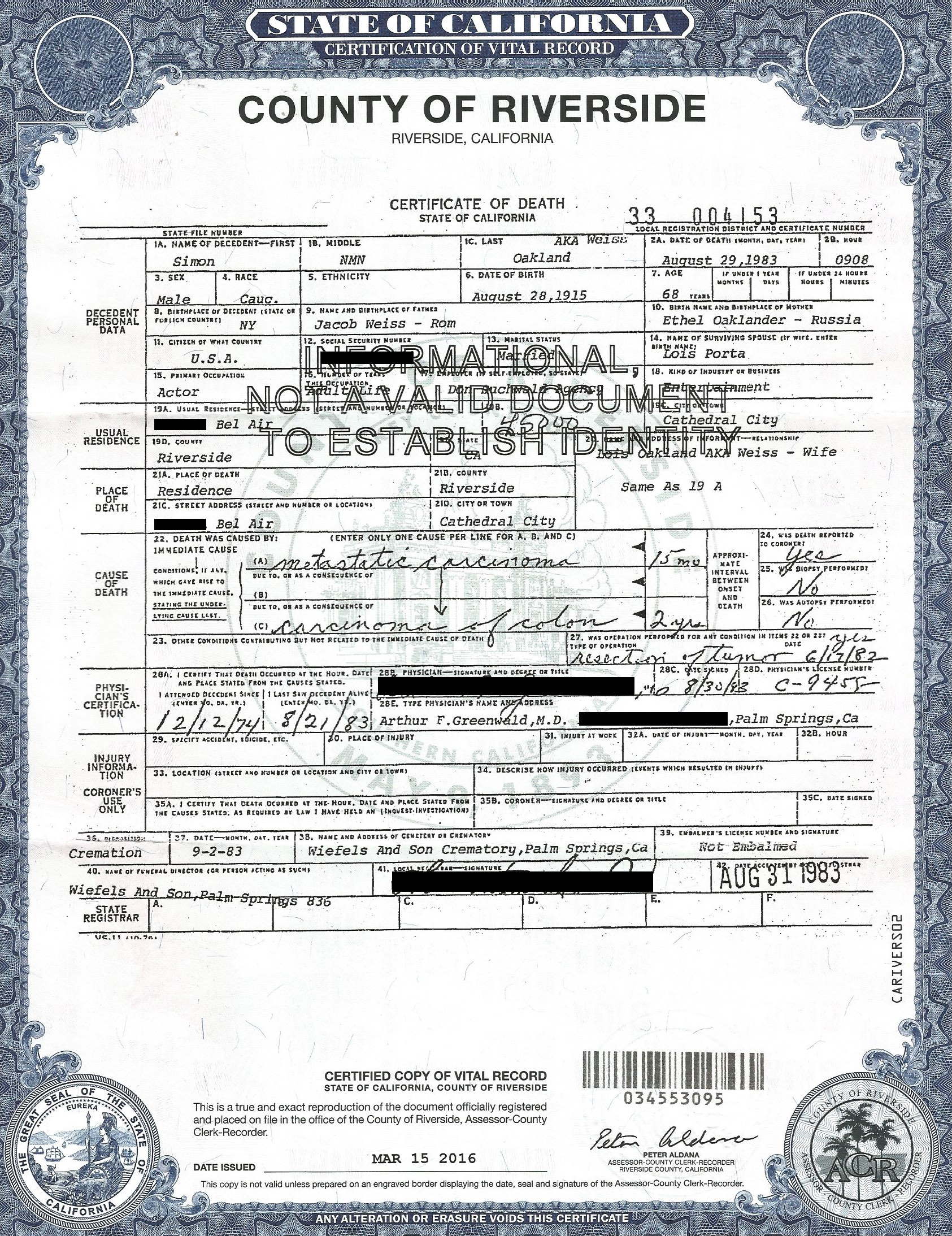
Death certificate of Simon Oakland

== Personal life ==
Oakland was married to Lois Lorraine Porta. The couple had one daughter, Barbara.

== Death ==
Oakland continued working up to the year of his death. His last credited acting appearance was in the episode "Living and Presumed Dead" on the CBS television series Tucker's Witch. That episode aired three months before Oakland's death from colon cancer in Cathedral City, California, on August 29, 1983, the day after his 68th birthday.

== TV and filmography ==
- The Desperate Hours (1955) as state trooper (uncredited)
- Gunsmoke (1956-1965, TV Series) as Carl Mandee / Miguel / Jim Nation / Enoch Mills
- The Sheriff of Cochise (1956, Episode: "Question of Honor", season 1) as Charlie Moon
- The Silent Service (1958, episode: "USS Cavalla: Lucky Lady's Famous First Patrol") as Captain Herman J. Kossler
- The Brothers Karamazov (1958) as Mavrayek
- I Want to Live! (1958) as Edward S. 'Ed' Montgomery
- Have Gun - Will Travel (1958, Episode: "The Statue of San Sebastian", season one) as Sancho Fernandez
- Adventures in Paradise (1959-1962, TV series) as Martin / John Briggs / Red Mulligan / and McGraw
- The Alaskans (1959, episode: "Doc Booker") as Doc Booker
- Men Into Space (1959, episode 13: "Quarantine") as Dr. Horton
- The Rise and Fall of Legs Diamond (1960) as Lieutenant Moody
- Perry Mason (1960-1961, TV series) as Captain Mike Caldwell / Howard Walters
- Laramie (1960, episode: "Ride or Die") as fugitive Vernon Kane
- Who Was That Lady? (1960) as Belka
- Psycho (1960) as Dr. Richmond, the psychiatrist who explains Norman Bates' case
- Murder Inc. (1960) as Detective Sergeant William Tobin
- The Twilight Zone (1961-1963, episodes: "The Rip Van Winkle Caper" and "The Thirty-Fathom Grave", the original series, hosted by Rod Serling) as De Cruz and Captain Beecham, respectively
- West Side Story (1961) as Schrank, a hard-boiled plainclothes police detective
- Route 66 (1962, episode: "To Walk With the Serpent") as Ben Newcombe
- Bus Stop (1962, episode: "Cry to Heaven") as Sergeant Brokaw
- Tales of Wells Fargo (1962, episode: "Portrait of Teresa") as Poderio
- Cain's Hundred (1962, episode: "The New Order") as Walter Hayes
- Follow That Dream (1962) as Nick
- Third of a Man (1962) as Doon
- Ben Casey (1962, episode: "When You See an Evil Man") as Jake
- Hemingway's Adventures of a Young Man (1962) as Joe Boulton
- Car 54, Where Are You? (1962, episode: "Hail to the Chief") as Secret Service Agent Cordner
- Wagon Train (1962, episode: "The Donna Fuller Story")
- The Untouchables (1962–1963, TV series) as Russ Bogan / Pete 'The Persuader' Kalmisky / Joe Palakopolous (Mr. Pal)
- Bonanza (1963-1969, TV series) as Judge Seth Tabor / Frank Scott / Mel Barnes / William Poole (three episodes)
- Combat! (1963-1965, TV series) as Sergeant Tom Akers / Private Clawson
- Stoney Burke (1963, episode: "Image of Glory") as Sam Hagen
- Rawhide (1963, episode: "Incident of the Travelin' Man") as Bolivar Jagger
- Wall of Noise (1963) as Johnny Papadakis
- My Favorite Martian (1963, season one, episode one: "My Favorite Martian") as Lieutenant Murphy
- The Raiders (1963) as Sgt. Austin Tremaine
- The Outer Limits (1964, episode: "Second Chance") as Empyrian
- Mr. Novak (1964, episode: "With a Hammer in His Hand, Lord, Lord!") as Carl Green
- Mr. Broadway (1964, episode: "Try to Find a Spy" with Barbara Feldon) as Shaw
- The Reporter (1964, in series finale "Vote for Murder") as Detective Lieutenant Gene Gordon
- Daniel Boone (1965-1969, TV series) as Bickford / General James Wilkerson / Dull Knife
- The Satan Bug (1965) as Tasserly
- Get Smart (1965) as Cowboy
- The Plainsman (1966) as Chief Black Kettle
- The Sand Pebbles (1966) as the sailor Stawski
- Mission: Impossible (1967, episode: "The Frame") as Jack Wellman
- Tony Rome (1967) as Rudy Kosterman
- Gentle Ben (1967-1969, TV Series) as Packy Benner
- Chubasco (1968) as Laurindo
- Hawaii Five-O (1968-1975, TV series) as Benny Kalua / Frank Epstein / Mauritany / Shako / Mendoza
- It Takes A Thief (1968, episode: "A Very Warm Reception") as Colonel Savrille
- Bullitt (1968) as Captain Sam Bennett
- The Wild Wild West (1968, episode: "The Night of the Fugitives") as Diamond Dave Desmond
- The Big Valley (1969, episode: "The Secret") as Adam Howard
- Ironside (1969-1973, TV series) as Mel Grayson / Theodore Berringer, Sr. / Elton Ferris
- On a Clear Day You Can See Forever (1970) as Dr. Conrad Fuller
- Scandalous John (1971) as Barton Whittaker
- The Hunting Party (1971) as Matthew Gunn
- The Night Stalker (1972) as Vincenzo
- Chato's Land (1972) as Jubal Hooker
- The Night Strangler (1973) as Tony Vincenzo
- Emperor of the North (1973) as Policeman
- Happy Mother's Day, Love George (1973) as Sheriff Roy
- The Starlost (1973, episode: "And Only Man Is Vile") as Dr. Asgard
- Toma (1973-1974, TV series) as Inspector Spooner
- Kolchak: The Night Stalker (1974-1975, TV series) as Tony Vincenzo
- Ellery Queen (1975, episode: "The Adventure of the Pharaoh's Curse") as Norris Wentworth
- Baa Baa Black Sheep (1976–1978, TV series) as Brigadier General Thomas Moore
- Gibbsville (1976, episode: "All the Young Girls", season one) as Chapman
- Kojak (1976, episode: "Dead Again") as security chief of a department store getting extorted
- The Feather and Father Gang (1977, episode: "The Big Frame", season one, episode 14) as Cosgrove
- David Cassidy: Man Undercover (1978–1979, TV series) as Sergeant Abrams / Lieutenant Abrams
- CHiPs (1979 episodes "Drive, Lady Drive", Pts I and II) as Bruno
- Evening in Byzantium (1978) as Walter Klein
- The Rockford Files (1977–1979, four episodes over three seasons) 3 as Vern St. Cloud / Beppy Conigliaro
- Charlie's Angels (1980, episode: "Angel's Child") as Sgt. Shanks (His character's name during the show was always spoken as "Cates", but in the credits it is listed as "Shanks").
- Quincy, M.E. (1978–1982, TV series) as U.S. Sen. Reeves / Keith Zagner / Chick Thomas / Sal Jarrett
- Vega$ (1981, Episode: "Set-Up") as private detective Eddie Miller.
- CHiPs (1982 episode "Alarmed") as Sweeny
- The Littlest Hobo (1982, episode: "Mail Order Bride", season three) as Tom Beecher
- Tucker's Witch (1983, episode: "Living and Presumed Dead", season one) as Daniel Gorman (final appearance)
