= The Bellero Shield =

- The Outer Limits episode
- Episode no.: Season 1 Episode 20
- Directed by: John Brahm
- Story by: Joseph Stefano; Lou Morheim
- Teleplay by: Joseph Stefano
- Based on: A story by Arthur Leo Zagat
- Cinematography by: Conrad Hall
- Production code: 23
- Original air date: February 10, 1964

Guest appearances
- Martin Landau; Sally Kellerman; Chita Rivera

Episode chronology
← Previous "The Invisibles"	Next → "The Children of Spider County"

"The Bellero Shield" is an episode of the original The Outer Limits television show. It first aired on February 10, 1964, during the first season. There are several similarities in the story's theme, plot, and structure to William Shakespeare's Macbeth, and many critics agree it was the series' take on that play.

== Opening narration ==
"There is a passion in the human heart which is called aspiration. It flares with the noble flame, and by its light Man has traveled from the caves of darkness to the darkness of outer space. But when this passion becomes lust, when its flame is fanned by greed and private hunger, then aspiration becomes ambition – by which sin the angels fell."

== Plot ==
A scientist, Richard Bellero, builds a powerful laser device that he shoots into the sky from a laboratory on the top floor of his home, but the invention is not practical enough to satisfy his demanding father, Richard Sr., who views his son as a failure and has made plans to hand control of the Bellero company to someone outside the family, to the great chagrin of Richard's ruthlessly ambitious wife Judith. One night after Richard has left the lab, a peaceful bioluminescent extraterrestrial from a world which "hovers just above the ceiling of your universe" rides the laser down to Earth. Judith tries to shoot the alien with a laser gun, but the alien protects himself by using a small device in his hand that instantly raises a powerful shield around him. Recognizing that this technology would bring her husband great acclaim and fortune, Judith gets Richard to leave the house by persuading him to go fetch his father. She then tries to coax the alien into giving her his shield's control device, but he disagrees, fearing his technology would fall into the wrong hands. Judith then tricks him into lowering his shield and shoots him, stealing his shield control device. Judith and her maid Mrs. Dane secretly drag the apparently dead alien's body to the cellar.

During a demonstration in front of Richard and his father, who do not know that the alien has been shot, Judith raises the shield, but is unable to take it down and becomes trapped inside it. Mrs. Dane, desperate to save Judith from death by asphyxiation, goes to the cellar and is startled to find the alien still alive but very weak. The maid begs him "Can you help?" The alien replies, "Can I not?" Just before dying, the alien lowers the shield by using his own glowing blood, the substance that powers the control device. Despite her being rescued, however, Judith insists that she is still trapped by the shield—the imagined shield, perhaps, of her own guilt over killing an alien who thought only of helping her. As the episode ends, she places her hands helplessly on the "shield" that is no longer there. On one hand is a spot: a glowing drop of the murdered alien's blood that presumably will stain her palm forever.

== Closing narration ==
"When this passion called aspiration becomes lust, then aspiration degenerates, becomes vulgar ambition, by which sin the angels fell."

== Interpretation ==
The most obvious parallels to Shakespeare's Macbeth lie in Judith's overweening and heartless ambition (similar to that of Lady Macbeth), both women's apparent madness by the end of their respective tales, and the "damn'd spot" that will not "out" from either woman's hand, a physical manifestation of their guilt. However, Judith's husband Richard shares none of Macbeth's brutality or desire for power. Northwestern University professor Jeffrey Sconce interprets the "shield" as a metaphor for television, a tool of "domestic asylum" that kept women of that era locked up within the home.

== Legacy ==
Skeptics have pointed to this episode as an origin for the grey aliens described in the 1961 Betty and Barney Hill abduction. In his 1990 article Entirely Unpredisposed, Martin Kottmeyer suggested that Barney's memories revealed under hypnosis might have been influenced by the episode, which was broadcast twelve days before Barney's first hypnotic session. Between the alleged 1961 abduction and the airing of the episode in 1964, Betty Hill's writings had described the aliens as short black-haired men with large "Jimmy Durante" noses. The episode featured an extraterrestrial with large eyes who says, "In all the universes, in all the unities beyond the universes, all who have eyes have eyes that speak." The report from the regression featured a scenario that was in some respects similar to the television show. In part, Kottmeyer wrote:

"Wraparound eyes are an extreme rarity in science fiction films. I know of only one instance. They appeared on the alien of an episode of an old TV series The Outer Limits entitled "The Bellero Shield". A person familiar with Barney's sketch in "The Interrupted Journey" and the sketch done in collaboration with the artist David Baker will find a "frisson" of "déjà vu" creeping up his spine when seeing this episode. The resemblance is much abetted by an absence of ears, hair, and nose on both aliens. Could it be by chance? Consider this: Barney first described and drew the wraparound eyes during the hypnosis session dated 22 February 1964. "The Bellero Shield" was first broadcast on 10 February 1964. Only twelve days separate the two instances. If the identification is admitted, the commonness of wraparound eyes in the abduction literature falls to cultural forces."

When a different researcher asked Betty about The Outer Limits, she insisted she had "never heard of it".

Despite Kottmeyer's writing that "wraparound eyes are an extreme rarity in science fiction," exaggeratedly large slanted eyes and a bald head are also features of the "monster" in the following week's episode, "The Children of Spider County," which aired only five days before Barney Hill's hypnosis session.

== Cast ==
- Martin Landau – as Richard Bellero
- Sally Kellerman – as Judith Bellero
- Chita Rivera – as Mrs. Dane
- John Hoyt – as Bifrost Alien
- Neil Hamilton – as Richard Bellero, Sr.
