= Spirals of Silence =

Studio album by Angelo De Augustine
- Released: November 18, 2014
- Recorded: January – August 2014
- Genre: Alternative; indie; folk
- Length: 34:00
- Label: Independent
- Producer: Angelo De Augustine

Angelo De Augustine chronology
| Spirals of Silence (2014) | Swim Inside the Moon (2017) |

Singles from Spirals of Silence
- 1. "How Past Begins" Released: 2015

Spirals of Silence is the debut studio album by American musician Angelo De Augustine.

== Critical reception ==
Professional ratings
Review scores
| Source | Rating |
|---|---|
| Austin Town Hall | 4/5 stars |
| Monkeybuzz | 9/10 stars |

Roger Valença of Monkeybuzz said that "the eleven tracks that add up to just over half an hour compose a delicate and emotional experience, very quiet, which will make fans of the “voice and guitar” genre very happy". Writing for Austin Town Hall, Nathan Lankfork praised the record: "I encourage you to do your own exploration of the record, as each time I spin it, I find something different and new lurking in the background, or even in front of my face. It’s a record that’ll make you lost, looking for the key to its secrets, and in the end, it’s just a nice bit of songwriting".

== Track listing ==
All tracks are written by Angelo de Augustine.

Spirals of Silence track listing
| No. | Title | Length |
|---|---|---|
| 1. | "Old Hope" | 1:58 |
| 2. | "Collections" | 2:22 |
| 3. | "I Spend Days" | 2:45 |
| 4. | "The Beginning" | 3:33 |
| 5. | "Married Mother" | 3:44 |
| 6. | "Clay Dad" | 2:44 |
| 7. | "You Open to the Idea" | 2:33 |
| 8. | "How Past Begins" | 4:37 |
| 9. | "Please Know That I'll Be Around" | 3:47 |
| 10. | "Tucked in at Home" | 3:39 |
| 11. | "It's a Life" | 2:13 |

== Personnel ==
Performance

- Angelo De Augustine – vocals
