= Second Chance (The Outer Limits) =

- The Outer Limits episode
- Episode no.: Season 1 Episode 23
- Directed by: Paul Stanley
- Story by: Lin Dane
- Teleplay by: Lin Dane; Lou Morheim
- Cinematography by: Kenneth Peach
- Production code: 27
- Original air date: March 2, 1964

Guest appearances
- Simon Oakland; Janet De Gore; Don Gordon

Episode chronology
← Previous "Specimen: Unknown"	Next → "Moonstone"

"Second Chance" is an episode of the original The Outer Limits television show. It first aired on March 2, 1964, during the first season.

== Opening narration ==
When fear is too terrible, when reality is too agonizing, we seek escape in manufactured danger, in the thrills and pleasures of pretending-in the amusement parks of our unamusing world. Here, in frantic pretending, Man finds escape and temporary peace, and goes home tired enough to sleep a short, deep sleep. But what happens here when night comes? When pretending ends, and reality begins?

== Plot ==
Frustrated and disillusioned physicist Dave Crowell has found a temporary and undemanding job - 'piloting' a flying saucer mock-up spaceflight simulator at a third-rate amusement park - to escape from his former Defense Department employers' demands to develop more effective weapons of mass destruction. However, an alien from the planet Empyria stealthily modifies the attraction into an actual interplanetary spacecraft; and, passing himself off as a weird roving sideshow, invites aboard a group of misfits, each of whom is refusing to confront unpleasant realities in his/her life. The Empyrian offers the group a second chance to better themselves - an opportunity to colonize a small planetoid called Tythra that, paradoxically, will threaten both the alien's home world and Earth, just 82 years down the line; by inhabiting it, the colonists will alter its orbital path and thus avert the disaster. However, to turn this dream into a reality, each must overcome an entrenched unwillingness to face his or her own true nature to pull together as a group. As violence escalates quickly between the distressed abductees and the flight crew, with one passenger accidentally being ejected into space during a physical altercation, Crowell eventually manages to convince the Empyrian that the operation is doomed to failure; he explains that it is against human nature to expect someone to freely accept their shortcomings and admit their failures. Instead, he advises him to seek help directly from Earth's governments and scientists, in order to initialize a proper collaboration for the sake of each individual, by asking for volunteers to accompany them to Tythra - he assures the alien that he would probably have a whole ship full of people willing to receive a second chance at life. Approving of Crowell's choice, the Empyrian states that "he trusts his judgment", reversing the course of the ship to return the reluctant abductees back to Earth.

== Closing narration ==
This episode has no closing narration.

== Background ==
The original script for this episode was written by Sonya Roberts (whose previous credits included episodes of Surfside Six, Hawaiian Eye, and 77 Sunset Strip) and titled "Joy Ride", and takes place at Jollyland (changed to Joyland). The script was rewritten as "Second Chance" by Lou Morheim, who retained the basic plot but threw out most of the emotional depth and humor of the characters, supposedly because ABC wanted monsters and simplistic stories. In "Second Chance", for example, the Empyrian frightens whoever he encounters by suddenly appearing in front of them, whereas in "Joy Ride" Roberts cleverly has him appear as if he is part of the park, wearing a sandwich board that reads 'GREETINGS EARTHMEN, I AM FROM THE PLANET EMPYRIA IN OUTER SPACE'. Likewise, in "Second Chance", the Empyrian forces Arjay to buckle his safety belt by hypnotizing him with his alien medallion, but in "Joy Ride" he achieves this by getting Arjay to "pretend" everything is for real, pulling out his ray gun and threatening to burn him to a cinder if he doesn't, and Arjay, playing along, complies laughing. Believing the resulting script to be inane, Sonya Roberts had her name removed from the script and employed the pseudonym Lin Dane.

The exterior of the Braniff Space Rover attraction at Freedomland U.S.A. reportedly was used as a reference for the exterior of the flying saucer in this episode. In one scene, two actors are seen outside the flying saucer in a park with a carousel in the distance. While Freedomland's Space Rover may have served as a reference for the flying saucer in the episode, the scene provides evidence that the episode was not actually filmed at Freedomland.

== Cast ==
- Simon Oakland – as Emperian
- Don Gordon – as Dave Crowell
- Janet De Gore – as Mara Matthews
- John McLiam – as R.J. Beasley
- Angela Clarke – as Sue Ann Beasley
- Yale Summers – as Buddy Lyman
- Arnold Merritt – as Tommy "Nebs" Shadbury
- Mimsy Farmer – as Donise Ward
