= Philip Abbott =

American actor (1924–1998)

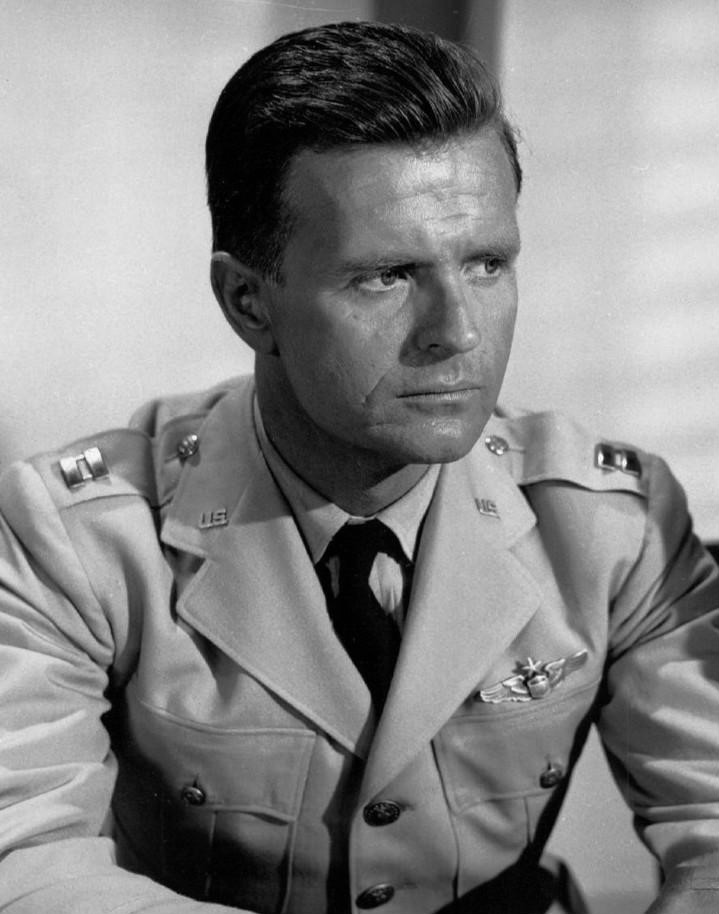
- Abbott in Steve Canyon (1958)
- Born: Philip Abbott Alexander; March 20, 1924; Lincoln, Nebraska, U.S.
- Died: February 23, 1998 (aged 73); Tarzana, California, U.S.
- Resting place: San Fernando Mission Cemetery, Los Angeles, California, U.S.
- Education: Fordham University
- Occupation: Actor
- Years active: 1952–1998
- Spouse: Jane Dufrayne (m. 1950–1998)

Philip Abbott (March 20, 1924 – February 23, 1998) was an American character actor. He appeared in several films and numerous television series, including a lead role as Arthur Ward in the crime series The F.B.I.

== Early life ==
A native of Lincoln, Nebraska, Abbott attended Fordham University in New York City, and later studied acting at the Pasadena Playhouse. He served in the United States Army during World War II.

== Career ==
Abbott was a secondary lead in several films of the 1950s and 1960s, including Miracle of the White Stallions (1963).

He made more than one hundred guest appearances on various television series from 1952 to 1995, including NBC's Justice about the Legal Aid Society of New York and The Eleventh Hour, a medical drama about psychiatry. He appeared on the CBS anthology series Appointment with Adventure and The Lloyd Bridges Show. He made two guest appearances on Perry Mason: in 1961 he played journalist Edmond Aitken in "The Case of the Envious Editor," and in 1965 he played Harry Grant in "The Case of the Wrongful Writ." He guest starred on Jack Lord's ABC series, Stoney Burke, and in Dennis Weaver's NBC sitcom, Kentucky Jones, in the episode "The Music Kids Make". In 1986, he portrayed Grant Stevens in the daytime soap The Young and the Restless.

Abbott is best remembered as Assistant Director Arthur Ward on the ABC series, The F.B.I., with Efrem Zimbalist Jr., in the starring role as Inspector Lewis Erskine.

== Death ==
Abbott died in 1998 of cancer in Tarzana, California, aged 73, and is interred at San Fernando Mission Cemetery in Los Angeles.

== Filmography ==
=== Film ===
- The Bachelor Party (1957) as Arnold Craig (film debut)
- The Invisible Boy (1957) as Dr. Tom Merrinoe, head of Stoneman Institute of Mathematics.
- Sweet Bird of Youth (1962) as Dr. George Scudder
- The Spiral Road (1962) as Frolick
- Miracle of the White Stallions (1963) as Colonel Reed
- Those Calloways (1965) as Dell Fraser
- Tail Gunner Joe (1977, TV movie) as Senator Scott W. Lucas
- Hangar 18 (1980) as Frank Morrison
- Savannah Smiles (1982) as Chief Pruitt
- The First Power (1990) as Cardinal
- Pumpkin Man (1998, TV Short) as Grandpa
- Starry Night (1999) as Dr. Ruby (final film role)

=== Television ===
- Schlitz Playhouse of Stars, episode Make Way for Teddy (1952)
- You Are There, episode The Signing of the Declaration of Independence (July 4, 1776) (1953)
- The Man Behind the Badge, episode The Case of the Strategic Air Command (1954)
- Producers' Showcase, 2 episodes Dateline (1954) & Yellow Jack (1955)
- Alfred Hitchcock Presents (1956) (Season 1 Episode 28: "Portrait of Jocelyn") as Mark Halliday
- Steve Canyon (1958) as Captain Peterson in episode "Fear of Flying"
- One Step Beyond, as Paul Burton in episode The Dead Part of the House (1959)
- Diagnosis: Unknown as Peter Loper in Final Performance (1960)
- Hotel de Paree, as Gilmer in episode Sundance and the Man in the Shadows (1960)
- The Twilight Zone, episodes Long Distance Call (1961) and The Parallel (1963)
- Bus Stop, as Oliver West in episode A Lion Walks Among Us (1961)
- The Detectives Starring Robert Taylor, as Phil Norden in episode The Airtight Case (1961)
- The Defenders, as Dr. Bill Conrad in Quality of Mercy (1961)
- Cain's Hundred, 2 episodes (1961-1962)
- Saints and Sinners, as Paul Graham in A Night of Horns and Bells (1962)
- Target: The Corruptors, as Carl Benham in episode Babes in Wall Street (1962)
- Stoney Burke, as Royce Hamilton in The Contender (1962)
- The Lloyd Bridges Show, as Dr. Olsen in episode My Child Is Yet a Stranger (1962)
- Checkmate, as Lawrence Dresher in episode Trial by Midnight (1962)
- Ben Casey, 2 episodes (1962-1963)
- Dr. Kildare, as Dr. David Key in episode A Hand Held Out in Darkness (1963)
- G.E. True, as Chuck Fowler in episode O.S.I. (1963)
- The Outer Limits as Lincoln Russell in The Borderland (1963)
- Empire, as Sid Keller in episode The Tiger Inside (1963)
- 77 Sunset Strip, as Tom Carlyle in episode Never to Have Loved (1963)
- Bonanza, as James Callan in episode The Toy Soldier (1963)
- Nightmare in Chicago, as Myron Ellis
- Mr. Broadway, as Geoffrey Karr in Sticks and Stones May Break My Bones (1964)
- Slattery's People, as Harry Colby in episode Question: What Is Honor?... What Is Death? (1964)
- The F.B.I., (1965–1974)
- Walt Disney's Wonderful World of Color, as Ed Barrett in 4-part episode Kilroy (1965)
- Kentucky Jones, as Sam Clifton in episode The Music Kids Make (1965)
- Insight, 3 episodes (1967-1976)
- The Bionic Woman, as Dr. Kelso in episode Escape to Love (1977)
- The Incredible Hulk, as Dr. Murrow in episode The Quiet Room (1979)
- The Outer Limits, as Prof. Benedict O. Fields in Season One, Episode 18 ZZZZZ (1964)
- Perry Mason, as Edmond Aitken in Season Four, Episode 13, The Case of the Envious Editor (1961), as Harry Grant in Season 8, Episode 29 The Case of the Wrongful Writ (1965)
- Highway to Heaven, as Mr. Drake in Season Two, Episode 6, "Birds of a Feather" (1985)
- Naked City (1961) (Episode 22: "A Memory of Crying") as Doctor
