= Specimen: Unknown =

- The Outer Limits episode
- Episode no.: Season 1 Episode 22
- Directed by: Gerd Oswald
- Written by: Stephen Lord
- Cinematography by: Conrad Hall
- Production code: 10
- Original air date: February 24, 1964

Guest appearances
- Stephen McNally; Richard Jaeckel; Gail Kobe; Russell Johnson; Arthur Batanides; Peter Baldwin; John Kellogg; Dabney Coleman; Walt Davis; Bob Johnson

Episode chronology
← Previous "The Children of Spider County"	Next → "Second Chance"

"Specimen: Unknown" is an episode of the original The Outer Limits television show. It first aired on February 24, 1964, during the first season.

== Introduction ==
The crew of the Adonis research space station discovers an unusual object attached to the station wall and brings it inside to study it.

== Opening narration ==
For centuries, Man has looked to the skies and sought to uncover the mystery of the universe. The telescope brought into focus the craters on the Moon and the canals on Mars, but it was limited, and Man's insistent hunger for knowledge and experience would not be satisfied until he broke the massive chains of gravity and set foot himself on a planet other than his own. Project Mercury was his first venture into space — a testament to his technical ingenuity and courage, a green light to a hundred other projects which would take him still further. This is Project Adonis, a laboratory orbiting a thousand miles above the Earth, a tiny, far-flung world connected only by radio and memory, and inhabited by a handful of men dedicated to removing the unknown for future space travelers. At ten minutes after six on January 8th, Lieutenant Rupert Howard stumbled upon something clinging to the wall of the space-lock that appeared alive. He called them "space barnacles" for temporary identification. They were not.

== Plot ==
Lt. Howard, a member of a team of astronaut-researchers, finds strange mushroom-shaped organisms clinging to the wall of the space lock, calling them "space barnacles". Exposed to light and air inside, one exhibits aggressive growth and develops a beautiful flower. During study of the organism under the microscope following the spewing of large spores, the flower emits a noxious gas that incapacitates Howard, after which he dies. After burying Howard in space, the other astronauts begin a scheduled return to Earth, bringing the new species with them, not knowing that it caused Howard's death. Containers with the specimens inadvertently open during hard maneuvering, and start rapidly multiplying and filling the shuttle with deadly gas, forcing the crew to don space suits. Learning of the potential danger to life, their superiors on Earth order the crew to remain in orbit until a method can be found to eliminate the threat posed by the specimen. As the spacecraft runs out of fuel, the half-dead crew is ordered to land. They crash some distance from the rocket base, and a team of scientists and military personnel race to rescue the astronauts and contain the organisms. The incapacitated astronauts are evacuated, but the organisms begin to sow upon the surrounding countryside. The commanding officer and an astronaut's wife are forced to flee on foot when their vehicle becomes overgrown, but are completely surrounded by the organisms. As all hope for survival begins to fade, a thunderstorm appears and drenches the land. Unexpectedly, the rain causes the flowers to wilt and die, and the earth is saved.

== Closing narration ==
There are many things up there, evil and hungry, awesome and splendid. And gentle things, too. Merciful things...like rain.

== Production ==
Interiors were shot on Stage #4 at KTTV and the exterior shots were filmed in the Tarzan forest portion of M.G.M. Backlot #3. The shooting notes specify "extra foliage" to hide the World War II barges from the Combat! series in the lake over the hillside from where the full-sized Adonis shuttle exterior mock-up, built by art director Jack Poplin and his team, is situated, nose-first into the ground. Projects Unlimited made 150 prop plants for these scenes, some of which were working models which fired aerosol mist and spores (in fact Puffed Wheat breakfast cereal) which were sculpted by Johnny Neopolitano. The mock-up of the Adonis shuttle was painted black and re-used in the Twilight Zone episode "Probe 7, Over and Out".

The model of the Adonis space station was a leftover prop from the Ziv/UA TV series Men into Space.

When the episode was assembled, it ran only 45 minutes. To extend the film, shots of the Adonis model hanging in space were lengthened, and in the first part of the show they cut to the model shot as often as possible. Tediously slow slow-motion was given to the shots of Mike Doweling's EVA to repair the Adonis shuttle, which gave it a few more seconds. Leslie Stevens quickly wrote a prologue (directed by the first assistant director Robert Justman) which featured Lt. Rupert Lawrence Howard (played by Dabney Coleman), previously only mentioned in the past tense by the other characters, and Joseph Stefano wrote an unusually long Control Voice Speech which spelled out the history of the space program, even giving the exact time and date of the prologue. The opening teaser showcasing the 'bear' lasts nearly three minutes, all of which got the episode to the required running time. Originally the episode opened with the burial in space of Lt. Rupert Howard and the plants were not revealed to be menacing until they killed a lab rabbit much later in the show; now they are seen killing Lt. Howard in the prologue, suspense dispelled by the need for padding.

This was the highest Nielsen-rated episode in the first season.

== Cast ==
- Stephen McNally – as Colonel J.T. MacWilliams
- Richard Jaeckel – as Captain Mike Doweling
- Gail Kobe – as Janet Doweling
- Russell Johnson – as Major Clark Benedict
- Arthur Batanides – as Lt. Ken Galvin
- Peter Baldwin – as Lt. Gordon Halper
- John Kellogg – as Major Nathan Jennings
- Dabney Coleman – as Lt. Rupert Lawrence Howard (uncredited)
- Walt Davis – as Sergeant (uncredited)
- Robert Johnson – as Project Adonis Intercom voice (uncredited)
