= A Beginner's Mind =

Studio album by Sufjan Stevens and Angelo De Augustine
- Released: September 24, 2021
- Genre: Indie folk; chamber folk
- Length: 45:27
- Label: Asthmatic Kitty
- Producer: Angelo De Augustine; Sufjan Stevens

Sufjan Stevens chronology
Convocations (2021)	A Beginner's Mind (2021)	Reflections (2023)

Angelo De Augustine chronology
Tomb (2019)	A Beginner's Mind (2021)	Toil and Trouble (2023)

Singles from A Beginner's Mind
- 1. "Reach Out" / "Olympus" Released: July 7, 2021; 2. "Back to Oz" / "Fictional California" Released: August 10, 2021; 3. "Cimmerian Shade" / "You Give Death a Bad Name" Released: September 8, 2021

A Beginner's Mind is a collaborative album by American musicians Sufjan Stevens and Angelo De Augustine. The album was released by Asthmatic Kitty on September 24, 2021. After being teased by Asthmatic Kitty for several days, the album was formally announced on July 7, 2021, along with its track listing and two singles, "Reach Out" and "Olympus". Daniel Anum Jasper created the album's cover artwork.

The album was met with widespread acclaim from music critics.

== Background ==
A Beginner’s Mind was created in a cabin in upstate New York. There, Stevens and Augustine watched movies every day for inspiration, with every song on the album being loosely inspired by a different film.

== Critical reception ==
Professional ratings
Aggregate scores
Source	Rating
AnyDecentMusic?	8.0/10
Metacritic	81/100
Review scores
Source	Rating
AllMusic	3.5/5 stars
Evening Standard	4/5 stars
Exclaim!	8/10
The Independent	4/5 stars
The Irish Times	5/5 stars
Loud and Quiet	8/10
Pitchfork	6.7/10
The Sydney Morning Herald	4.5/5 stars
Uncut	8/10
Under the Radar	8.5/10

The album received widespread acclaim from critics. At Metacritic, which assigns a normalized rating out of 100 to reviews from professional publications, the album received an average score of 81, based on 11 reviews, indicating "universal acclaim". Aggregator AnyDecentMusic? gave the album a 8.0 out of 10, based on their assessment of the critical consensus.

In the review for AllMusic, critic Mark Demming felt that the album was "intelligent and well-crafted, and will appeal to fans of either Stevens' or De Augustine's recent work" but also that it was "less distinct than the music they create on their own."

== Track listing ==
All tracks are written by Sufjan Stevens and Angelo De Augustine, except where noted.

A Beginner's Mind track listing
No.	Title	Writer(s)	Film inspiration	Length
1.	"Reach Out"		Wings of Desire	3:43
2.	"Lady Macbeth in Chains"		All About Eve	3:42
3.	"Back to Oz"		Return to Oz	4:12
4.	"The Pillar of Souls"		Hellraiser III: Hell on Earth	3:10
5.	"You Give Death a Bad Name"		Night of the Living Dead	4:07
6.	"Beginner's Mind"	De Augustine	Point Break	2:15
7.	"Olympus"		Clash of the Titans	3:07
8.	"Murder and Crime"		Mad Max	3:30
9.	"(This Is) The Thing"	Stevens	The Thing	2:48
10.	"It's Your Own Body and Mind"	Stevens	She's Gotta Have It	2:27
11.	"Lost in the World"	De Augustine	The Last Wave	3:10
12.	"Fictional California"		Bring It On Again	2:50
13.	"Cimmerian Shade"		The Silence of the Lambs	4:19
14.	"Lacrimae"	De Augustine	Lacrimae Rerum	2:07
Total length:				45:27

List of films taken from Asthmatic Kitty's Instagram page.

== Personnel ==
- Angelo De Augustine & Sufjan Stevens – production, mixing, recording, arrangement, vocals, bass, bells, cymbals, drums, guitar, piano, synthesizer, tambourine, ukulele, whistle, Wurlitzer
- Josh Bonati – mastering
- Daniel Anum Jasper – artwork

== Charts ==
Chart performance for A Beginner's Mind
Chart (2021)	Peak position
Belgian Albums (Ultratop Flanders)	78
German Albums (Offizielle Top 100)	45
Swiss Albums (Schweizer Hitparade)	77
Scottish Albums (OCC)	18
UK Albums (OCC)	91
UK Independent Albums (OCC)	8
US Billboard 200	115
US Americana/Folk Albums (Billboard)	5
US Independent Albums (Billboard)	13
US Top Alternative Albums (Billboard)	12
US Top Rock Albums (Billboard)	17
