= ZZZZZ =

- The Outer Limits episode
- Episode no.: Season 1 Episode 18
- Directed by: John Brahm
- Written by: Meyer Dolinsky
- Cinematography by: Conrad Hall
- Production code: 21
- Original air date: January 27, 1964

Guest appearances
- Philip Abbott; Marsha Hunt; Joanna Frank

Episode chronology
← Previous "Don't Open Till Doomsday"	Next → "The Invisibles"

"ZZZZZ" is an episode of the original The Outer Limits television show. It first aired on January 27, 1964, during the first season. In the episode, a queen bee takes on human form, and plans to mate with a human male. Regina the queen bee is played by Joanna Frank, while the male entomologist is played by Philip Abbott.

== Opening narration ==
Human life strives ceaselessly to perfect itself, to gain ascendancy. But what of the lower forms of life? Is it not possible that they, too, are conducting experiments and are at this moment on the threshold of deadly success?

== Plot ==
Ben Fields, married to Francesca Fields, is an entomologist seeking a lab assistant. Regina, a giant mutant queen bee in human form, who is searching for a human mate to evolve her species, takes the job. Regina is accepted into their household after fabricating a story of accused infidelity by her 'former' employer's spouse, whom she chose to keep anonymous to prevent anyone from knowing about the alleged affair. When the subject of drones comes up, Regina is oddly enthusiastic about the beauty of the bee's mating ritual and the willingness of the drones to die in the process. Suspicious of her background, while being treated with disrespect and contempt by Regina, Francesca discovers Regina has lied; as well as seeing her abruptly transforming into a giant bee while apparently drawing nectar from a flower in their garden. At one point, due to the metabolic changes while in human form, Regina experiences spasms of pain, and is examined and treated by the Fields' personal physician, who reveals to them his belief that Regina may not be who she appears to be. Later, with her knowledge of Regina's attempts to seduce her husband, Francesca confronts her, whereupon Regina unleashes the bees of her hive kept in Ben's laboratory, attacking and then stinging Francesca to death. Ben, grief-stricken, accuses Regina of murdering his wife. Now understanding and horrified by her true identity and purpose, he forcefully rejects her advances, and gives her his view of the human mating ritual, in contrast to her earlier statements. In an ensuing struggle, she falls from his bedroom's second story balcony to the ground below. She is not killed, but transforms back into a queen bee, then flies off.

== Closing narration ==
When the yearning to gain ascendancy takes the form of a soulless, loveless struggle, the contest must end in unlovely defeat. For without love, drones can never be men, and men can only be drones.

== Production ==
"ZZZZZ" was shot entirely on a massive interior set, including the two-story mockup of Ben's house and the full garden constructed by Jack Poplin and his team on Soundstage#4 at KTTV.

== Cast ==
- Philip Abbott – as Ben Fields
- Joanna Frank – as Regina
- Marsha Hunt – as Francesca Fields
- Booth Colman – as Doctor Warren
- John Elizalde – as voice of Bees (uncredited)
- Robert Johnson – as voice of Mr. Lund (uncredited)
