= The Explosive Generation =

1961 film by Buzz Kulik

- Theatrical release poster
- Directed by: Buzz Kulik
- Written by: Joseph Landon
- Produced by: Stanley Colbert
- Starring: William Shatner; Patty McCormack; Lee Kinsolving; Billy Gray; Virginia Field; Steve Dunne
- Cinematography: Floyd Crosby
- Edited by: Melvin Shapiro
- Music by: Hal Borne
- Production company: Vega Productions
- Distributed by: United Artists
- Release date: October 1961
- Running time: 89 minutes
- Country: United States
- Language: English

The Explosive Generation (also known as The Chalk Circle, Arena, The Arena, Circle of Chalk and Bold Generation) is a 1961 American film directed by Buzz Kulik and starring William Shatner and Patty McCormack. It was written by Stanley Colbert.

== Plot ==
Peter Gifford is a teacher who wants to teach high school students to think for themselves and express themselves. A female student pushes to have open classroom discussion about the physical and emotional issues associated with teenage relationships and sex. This issue gets blown out of proportion by parents who don't have the facts and jump to ill-informed conclusions, demanding sanctions against the mostly innocent teacher, who keeps still on the matter to protect the involved students. The entire student body rallies in a Gandhiesque silent protest that helps everyone learn to appreciate the truth of the matter.

== Cast ==
- William Shatner as Peter Gifford
- Patty McCormack as Janet Sommers
- Lee Kinsolving as Dan Carlyle
- Virginia Field as Mrs. Katie Sommers
- Billy Gray as Bobby Herman Jr.
- Steve Dunne as Bobby Herman Sr.
- Phillip Terry as Mr. Carlyle
- Arch Johnson as Mr. George Sommers
- Edward Platt as Mr. Morton
- Beau Bridges as Mark
- Stafford Repp as Police Captain
- Vito Scotti as Custodian
- Jocelyn Brando as Mrs. Ryker (uncredited)
- David Geffen as student (uncredited)

== Reception ==
Variety wrote: "This is a well-written, carefully considered and capably-filmed study of American youth which avoids the sensational aspects of Hollywood's similar pix. ... Canadian actor William Shatner doesn't have a large role as the teacher, but he registers sympathetically and effectively. He has a pleasant screen personality and brings a moving power of oratory to his short speech about students 'protecting all over the world'."

Boxoffice wrote: "To the current rash of photoplays dealing with the subject of parental and professorial supervision – or the lack thereof – of adolescents is added this praiseworthy independent venture which should prove financially successful if for no other reason than it affords the young 'uns opportunity to indulge in a bit of I-told-you-so-ing. Earlier entries in the above-mentioned cycle have pursued either the comic or serious approach. Herein the latter obtains, although there are occasional sequences of levity."

The Monthly Film Bulletin wrote: "For the most part the direction (by Buzz Kulik, another recruit from television) manages to avoid the sensationalism implied in the title, but is otherwise not very distinguished. The acting is fair. Cuts presumably explain the enigmatic behaviour of Marge, who evidently suffers a traumatic experience in the beach hut (sub-Antonioni shot of her staring gloomily out to sea), and who subsequently appears once or twice, still under the weather, but having lost in the meantime her connection with the film."

== See also ==
- List of American films of 1961
