= Moonstone (The Outer Limits) =

- The Outer Limits episode
- Episode no.: Season 1 Episode 24
- Directed by: Robert Florey
- Story by: Lou Morheim; Joseph Stefano
- Teleplay by: William Bast
- Cinematography by: John M. Nickolaus
- Production code: 13
- Original air date: March 9, 1964

Guest appearances
- Ruth Roman; Alex Nicol; Tim O'Connor; Hari Rhodes

Episode chronology
← Previous "Second Chance"	Next → "The Mutant"

"Moonstone" is an episode of the original The Outer Limits television show. It first aired on March 9, 1964, during the first season.

== Opening narration ==
In Man's conquest of space, his own moon must be the first to surrender. From there he will step his way across the heavens to the edge of infinity. Each step will be as uncertain as the last, yet each will bring him closer to ultimate truth. Lunar Expedition One: Here a handful of brave scientists and technicians pave the way to the future. Their mission: to collect information that will eventually enable Man to inhabit the Moon; to use the Moon as a springboard to the stars. Once during each twenty-four-hour period, a force of three, commanded by General Lee Stocker and including Lieutenant Travers and Major Clint Anderson, makes its slow, uncharted way across the lunar surface, a surface whose depths and desires are, as yet, unprobed…

== Plot ==
Scientists and researchers in a base on the Moon discover living creatures encased in a seamless, perfectly round orb, which proves to be the repository of a benevolent alien intelligence that is fleeing tyranny in its own system. The beings inform the startled scientists that they are the five greatest minds in the universe, having escaped their home planet, Grippia, located in the constellation Xenes, to prevent their advanced knowledge from being used to conquer the galaxy. They had landed on the Moon due to a lack of sustainable energy, with the Sun being too weak to provide them with enough power to continue their flight. The scientists offer the aliens sanctuary while they attempt to re-energize; and, in exchange, they begin to record their combined wisdom on the base's computers to preserve it before they are captured. When the Tyrants arrive in pursuit, the researchers have to decide how much they should risk in the gathering of knowledge. The Grippians convince the scientists to release them to the Tyrants to prevent their imminent destruction, following the death of one of the researchers when trying to defend them. This act of compassion and sacrifice, in the face of almost certain death, is demonstrated as the Grippians self-destruct before they can be taken aboard the Tyrants' craft, thus denying them the knowledge they were so desperately seeking.

== Closing narration ==
The steps Man takes across the heavens of his universe are as uncertain as those steps he takes across the rooms of his own life. And yet if he walks with an open mind, those steps must lead him eventually to that most perfect of all destinations, truth.

== Quotes ==
"Their power is too great...their madness, even greater".

"If you are ever to destroy evil, you must survive to fight it".

"In the end, it is usually the good mind who enables evil to thrive".

"You did what you had to do...perhaps, that is the most subtle definition of bravery".

Stocker: "We didn't earn your thanks". Grippians: "The mind learns by doing...the heart learns by trying".

== Production ==
The Lunar landscape exterior was constructed by Jack Poplin and his team on Soundstage #2 at KTTV and the Moon backdrops were from M.G.M. The jagged mountains and rock columns were placed so as to hide the gaps in these backdrops. The Moon surface itself was a four inch deep layer of sand that had been dyed different colours to give the moonscape different gradations of tone when filmed in black and white. Paintings by astronomical artist Chesley Bonestell were used as background plates for sequences of the two Moonstones moving over the lunar surface.

The Grippians were designed at Projects Unlimited by father and son team Marcel and Victor Delgado. The eyes of the Grippians were dressed-up ping pong balls held on sticks with added tendrils, and the models were filmed inside a water tank so that their 'hair' would drift about as they swayed and moved. The Grippian sphere itself was one of the milky oversized Beverly Hills street lamppost globes, and cries of "Bring on the Street lamp" greeted the prop during filming.

William Bast's original script contained many spectacular action scenes, most of which were either simplified or not done at all for logistical and budgetary reasons.

== Cast ==
- Ruth Roman – as Prof. Diana Brice
- Tim O'Connor – as Major Clint Anderson
- Alex Nicol – as General Lee Stocker
- Curt Conway – as Dr. Philip Mendl
- Hari Rhodes – as Lt. Ernie Travers
- Vic Perrin – as the voice of the Scanner Unit (uncredited)
- Ben Wright – as the voice of the Grippians (uncredited)
