= The UFO Incident =

1975 television film

- A newspaper clip about the film shortly upon its release.
- Genre: Biography; Drama; History; Romance
- Based on: The Interrupted Journey: Two Lost Hours "Aboard a Flying Saucer" by John G. Fuller
- Teleplay by: Hesper Anderson; Jake Justiz
- Directed by: Richard A. Colla
- Starring: James Earl Jones; Estelle Parsons
- Music by: Billy Goldenberg

Production
- Executive producer: Richard A. Colla
- Producer: Joe L. Cramer
- Production locations: Universal Studios - 100 Universal City Plaza, Universal City, California
- Cinematography: Rexford L. Metz
- Editor: Richard Bracken
- Running time: 98 minutes
- Production company: Universal Television

Original release
- Network: NBC
- Release: October 20, 1975

The UFO Incident is a 1975 American made-for-television biographical film starring James Earl Jones and Estelle Parsons based on the alleged 1961 alien abduction of Barney and Betty Hill.

== Plot ==
The film introduces Barney and Betty Hill, two ordinary people who have had the most extraordinary experience. Barney is a postman and Betty is a social worker. They are an interracial couple who are very happy with each other, but they are perplexed by a traumatic experience of which they have no memory.

Two years later, they are still tormented by what happened during a trip where they have a mysterious lapse of memory after seeing a UFO hover over their car. They wake up from a strange daze after hearing an odd beeping sound further down the road.

Barney and Betty consult psychiatrist Doctor Benjamin Simon, who tries to help them find the answer. The doctor decides that the best treatment to unlock their case of double amnesia is hypnosis. Doctor Simon mentions that Barney has suffered from a childhood of racial strife and feels deep guilt about his divorce. Barney tells the doctor that he has had physical symptoms after the experience such as strange warts on his groin. Betty is being tormented by mysterious nightmares that she begins to document.

They report the incident to the US Air Force (the US Air Force at the time had a project relating to UFO sightings called Project Blue Book).

Doctor Simon places Barney under hypnosis and he begins to relive the experience. Barney describes him and Betty seeing a strange object in the sky that begins to follow and then to terrify them. Barney starts screaming in horror during the session as he mentions noticing grey aliens inside the UFO. Betty also reacts with horror describing their captive experience. She and Barney are subjected to disturbing medical experiments by the aliens, such as Betty having a needle shoved into her navel.

With Doctor Simon's assistance and their strong love for each other, Barney and Betty are able to come to terms with their experience and continue with their lives.

At the end of the film, it is revealed that Barney died of a stroke in 1969 at the age of 46. Betty lived until 2004.

== Main cast ==
- James Earl Jones as Barney Hill
- Estelle Parsons as Betty Hill
- Barnard Hughes as Dr. Benjamin Simon
- Dick O'Neill as Gen. James Davison
- Beeson Carroll as Lt. Col. Jack MacRainey
- Terrence O'Conner as Lisa MacRainey
- Jeanne Joe as "Examiner"
- Lou Wagner as "The Leader"

== Releases ==
The UFO Incident did not have an official home video release until June 21, 2022 when Kino Lorber Studio Classics released a 2K remaster of the film on Blu-ray (Region A), including bonus features such as a commentary by filmmaker and historian Gary Gerani, a documentary about the film's music composer Billy Goldenberg, and optional English subtitles (SDH).

== Possible remake ==
In 2011, The Huffington Post reported that a more developed and detailed film depicting the events of the Hill couple's alleged encounter and abduction was being pursued as a possible project which could give a better insight about the incident. The film was to be based on the book Captured! The Betty and Barney Hill UFO Experience (2007) by Stanton Friedman and Kathleen Marden.

== Historic context ==
The film aired on October 20, 1975, about 2 weeks before the Travis Walton UFO incident of November 5, 1975, leading cognitive psychologist Susan Clancy to argue that this film influenced Travis Walton to present his own alleged abduction story.
