= Toil and Trouble =

Studio album by Angelo De Augustine
- Released: June 30, 2023
- Recorded: 2020–2023
- Genre: 38:13
- Label: Asthmatic Kitty
- Producer: Angelo De Augustine

Angelo De Augustine chronology
A Beginner's Mind (2021)	Toil and Trouble (2023)

Singles from Toil and Trouble
- 1. "Another Universe" Released: April 25, 2023; 2. "The Ballad of Betty and Barney Hill" Released: May 24, 2023; 3. "Toil and Trouble" Released: June 13, 2023

Toil and Trouble is the fourth album by American musician Angelo De Augustine. It was released on June 30, 2023, through Asthmatic Kitty.

== Background ==
De Augustine started working on the album in 2020. He would spend the next three years working alone and trying to explore the extent of his imagination. The album was written, arranged, recorded, produced and mixed entirely by the musician himself, using 27 different instruments. According to De Augustine, the album stems from "thinking about the madness of the world" at the time and "how overwhelming" it can be. He further explained that he had to detach himself from reality in order to understand it, citing a "counter-world" to gain more knowledge.

The lead single "Another Universe", a "delicate indie folk" song, features a clay animation music video by Owen Summers. Picking up the concept of reality, De Augustine clarified that he was tired of it and decided to create a "safe world of his own". Released as the third single, the title-track of the album features a music video that visualizes the album cover. To the director Clara Murray, it signifies a "sorcery seemingly both wicked and holy" witnessing the birth of "mystical creatures". A song to ponder the "existence of consciousness", De Augustine begs the questions "who the mind is working for" as well as who is the person "pulling the strings and transmitting the messages".

== Critical reception ==
Robin Murray of Clash thought the album was "another dream-like sojourn into unfettered creativity". Michael Major at BroadwayWorld called it his "most visionary work yet", "revealing his profound capacity to alchemize pain into extraordinary beauty".

== Track listing ==
All lyrics are written by Angelo De Augustine; all music is composed by De Augustine.

Toil and Trouble track listing
No.	Title	Length
1.	"Home Town"	3:10
2.	"The Ballad of Betty and Barney Hill"	3:16
3.	"Memory Palace"	4:01
4.	"Healing Waters"	1:22
5.	"The Painter"	3:11
6.	"I Don't Want to Live, I Don't Want to Die"	4:21
7.	"Another Universe"	2:42
8.	"Song of the Siren"	3:14
9.	"Blood Red Thorn"	3:33
10.	"Naked Blade"	3:32
11.	"D.W.O.M.M."	3:28
12.	"Toil and Trouble"	2:23
Total length:		38:13
