= USS Mullinnix =

1957 Forrest Sherman-class destroyer

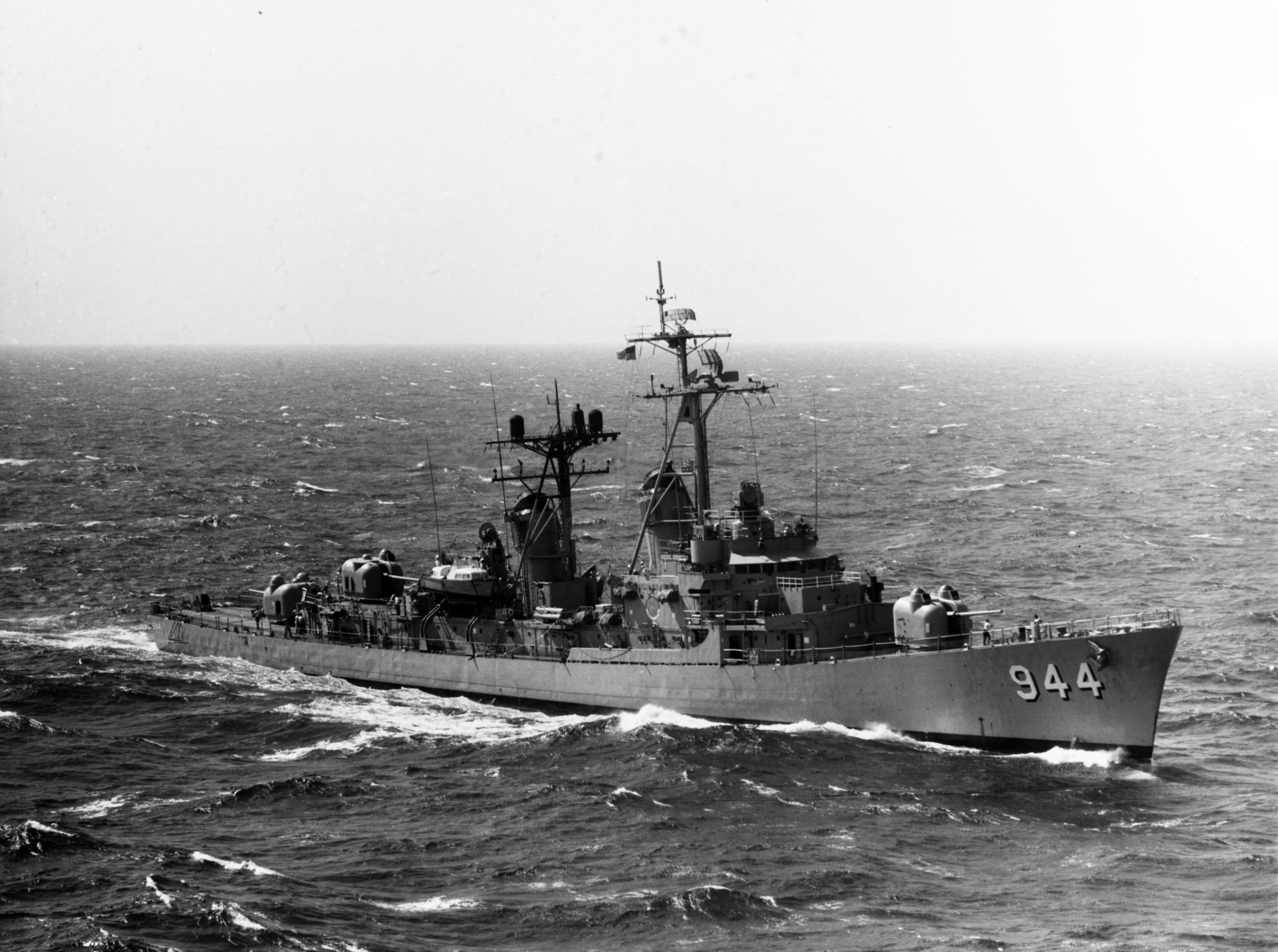
- USS Mullinnix in 1970

History

United States
- Name: Mullinnix
- Namesake: Henry M. Mullinnix
- Ordered: 23 October 1954
- Builder: Bethlehem Steel, Fore River Shipyard
- Laid down: 5 April 1956
- Launched: 18 March 1957
- Acquired: 26 February 1958
- Commissioned: 7 March 1958
- Decommissioned: 11 August 1983
- Stricken: 26 July 1990
- Fate: Sunk as a target, 22 August 1992

General characteristics
- Class & type: Forrest Sherman-class destroyer
- Displacement: 2,800 tons standard, 4,050 tons full load
- Length: 407 ft (124 m) waterline, 418 ft (127 m) overall.
- Beam: 45 ft (14 m)
- Draft: 22 ft (6.7 m)
- Propulsion: 4 × 1,200 psi (8.3 MPa) Foster-Wheeler boilers, Westinghouse steam turbines; 70,000 shp (52,000 kW); 2 × shafts.
- Speed: 32.5 knots (60.2 km/h; 37.4 mph)
- Range: 4,500 nautical miles (8,300 km); at 20 knots (37 km/h)
- Complement: 15 officers, 218 enlisted.
- Armament: 3 × 5 in (127 mm)/54 calibre dual purpose Mk 42 guns; 4 × 3 in (76 mm)/50 calibre Mark 33 anti-aircraft guns; 2 × Mark 10/11 Hedgehogs; 6 × 12.75 in (324 mm) Mark 32 torpedo tubes.

USS Mullinnix (DD-944) was a Forrest Sherman-class destroyer of the United States Navy. She was named for Admiral Henry M. Mullinnix USN (1892–1943), who was killed in action during World War II, when the aircraft carrier USS Liscome Bay was torpedoed by the Japanese submarine I-175 and sank southwest of Butaritari Island on 24 November 1943.

Mullinnix was built by the Bethlehem Steel Corporation's Fore River Shipyard in Quincy, Massachusetts, and launched by Mrs. Kathryn F. Mullinnix.

Mullinnix conducted patrol duty in the Caribbean during the Cuban Missile Crisis in 1962, participated in the Gemini program recovery operations in March 1966, and served as plane guard for aircraft carriers on Yankee Station in the Tonkin Gulf, participated in Sea Dragon operations, patrolled on search and rescue duties, and carried out naval gunfire support missions during the Vietnam War.

Mullinix and her sister ship Edson appeared in The Twilight Zone episode "The Thirty-Fathom Grave."
