= Swim Inside the Moon =

Studio album by Angelo De Augustine
- Released: August 25, 2017
- Recorded: November 2016 – April 2017
- Genre: Indie; folk
- Length: 27:58
- Label: Asthmatic Kitty
- Producer: Angelo De Augustine

Angelo De Augustine chronology
Spirals of Silence (2014)	Swim Inside the Moon (2017)	Tomb (2019)

Singles from Swim Inside the Moon
- 1. "Truly Gone" Released: April 26, 2017; 2. "Crazy, Stoned and Gone" Released: May 22, 2017; 3. "Haze" Released: July 27, 2017

Swim Inside the Moon is the second studio album by American musician Angelo De Augustine, released on Asthmatic Kitty on August 25, 2017.

== Track listing ==
All tracks are written by Angelo De Augustine.

Tomb track listing
No.	Title	Length
1.	"Truly Gone"	3:26
2.	"Haze"	3:21
3.	"More Than You Thought to Use"	2:44
4.	"Crazy, Stoned and Gone"	2:41
5.	"Fade"	3:34
6.	"On My Way Home"	4:54
7.	"I'll Wait for the Others"	2:41
8.	"Dreaming of the Moon"	2:08
9.	"I Hope That All of Your Dreams Come True"	2:24
Total length:		27:58

== Critical reception ==
Professional ratings
Aggregate scores
Source	Rating
Metacritic	81/100
Review scores
Source	Rating
Exclaim!	3.5/5 stars
The Line of Best Fit	4/5 stars
Mojo	4/5 stars
Uncut	4/5 stars

In a positive review, Peter Edwards from The Line of Best Fit said that "(Swim Inside the Moon) is a warning shot, a sign of things to come. This is just the beginning for Angelo De Augustine – an artist full of potential. Simon Ellman of Exclaim! wrote that "it's clear this record is intended to be far more relaxing than revolutionary. If hippie-ish comfort is what you seek, take a Swim Inside the Moon".

== Personnel ==
- Angelo De Augustine – vocals, producer
