= The Thirty-Fathom Grave =

- The Twilight Zone episode
- Episode no.: Season 4 Episode 2
- Directed by: Perry Lafferty
- Written by: Rod Serling
- Production code: 4857
- Original air date: January 10, 1963

Guest appearances
- Mike Kellin; Simon Oakland; David Sheiner; John Considine; Bill Bixby; Conlan Carter

Episode chronology
← Previous "In His Image"	Next → "Valley of the Shadow"
- The Twilight Zone (1959 TV series) (season 4)

"The Thirty Fathom Grave" is episode 104 of the American television anthology series The Twilight Zone. It originally aired on January 10, 1963 on CBS. In this naval-themed episode, the crew of a Navy destroyer hear a mysterious rhythmic noise coming from a sunken submarine.

== Opening narration ==
Incident one hundred miles off the coast of Guadalcanal. Time: the present. The United States naval destroyer on what has been a most uneventful cruise. In a moment, they're going to send a man down thirty fathoms and check on a noise maker – someone or something tapping on metal. You may or may not read the results in a naval report, because Captain Beecham and his crew have just set a course that will lead this ship and everyone on it into the Twilight Zone.

== Plot ==
In April 1963, a U.S. Navy destroyer is on a routine patrol off Guadalcanal when sonar picks up a sound beneath the waves; the crew believe that it sounds like something banging on metal.

They discover a submarine on the ocean floor, but inquiries to naval command reveal no recent sinkings in the area. A joking suggestion from some of the crew that the sub may be haunted sends an anxious and bewildered Chief Boatswain's Mate Bell, who has been feeling unwell for a couple of days, into a frenzy of bizarre behavior, including fainting spells. The destroyer's commander, Captain Beecham, orders the ship's diver, McClure, to investigate. They find out that it is an American submarine, and the metal sound is coming from inside. When McClure bangs on the submarine hull, the metal banging seemingly responds. Chief Bell begins to see apparitions of dead sailors beckoning him. The ship's doctor unsuccessfully tries to convince Bell that he is just having nightmares, and reports to the captain that Bell is experiencing effects of psychological trauma which could be caused by his wartime experiences. The doctor finds a pile of seaweed in the spot where Bell saw the apparitions.

McClure later discovers the number of the submarine, "714", which Beecham identifies as belonging to a submarine that was sunk during the First Battle of the Solomon Sea in early August 1942, almost twenty years ago.^{1} Although stunned at the idea that someone inside the submarine could still be alive, Beecham asks Pacific Fleet command for an emergency-priority rescue operation, giving the location as 09 degrees 30 minutes south latitude and 160 degrees 48 minutes east longitude. McClure goes down again to try to ascertain exactly where the sound is coming from, to help the rescue outfit determine where to enter the boat. The diver receives no response to his bangs on the hull, but he finds a dog tag which he delivers to Beecham. It belongs to Chief Bell.

When Beecham shows the dog tag to Bell, he recounts that he was a signalman on a submarine during the war. He dropped a signal light while attempting to change the infrared filter at night, causing the filter to fall off. As a result, Japanese destroyers saw the light and attacked. Bell was blown into the water by the shelling. The captain ordered a dive, but depth charges sank the boat. Bell, the sole survivor, was later rescued by an American destroyer. Bell tells Beecham that he now understands: his dead shipmates know he is above them right now and are demanding that he join them. Bell is overcome by survivor guilt, and says, "I sunk that sub. I'm responsible." Despite Captain Beecham's efforts to convince Bell that his mistake did nothing, that a boat caught on the surface and surrounded by enemy ships was already doomed, Bell dons the dog tag, races out on deck and jumps overboard, shouting, "They're calling muster on me!" The destroyer's crew are unable to save Bell or find his body.

Later, McClure accompanies the rescue mission into the submarine. Upon returning to the ship, he reports to Beecham that the boat was a wreck inside, and no one was left alive. Inside the control room, he found the periscope shears cut in half, with one section swinging back and forth. When Beecham asks him to confirm that this was the clanging noise they had heard, McClure agrees, but adds that he also saw the remains of eight dead sailors; one was holding a hammer in his hand.

== Closing narration ==
Small naval engagement, the month of April, 1963. Not to be found in any historical annals. Look for this one filed under "H" for haunting in the Twilight Zone.

== Cast ==
- Mike Kellin as Chief Boatswain's Mate Bell
- Simon Oakland as Captain Beecham
- David Sheiner as Chief Doctor "Doc" Matthews
- John Considine as McClure
- Bill Bixby as OOD Smith
- Conlan Carter as Ensign Marmer
- Forrest Compton as ASW Officer
- Henry Scott as Jr. OOD
- Anthony Call as Lee Helmsman
- Charles Kuenstle as Sonar Operator
- Derrik Lewis as Helmsman
- Louie Elias as Crewman
- Vincent Baggetta as Crewman

== Production notes ==
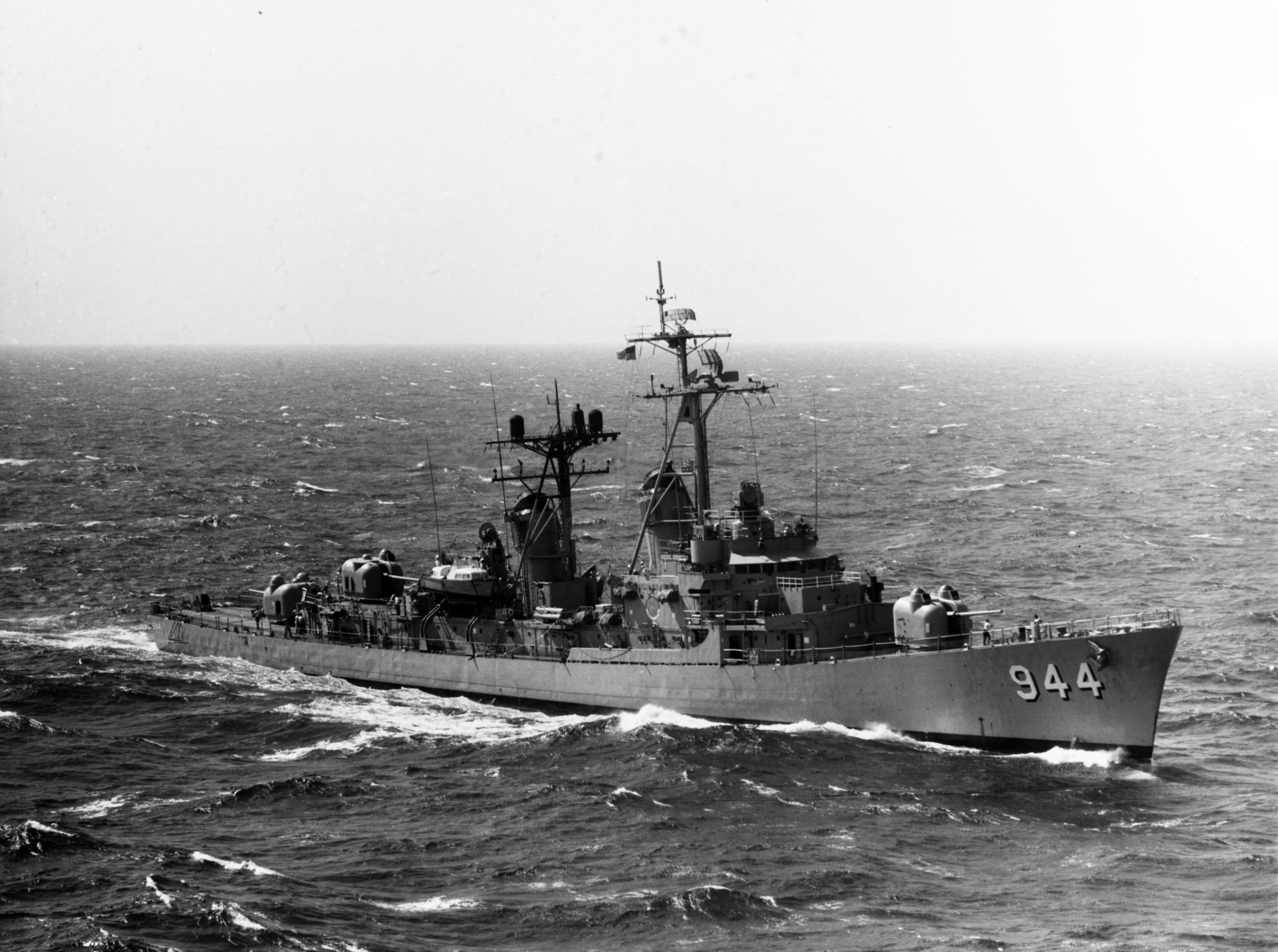
USS Mullinnix in 1970

The exterior shots of the destroyer used in this episode were of USS Mullinnix while the interior shots were done on board the USS Edson.

== Notes ==
1.The only submarine numbered 714 to ever serve with the USN was the USS Norfolk (SSN-714), which wouldn't be made for 13 years after this episode. Additionally, no submarines were present at the battle. The newest American submarine at that time was USS Barb (SS-220), almost 500 boats earlier in the sequence.
