= Angelo De Augustine =

American musician

- Genres: Indie folk; folk; lo-fi
- Occupation: Musician
- Label: Asthmatic Kitty
- Website: angelodeaugustine.com

Angelo De Augustine is an American musician residing in Thousand Oaks, California. He has collaborated with and opened for musician Sufjan Stevens.

== Early life ==
His parents were both close to music. When he was 5 years old, his father left home. Angelo wanted to be a professional soccer player in his teens, but an injury altered his trajectory. He began playing and writing music after receiving a guitar from a family friend.

== Career ==
Angelo De Augustine self-released his first album in 2014, titled Spirals of Silence. In 2017, Angelo De Augustine released his second full-length album and first with Asthmatic Kitty Records, titled Swim Inside The Moon. In a 2018 review of the artist's "Carcassonne," NPR said that De Augustine wrote it for people who dream of visiting small villages and towns in France. NPR characterized the song's mood as being "like waves rushing onto the shore." In 2019, Angelo De Augustine released his third full-length album and second with Asthmatic Kitty Records titled Tomb. The Irish Times described the artist's Tomb album as "his first bona fide studio album" that followed "a series of low-key releases recorded in a bathtub on a reel-to-reel tape machine and a single microphone."

The artist's "Time" single was performed as a duo with musician Sufjan Stevens.

On September 24, 2021, Augustine and Stevens released a collaborative album titled A Beginner's Mind. They worked on the record together in an upstate New York cabin and watched movies every day for inspiration.

His fourth solo album, titled Toil and Trouble, was released on June 30, 2023.

== Discography ==
Studio albums

- Spirals of Silence (2014)
- Swim Inside the Moon (2017)
- Tomb (2019)
- A Beginner's Mind (2021) – with Sufjan Stevens
- Toil and Trouble (2023)
- Angel In Plainclothes (2026)
