= The Children of Spider County =

- The Outer Limits episode
- Episode no.: Season 1 Episode 21
- Directed by: Leonard Horn
- Written by: Anthony Lawrence
- Cinematography by: Kenneth Peach
- Production code: 25
- Original air date: February 17, 1964

Guest appearances
- Lee Kinsolving; Kent Smith; John Milford; Crahan Denton; Bennye Gatteys

Episode chronology
← Previous "The Bellero Shield"	Next → "Specimen: Unknown"

"The Children of Spider County" is an episode of the original The Outer Limits television show. It first aired on February 17, 1964, during the first season.

== Opening narration ==
"In light of today's growing anxieties, it has become more absolute that the wealth of a nation consists in the number of superior men that it harbors. It is therefore a matter of deep concern, and deeper consequence, when four of the most magnificent and promising young minds in the country suddenly disappear off the face of the Earth..."

== Plot ==
A group of four young prodigies has mysteriously vanished, now all influential figures, and it is noted that they all hailed from the same remote area, Spider County, and that they share the same middle name of Eros, an obscure planet in the Krell galaxy orbiting the Orion constellation. A government agent is sent to investigate the one young prodigy, Ethan Wechsler, who is still in Spider County. He has been incarcerated and accused of murdering a young girl's suitor after he telepathically "overhears" an ill-mannered remark made towards her, followed by a physical altercation between them where the suitor was killed by Ethan as an act of self-defense.

Because of his unique abilities and loner attitude, Ethan is ostracized by the citizens of Spider County, thus compelling his "father" to rescue him from his human captors and return him to Eros, together with his fellow prodigies, where they can be honored and revered for their special gifts, and not feared and despised. Following numerous attempts at escape and recapture, Ethan is finally reunited with his "brothers". He professes his love for the young girl, Anna Bishop, and is steadfast in his refusal to return with his father to Eros, having enjoyed his life on Earth despite encountering prejudice and mistrust throughout the years. The father reluctantly agrees to his son's wishes and, after Ethan convinces his brothers to remain on Earth with him, the alien patriarch departs for his homeworld in Orion without the passengers he had expected would have, unconditionally, accompanied him.

== Closing narration ==
"The wealth of a nation, of a world, consists in the number of superior men that it harbors, and often it seems that these men are too different, too dreaming. And often, because they are driven by powers and dreams strange to us, they are driven away by us. But are they really so different? Are they not, after all, held by the same things that hold us-by strong love, and soft hands?"

== Production ==
Interiors had to be filmed at the Samuel Goldwyn Studios, as production on "The Unknown"/"The Forms of Things Unknown" pilot/episode was using up the soundstages at KTTV.

== Cast ==
- Lee Kinsolving – as Ethan Wechsler
- Kent Smith – as Aable
- Dabbs Greer as Mr. Bishop
- Bennye Gatteys as Anna Bishop
- John Milford – as John Bartlett
- Crahan Denton – as Sheriff Simon Stakefield
- Joey Tata – as Deputy
- Robert Osterloh – as General
- Burt Douglas as Man
- Roy Engel – as Military Intelligence Officer (uncredited)
- Joseph V. Perry – as Mr. Greenbane (uncredited)
- William O'Douglas Jr. – as Aabel in his Alien form (uncredited)
