= The Dark at the Top of the Stairs (film) =

1960 film directed by Delbert Mann

- Theatrical poster for the film
- Directed by: Delbert Mann
- Screenplay by: Harriet Frank Jr. Irving Ravetch
- Based on: The Dark at the Top of the Stairs by William Inge
- Produced by: Michael Garrison
- Starring: Robert Preston; Dorothy McGuire; Eve Arden; Angela Lansbury; Shirley Knight; Lee Kinsolving
- Cinematography: Harry Stradling Sr.
- Edited by: Folmar Blangsted
- Music by: Max Steiner
- Production company: Warner Bros. Pictures
- Release dates: September 22, 1960 (Premiere-New York City); October 8, 1960 (US)
- Running time: 123 minutes
- Country: United States
- Language: English

The Dark at the Top of the Stairs is a 1960 American drama film directed by Delbert Mann and starring Robert Preston and Dorothy McGuire. Shirley Knight garnered an Oscar nomination for Best Supporting Actress and Lee Kinsolving was nominated for a Golden Globe Award as Best Supporting Actor. Knight was also nominated for two Golden Globes. Mann's direction was nominated for a Directors Guild of America Award for Outstanding Directing in a Feature Film. The film was based on the Tony Award-nominated 1957 play of the same name by William Inge.

== Plot ==
During Prohibition in Oklahoma, Rubin Flood is a successful harness and saddle salesman. However, with the advent of the automobile, his job is becoming more difficult. He considers his wife Cora demanding and an over-protective mother. When he learns his company is closing, he is unable to face her, and stops at a pharmacy to partake of "medicinal" alcohol. Cora is out with her daughter Reenie, buying a party dress.

Rubin cannot bring himself to tell Cora he has lost his job, and they argue about how much Cora has spent on Reenie's dress. The couple's younger son Sonny is being bullied at school. Sonny has a fear of the dark. Determined to get him to stand up for himself, Rubin attempts to teach him to box. While sparring, he inadvertently strikes the boy too hard. An incensed Cora accuses Rubin of having an affair with Mavis Pruitt, a local widow. Rubin slaps Cora and storms out of the house. Reenie, having witnessed the row, runs into the street, causing a motorist to swerve and strike a tree. The driver, Sammy Golden, is relatively unhurt, and he and Reenie become attracted to one another.

Cora calls her older sister Lottie to tell her that Rubin hit her. Rubin, still slightly intoxicated, shows up at Mavis's beauty salon, also her home, where he is seen by two town gossips. Rubin tells her Cora has ignored him for years, and while he has remained faithful, he desires Mavis. When she rejects his halfhearted advances, Rubin falls asleep on her sofa.

Days later, Lottie and her husband come for dinner. Cora asks if she and the children can stay with them, then Rubin returns home to apologize. The two gossips tell Cora about Mavis, which re-ignites the argument. He accuses Cora of rejecting him sexually, and she argues that she is preoccupied with worrying about money. Reenie's friend Flirt and her boyfriend arrive, with a date for Reenie, Sammy. Lottie's bigotry is revealed when she suggests that Cora and Rubin might not want to allow Reenie to accompany a Jew to the party.

Sammy and Reenie kiss at the party, but Harry Ralston and his wife berate her for bringing a Jew to the country club, where they are not allowed. Embarrassed, Sammy and Reenie leave. Sammy drops Reenie at home, where she finds Rubin on the sofa. He confesses that he has lost his job and does not know how to tell Cora. The following morning, they learn Sammy has attempted suicide. Reenie rushes to the hospital, telling him that she does not care what people think.

Cora promises Sonny to stop being so over-protective so he can grow into a responsible adult, then receives a call to say that Sammy has died. She heads over to Mavis's salon, where she pretends to be a customer, before revealing that she is Rubin's wife. Mavis confesses that she has been in love with Rubin for years, but that Rubin has always been faithful to Cora, and also reveals that Rubin has lost his job.

Rubin gets a new job as a salesman at an oil drilling equipment company. He returns home to find that Cora has sent Reenie to Lottie's for a few days to recover from Sammy's death. Cora and Rubin commit to paying more attention to each other's needs. As they embrace, Sonny returns home with a friend, one of his former tormentors from school. Rubin pays for the two boys to go to a movie, then follows his wife up to the bedroom.

== Cast ==
- Robert Preston as Rubin Flood
- Dorothy McGuire as Cora Flood
- Eve Arden as Lottie Lacey
- Angela Lansbury as Mavis Pruitt
- Shirley Knight as Reenie Flood
- Lee Kinsolving as Sammy Golden
- Frank Overton as Morris Lacey
- Robert Eyer as Sonny Flood
- Penney Parker as Flirt Conroy
- Ken Lynch as Harry Ralston
- Paul Birch as Jonah Mills (uncredited)
- Peg LaCentra as Edna Harper (uncredited)
- Nelson Leigh as Ed Peabody (uncredited)
- Charles Seel as Percy Weems (uncredited)
- Mary Patton as Mrs Ralston (uncredited)

== Production ==
Warner Bros. Pictures announced in January 1960 that it would be producing a film version of Inge's play, directed by Delbert Mann and starring Robert Preston and Dorothy McGuire. During rehearsals for the production, Mann used the same process that he had used since his first film, Marty, in 1955. First, the cast read through the entire script, then they rehearsed the entire screenplay on set prior to filming. The film went into production in late January, but by the beginning of March, an actor's strike was looming, scheduled for March 7. Warner Bros. shifted to seven-days-a-week production schedules to complete filming before the strike. In mid-July, it was announced that The Dark at the Top of the Stairs would headline the launch of the fall season, and it opened at New York's Radio City Music Hall on September 22, 1960.

== Reception ==
Variety provided a favorable review, noting that The Dark at the Top of the Stairs was "well cast and persuasively acted." However, Bosley Crowther of The New York Times called it a "flawed adaptation of the original stage play." The Film Bulletin described the film a "rather absorbing drama, with goodly shares of humor, warmth, and tragedy," though Preston's performance needed more "humility and tenderness" and Mann's direction, though professional, focused on "certain scenes singularly, rather than integrating them into the whole." Motion Picture Daily provided another positive review while criticizing Mann's direction, writing that he "failed to draw out some of the most vital scenes all the urgency and pathos that Inge had wrote into them."

Shirley Knight earned an Oscar nomination for Best Supporting Actress for her role as Reenie Flood. Knight also received Golden Globe nominations for Best Supporting Actress – Motion Picture and New Star of the Year - Actress. Lee Kinsolving also received a Golden Globe nomination for Best Supporting Actor. Mann was nominated for a Directors Guild of America Award for "outstanding directorial achievement." The film was voted one of the ten best of the year in 1960 by the National Board of Review. Eve Arden's performance rated among the five best of the year by supporting actresses, according to The Film Daily's poll of over 1,800 critics.
