= Lee Kinsolving =

American actor

- Born: Arthur Lee Kinsolving Jr. August 30, 1938; Boston, Massachusetts, U.S.
- Died: December 4, 1974 (aged 36); Palm Beach, Florida, U.S.
- Occupation: Actor
- Years active: 1958–1966
- Spouse: Lillian B. Crawford (m. 1969; div. 1972)

Arthur Lee Kinsolving Jr. (August 30, 1938 – December 4, 1974), was an American film, theater and television actor. In 1960, Kinsolving was nominated for a Golden Globe for Best Supporting Actor at the 18th Golden Globe Awards for his role as Sammy Goldenbaum in the film The Dark at the Top of the Stairs.

== Early life and career ==
Kinsolving was born on August 30, 1938, in Boston, Massachusetts, where his father, Arthur Lee Kinsolving, was serving as the rector of Trinity Church at the time. Father Kinsolving later became the rector of St. James' Episcopal Church, which brought the family to New York City. Kinsolving began his acting career on Broadway.

Kinsolving's acting credits include performances on nearly two dozen prominent television series during the 1950s and 1960s. In a 1959 episode of The Rifleman he performed as Tim Elder, the son of an alcoholic father played by Dabbs Greer. The same year, Kinsolving played Jammie Murdock in an episode of Have Gun Will Travel titled "The Sons of Aaron Murdock." Later, in 1964, on The Twilight Zone episode "Black Leather Jackets," he was cast as an alien who falls in love with a human being portrayed by Shelley Fabares. In 1964, Kinsolving also guest starred on Gunsmoke as identical twin brothers, one good and one evil, in an episode titled "The Other Half." Also in 1964, Kinsolving played a disturbed teenager who kills his only friend by accident on an episode of Route 66 entitled "Follow the White Dove with the Broken Wing".

== Personal life ==
In 1969, Kinsolving married model Lillian B. Crawford. They were divorced in April 1972.

== Death ==
On December 4, 1974, Kinsolving died in Palm Beach, Florida at the age of 36 from a sudden respiratory illness.

== Filmography ==
Film
Year	Title	Role	Notes
1959	The Rifleman	Tim Elder	Season 1 Episode 39: "Boomerang"
1959	Have Gun Will Travel	Jamie Murdock	Season 2 Episode 33: "The Sons of Aaron Murdock"
1960	All the Young Men	Pvt. Dean	
1960	The Dark at the Top of the Stairs	Sammy Golden	
1961	The Explosive Generation	Dan Carlyle	
1964	The Twilight Zone	Scott	Season 5 Episode 18: "Black Leather Jackets"
1964	Gunsmoke	Jess & Jay Bartell	Episode: "The Other Half"
1964	The Outer Limits	Ethan Wechsler	Season 1 Episode 21: "The Children of Spider County"
