= The Invisibles (The Outer Limits) =

- The Outer Limits episode
- Episode no.: Season 1 Episode 19
- Directed by: Gerd Oswald
- Written by: Joseph Stefano
- Cinematography by: Conrad Hall
- Production code: 20
- Original air date: February 3, 1964

Guest appearances
- Don Gordon; George Macready; Dee Hartford; Walter Burke

Episode chronology
← Previous "ZZZZZ"	Next → "The Bellero Shield"

"The Invisibles" is an episode of the original The Outer Limits television show. It first aired on February 3, 1964, during the first season.

== Introduction ==
A United States intelligence agent infiltrates a secret organization known as The Invisibles, who are intent on using alien parasites to take over the bodies of high-level government officials.

== Opening narration ==
"You do not know these men. You may have looked at them, but you did not see them. They are newspapers blowing down a gutter on a windy night. For reasons both sociological and psychological these three have never joined or been invited to join society. They have never experienced love or friendship, or formed any lasting or constructive relationship, but today, at last, they will become a part of something. They will belong. They will come a little closer to their unrealistic dreams of power and glory. Today, finally they will join th... I almost said the human race, and that would have been a half-truth, for the race they are joining today is only half human."

== Plot ==
Three of society's outcasts — men named Spain, Plannetta, and Castle — are taken to an abandoned army post compound that serves as the headquarters of a subversive secret society known as the Invisibles. In their initial debriefing, Spain immediately recognizes the man speaking to them as the governor of an unnamed state. The "governor" rebuts him, saying that his only role is as ruler of the Society of the Invisibles. Their purpose is to infect key government and business figures with crab-like creatures who attach themselves to people's backs and take over their minds. By doing so, the Invisibles plan to conquer the world. Each of the new recruits will be given a target to infect following his inoculation, which will provide temporary immunity from the creatures. Castle's inoculation is unsuccessful, and he ends up deformed, as is one of the aides at the compound.

It turns out that Spain is actually an agent for the GIA, sent to infiltrate the Invisibles. He sneaks out to meet his contact in the woods and states his plan to try to establish a friendship with the desperately lonely Plannetta so he can get Plannetta to call his "kid brother" so that they can meet up later. In reality, the number is that of GIA headquarters. Spain's plan hits a hitch when Johnny (his contact) is killed and brought in as a corpse for the trainees to practice on.

Spain is assigned to infect General Hillary Clarke in Washington, D.C., while posing as his faithless wife's chauffeur. However, the reality is that the Invisibles are onto him. Clarke is already infected, and Spain was sent there so that Clarke could infect him when his inoculation wore off. Spain manages to escape when Clarke says too much and is momentarily tortured by his Invisible. As Spain flees, Clarke's wife is driving up, and she hits him with the car, breaking his leg. Spain blacks out from the pain. When he comes to, Mrs. Clarke is tending to his injury, but he limps away and steals a car before Clarke can find him.

Spain finally manages to find Plannetta, only to meet another twist of fate: he was Plannetta's target all along. Weeping because he thinks Spain betrayed him, Plannetta sets an Invisible on the ground, which begins to crawl toward Spain. The Invisible does not move quickly, but neither does Spain in his condition. In the nick of time, his fellow GIA agents arrive, shooting both the creature and Plannetta, thus saving Spain's life. However, Spain can only think of the fact that the Invisible menace is everywhere, although a GIA agent assures him that the threat is over because the agency has captured General Clarke's aide Oliver Fair, who is "cooperating".

== Closing narration ==
"You do not know these men. You may have looked at them, but you did not see them. They are the wind that blows newspapers down a gutter on a windy night -- and sweeps the gutter clean."

== Trivia ==
There is an unusual pause in the course of the opening narration which seems to indicate that the Control Voice makes a mistake of appreciation: “Today, finally, they will join the hu... I almost said the human race.” The Control Voice then explains the Society of Invisibles are only half human.

Neil Hamilton, who plays Gen. Clarke, is perhaps best known for his role as Commissioner Gordon in the 1960s Batman TV series. He also plays the father-in-law of Sally Kellerman's character in the following episode, "The Bellero Shield".

== Website Rating ==
The website TV.com allows members to rank episodes on a 1 to 10 scale. As of 3/21/09, the average rating given to "The Invisibles" was 8.8, the third-highest of any episode in the series. Only "Demon With a Glass Hand" and "The Man Who Was Never Born" had received higher fan ratings as of that date.

== Cast ==
- Don Gordon – as Luis B. Spain
- George Macready – as Larry K. Hillerman
- Dee Hartford – as Mrs. Clarke
- Walter Burke – as Recruiter
- Neil Hamilton – as Hilary J. Clarke
- Tony Mordente – as Genero Planetta
- Len Lesser – as GIA Agent
- John Graham – as Supervisor
- Richard Dawson (credited as Dick Dawson) – as Oliver Fair
- William O. Douglas Jr. – as Henry Castle
- Chris Warfield – as Johnny
- Vic Perrin – as voice of GIA Chief (uncredited)
- Robert Johnson – as voice of Invisibles (uncredited)
