= Mary Baker Eddy =

American founder of Christian Science (1821–1910)

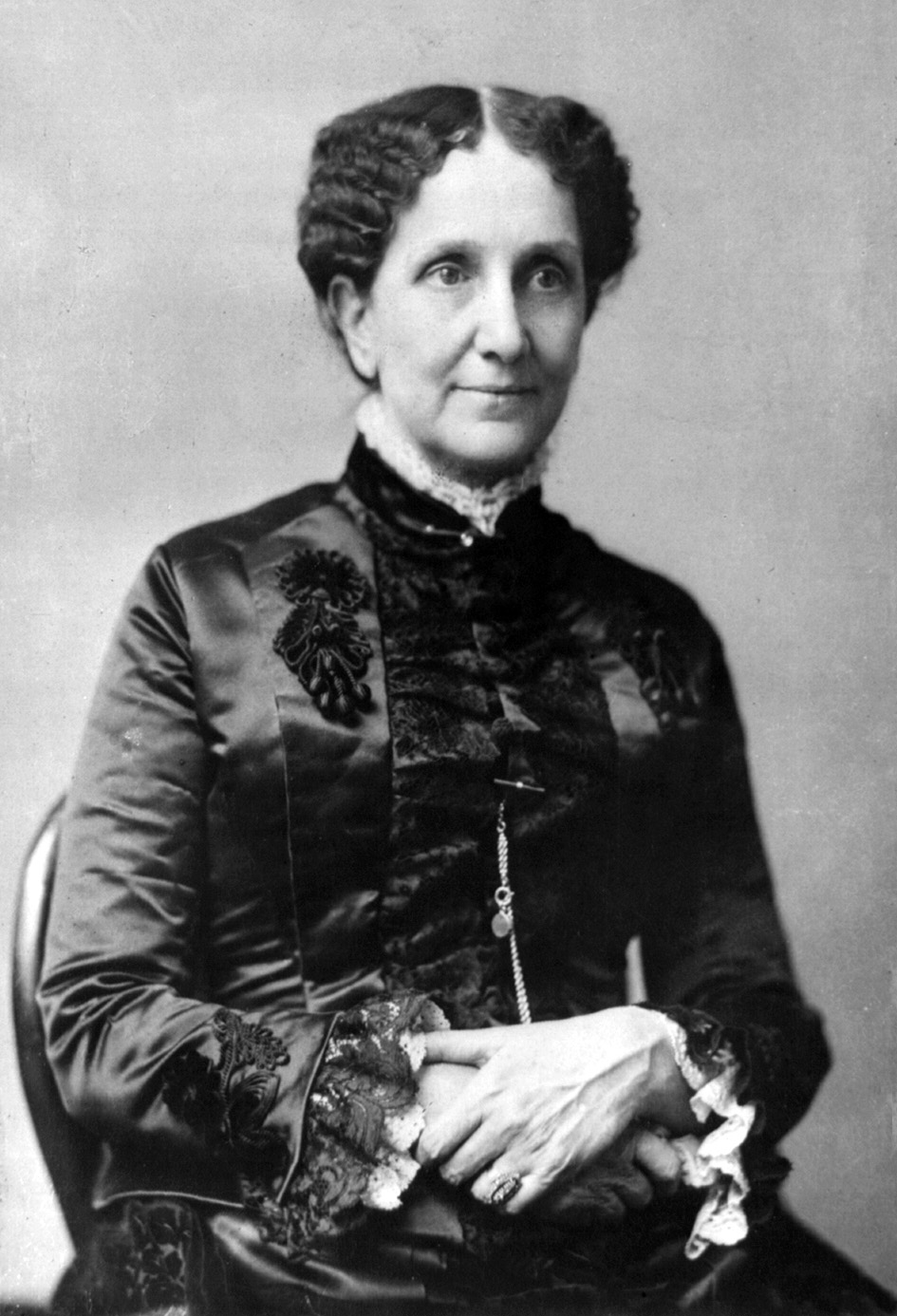
- Eddy, c. 1880s
- Born: Mary Morse Baker; July 16, 1821; Bow, New Hampshire, U.S.
- Died: December 3, 1910 (aged 89); Newton, Massachusetts, U.S.
- Resting place: Mount Auburn Cemetery, Cambridge, Massachusetts, U.S.
- Other names: Mary Baker Glover, Mary Patterson, Mary Baker Glover Eddy, Mary Baker G. Eddy
- Known for: Founder of Christian Science
- Notable work: Science and Health (1875)
- Spouses: George Washington Glover (m. 1843; died 1844) Daniel Patterson (m. 1853; div. 1873) Asa Gilbert Eddy (m. 1877; died 1882)
- Children: George Washington Glover II; Ebenezer J. Foster Eddy (adopted)
- Parent: Mark Baker (father); Abigail Ambrose Baker (mother)
- Relatives: Henry M. Baker (cousin)
- Works related to Mary Baker Eddy at Wikisource

Mary Baker Eddy (née Baker; July 16, 1821 – December 3, 1910) was an American religious leader and author, who in 1879 founded The Church of Christ, Scientist, the Mother Church of the Christian Science movement. She also founded The Christian Science Monitor in 1908, and three religious magazines: the Christian Science Sentinel, The Christian Science Journal, and The Herald of Christian Science.

Born in 1821 in Bow to a Congregationalist family, Mary Morse Baker was often afflicted by unknown diseases as a child. Rejecting the Congregationalism of her family, she became influenced by the Mesmerist ideas of Phineas Parkhurst Quimby, and after falling on the ice in Lynn, Massachusetts in 1866 she said she underwent a miraculous recovery through reading the Bible. In the decades after, she would teach her doctrine to many students, establishing the Christian Science movement in the 1860s and 1870s. In the 1880s, Eddy opened a college in Massachusetts, writing and lecturing widely, while managing internal conflicts and growing public scrutiny. She was the leader of the Christian Science movement until her death in 1910. Christian Scientists today honor Eddy as the "Discoverer and Founder of Christian Science", while critics view Eddy's methods as harmful and ineffective.

Eddy wrote numerous books and articles, most notably the book Science and Health with Key to the Scriptures, first published in 1875 and republished many times until 1910. Other works Eddy authored include Manual of The Mother Church, and a collection of varied writings that were consolidated posthumously into a book called Prose Works.

== Early life ==
=== Bow, New Hampshire ===
==== Family ====
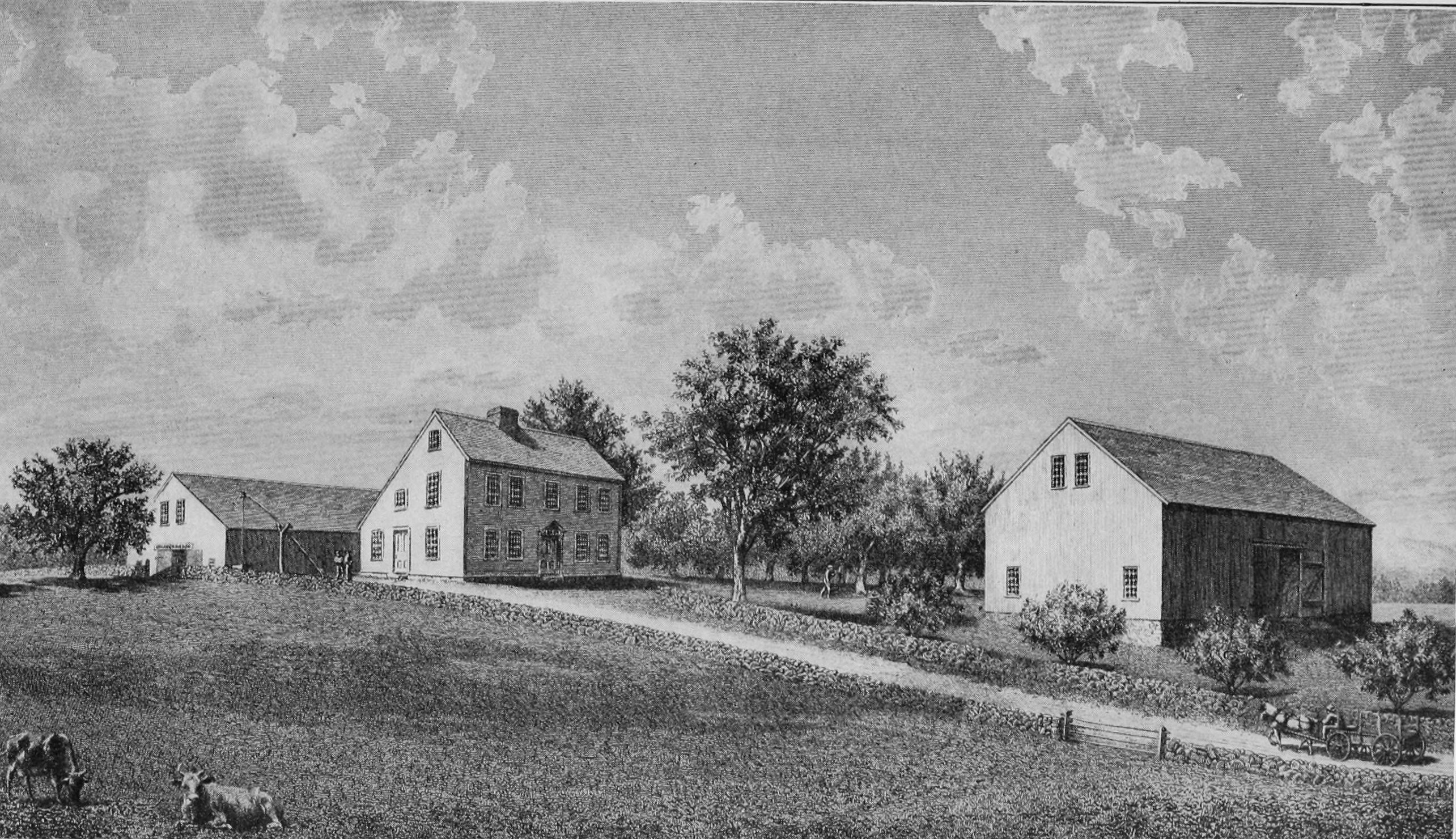
Eddy's birthplace in Bow, New Hampshire

Eddy was born Mary Morse Baker on July 16, 1821, in a farmhouse in Bow, New Hampshire to farmer Mark Baker (d. 1865) and his wife Abigail Barnard Baker, née Ambrose (d. 1849). Eddy was the youngest of six children: boys Samuel Dow (1808), Albert (1810), and George Sullivan (1812), followed by girls Abigail Barnard (1816), Martha Smith (1819), and Mary Morse (1821). She was the cousin of U.S. Representative Henry M. Baker.

She was the sixth generation of her family born in the United States. The farmhouse she was born in was built by her grandfather, Joseph Baker Jr., on a tract of land his maternal grandfather, Captain John Lovewell, had been given for service in the American Revolutionary War. Eddy's father Mark inherited the farm alongside his elder brother James when Joseph Jr. died in 1816.

A staunch Calvinist, Mark Baker was an active member of the Tilton Congregationalist Church. McClure's reported he had a reputation for holding strong opinions and quarreling with those he disagreed with; one neighbor described him as "[a] tiger for a temper and always in a row." They also stated he was an ardent supporter of slavery and a Copperhead who was reportedly pleased to hear about Abraham Lincoln's death. Despite trying to oust his Republican pastor during the war alongside a faction of his church, he refused to leave the church alongside other members of the faction when they failed. Instead, he continued to attend services, but would storm out at the mention of the American Civil War during a service.

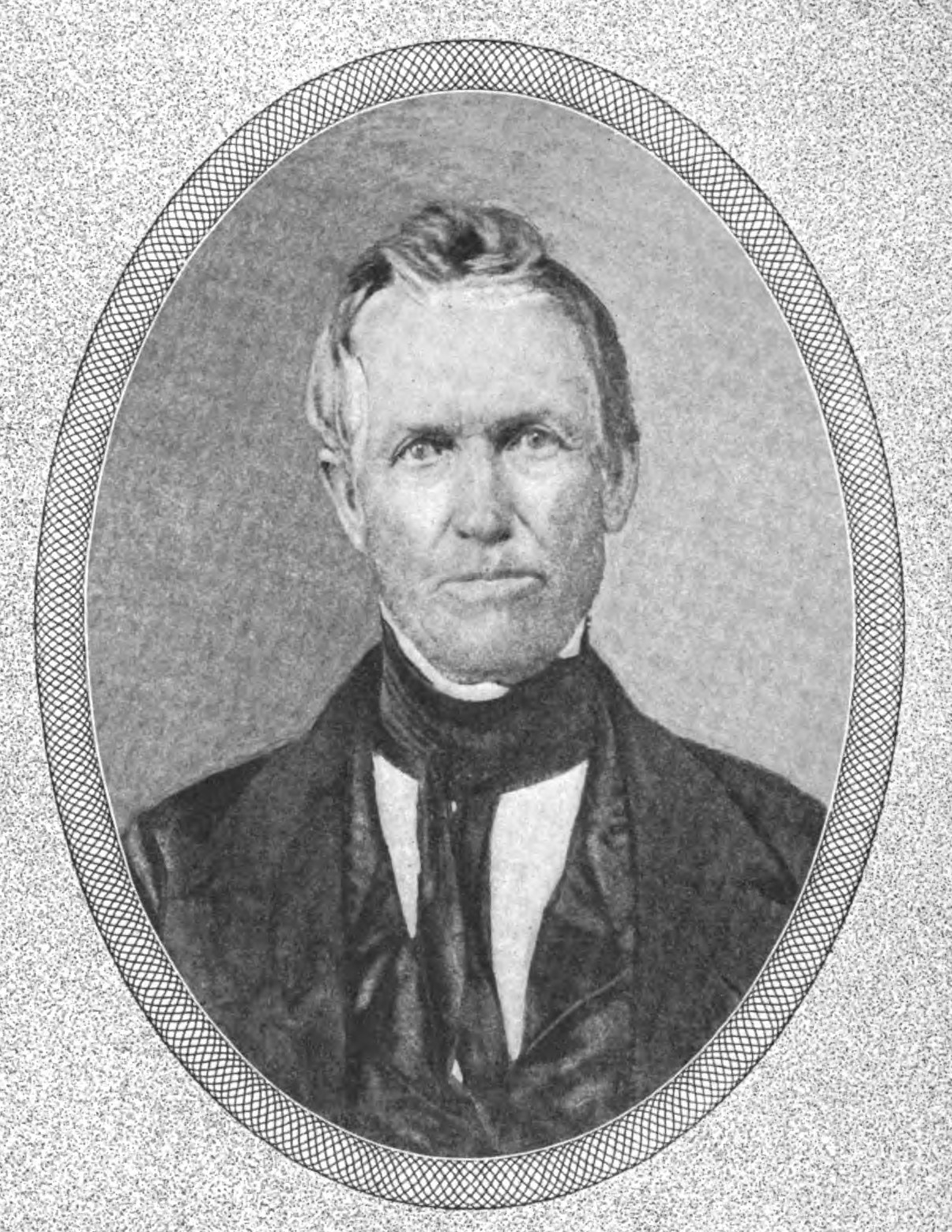
Mark Baker

Eddy and her father reportedly had a volatile relationship. Ernest Sutherland Bates and John V. Dittemore wrote in 1932 that Baker sought to break Eddy's will with harsh punishment, although her mother often intervened; in contrast to the strict religiosity of her father, Eddy's mother was described as devout, quiet, light-hearted and nurturing, and a benevolent spiritual influence on Eddy in her formative years.

==== Health ====
Eddy experienced periods of sudden illness. Those who knew the family described her as suddenly falling to the floor, writhing and screaming, or silent and apparently unconscious, sometimes for hours. Church of Christ, Scientist historian Robert Peel wrote that these fits would require the family to send Eddy to the village doctor.

The cause for Eddy's illness was unclear, but biographer Caroline Fraser wrote she believed the cause was most likely psychogenic in nature. According to psychoanalyst Julius Silberger, Eddy may have been motivated to have these fits in an effort to control her father's attitude toward her. Fraser attributed the illness to a likely combination of hypochondria and histrionics.

=== Tilton, New Hampshire ===
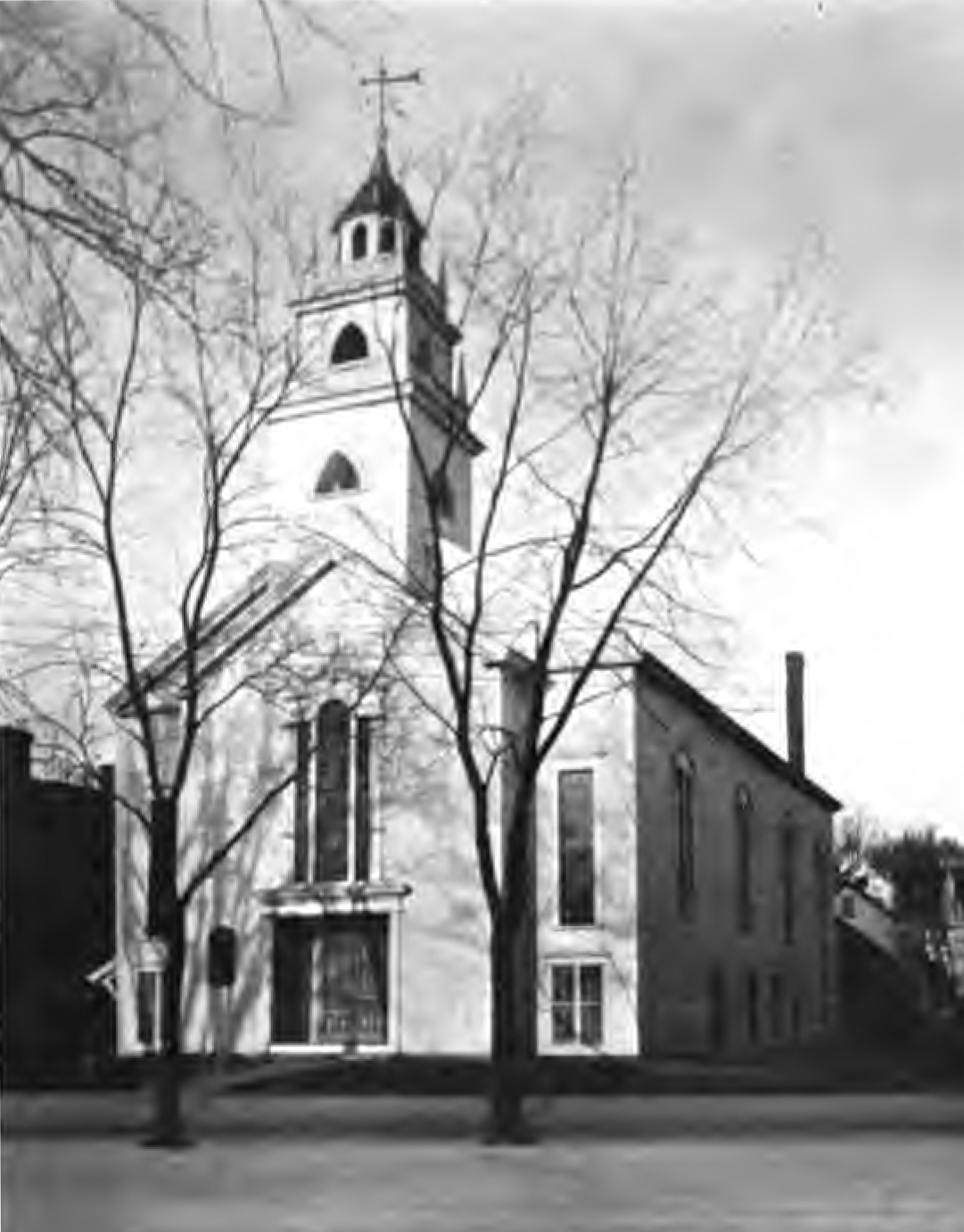
The Congregational Church in Tilton, New Hampshire, which Eddy attended

In 1836, when Eddy was about 14 to 15 years old, she moved with her family to the town of Sanbornton Bridge, New Hampshire, approximately twenty miles (32 km) north of Bow. Sanbornton Bridge was renamed in 1869 as Tilton, New Hampshire.

Ernest Bates and John Dittemore write that Eddy was not able to attend Sanbornton Academy when the family first moved there but was required instead to start at the district school (in the same building) with the youngest girls. She withdrew after a month because of poor health, then received private tuition from the Reverend Enoch Corser. She entered Sanbornton Academy in 1842.

She was received into the Congregational church in Tilton on July 26, 1838, when she was 17, according to church records published by Cather and Milmine. Eddy had written in her autobiography in 1891 that she was 12 when this happened, and that she had discussed the idea of predestination with the pastor during the examination for her membership; this may have been an attempt to mirror the story of a 12-year-old Jesus in the Temple.

=== Marriage, widowhood ===
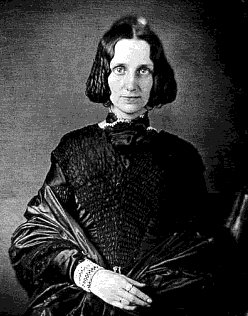
Eddy in the 1850s

Eddy was badly affected by four deaths in the 1840s. She regarded her brother Albert as a teacher and mentor, but he died in 1841. In 1844, her first husband George Washington Glover (a friend of her brother Samuel) died after six months of marriage. They had married in December 1843 and set up home in Charleston, South Carolina, where Glover worked as a builder, but he died of yellow fever in June 1844 while living in Wilmington, North Carolina. According to Eddy, she had freed her husband's slaves upon his death, but according to Caroline Fraser there is no evidence Glover was ever a slave owner.

When Glover died, Eddy was with him in Wilmington, six months pregnant. She had to make her way back to New Hampshire, 1,400 miles (2,300 km) by train and steamboat, where her only child George Washington Glover II (1844 - 1915) was born on September 12 in her father's home. Her husband's death, the journey back, and the birth left her physically and mentally exhausted, and she ended up bedridden for months. Her son was nursed by a local woman while Eddy herself was cared for by Mahala Sanborn, a household servant.

Eddy's mother died in November 1849. Her mother's death was then followed three weeks later by the death of Eddy's fiancé, lawyer John Bartlett. Eddy's father Mark Baker remarried in 1850; his second wife Elizabeth Patterson Duncan (d. June 6, 1875) had been widowed twice, and had some property and income from her second marriage.

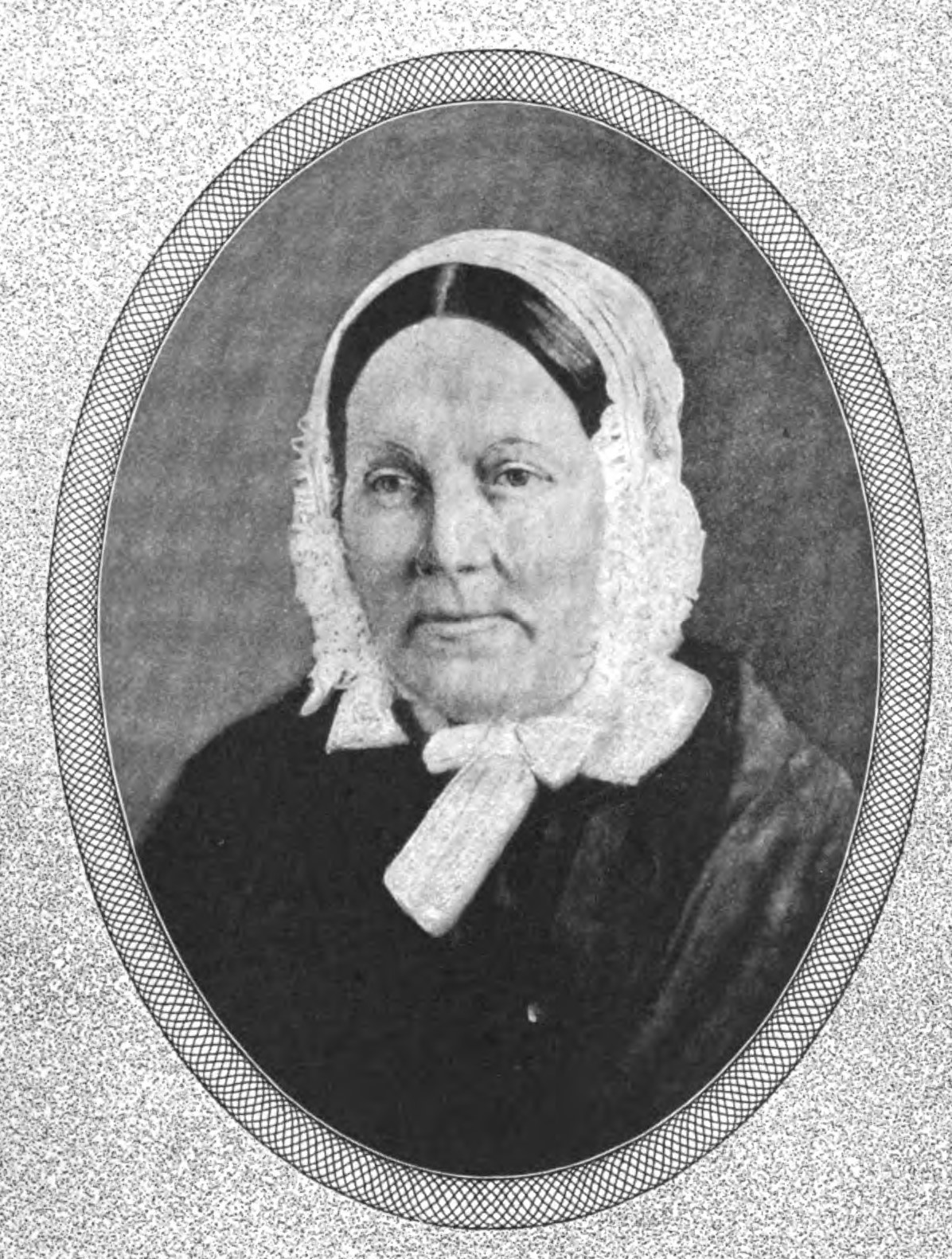
Elizabeth Patterson Duncan Baker, Mark Baker's second wife

Baker apparently made clear to Eddy that her son would not be welcome in the new marital home. In 1851, George Washington Glover II was sent to live permanently with Mahala Sanborn in New Hampshire, which Eddy would later attribute to a plot to separate her from her child.

There is some controversy over Eddy's relationship with her son, with Peel attributing Eddy sending George away to him being a demanding baby and intemperate child, while more critical biographers such as Fraser and Martin Gardner have written that Eddy "lacked affection" for her child, and was either unable or unwilling to care for him, Fraser writing that despite expressing grief over her son's absence "no evidence has been found to support the sympathetic assumption that Mary Glover yearned to regain custody of her son."

Eddy married Dr. Daniel Patterson, a dentist who also practiced homeopathy, in 1853. Their marriage was an unhappy one, with Patterson frequently traveling to find work leaving his chronically ill wife at home in North Groton, where the couple had moved. While bedridden, she owned a scrapbook in which she collected various newspaper clippings, recipes, remedies and other texts which she labeled "Gems of Truth" and "Dewdrops of Wisdom", and prescribed homeopathic cures to her neighbors. In 1859, the Patterson couple was evicted, and moved into a boarding house in Rumney, New Hampshire. In 1862, during the American Civil War, Patterson was tasked with delivering money to the front, but was captured at Bull Run and imprisoned, managing to escape but increasingly abandoning his wife.

== Early influences ==
=== Study with Phineas Quimby ===
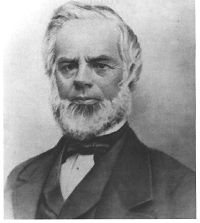
Phineas Parkhurst Quimby

Mesmerism had become popular in New England; and on October 14, 1861, Patterson, wrote to mesmerist Phineas Parkhurst Quimby, who reportedly cured people without medicine, asking if he could cure his wife. Quimby replied that he had too much work in Portland, Maine and that he could not visit her, but if Patterson brought his wife to him he would treat her. Eddy did not immediately go, instead trying the water cure at Dr. Vail's Hydropathic Institute, but was dissatisfied by the treatment she received. A year later, in October 1862, Eddy first visited Quimby. She improved considerably, and publicly declared that she had been able to walk up 182 steps to the dome of city hall after a week of treatment. In November 1862, Eddy wrote a letter to the Portland Evening Courier praising Quimby, while denying he practiced "spiritualism" or "animal magnetism". The cures were temporary, however, and Eddy soon suffered relapses.

Despite the temporary nature of the "cure", she attached religious significance to it, which Quimby did not. Eddy believed that it was the same type of healing performed by Jesus Christ, who, unlike Quimby, administered no medicine or material means in his healings. From 1862 to 1865, Quimby and Eddy engaged in lengthy discussions about healing methods like hydropathy practiced by Quimby and others. She took notes on her own views of healing, as well as writing dictations from him and "correcting" them with her own ideas, some of which according to Church of Christ, Scientist historian Robert Peel possibly ended up in the "Quimby manuscripts" that were published later and attributed to him. According to Caroline Fraser however, "there is no evidence that the Quimby manuscripts contain ideas or language that came from anybody but Quimby", who provided inspiration for much of Eddy's later teachings. H.A.L. Fisher writes that despite Quimby not being especially religious, he embraced the religious connotations Eddy was bringing to his work since he knew his more religious patients would appreciate it. Gardner notes however that Quimby was a "deeply religious man", who believed his methods of healing were the same as those of Jesus Christ, which he referred to in an unpublished 1863 article as "Christian Science". Phineas Quimby died on January 16, 1866, shortly after Eddy's father. (Note: Mark Baker died on October 13, 1865. He left his entire estate to George Sullivan Baker, Mary's brother, and a token $1.00 to Mary and each of her two sisters, a common practice at the time, when male heirs inherited everything.)

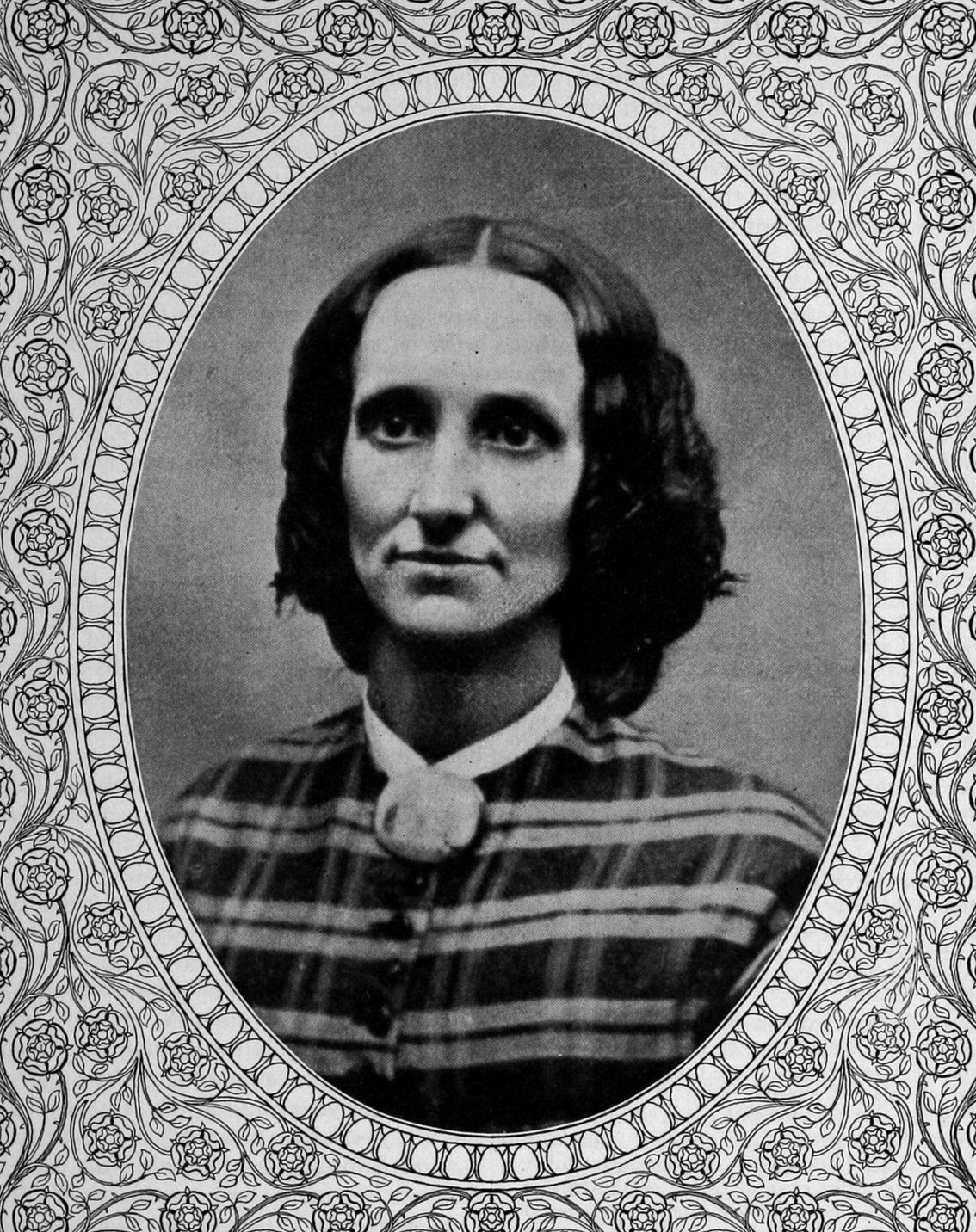
Eddy around 1864

Caroline Fraser has written that while Eddy did not plagiarize Quimby, she was "indebted to Quimby for the basic concepts and language of mind healing". Martin Gardner also notes "her great debt to Quimby", which according to him Eddy tried to downplay in later years to emphasize Christian Science as her own divinely inspired discovery. J. Gordon Melton has argued "certainly Eddy shared some ideas with Quimby. She differed with him in some key areas, however, such as specific healing techniques. Moreover, she did not share Quimby's hostility toward the Bible and Christianity." Biographer Gillian Gill has disagreed with other scholars arguing they "have flouted the evidence and shown willful bias in accusing Mrs. Eddy of owing her theory of healing to Quimby and of plagiarizing his unpublished work", while stating that "this does not mean that Quimby did not have a profound influence on her."

=== 1866 fall ===
On February 1, 1866, while living in Swampscott, Massachusetts, Eddy slipped and fell on a patch of ice. A contemporary account by the Lynn Reporter stated:

Mrs. Mary Patterson of Swampscott fell upon the ice near the corner of Market and Oxford Streets on Thursday evening and was severely injured. She was taken up in an insensible condition and carried into the residence of S. M. Bubier, Esq., near by, where she was kindly cared for during the night. Dr. Cushing, who was called, found her injuries to be internal and of a severe nature, inducing spasms and internal suffering. She was removed to her home in Swampscott yesterday afternoon, though in a very critical condition.

When Georgine Milmine interviewed Dr. Cushing forty years later, he stated that his records from the time documented that Eddy was in a "semi-hysterical" intense emotional state which subsided after she was given a small amount of morphine. According to Cushing in an affidavit, he "did not at any time declare, or believe, that there was no hope for Mrs. Patterson's recovery".

On February 14, 1866, the day after Eddy finished her care with Dr. Cushing, Eddy wrote to Julius Dresser, another patient of Phineas Quimby, stating that her injury and her subsequent medical care had undone all of the healing that Quimby had done before, and requested that he heal her. Dresser refused, stating that he was not enough to take on the burden of healing, and urged Eddy to instead spread Quimby's teachings further. Eddy would later credit her accident as her moment of spiritual revelation and the "falling apple" that led to her discovery of Christian Science. She stated that after rejecting the medicines offered to her by her doctor, she opened her Bible three days after her fall and returned to full health after reading of Jesus healing the sick.

A few months after Eddy's accident, Patterson abandoned her, leaving Eddy destitute and dependent on occasional payments from Patterson and the generosity of friends and moving eight times around the Boston area that year.

=== Spiritualism ===
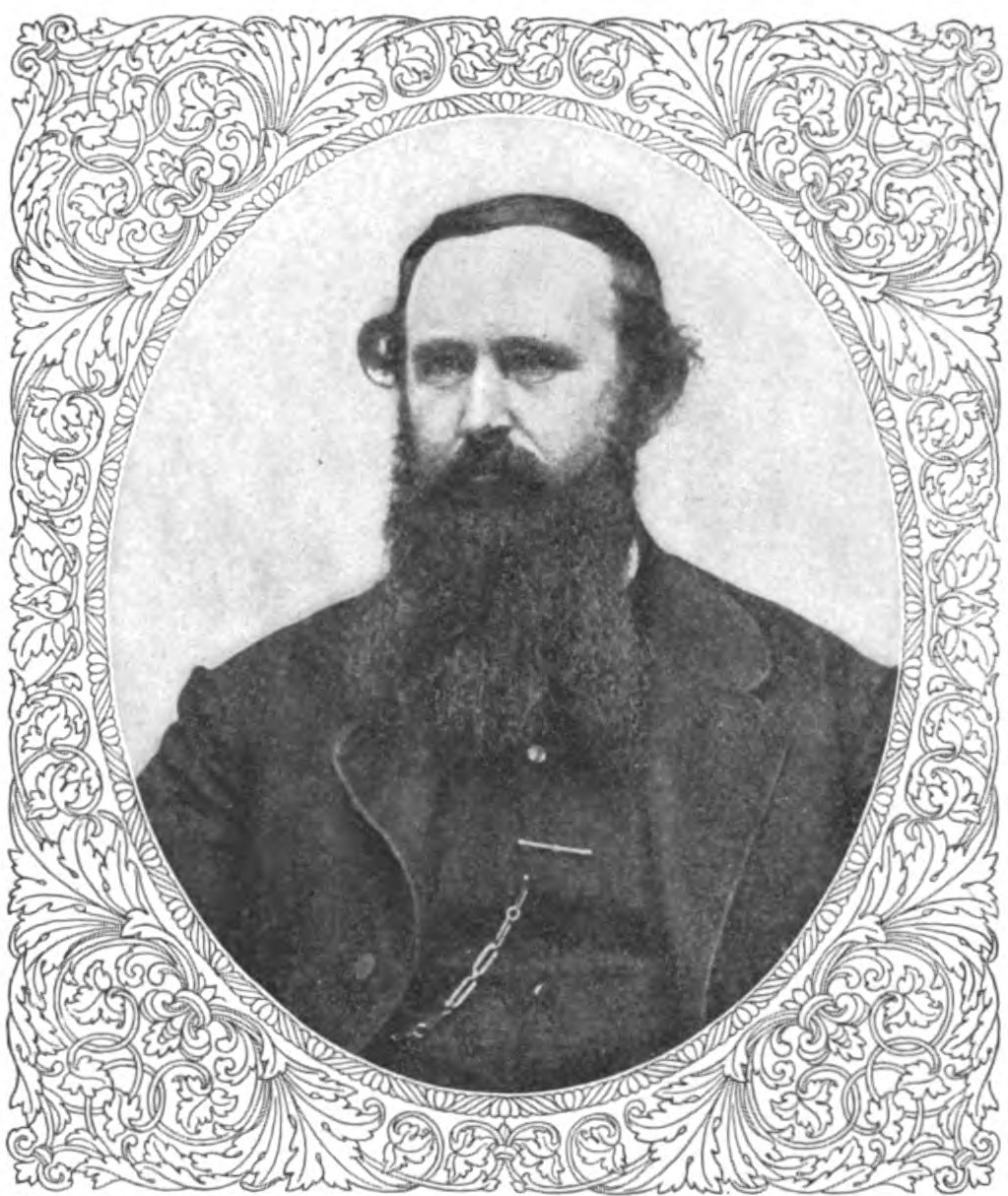
Daniel Patterson

Eddy separated from her second husband Daniel Patterson in 1866, after which she boarded for four years with several families in Lynn, Massachusetts and elsewhere. Frank Podmore wrote:

But she was never able to stay long in one family. She quarrelled successively with all her hostesses, and her departure from the house was heralded on two or three occasions by a violent scene. Her friends during these years were generally Spiritualists; she seems to have professed herself a Spiritualist, and to have taken part in séances. She was occasionally entranced, and had received "spirit communications" from her deceased brother Albert. Her first advertisement as a healer appeared in 1868, in the Spiritualist paper The Banner of Light. During these years she carried about with her a copy of one of Quimby's manuscripts giving an abstract of his philosophy. This manuscript she permitted some of her pupils to copy.

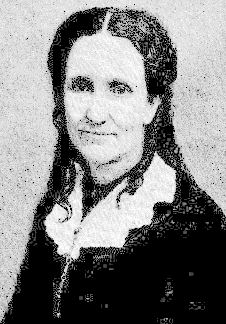
Eddy in Lynn, Massachusetts in 1871

According to Church of Christ, Scientist historian Peel, spiritualists were "eager to claim her as one of their own." After she became well known, reports surfaced that Eddy had been a medium years earlier in Boston and St. Louis, though according to Peel at the time when she was said to be a medium there, she lived some distance away in North Groton, where she was reportedly bedridden. According to Gill, Eddy knew spiritualists and took part in some of their activities, but was never a convinced believer. For example, she visited her friend Sarah Crosby in 1864, who believed in Spiritualism. According to Sibyl Wilbur, a biographer sympathetic to Eddy, Eddy attempted to show Crosby the folly of it by pretending to channel Eddy's dead brother Albert and writing letters which she attributed to him. In regard to the deception, biographer Hugh Evelyn Wortham stated "Mrs. Eddy's followers explain it all as a pleasantry on her part to cure Mrs. Crosby of her credulous belief in spiritualism." However, Martin Gardner has argued against this, stating that Eddy was working as a spiritualist medium and was convinced by the messages. According to Gardner, Eddy's mediumship converted Crosby to Spiritualism.

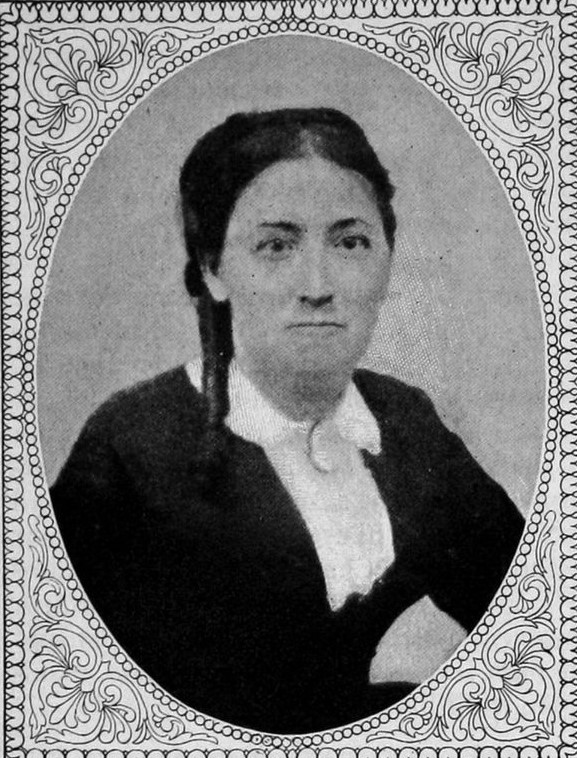
Sarah Crosby

In one of her spiritualist trances to Crosby, Eddy gave a message that was supportive of Phineas Parkhurst Quimby, stating "P. Quimby of Portland has the spiritual truth of diseases. You must imbibe it to be healed. Go to him again and lean on no material or spiritual medium." The paragraph that included this quote was later omitted from an official sanctioned biography of Eddy.

Between 1867 and 1868, Eddy boarded at the home of Brene Paine Clark who was interested in Spiritualism. Seances were often conducted there, but according to Gill Eddy and Clark engaged in arguments about them. According to Cather and Milmine, Richard Hazeltine attended seances at Clark's home, and Eddy had acted as a trance medium, stating she was channeling the spirits of the Apostles. According to Gill, Eddy's arguments against Spiritualism convinced at least one other who was there at the time—Hiram Crafts—that "her science was far superior to spirit teachings." Crafts became the first of Eddy's students, until the two had a falling out over either finances or Eddy asking Crafts to divorce his wife.

Mary Gould, a Spiritualist from Lynn, stated that one of the spirits that Eddy channeled was Abraham Lincoln. According to eyewitness reports cited by Cather and Milmine, Eddy was still attending séances as late as 1872. In these later séances, Eddy would attempt to convert her audience into accepting Christian Science. Eddy showed extensive familiarity with Spiritualist practice, but she denounced it in later Christian Science writings. Historian Ann Braude wrote that there were similarities between Spiritualism and Christian Science, but the main difference was that Eddy came to believe, after she founded Christian Science, that spirit manifestations had never really had bodies to begin with, because matter is unreal and that all that really exists is spirit, before and after death.

In the fiftieth edition of her book, Science and Health with Key to the Scriptures, published in 1891, Eddy added the chapter, Christian Science and Spiritualism. This chapter was renamed in 1910 to Christian Science versus Spiritualism.

== Building a church ==
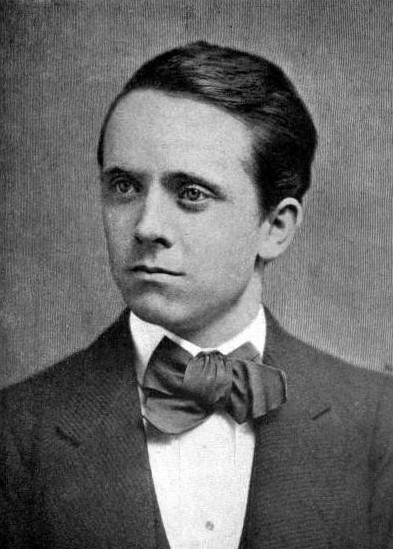
Richard Kennedy

Crafts was replaced as Eddy's main student by Richard Kennedy, whom Eddy had met as a fellow tenant in 1867. Eddy had agreed to form a partnership with Kennedy in 1870, in which Kennedy would pay her $1000 for her to teach him how to heal, and he would take patients, with Eddy receiving half of his earnings. The partnership was rather successful at first, but by 1872 Kennedy had fallen out with Eddy. Although there were multiple issues raised, the main reason for the break was Eddy's insistence that Kennedy stop "rubbing" his patient's head and solar plexus, which she saw as harmful since, as Gill states, "traditionally in mesmerism or hypnosis the head and abdomen were manipulated so that the subject would be prepared to enter into trance." After their split, Eddy believed that Kennedy was using his mesmeric abilities to try to harm her and her movement, and sued him in 1878, being awarded $250. After another former student named Wallace W. Wright wrote an article in the Lynn Transcript criticizing Eddy, including for what he saw as her practicing mesmerism, Eddy came to believe Wright and Kennedy were plotting together to take her down. Eddy quit teaching from 1872 to 1875 to work on her manuscript and due to a reduced demand for her services. Kennedy was eventually replaced as Eddy's student by George Barry.

Eddy divorced Daniel Patterson for adultery in 1873. After being rejected by publishers in 1873 and 1874, and receiving $1500 in funding from Barry and another student, published her work in 1875 in a book entitled Science and Health (years later retitled Science and Health with Key to the Scriptures). The first publication run was 1,000 copies, which she self-published, but only a few hundred were sold. According to Eddy, the book had been written by a "divine power". Robert Peel described the first edition by noting that "Sentences are chaotic, punctuation erratic, quotations inexact, meanings obscure." Caroline Fraser considers it an "odd and unformed book", with "crude" grammar and sentence construction.

During these years, she taught what she considered the science of "primitive Christianity" and the "lost art of healing" to at least 800 people. Many of her students became practitioners themselves. The last 100 pages of Science and Health (chapter entitled "Fruitage") contains testimonies of people who affirm to have been healed by reading her book, who were listed only by their initials, which made it difficult for skeptics to verify the veracity of the statements made in the testimonials. She made numerous revisions to her book from the time of its first publication until shortly before her death.

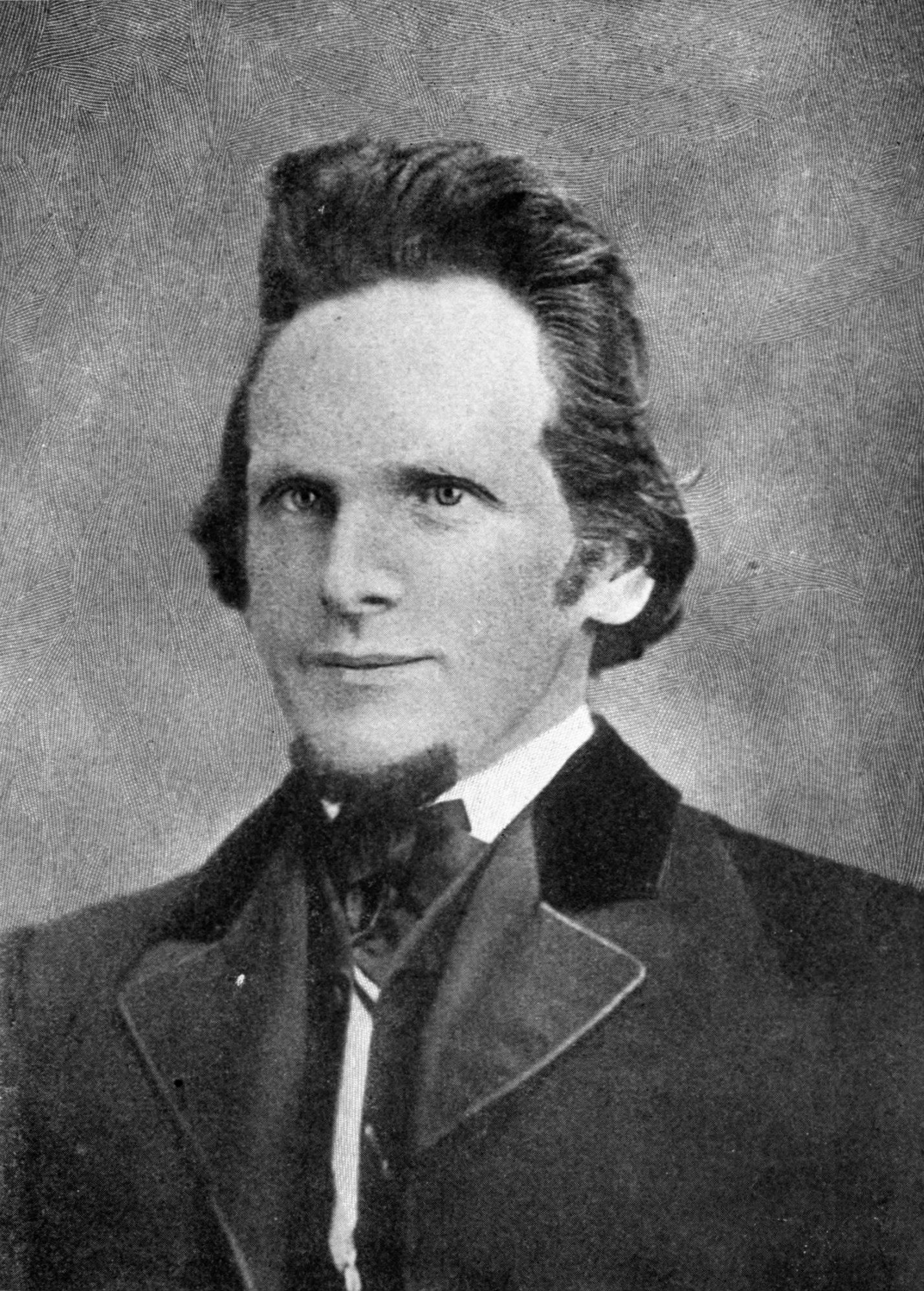
Asa Gilbert Eddy (1826–1882)

George Barry was supplanted around 1875 as Eddy's favorite student by Daniel Spofford, a healer who had been introduced to Eddy's thought by his wife. Spofford attempted to divorce his wife, with the apparent intention of marrying Eddy, but was rebuffed. She then married another student of hers, Asa Gilbert Eddy. On January 1, 1877, the two were wed, and she became Mary Baker Eddy in a small ceremony presided over by a Unitarian minister. George Barry then sued Eddy for $2,700, and after Spofford testified on his behalf he along with Barry was expelled from the Christian Science Association, which had been founded in 1876.

In 1878, Gilbert Eddy and Edward Arens, an attorney and follower of Eddy, were arrested on suspicion of conspiring to murder Daniel Spofford, with barkeeper Thomas Sargent testifying Arens had offered him $500 to kill Spofford. After suspicions arose that Sargent had lied all charges were dropped in January 1879, but the media attention to the case gave Mary Baker Eddy a negative reputation.

By the 1870s, Eddy was telling her students, "Some day I will have a church of my own." The second edition of Science and Health was published in 1878 in two volumes, although copies of the first volume were ordered destroyed by Eddy due to the many typographical errors it contained. In 1879, she and her students established the Church of Christ, Scientist, "to commemorate the word and works of our Master [Jesus], which should reinstate primitive Christianity and its lost element of healing."

In 1881, Mary Baker Eddy started the Massachusetts Metaphysical College with a charter from the state which allowed her to grant degrees. She appointed herself as Professor of Metaphysics and Christian Science, and charged her students $300 each for tuition, a large sum for the time. That same year, during a meeting of the Christian Science Association at Eddy's home eight students read out a critical declaration denouncing what they viewed as Eddy's "departure from the straight and narrow road [...] made manifest by frequent ebullitions of temper, love of money, and the appearance of hypocrisy", after which Eddy had a spiritual revelation and had several followers stay with her for three days, thereby weakening the blow to the Christian Science movement as a whole.

In Spring 1882, the Eddys moved to Boston to Massachusetts Metaphysical College. Gilbert Eddy's health began to decline around this time, and he died on June 3 that year. After his death, Eddy took on Calvin Frye as her secretary and loyal companion, who would remain by her side until Eddy's death.

Eddy taught students at Massachusetts Metaphysical College between 1882 and 1889, and spent much of the 1880s traveling the United States lecturing publicly about Christian Science and gaining many followers, including in Chicago in 1884 and a debate with two Protestant ministers in Boston in 1885 where despite the cold reception she gained the respect of some members of the clergy. Eddy's growing popularity during this time led to the rise of many competing organizations claiming to be teaching Christian Science, some of them former adherents of Eddy who had split off from her. Eddy condemned these groups as "Mind-Quacks" who were in her opinion deceiving the public.

In 1888, the first Christian Science Reading Room was opened, with the intention of spreading Christian Science publications and serving as a social gathering place for Christian Scientists. That same year in September, the movement was rocked by a scandal surrounding Abby Corner, a Christian Science Practitioner in West Medford, Massachusetts, who had provided Christian Science treatment during her daughter's childbirth after which her daughter and the newborn both died. Corner was tried for manslaughter but acquitted as the court ruled that her daughter would have died even if given medical treatment. In the April 1888 issue of the Christian Science Journal, Eddy disavowed Corner, stating she had never attended Massachusetts Metaphysical College, but after her acquittal Eddy said she had always known Corner would be acquitted. From 1888, obstetrics courses at Massachusetts Metaphysical College would be taught by Ebenezer J. Foster, who Eddy legally adopted in November 1888, changing his name to Ebenezer J. Foster Eddy, but eventually fell out of favor with Eddy a decade later. In 1902 Eddy abolished the teaching of obstetrics in Christian Science courses altogether, allowing Christian Scientists to utilize medical help during childbirth.

In 1889, Massachusetts Metaphysical College was closed due to Eddy being "tired, tired, of teaching and being the slave of so many minds.", what according to Caroline Fraser some writers have attributed to the Massachusetts Attorney General investigating colleges granting fraudulent medical degrees around this time.

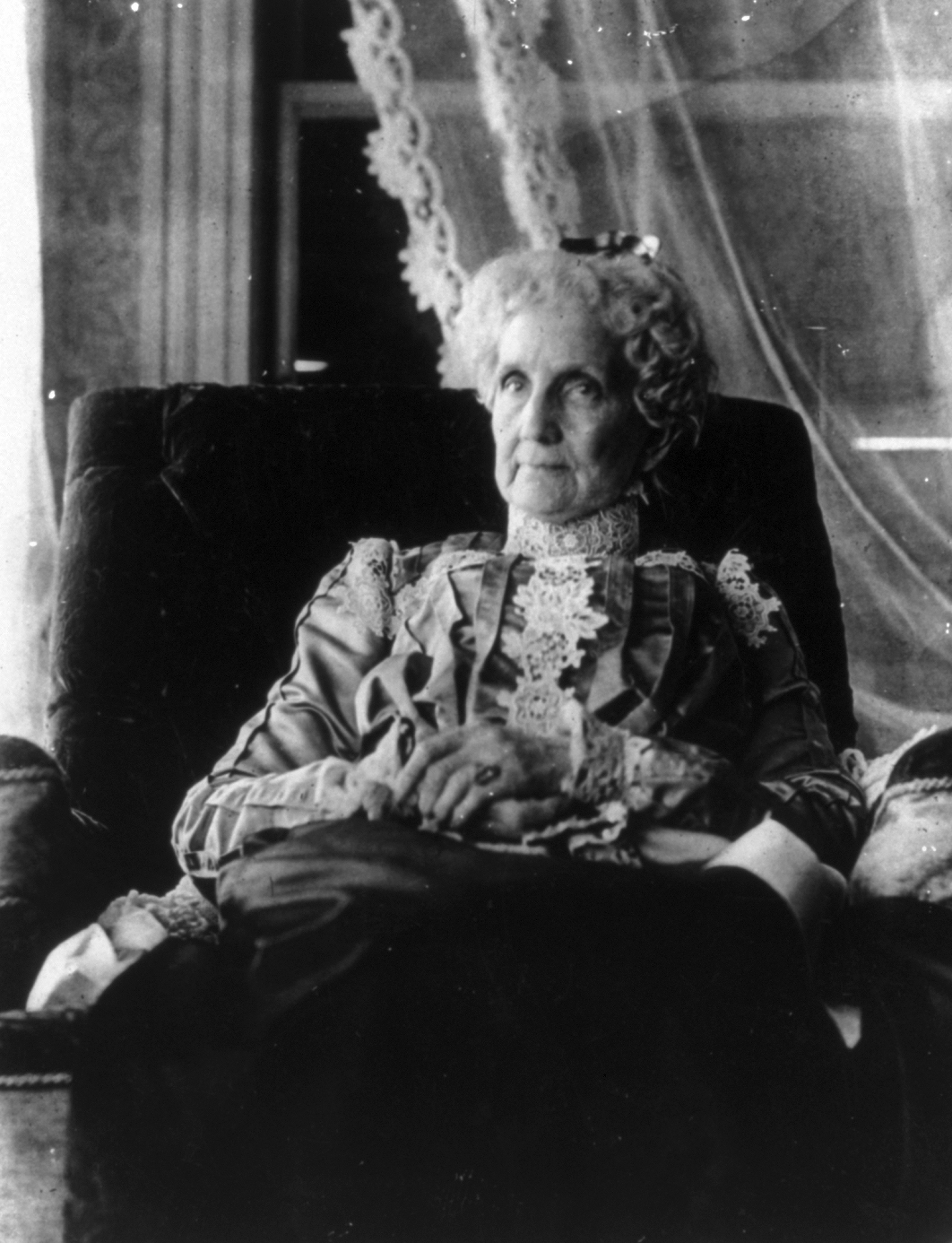
Mary Baker G. Eddy in later years

Eddy devoted the rest of her life to the establishment of the church, writing its bylaws, The Manual of The Mother Church, and revising Science and Health. In 1889, she had the Boston branch of the church give up its rights to elect their pastors and administer their own affairs, formally bringing it under the church hierarchy.

An 1890 religious census counted 8,724 adherents of Christian Science across the United States. In 1892, at Eddy's direction, the church reorganized as The First Church of Christ, Scientist. In 1894, an edifice for The First Church of Christ, Scientist was completed in Boston. Eddy refused to attend the dedication ceremony in person, which Robert Peel interpreted as a sign of Eddy's rejection of a cult of personality within the church. A diary from Clara Shannon, one of Eddy's servants reveals she had Shannon withdraw money from her personal bank account to buy a dress uncontaminated by malicious animal magnetism for the occasion, but decided at the last minute not to attend for unclear reasons.

Her students spread across the country practicing Christian Science, and instructing others, and in the 1890s to the United Kingdom and Germany. Eddy authorized these students to list themselves as Christian Science Practitioners in the church's The Christian Science Journal. She also founded the Christian Science Sentinel, a weekly magazine with articles about how to heal and testimonies of healing.

When the church re-organized in 1892, Eddy was made the leader of the church as "Pastor Emeritus". In 1895, she ordained the Bible and Science and Health as the church's religious texts. As the leader of the church, Eddy was often called "Mother" by her followers.

Eddy founded The Christian Science Publishing Society in 1898, which became the publishing home for numerous publications launched by her and her followers. In 1908, at the age of 87, she founded The Christian Science Monitor, a daily newspaper. She also founded The Christian Science Journal in 1883, a monthly magazine aimed at the church's members and, in 1898, the Christian Science Sentinel, a weekly religious periodical written for a more general audience, and the Herald of Christian Science, a religious magazine with editions in many languages.

In June 1890, Josephine Curtis Woodbury, a follower of Eddy since the 1870s who had operated her own Christian Science college in the 1880s, announced she had given birth to a son she dubbed the "Prince of Peace" through what she labeled an "immaculate conception". Woodbury claimed she had conceived him without sexual intercourse, exclusively by making use of an eccentric interpretation of the teachings of Eddy, and citing a passage in Science and Health which recounted a story where a child was trained to remain underwater for nearly 20 minutes nearly drowned Woodbury's son while attempting to recreate the passage. Eddy strongly opposed Woodbury's ideas, and eventually expelled her from Christian Science in 1896, after which a public battle in the press ensued ending in Woodbury unsuccessfully suing Eddy for libel from 1899 to 1901.

In response, Eddy created the Committee on Publication in 1900, with the intention to "correct in a Christian manner impositions on the public in regard to Christian Science, injustices done Mrs. Eddy or members of this Church by the daily press, by periodicals or circulated literature of any sort." In the decade after, Eddy frequently attempted to stop the publication of supportive literature about her, including initially Sibyl Wilbur's sympathetic 1907 biography, financed by Christian Scientists, though she later allowed its publication. In 1908, she paid Michael Meehan, a sympathetic New Hampshire newspaper editor, to withdraw a book he had written requested by Eddy, saying it would "keep alive a memory of bitterness and discord."

== Influences and teachings ==
=== Malicious animal magnetism ===
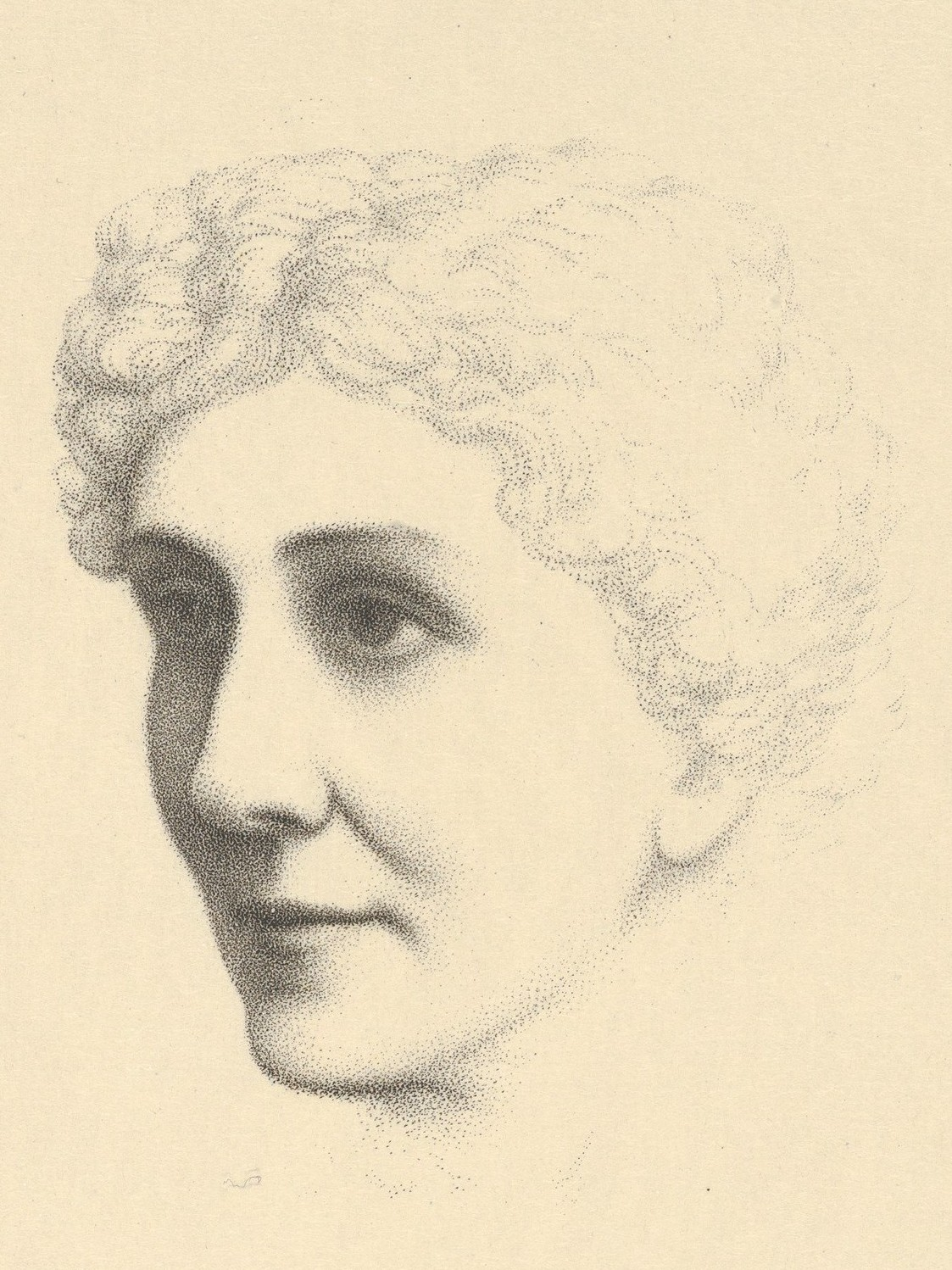
Mary Baker Eddy stipple engraving c. 1924 by Ernest Haskell

According to Eddy, the opposite of Christian Science mental healing was the use of mental powers for destructive or selfish reasons – for which she used terms such as animal magnetism, hypnotism, or mesmerism interchangeably. "Malicious animal magnetism", sometimes abbreviated as M.A.M., is what Catherine Albanese called "a Calvinist devil lurking beneath the metaphysical surface". As there is no personal devil or evil in Christian Science, M.A.M., or mesmerism became the explanation for the problem of evil. Eddy was concerned that a new practitioner could inadvertently harm a patient through unenlightened use of their mental powers, and that less scrupulous individuals could use them as a weapon.

Animal magnetism became one of the most controversial aspects of Eddy's life. The McClure's biography spends a significant amount of time on malicious animal magnetism, which it uses to make the case that Eddy had paranoia. During the Next Friends lawsuit, it was used to charge Eddy with incompetence and "general insanity".

According to Gillian Gill, Eddy's experience with Richard Kennedy, one of her early students, was what led her to begin her examination of malicious animal magnetism.

In 1882, Eddy publicly stated that her last husband, Asa Gilbert Eddy, had died of "mental assassination". Daniel Spofford was another Christian Scientist expelled by Eddy after she accused him of practicing malicious animal magnetism. This gained notoriety in a case irreverently dubbed the "Second Salem Witch Trial".

At her Pleasant View estate near Concord, New Hampshire, Eddy set up "watches" for her staff to pray about challenges facing the Christian Science movement and to handle animal magnetism that arose. Gill writes that Eddy got the term from the New Testament account of the garden of Gethsemane, where Jesus chastises his disciples for being unable to "watch" even for a short time; and that Eddy used it to refer to "a particularly vigilant and active form of prayer, a set period of time when specific people would put their thoughts toward God, review questions and problems of the day, and seek spiritual understanding". Cooks at Pleasant View often had to prepare two meals for Eddy's dinner, in case the first meal was contaminated by animal magnetism, and animal magnetism routinely caused Eddy's dresses not to fit well enough or to have wrinkles according to her. Critics such as Georgine Milmine in Mclure's, Edwin Dakin, and John Dittemore, say this was evidence that Eddy had a great fear of malicious animal magnetism; although Gilbert Carpenter, one of Eddy's staff at the time, insisted she was not fearful of it, and that she was simply being vigilant.

According to Gill, as time went on, Eddy tried to publicly lessen the focus on animal magnetism within the movement, and she worked to clearly define it as unreality, which only had power if one conceded to it. Nonetheless, it continued to play an important role in the teaching of Christian Science, and her fear of malicious animal magnetism would profoundly influence her private life.

The belief in malicious animal magnetism remains a part of Christian Science doctrine. Christian Scientists use it as a specific term for a hypnotic belief in a power apart from God.

=== Hinduism, Buddhism, or other Eastern religions ===
There is some debate on the possible influence of Hinduism, Buddhism, or other Eastern religions on Eddy and her work. The 33rd edition of Science and Health referenced the Bhagavad Gita, which according to Gillian Gill was likely added by James Henry Wiggin, who worked as an editor for Eddy; however Eddy removed all references to Eastern religions in 1891. According to Christian Science historian Stephen Gottschalk, Eddy consciously distinguished Christian Science from Eastern religions starting in the mid-1880s. According to Claire Badaracco, "Eddy knew little about" these religions. Damodar Singhal, however, believes that there were the "echoes" of Vedanta in her work, whether Eddy was directly influenced by Hindu philosophy or not.

=== British Israelism ===
Eddy was introduced to British Israelism by Julia Field-King, who herself was introduced by the writings of C. A. L. Totten. Totten allegedly traced Queen Victoria's genealogy to King David, and Field-King offered to create a genealogy tracing Eddy to King David. Eddy eventually requested that Field-King cease work on the genealogy and transferred her to London to expand the church there. Since her death, academics have debated the extent of Eddy's relationship with British Israelism with Church of Christ, Scientist historian Robert Peel arguing she was "intrigued by the theory for several years," while keeping "it resolutely out of her work and her writing on Christian Science." He acknowledges she uses the term "Anglo-Israel" in one poem, but argues the meaning is "metaphorical" instead of "ethnic or historical."

Political Scientist Michael Barkun argued that "Eddy continued to maintain an interest in British-Israelism, although she kept it out of her doctrinal writings" and noted that a "schismatic offshoot" organized by Annie Cecelia Bill in England after Eddy's death centered on British-Israelism. Professor of religious studies John K. Simmons, citing Peel, argued that Eddy "gave the theory no real credence, at least in verifiable written form," but acknowledged British-Israelism "seemed to attract the turn-of-the-century metaphysical crowd."

== Later life and death ==
From 1888 to 1892, Eddy moved around various towns in New England, first to Barre, Vermont, then to Concord, finally ending up in a Boston suburb. In June 1892, Eddy, along with Calvin Frye and her servants, moved in to an estate named Pleasant View which she had remodeled, and where she would operate a working farm. In the opinion of biographer Caroline Fraser, Eddy became "more haughty in manner and autocratic" at Pleasant View, frequently criticizing her servants for their "ignorance of the methods of animal magnetism". Many Christian Scientists would travel to Pleasant View during this period to see Eddy, who would address them from her balcony once a year.

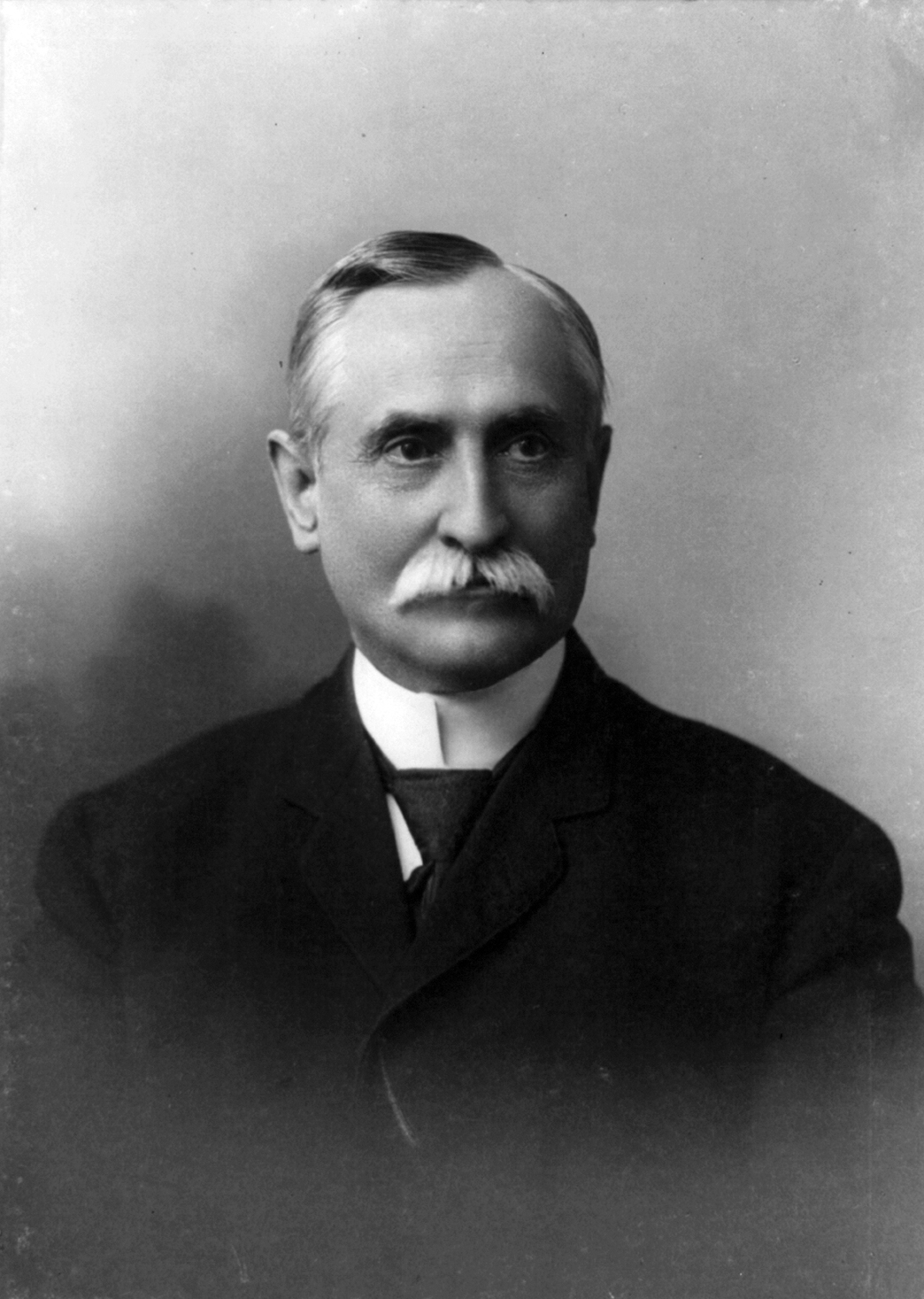
Calvin Frye, Eddy's personal secretary

=== Use of medicine ===
In Science and Health, Eddy established the principle of "radical reliance", which implied that Christian Scientists should fully eschew medicine in favor of Eddy's methods, stating that "on this fundamental point, timid conservatism is absolutely inadmissible. Only through radical reliance on Truth can scientific healing power be realized." However, as Eddy's use of medicine became public, she had to reconcile this with her doctrines, formulating several exceptions to the principle of radical reliance. On December 2, 1900, the Boston Herald reported on a lecture at the Episcopal Congress in Boston where Eddy was criticized for stating that she was able to cure bone diseases despite having gone to a dentist to have teeth pulled, to which Eddy responded in the same issue. Shortly thereafter, Eddy publicly announced that Christian Scientists would be allowed to visit dentists, a policy which remains to this day.

In 1905, Eddy wrote in a new edition of Science and Health that allowed Christian Scientists afflicted by severe pain which they were not able to treat themselves to "call a surgeon, who would give him a hypodermic injection", following bouts of severe pain as a result of kidney stones. There is controversy about how much Eddy used morphine. Biographers Ernest Sutherland Bates and Edwin Franden Dakin described Eddy as a morphine addict. Miranda Rice, a friend and close student of Eddy, told a newspaper in 1906: "I know that Mrs. Eddy was addicted to morphine in the seventies." A diary kept by Calvin Frye, Eddy's personal secretary, suggests that Eddy occasionally reverted to "the old morphine habit" when she was in pain. Gill writes that the prescription of morphine was normal medical practice at the time, and that "I remain convinced that Mary Baker Eddy was never addicted to morphine."

Eddy recommended to her son that, rather than go against the law of the state, he should have her grandchildren vaccinated. She also paid for a mastectomy for her sister-in-law. Eddy used glasses for several years for very fine print, but later said she had dispensed with them almost entirely and could read fine print with ease. In 1907, Arthur Brisbane interviewed Eddy. At one point, he picked up a periodical, selected a paragraph at random, and asked Eddy to read it. According to Brisbane, at the age of eighty-six, she read the ordinary magazine type without glasses. Towards the end of her life, she was frequently attended by physicians.

=== Next Friends lawsuit ===
In her final years, Eddy became increasingly reclusive, with sources differing on her physical state and to what extent she remained lucid during this period, which led to frequent, often embellished, rumors in the press about Eddy's behavior and well-being. In 1906, the New York World had run a story falsely asserting that Eddy was dying of cancer, with her household and finances under the control of Calvin Frye. A year later, the newspaper sponsored a lawsuit, known as "The Next Friends suit", which journalist Erwin Canham described as "designed to wrest from [Eddy] and her trusted officials all control of her church and its activities."

During the course of the legal case, four psychiatrists interviewed Eddy, then 86 years old, to determine whether she could manage her own affairs, and concluded that she was able to. Physician Allan McLane Hamilton told The New York Times that the attacks on Eddy were the result of "a spirit of religious persecution that has at last quite overreached itself", and that "there seems to be a manifest injustice in taxing so excellent and capable an old lady as Mrs. Eddy with any form of insanity."

A 1907 article in the Journal of the American Medical Association noted that Eddy exhibited hysterical and psychotic behavior. Psychiatrist Karl Menninger, in his book The Human Mind (1927), cited Eddy's paranoid delusions about malicious animal magnetism as an example of a "schizoid personality". Psychologists Leon Joseph Saul and Silas L. Warner, in their book The Psychotic Personality (1982), concluded that Eddy had diagnostic characteristics of psychotic personality disorder (PPD). In 1983, psychologists Theodore Barber and Sheryl C. Wilson suggested that Eddy displayed traits of a fantasy prone personality. Psychiatrist George Eman Vaillant wrote that Eddy was hypochondriacal. Psychopharmacologist Ronald K. Siegel has written that Eddy's lifelong secret morphine habit contributed to her development of "progressive paranoia".

=== Final years and death ===
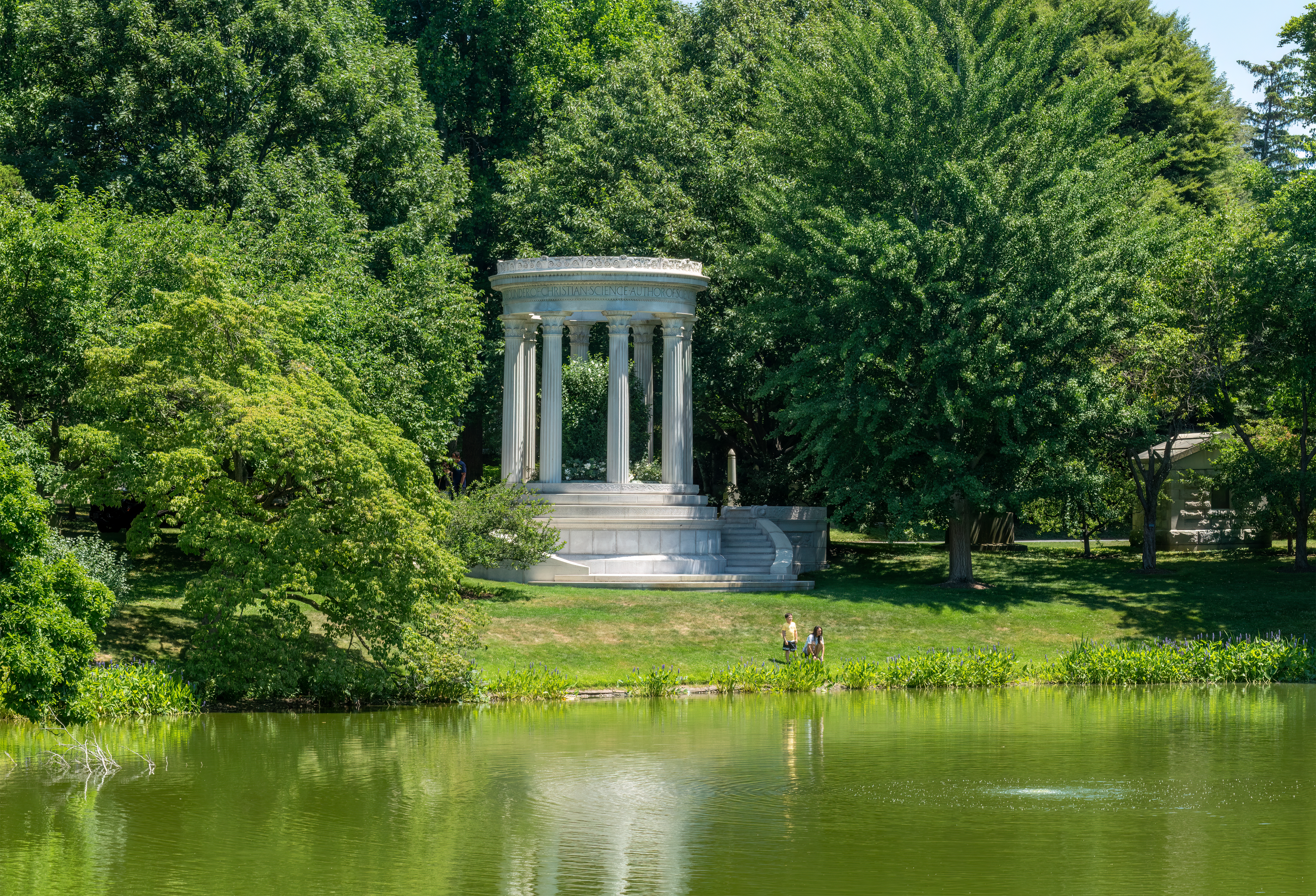
Monument to Eddy in Mount Auburn Cemetery

In 1908, concerned that her Pleasant View estate, as well as the state of New Hampshire were contaminated with malicious animal magnetism, Eddy moved in secrecy to Chestnut Hill in Massachusetts.

Eddy died of pneumonia on the evening of December 3, 1910, at her home at 400 Beacon Street, in the Chestnut Hill section of Newton, Massachusetts. Her death was announced the next morning, when a city medical examiner was called in. She was buried on December 8, 1910, at Mount Auburn Cemetery in Cambridge, Massachusetts. Her open-air mausoleum was designed by New York architect Egerton Swartwout (1870–1943).

=== Legacy ===
A bronze memorial relief of Eddy by Lynn sculptor Reno Pisano was unveiled in December 2000, at the corner of Market Street and Oxford Street in Lynn, Massachusetts, near the site of her fall in 1866.

In 1995, Eddy was elected to the National Women's Hall of Fame as the first American woman to have founded a worldwide religion.

Eddy was named one of the "100 Most Significant Americans of All Time" in 2014 by Smithsonian Magazine, and her book Science and Health with Key to the Scriptures was ranked as one of the "75 Books by Women Whose Words Have Changed the World" by the Women's National Book Association in 1992.

== Residences ==
In 1921, on the 100th anniversary of Eddy's birth, a 100-ton (in rough) and 60–70 tons (hewn) pyramid with a 121 square foot (11.2 m^{2}) footprint was dedicated on the site of her birthplace in Bow, New Hampshire. A gift from James F. Lord, it was dynamited in 1962 by order of the church's board of directors. Also demolished was Eddy's former home in Pleasant View, as the Board feared that it was becoming a place of pilgrimage. Eddy is featured on a New Hampshire historical marker (number 105) along New Hampshire Route 9 in Concord, New Hampshire.

Several of Eddy's homes are owned and maintained as historic sites by the Longyear Museum and may be visited (the list below is arranged by date of her occupancy):

- 1855–1860: Hall's Brook Road, North Groton, New Hampshire
- 1860–1862: Stinson Lake Road, Rumney, New Hampshire
- 1865–1866: 23 Paradise Road, Swampscott, Massachusetts
- 1868,1870: 277 Main Street, Amesbury, Massachusetts
- 1868–1870: 133 Central Street, Stoughton, Massachusetts
- 1875–1882: 8 Broad Street, Lynn, Massachusetts (NRHP-listed in 2021)
- 1889–1892: 62 North State Street, Concord, New Hampshire (NRHP-listed in 1982)
- 1908–1910: 400 Beacon Street, Chestnut Hill, Massachusetts (NRHP-listed in 1986)
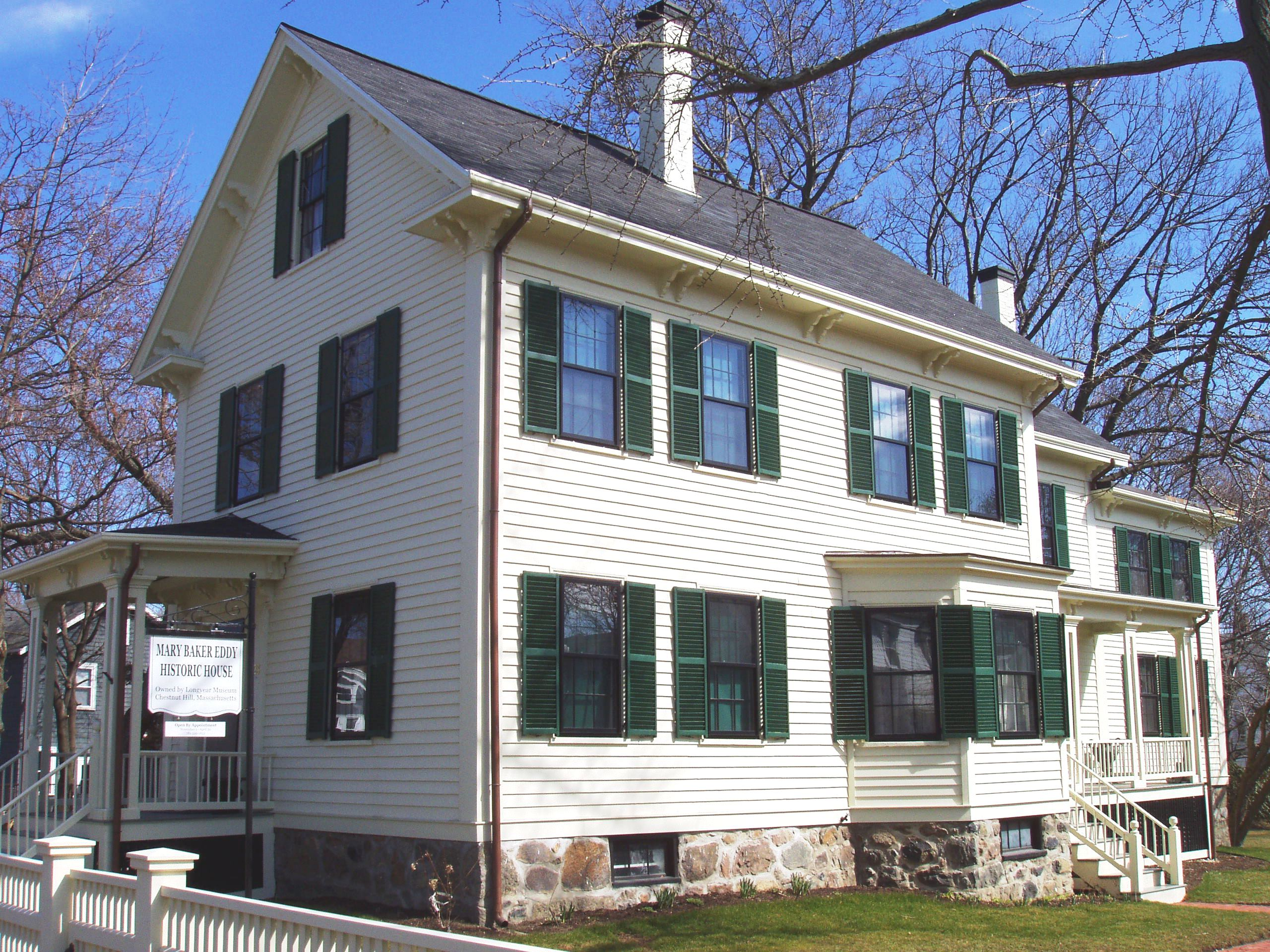
23 Paradise Road, Swampscott, Massachusetts

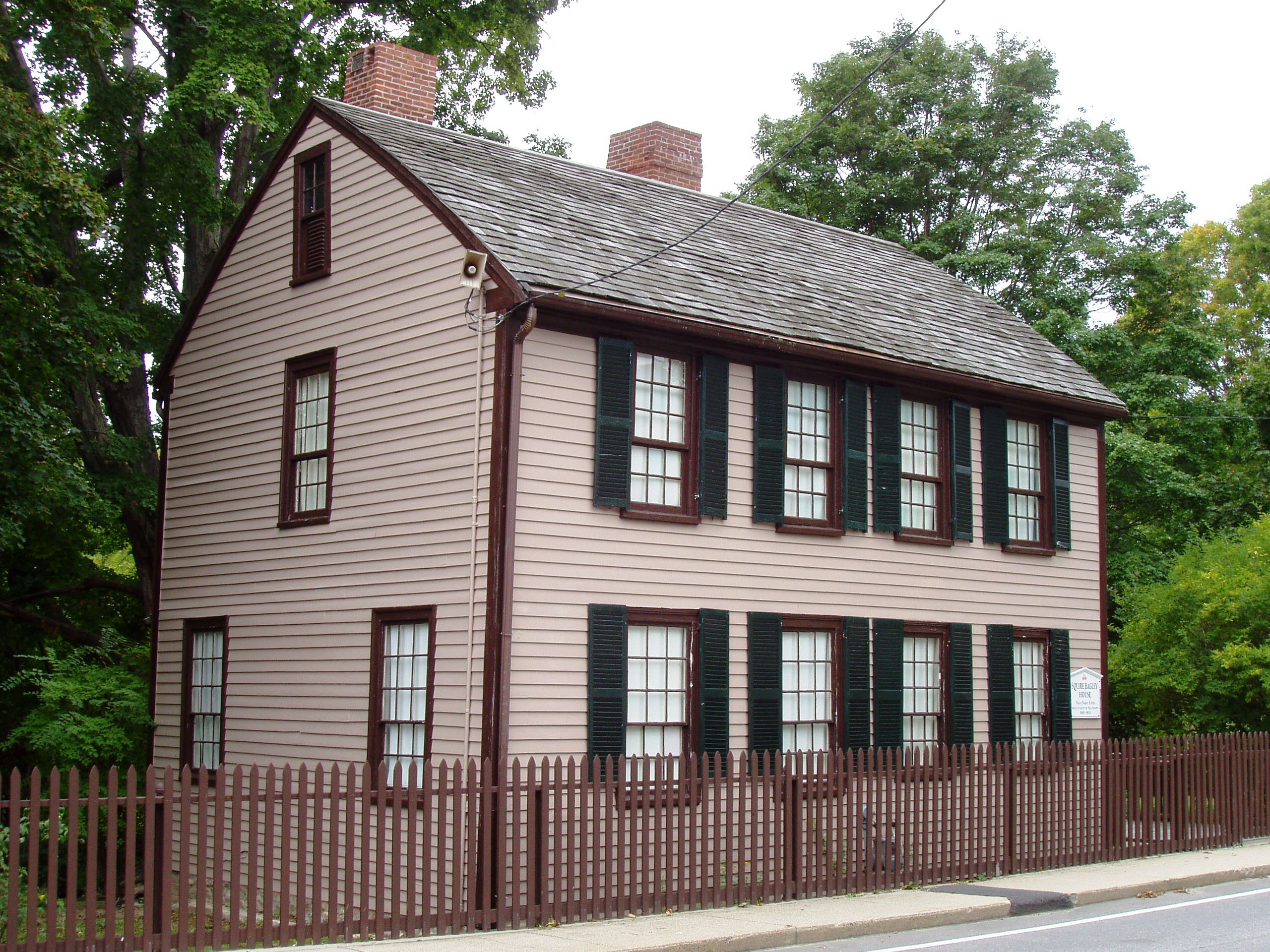
277 Main Street, Amesbury, Massachusetts

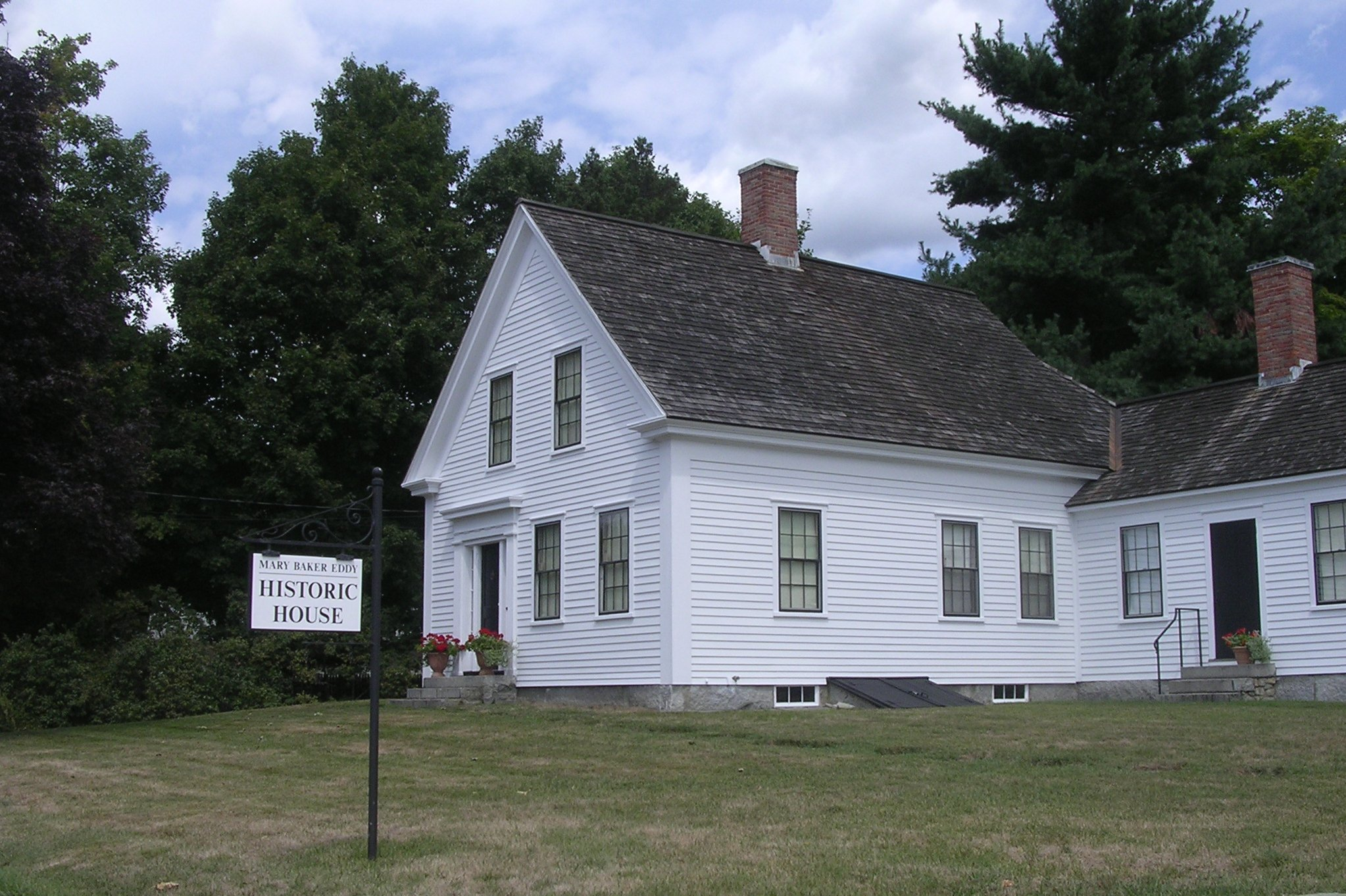
133 Central Street, Stoughton, Massachusetts

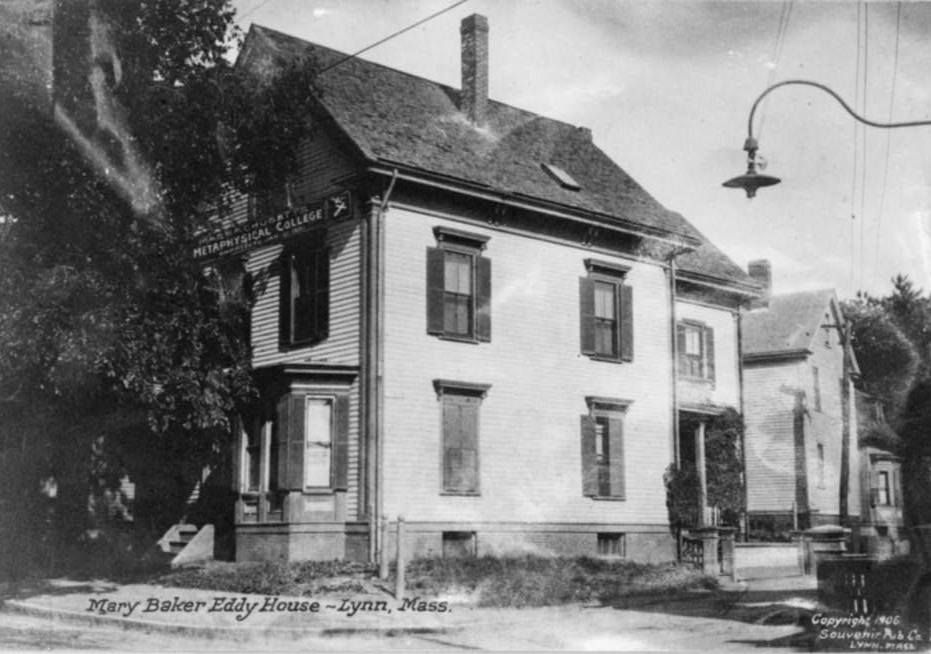
8 Broad Street, Lynn, Massachusetts

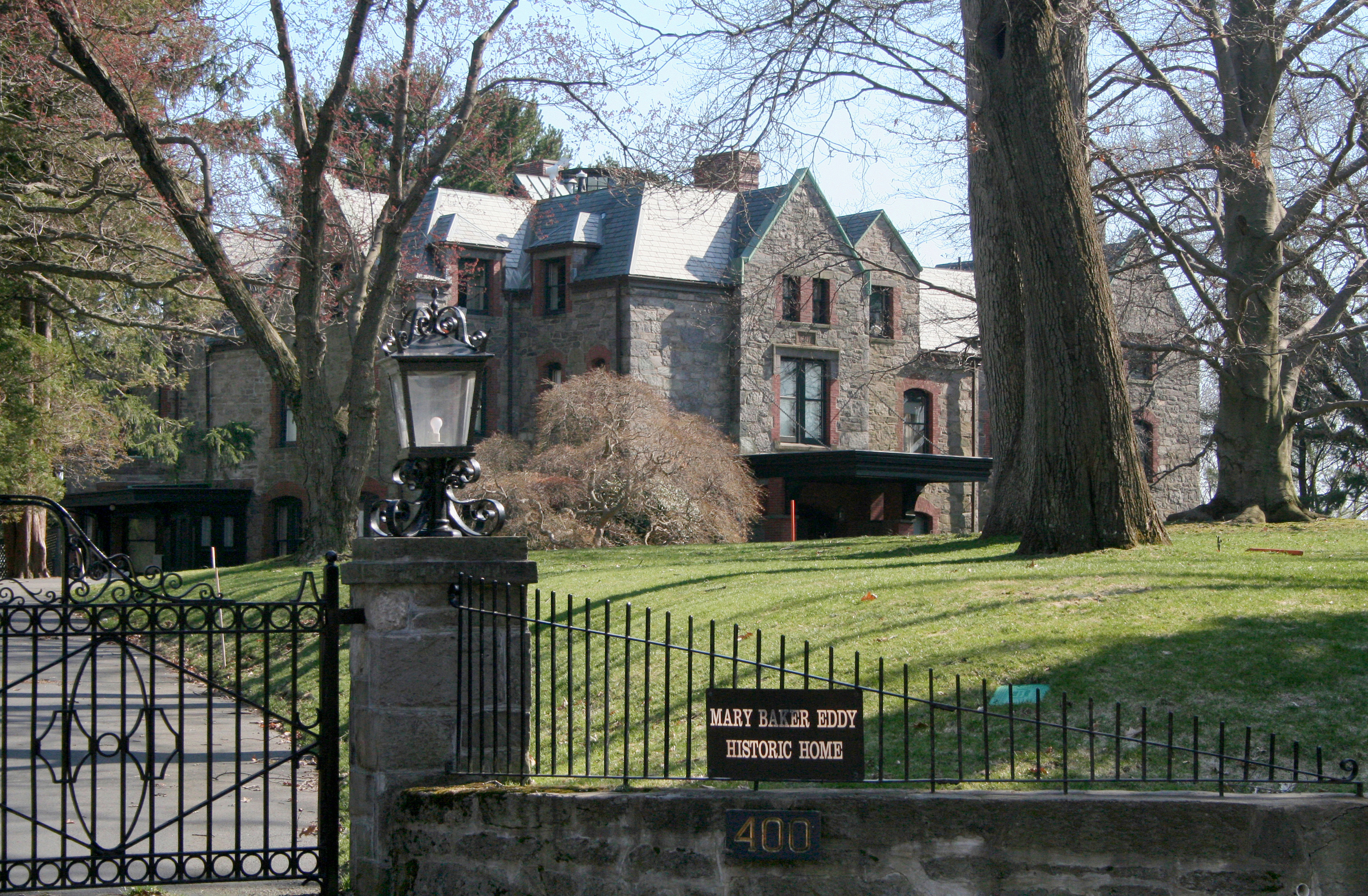
400 Beacon Street, Chestnut Hill, Massachusetts

== Selected works ==
- Science and Health with Key to the Scriptures. 1910 [1875].
- Miscellaneous Writings, 1883–1896. 1896.
- Retrospection and Introspection. Boston, Mass., W. G. Nixon. 1891.
- Unity of Good. 1887.
- Miscellaneous Writings. 1896.
- Pulpit and Press. 1895.
- Rudimental Divine Science. 1887.
- No and Yes. 1887. Archived from the original on April 6, 2015.
- Christian Science versus Pantheism. Boston, Trustees under the will of Mary Baker G. Eddy. 1898.
- Christian Healing. 1886.
- The People's Idea of God, Its Effect on Health and Christianity. 1886.
- The First Church of Christ, Scientist, and Miscellany. 1913.
- Manual of the Mother Church. 1895.
- Christ and Christmas. Boston, Mass. [Concord, N.H., E. N. Pearson, printer]. 1893.
- Message to The Mother Church for 1900. Rumford Press. 1900.
- Message to The Mother Church for 1901. 1901.
- Message to The Mother Church for 1902. 1902.
- Poems. 1910.
- Prose Works other than Science and Health with Key to the Scriptures. 1925. (Note: Posthumous collection of most of Eddy's published works besides Science and Health.)

== See also ==
- Septimus J. Hanna – American judge and Christian Science teacher (1845–1921)
- William R. Rathvon – American Christian Scientist
- Bliss Knapp – American Christian Science teacher (1877–1958)
- Augusta Emma Stetson – American religious leader
- William E. Chandler – American politician (1835–1917)
- Marietta T. Webb – American Christian Scientist (1864–1951)
- Sibyl Wilbur – American journalist and feminist author

== Sources ==
- Anonymous (1907). "Mrs. Mary Baker Eddy's Case of Hysteria". Journal of the American Medical Association. XLVIII (7).
- Albanese, Catherine L. (2007). A Republic of Mind and Spirit: A Cultural History of American Metaphysical Religion. New Haven: Yale University Press.
- Badaracco, Claire (2007). Prescribing Faith: Medicine, Media, and Religion in American Culture. Baylor University Press. ISBN 978-1-60258-075-6.
- Barkun, Michael (1997). Religion and the racist right : the origins of the Christian Identity movement. Chapel Hill, NC: University of North Carolina Press. ISBN 978-1-4696-1111-2.
- Bates, Ernest S.; Dittemore, John V. (1932). Mary Baker Eddy: The Truth and the Tradition. New York: A. A. Knopf. OCLC 1199769.
- Beasley, Norman (1963). Mary Baker Eddy. Duell, Sloan and Pearce.
- Braude, Ann (2001). Radical Spirits: Spiritualism and Women's Rights in Nineteenth-Century America. Indiana University Press.
- Brisbane, Arthur (August 1907). "An Interview with Mrs. Eddy". Cosmopolitan Magazine.
- Buchanan, Paul (2009). American Women's Rights Movement: A Chronology of Events and of Opportunities from 1600 to 2008. Branden Books.
- Canham, Erwin (1958). Commitment To Freedom: The Story of the Christian Science Monitor. Houghton Mifflin.
- Caplan, Eric (2001). Mind Games: American Culture and the Birth of Psychotherapy. University of California Press.
- Cather, Willa; Milmine, Georgine (1993) [Originally published 1909]. The Life of Mary Baker G. Eddy and the History of Christian Science. Lincoln: University of Nebraska Press. ISBN 978-0-8032-1453-8.
- Dakin, Edwin F (1929). Mrs. Eddy: The Biography of a Virginal Mind. C. Scribner's & Sons. Archived from the original on December 17, 2019 – via Questia.
- Fisher, H. A. L. (1929). Our New Religion. London: Benn.
- Frail, T. A. (November 17, 2014). "Meet the 100 Most Significant Americans of All Time". Smithsonian.
- Fraser, Caroline (1999). God's Perfect Child: Living and Dying in the Christian Science Church. Metropolitan Books. ISBN 9780805044317 – via Archive.org.
- Frerichs, Ernest S., ed. (1988). The Bible and Bibles in America. Scholars Press. ISBN 978-1-55540-096-5.
- Hall, Robert M. (1916). The Modern Siren. Our Hope.
- Haller, John S. (1981). American Medicine in Transition, 1840–1910. University of Illinois Press. ISBN 9780252008061 – via Google Books.
- Hartsook, Andrew W. (1994). Christian Science After 1910. Bookmark.
- Gallagher, Eugene; Ashcroft, Michael W. (2006). Introduction to New and Alternative Religions in America. Greenwood Publishing Group. ISBN 9780313050787 – via Google Books.
- Gardner, Martin (1993). The Healing Revelations of Mary Baker Eddy. Prometheus Books.
- Gill, Gillian (1998). Mary Baker Eddy. Da Capo Press. ISBN 978-0-7382-0042-2.
- Gottschalk, Stephen (1973). The Emergence of Christian Science in American Religious Life. University of California Press. ISBN 9780520023086.
- Gottschalk, Stephen (2006). Rolling Away the Stone: Mary Baker Eddy's Challenge to Materialism. Indiana University Press. ISBN 978-0-253-34673-5.
- Knee, Stuart E. (1994). Christian Science in the Age of Mary Baker Eddy. Greenwood Press. ISBN 978-0-313-28360-4.
- Koestler-Grack, Rachel A. (2004). Mary Baker Eddy. Facts on File. ISBN 978-0-7910-7866-2.
- Leonard, Todd Jay (2005). Talking to the Other Side. New York: iUniverse. ISBN 978-0-595-36353-7.
- Mead, Frank S. (1995). Handbook of Denominations (10th ed.). Nashville, TN: Abingdon Press. ISBN 9780687014781.
- Meehan, Michael (1908). Mrs. Eddy and the Late Suit in Equity.
- Melton, J. Gordon (1999). Religious Leaders of America: A Biographical Guide to Founders and Leaders of Religious Bodies, Churches, and Spiritual Groups in North America. Detroit: Gale Research. ISBN 9780810388789.
- Menninger, Karl (1927). The Human Mind. Garden City Publishing Company.
- Miller, Timothy (1995). America's Alternative Religions. State University of New York.
- Moore, R. Laurence (1986). Religious Outsiders and the Making of Americans. Oxford University Press. ISBN 978-0-19-536399-9.
- Moreman, Christopher M. (2013). The Spiritualist Movement: Speaking with the Dead in America and Around the World. Vol. 1: American Origins and Global Proliferation. Praeger. ISBN 978-0-313-39947-3.
- Nenneman, Richard A. (1997). Persistent Pilgrim: The Life of Mary Baker Eddy. Nebbadoon Press. ISBN 978-1-891331-02-2.
- "List of Markers by Marker Number" (PDF). nh.gov. New Hampshire Division of Historical Resources. November 2, 2018.
- Norton, Carol (1904). The Christian Science Church, Its Organization and Policy: The History of the Apostolic Church and the Formation of the Christian Science Church Compared. Christian Science Publishing Society.
- "Dr. Alan McLane Hamilton Tells About His Visit to Mrs. Eddy; After a Month's Investigation Famous Alienist Considers Leader of Christian Scientists "Absolutely Normal and Possessed of Remarkably Clear Intellect"". The New York Times. August 25, 1907.
- "Mrs. Eddy Dies of Pneumonia; No Doctor Near". The New York Times. December 5, 1910.
- "Eddy Centenary Observed at Bow". The New York Times. Concord, NH. July 17, 1921.
- Oakley, Adeline (June 2015). "75 Books by Women Whose Words Have Changed the World" (PDF).
- Peel, Robert (1966). Mary Baker Eddy: The Years of Discovery. Holt, Rinehart and Winston.
- Peel, Robert (1971). Mary Baker Eddy: The Years of Trial. Holt, Rinehart and Winston. ISBN 978-0-03-086700-2.
- Peel, Robert (1977). Mary Baker Eddy: The Years of Authority. Holt, Rinehart and Winston. ISBN 978-0-03-021081-5.
- Peel, Robert (February 1980). Mary Baker Eddy: The Years of Authority. Henry Holt & Company, Inc. ISBN 978-0-03-056709-4.
- Podmore, Frank (1909). Mesmerism and Christian Science: A Short History of Mental Healing. George W. Jacobs and Company.
- Powell, Lyman Pierson (1930). Mary Baker Eddy: A Life Size Portrait. MacMillan, Christian Science Publishing Society. (Reprinting)
- Rapport, Jeremy (2015). "The Nature of Reality: Christian Science and Spiritualism". In Guttierez, Cathy (ed.). Handbook of Spiritualism and Channeling. Leiden: Brill. pp. 199–218. doi:10.1163/9789004264083_011. ISBN 978-90-04-26408-3.
- Safronoff, Cindy (February 5, 2016). "The fall that led to the rise of Mary Baker Eddy". Crossing Swords. Archived from the original on April 13, 2016.
- Saul, Leon; Warner, Silas (1982). The Psychotic Personality. Van Nostrand Reinhold.
- Shippey, Kim (January 29, 2001). "City of "firsts" Lynn, Massachusetts, honors Mary Baker Eddy". Christian Science Sentinel.
- Siegel, Ronald K. (1994). Whispers: The Voices of Paranoia. Simon & Schuster.
- Silberger, Julius (1980). Mary Baker Eddy: An Interpretive Biography of the Founder of Christian Science. Boston: Little, Brown. ISBN 978-0-316-79090-1.
- Simmons, John K. (1991). "Charisma and Covenant: The Christian Science Movement in its Initial Postcharismatic Phase". when Prophets Die: The Postcharismatic Fate of New Religious Movements. Albany, NY: State University of New York Press. ISBN 978-0-7914-0717-2.
- Singhal, Damodar (1980). Modern Indian Society and Culture. Meenakshi Prakashan.
- Smith, C.P. (1920). "Eddy, Mary Baker" . Encyclopedia Americana. Vol. IX.
- Springer, Fleta Campbell (1930). According to the Flesh: A Biography of Mary Baker Eddy. Coward-McCann.
- Squires, L. Ashley (2017). Healing the Nation: Literature, Progress, and Christian Science (Kindle ed.). Indiana University Press.
- Stark, Rodney (1988). "The Rise and Fall of Christian Science". Journal of Contemporary Religion. 13 (2): 189–214. doi:10.1080/13537909808580830.
- Thomas, Wendell (1930). Hinduism Invades America. The Beacon Press. pp. 228–234.
- Vaillant, George (1992). Ego Mechanisms of Defense: A Guide for Clinicians and Researchers. American Psychiatric Press.
- Whorton, James C. (2004). Nature Cures: The History of Alternative Medicine in America. Oxford University Press. ISBN 978-0-19-517162-4.
- Wilbur, Silby (1913). "Mesmerism Dominant" . The Life of Mary Baker Eddy. The Christian Science Publishing Society – via Wikisource. [scan ]
- Williams, Jean Kinney (1997). The Christian Scientists. New York: Franklin Watts. ISBN 9780531113097.
- Williams, William (2000). Encyclopedia of Pseudoscience: From Alien Abductions to Zone Therapy. Facts on File.
- Wilson, Bryan R. (1961). Sects and Society: A Sociological Study of the Elim Tabernacle, Christian Science, and Christadelphians. University of California Press – via Google Books.
- Wilson, Sheryl C; Barber, Theodore X (1983). "The Fantasy-Prone Personality". In Sheikh, Anees A. (ed.). Imagery: Current Theory, Research and Application. New York: John Wiley & Sons. pp. 340–387.
- Wortham, Hugh Evelyn (1930). Three Women: St. Teresa, Madame de Choiseul, Mṛṣ Eddy. Little, Brown and Co.
- "What did Eddy say about Eastern thought systems?". Mary Baker Eddy Library. September 18, 2023.
