= Christian Science Reading Room =

Place where the public can access Christian Science literature

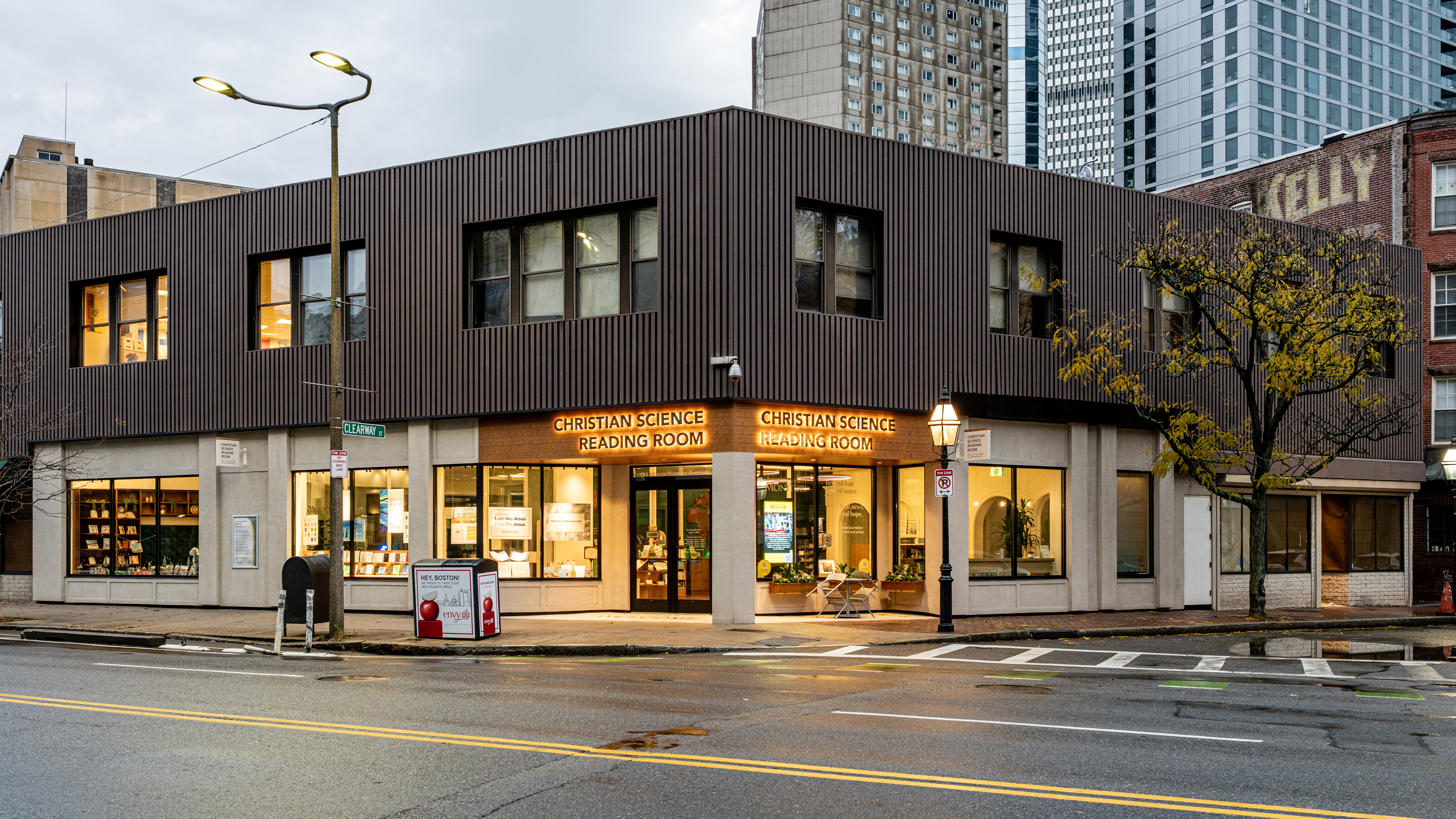
A Christian Science Reading Room adjacent to The Mother Church in Boston

A Christian Science Reading Room is a facility operated as a public service by a Christian Science church in the community where that church exists. The local branches of the mother church (The First Church of Christ, Scientist) in Boston, Massachusetts, maintain these rooms as a place where one may study and contemplate the Bible and Christian Science literature in a quiet atmosphere, similar to a library.

Literature and other items related to the study of Christian Science may be borrowed or purchased. There are approximately 2,000 Christian Science Reading Rooms worldwide.

== Background and purpose ==
Reading Rooms were established in 1899 by a by-law in the Manual of The Mother Church, the book which governs the Christian Science church. They were created to provide both a quiet place for reading, study and prayer and a means for the public to come into contact with Christian Science. They also offer Christian Science books, periodicals, and other media for sale.

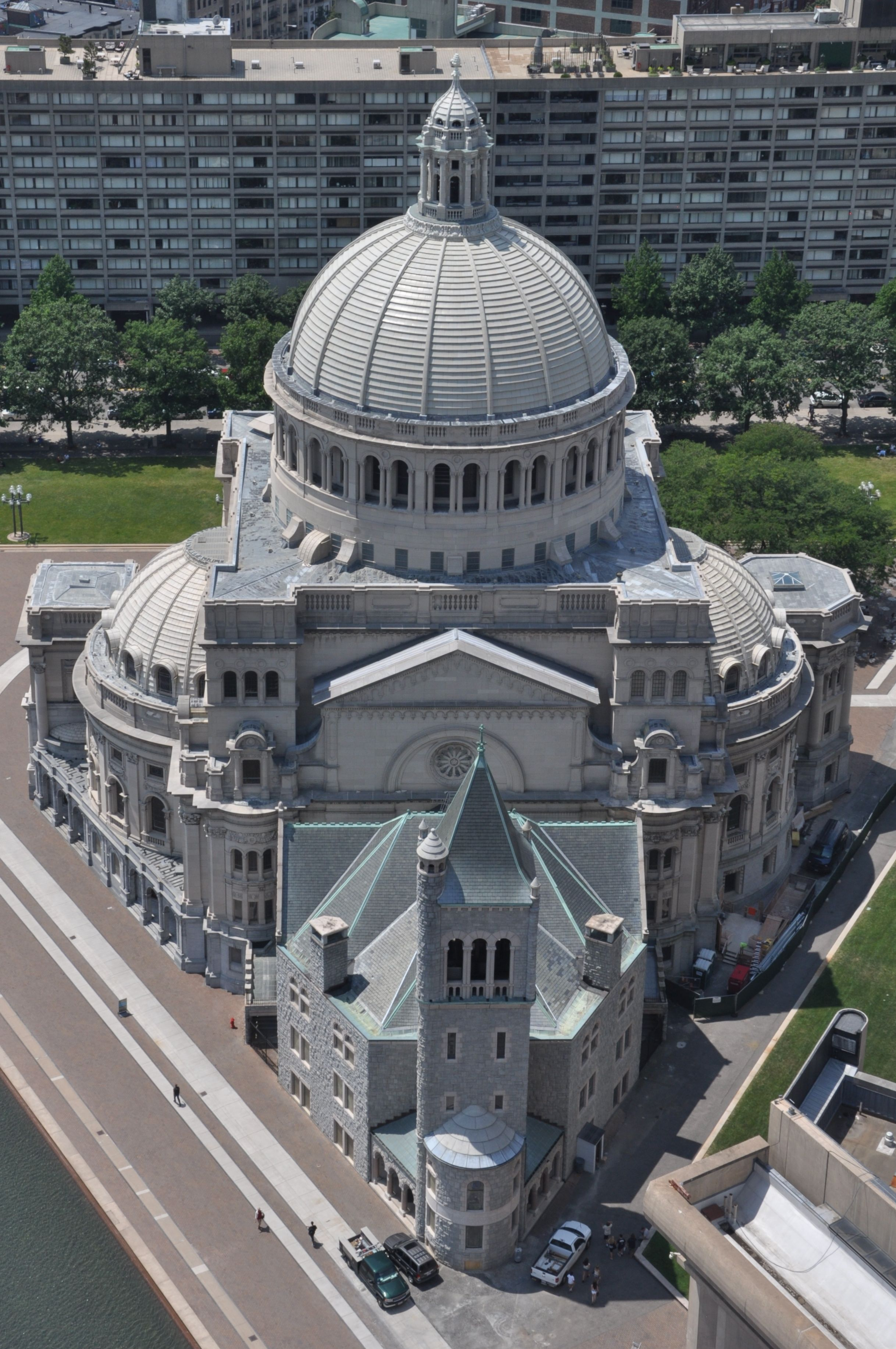
The First Church of Christ, Scientist. The original Mother Church (1894) is in the foreground and behind it is the Mother Church Extension (1906).

Eleven years before the Manual by-law, there was an earlier concept of reading room and a dispensary of literature and services for those unable to afford to pay for Christian Science treatment or transportation to a Christian Science church. In Boston, these efforts were halted in 1894 to concentrate on building the original Mother Church. (Note: The large domed church is the extension to the original Mother Church, which is smaller and located in the corner of the triangular property.)

Both library and bookstore, it is a "harbor of rest" for quiet meditation and prayer, where one may study or purchase the Bible and the church's denominational textbook, Science and Health with Key to the Scriptures written by Mary Baker Eddy, who is known as the Discoverer and Founder of Christian Science. Also available are the denomination's other main books, the King James Version of the Bible and Prose Works, a volume of collected works also written by Eddy. (Note: Prose Works is only published in English. In other languages, the individual books comprising Prose Works are published individually. The translated writings of Mary Baker Eddy are double in volume because they are published as bilingual books with the original English on the left, the translation on the right.) Also available are the denomination's religious periodicals: a monthly publication, The Christian Science Journal; the weekly Christian Science Sentinel; The Herald of Christian Science, published for speakers of languages other than English; and the Christian Science Quarterly, used worldwide to study the religion's Bible "lesson-sermons".

In addition, there are various religious pamphlets and audio recordings, as well as The Christian Science Monitor, an international newspaper. Reading rooms in countries that speak other languages often have a limited stock of English-language reading material; those in large cities in anglophone countries usually stock books and periodicals in one or more foreign languages.

Reading rooms are often storefronts in a busy part of a city, though some are situated within the local church's building. Hours of business vary from reading room to reading room; some are open during regular retail business hours, others less frequently. The person working there is called a "librarian", indicative of the atmosphere to be found. Reading rooms are staffed by members of the local Christian Science church.

Jointly-maintained reading rooms (operated jointly by several Christian Science churches) operate in a number of locations, for example a jointly maintained room in John Street, New York City, is maintained by the Christian Science branch churches of New York, Connecticut and New Jersey; and one in the San Francisco International Airport is supported by 10 different local churches.

Reading Rooms may hold events, such as bible study groups, and may offer resources to help homeless populations in their city.

== In popular culture ==
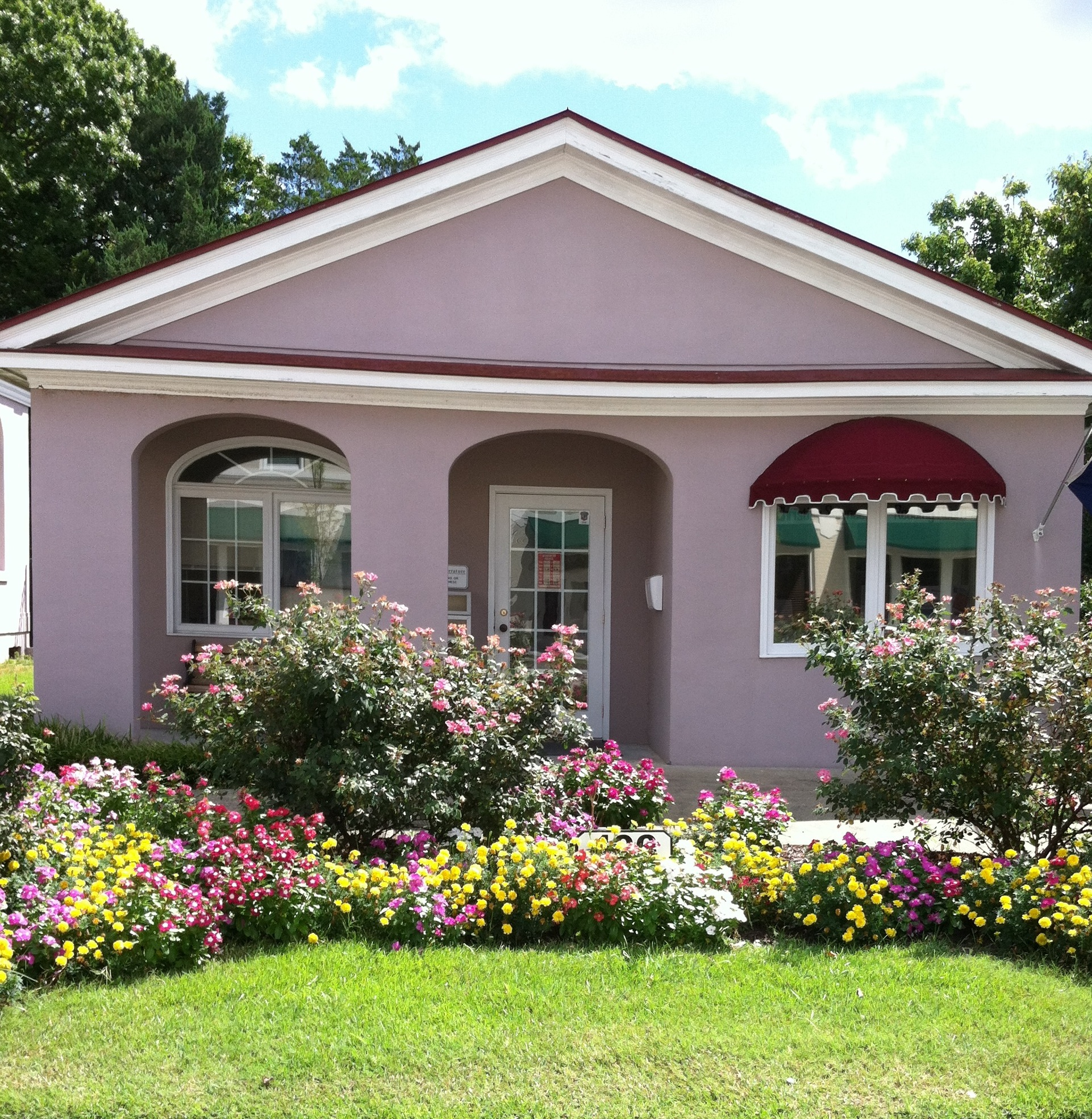
A Christian Science Reading Room in New Bern, North Carolina, U.S.

In many parts of the U.S., Christian Science Reading Rooms are ubiquitous parts of the downtown landscape. A book by Kristin Hahn speaks of "Breezing by the Christian Science Reading Rooms prominently centered on main streets all across America."

Novelists use them to characterize respectable-but-prosaic commercial districts. A mystery novel by Loren D. Estleman characterizes the location of a detective office by putting it among a beauty school, a plumbing supply store, "a hearing-aid shop, [and] a Christian Science reading room next to a medical supply outlet." A fictional cop in a novel by Peter Plate steers a patrol car "past Siegal's Tuxedo Shop, Queen's Shoes, Discoteca Latina, The Eggroll Express, The Christian Science Reading Room, and Duc Loi's Meat and Fish Company." The Simpsons' fictional town of Springfield contains one.
