= List of works by Oscar Browning =

This is a list of the published works of Oscar Browning, teacher, historian and educationalist, whose active life extended from the mid-Victorian period to the 1920s. The list is incomplete. As well as authoring numerous books, Browning edited and wrote prefaces to other works, and was a copious contributor of articles and reviews which appeared in a range of journals and newspapers, a sample of which are included here. The main source is the partial bibliography included in the 1956 edition of H. E. Wortham's biography.

Browning's main works were historical, but he also wrote on educational matters and literary biography, including a well-regarded Life of George Eliot. Late in life he completed two volumes of memoirs.

== Works ==
=== History ===
==== Books ====
- The Netherlands in the sixteenth century: a lecture delivered at Eton College. London: publisher not stated. 1869. OCLC 48695147.
- (Joint editor) Historical Handbooks (9 volumes). London: Rivingtons. 1873–84. OCLC 558228374.
- Modern England, 1820–1874. New York: Harper & Bros. 1878. OCLC 41009108. (later updated to 1885)
- Modern France, 1814–1879. London: Longmans. 1880. OCLC 457166276.
- (Editor) Political Memoranda of Francis, Fifth Duke of Leeds. London: The Camden Society. 1884.
- (Editor) The Despatches of Earl Gower, English Ambassador at Paris June 1790 to August 1792. London: Sutherland. 1885.
- (Editor) England and Napoleon in 1803, Being the Despatches of Lord Whitworth and Others. London: Longmans, Green. 1887. OCLC 312161462.
- The New Illustrated History of England (4 vols.). London: Virtue. 1888–1893. OCLC 64774674.
- Modern England, 1815–1885. London: Publisher not stated. 1889. OCLC 644194415. (updated from 1878 edition)
- (Editor) The Evolutionary History of England, its People and Institutions. london: pitman. 1902. OCLC 978049173.
- The Life of Bartolomeo Colleoni of Anjou and Burgundy. London: The Arundel Society. 1891. OCLC 252943115.
- The Flight to Varennes and other historical essays. London: Swan Sonnenschein. 1892.}
- Guelphs and Ghibellines: A Short History of Mediaeval Italy from 1250–1409. London: Methuen. 1893. OCLC 853882763.
- The Citizen, His Rights and Responsibilities. London: Blackie & co. 1893.
- The Age of the Condottieri: A Short History of Mediaeval Italy from 1409–1530. London: Methuen. 1895. OCLC 4015356.
- (Editor) The Journal of Sir George Rooke, Admiral of the Fleet, 1700-1702. London: Navy Records Society. 1897. OCLC 769257233.
- Peter the Great. London: Hutchinson & Co. 1898. OCLC 558228539.
- Charles XII of Sweden. London: Hurst & Blackett. 1899. OCLC 315341297.
- (Introduction) Woodrow Wilson: The State: Elements of Historical and Practical Politics. London: Ibister & Co. 1900. OCLC 8771715.
- The History of Europe in outline, 1814-1848, from the Restoration of the Bourbons to the Fall of the Monarchy of July. London: Macmillan. 1901. OCLC 11706765.
- Wars and the Development of Military Science. London: W & R Chambers. 1903. OCLC 907949876.
- The Foreign Policy of Pitt to the Outbreak of War with France. London: Publisher not stated. 1904. OCLC 558228348.
- Napoleon, the First Phase: Some Chapters on the Boyhood and Youth of Bonaparte, 1769–1793. London: John Lane. 1905. OCLC 1017279594.
- (Preface) Alexander Keiland: Napoleon's Men and Methods. London: A. Owen & Co. 1907.
- The Fall of Napoleon. London: John Lane. 1907. OCLC 558228341. '
- (Editor) Despatches from Paris, 1784-1790, selected and edited from the Foreign Office correspondence. London: The Society. 1910. OCLC 458913106.
- A History of the Modern World, 1815–1910. Cassell and Co. 1912. OCLC 699084967.
- A General History of the World. London: Edward Arnold. 1915.
- A Short History of Italy, 375-1915. Rome: P. Maglione & C. Strini. 1917. OCLC 755059835.

==== Articles ====
- Browning, Oscar (1885). "The Triple Alliance of 1788". Transactions of the Royal Historical Society. 2: 77–96. doi:10.2307/3677861. JSTOR 3677861. OCLC 28674447. S2CID 154485974.
- Browning, Oscar (1885). "The Treaty of Commerce between England and France in 1786". Transactions of the Royal Historical Society. 2 (4): 349–64. doi:10.2307/3677876. JSTOR 3677876. OCLC 28675071. S2CID 153776677.
- Browning, Oscar (1886). "The Flight of Louis XVI to Varennes; a criticism of Carlyle". Transactions of the Royal Historical Society. 3 (3): 319–41. doi:10.2307/3677850. JSTOR 3677850. OCLC 36059789. S2CID 194103773.
- Browning, Oscar (1889). "Hugh Elliot in Berlin". Transactions of the Royal Historical Society. 4: 85–101. doi:10.2307/3678162. JSTOR 3678162. OCLC 28676686. S2CID 161537330.
- Browning, Oscar (1892). "The Evolution of the Family". Transactions of the Royal Historical Society. 6: 87–107. doi:10.2307/3678191. JSTOR 3678191. OCLC 28678625. S2CID 178663109.
- Browning, Oscar (1897). "The Conference of Pillnitz". Transactions of the Royal Historical Society. 11: 133–38. doi:10.2307/3678218. JSTOR 3678218. OCLC 28678612. S2CID 179001356.

=== Educational: books, pamphlets, articles ===
- "On Science Teaching in Schools". Chemical News and Journal of Physical Science (17): 243–44. 22 May 1868.
- Cornelius Nepos with English notes. Oxford: Clarendon Press. 1868.
- "The Study of Archæology in Schools". The Fortnightly Review. London: Chapman & Hall. October 1874. OCLC 27658400.
- An Introduction to the History of Educational Theories. London: Kegan Paul Trench. 1881. OCLC 1006030851.
- (Editor) John Milton: Milton's Tractate on Education. Cambridge: Cambridge University Press. 1883.
- The Training of Universities of the Public servants of the State. Cambridge: Cambridge University Press. 1884. OCLC 27274696. (booklet)
- "Cambridge". English Illustrated Magazine. October 1886. OCLC 48695108.
- The Teaching of History in Schools. London: Longmans Green. 1887. OCLC 48703580. (An address delivered at the Royal History Society, 22 October 1877, subsequently published together with a report of the conference on the teaching of history in schools)
- (Contributor) Aspects of Education: A Study in the History of Pedagogy ed. Nicholas Murray Butler. New York: Industrial Education Association. 1888. OCLC 505737152.
- The Proposed New Historical Tripos. London: Spottiswoode & Co. 1897. OCLC 48703573.
- (Preface) J.F. Herbart: Letters and Lectures on Education. London: Swan Sonnenschein. 1898.
- (Co-editor) Macmillan's Manuals for Teachers. London: Macmillan. 1899–1904. OCLC 558229064.
- (Preface) J.F. Herbart:The Science of Education (PDF). Boston, MA: D.C. Heath & Co. 1902.

=== Literary works and memoirs ===
- Life of George Eliot. London: Walter Scott. 1890. OCLC 697172.
- Dante: His Life and Writings. London: Swan Sonnenschein. 1891. OCLC 2351751.
- Goethe, his Life and Writings. London: Swan Sonnenschein. 1892. OCLC 977752091.
- (Introduction) Robert Browning: Poems. London: G. Routledge & Sons. 1897. OCLC 557354770.
- (Introduction) Robert Browning: Dramas. London: G. Routledge & Sons. 1898. OCLC 926098678.
- John Keats. London: Royal Society of Literature. 1901. OCLC 48695143. Reproduced from an article in Transactions of the Royal Society of Literature, volume XXII, 2nd series.
- Impressions of Indian Travel. London: Hodder & Stoughton. 1903. OCLC 558228422.
- Memories of Sixty Years at Eton, Cambridge and Elsewhere. London: John Lane. 1910. OCLC 558228480.
- Memories of Later Years. London: T. Fisher Unwin. 1923. OCLC 558228472.
