= Reuben Foster House and Perley Cleaves House =

Historic houses in New Hampshire, United States

- Reuben Foster House and Cleaves
- U.S. National Register of Historic Places
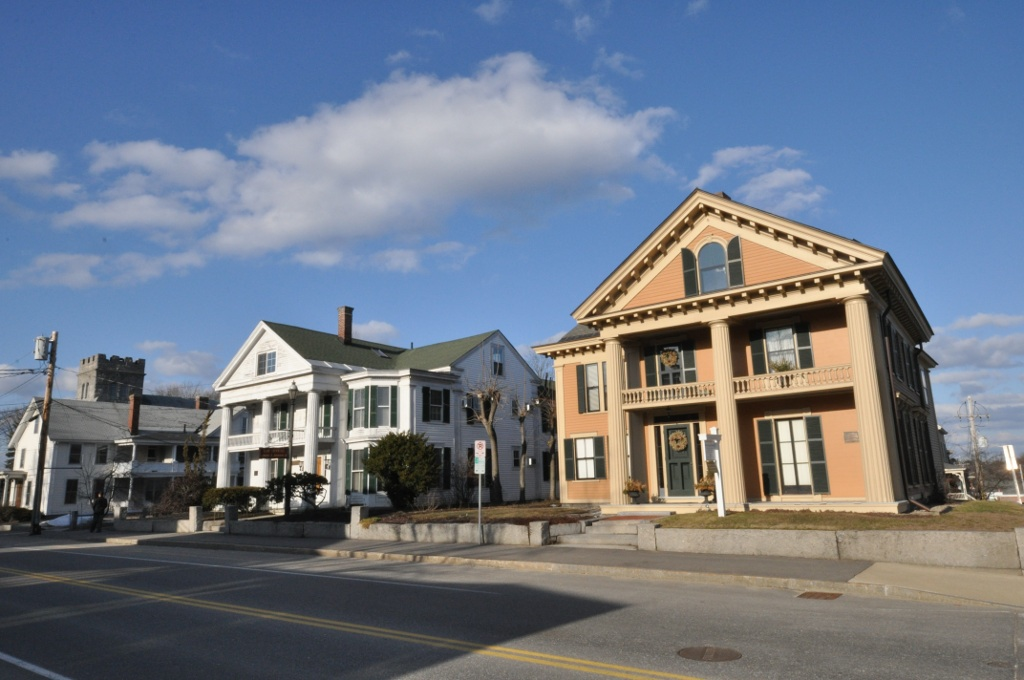
- The Foster house is on the left, the Cleaves house on the right

- Location within New Hampshire Location within the United States
- Location: 64 and 62 N. State St., Concord, New Hampshire
- Coordinates: 43°12′35″N 71°32′27″W
- Area: 0.4 acres (0.16 ha)
- Built: 1848
- Architectural style: Greek Revival
- NRHP reference No.: 82001690
- Added to NRHP: March 15, 1982

The Reuben Foster House and Perley Cleaves House are a pair of nearly identical Greek Revival houses at 64 and 62 North State Street in Concord, New Hampshire. Built 1848–1850, they are among New Hampshire's best examples of Greek Revival architecture, having undergone only relatively modest alterations. The houses were listed on the National Register of Historic Places in 1982. The Cleaves House is further notable for its association with Mary Baker Eddy, and now serves as a historic house museum.

== Description and history ==
The Reuben Foster and Perley Cleaves Houses are located north of downtown Concord, on the east side North State Street at its junction with Court Street. The basic plans of these two houses, which were built as investments in the 1840s, are mirror images of each other. Each is a 2 1/2-story wood-frame building, with a rectangular main block and a projecting side ell. The front facade of each house has a projecting gable supported by three two-story fluted Doric columns, with a porch accessible from the second floor. The main entrance is flanked by full-length sidelight windows and pilasters. The Foster house has had an addition built in the corner between the main block and the ell, which includes a projecting bay window on the front facade. The Cleaves house has a somewhat more decorated facade: the cornice is deeper than that of the Foster house, and it is studded with brackets. The gable end has a full round-arch window, while that of the Foster house has a rectangular window with a round fanlight decoration.

These two houses are among about a dozen known in the state that have relatively high-style Greek Revival design. The northern house was first owned by Reuben Foster, and remained in his family until 1938, the family making few significant alterations beyond the addition of the bay windows. It presently houses professional offices. The Cleaves House has had a larger number of owners, including former Governor of New Hampshire Matthew Harvey and Mary Baker Eddy, founder of the First Church of Christ, Scientist. Edward and Beth Long, two students of Bliss Knapp, bought the house in 1955. In 1985, the Longs gifted the house to Longyear Museum, dedicated to Eddy's life history, which restored it to the period of her occupancy, 1889–1892.

== See also ==
- National Register of Historic Places listings in Merrimack County, New Hampshire
