= Stephen Gottschalk =

- Born: c. 1941; Beverley Hills, California
- Died: January 10, 2005; Boston, Massachusetts
- Occupation: Historian

Academic background
- Education: Occidental College (BA); University of California, Berkeley (MA, PhD)
- Thesis: The Emergence of Christian Science in American Religious Life, 1885–1910 (1969)

Academic work
- Discipline: American religion
- Sub-discipline: Christian Science, New Thought, new religious movements

Stephen Gottschalk (c. 1941 – January 10, 2005) was a historian of American religion focusing on the Christian Science church, also known as the Church of Christ, Scientist. A lifelong Christian Scientist, Gottschalk worked from 1978 until 1990 for the church's Committee on Publication in Boston, however, he became critical of the church organization in the 1990s.

Gottschalk was best known as the author of The Emergence of Christian Science in American Religious Life (1973) and Rolling Away the Stone: Mary Baker Eddy's Challenge to Materialism (2005).

== Background ==
Born in Beverley Hills, California, Gottschalk graduated from Harvard School, a former military school in Los Angeles. He attended Occidental College where he was one of the first recipients of the newly established annual Student Award Lecture, with a lecture on "Art and the American Vision". He obtained a BA in 1962 from Occidental College, and an MA in 1963 and a PhD in history in 1969 from the University of California, Berkeley. His PhD thesis was The emergence of Christian science in American religious life, 1885–1910; the thesis became his first book, published in 1973. Martin E. Marty reviewed the book saying it "should remain a standard work on Christian Science formation and its relative acceptance in America for years to come." From 1967 to 1975 he was an assistant, then associate, professor of history in the department of government and humanities at the Naval Postgraduate School in Monterey, California.

Gottschalk published articles on Christian Science in several encyclopedias and journals, including The Christian Century, Theology Today, and the Union Seminary Quarterly Review. From 1978 until 1990, Gottschalk worked for the Christian Science church's Committee on Publication in Boston, but left after a disagreement about the church's direction. In 1989 he gave an interview to U.S. News & World Report in which he said the church had become "worldly"; he was concerned about the amount of money it had spent during the 1980s on radio and television services. In March 1990, he told the church's board of directors that he believed it was suppressing internal dissent, and left his position shortly afterwards. From then until his death he worked as an independent scholar. In the 1990s he led a group known as the Mailing Fund which published documents critical of the church.

In 2006 his final work, Rolling Away the Stone: Mary Baker Eddy's Challenge to Materialism, was published through Indiana University Press posthumously, it analyzed many of the controversies of Eddy's last two decades in what Mary Bednarowski called "a major contribution" to the effort to understand Eddy's life and theology.

== Selected works ==
- Rolling Away the Stone: Mary Baker Eddy's Challenge to Materialism, Indiana University Press, 2005.
- "Christian Science and Harmonialism," in Lippy and Williams, eds., Encyclopedia of the American Religious Experience: Studies of Traditions and Movements, Charles Scribner's Sons, 1988.
- ""Theodicy after Auschwitz and the Reality of God," Union Seminary Quarterly Review, 1987, nos. 3–4, pp. 77–91.
- "Christian Science" and "Mary Baker Eddy," in Mircea Eliade, ed., The Encyclopedia of Religion, Collier Macmillan, 1987.
- "Critic's Corner: Update on Christian Science," Theology Today, April 1987, pp. 111–115.
- "Christian Science Today: Resuming the Dialogue," Christian Century, 17 December 1986, pp. 1146–1148.
- The Emergence of Christian Science in American Religious Life, University of California Press, 1973.
- Essays in American Naturalism, Occidental College, 1962.
