= Prose Works other than Science and Health with Key to the Scriptures =

Compendium of books by Mary Baker Eddy

Prose Works other than Science and Health with Key to the Scriptures, sometimes called Prose Works other than Science and Health or simply Prose Works, is a single-volume compendium of the major works of Mary Baker Eddy, the founder of Christian Science, outside of her main work, Science and Health with Key to the Scriptures. Also not included are Eddy's Church Manual, Poems, and Christ and Christmas. The books included in Prose Works were never published together as a single volume during her lifetime but were assembled as a convenience around 1925. When published it became the most popular book printed by the Christian Science Publishing Society besides Science and Health and the Church Manual. The constituent books have historically been published individually in parallel also. It has been issued in both hardcover and paperback.

== Contents ==
The volume consists of the following works:

- Miscellaneous Writings 1883-1896 (Miscellaneous Writings for short, abbreviated in concordances as Mis.)
- Retrospection and Introspection (abbreviated as Ret.)
- Unity of Good (abbreviated as Un.)
- Pulpit and Press (abbreviated as Pul.)
- Rudimental Divine Science (abbreviated as Rud.)
- No and Yes (abbreviated as No.)
- Christian Science versus Pantheism (abbreviated as Pan.)
- Message to The Mother Church, 1900 (Message for 1900 for short, abbreviated as '00)
- Message to The Mother Church, 1901 (Message for 1901 for short, abbreviated as '01)
- Message to The Mother Church, 1902 (Message for 1902 for short, abbreviated as '02)
- Christian Healing: A Sermon Delivered at Boston (abbreviated as Hea.)
- The People's Idea of God: Its Effect on Health and Christianity (secondary title usually omitted; abbreviated as Peo.)
- The First Church of Christ, Scientist, and Miscellany (abbreviated as My.)
