= Hugh Evelyn Wortham =

English biographer, journalist, music critic and writer

Hugh Evelyn Wortham (7 May 1884 – 9 July 1959), best known as H. E. Wortham was an English biographer, journalist, music critic and writer.

Wortham was educated at King's College, Cambridge and received an MA in 1921. He worked as a foreign correspondent, editor and journalist in Egypt, 1909–1919. From 1934 until his death he wrote articles in the 'London Day by Day' column under the pseudonym 'Peterborough' in the Daily Telegraph.

Wortham was the nephew of Oscar Browning. In June 1923 Browning sent a letter to Wortham requesting him to write a biography about his life. In 1927, he authored a biography of Browning. It was reprinted and revised in 1956 under the title Victorian Eton and Cambridge: Being the Life and Times of Oscar Browning.

== Publications ==
- A Musical Odyssey (1924)
- Oscar Browning (1927)
- Mustapha Kemal of Turkey (1930)
- Three Women: St. Teresa, Madame de Choiseul, Mrs. Eddy (1930)
- Edward VII, Man and King (1931)
- The Delightful Profession: Edward VII, a Study in Kingship (1931)
- Chinese Gordon (1933)
- Gordon: An Intimate Portrait (1933)
- Victorian Eton and Cambridge: Being the Life and Times of Oscar Browning (1956)
