= List of Mountain Men episodes =

Mountain Men is an American reality television series that airs on the History channel. The first season premiered on May 31, 2012; the tenth season premiered on June 3, 2021. As of August 13, 2020, 193 episodes of Mountain Men have aired.

== Series overview ==
Season	Episodes	Originally released	
Season	Episodes	First released	Last released
1	8	May 31, 2012	July 19, 2012
2	16	June 9, 2013	September 29, 2013
3	16 + 1	June 1, 2014	September 14, 2014
4	16 + 1	June 18, 2015	October 1, 2015
5	16 + 1	May 5, 2016	September 15, 2016
6	16 + 1	June 8, 2017	September 21, 2017
7	16	July 19, 2018	November 1, 2018
8	13	June 6, 2019	September 5, 2019
9	12 + 4	June 4, 2020	January 28, 2021
10	10	June 3, 2021	August 12, 2021
11	13	September 1, 2022	December 8, 2022
12	10 + 8	August 24, 2023	November 2, 2023

- The + following the number of episodes indicates the number of specials aired during that season.

== Episodes ==
=== Season 1 (2012) ===
No. overall	No. in season	Title	Original release date	US viewers (millions)
1	1	"Winter Is Coming"	May 31, 2012	3.90
High in the Appalachian Mountains of North Carolina, Eustace Conway has lived in the mountains for more than thirty years. He sells firewood for income and survives off the resources of the land. He also has a small crew of workers helping him on his 1,000-acre property, including Justin McGuire, a tough city boy; Chloe, a college student; and Jessie, who is struggling to adjust to outdoor living. Tom Oar lives in the Yaak River Valley of northwest Montana with his wife Nancy and their German-shorthaired Pointer Ellie. His nearest neighbor Will is a close friend of Tom's from his days as a bronco rider. Tom and Will go hunting for deer but are unable to get one. Marty Meierotto lives in the small Alaskan town of Two Rivers with his wife Dominique and young daughter Noah. Every month, he flies his small bush plane to his small, isolated log cabin 200 miles away from home to run his trap line. The furs brings in a small income to help his family out through the whole year.
2	2	"Mayhem"	June 7, 2012	3.46
Eustace is facing several problems. One of his workers, Justin McGuire, continues to let him down. And Eustace receives a letter that his land will be taken away in a matter of weeks for failing to pay taxes. In Montana, Tom Oar is struggling to find meat. His neighbor Tim asks him for help in removing a couple of beavers from his drinking water. Tom is able to trap two beavers, providing him with some meat for the winter. In the Alaskan wilderness, Marty has arrived at his cabin and is preparing for the trapping season. After collecting water, Marty heads out to check his traps, but finds most of them empty. His snow machine breaks down, forcing him to continue the rest of the journey back on foot.
3	3	"Lost"	June 14, 2012	3.51
In Montana, Tom Oar is struggling to provide meat and furs for the winter. Tom's neighbor Tim takes him on a duck hunt down the Kootenay River. In North Carolina, Eustace is struggling to cope with his own problems. He has the lien to deal with on his 1,000-acre property. And after weeks of underperforming and clashing with everyone at Turtle Island, Eustace had no choice but to fire Justin. In Alaska, Marty replaces the malfunctioning engine in his snow machine, but snaps his steering column, and has to return to the cabin to repair it.
4	4	"Miles From Home"	June 21, 2012	3.27
Marty barely beats a storm flying home to his wife and young daughter Noah to see her ballet recital. Tom Oar's daughter Keelie wants Tom and his wife Nancy to come to Florida and retire. Tom's brother Jack in Idaho invites him to come visit his horse ranch. They drive off a mountain lion and go hunting. Eustace comes down with a cold. He treats himself with tea made from yellow root and sweats himself in his makeshift sweat lodge. Eustace gets better and helps Preston deliver firewood to get cash to pay off the lien on his property.
5	5	"Surviving Winter"	June 28, 2012	3.18
Tom Oar must put his work on hold while he tries to find winter meat and protect himself from looming predators. Eustace Conway brings in a former Turtle Island worker to pick up the slack and protect Turtle Island's most valuable resource. And Marty Meierotto battles time and Mother Nature as he races to make his fur deadline.
6	6	"Show Me the Money"	July 5, 2012	3.25
Tom Oar is forced to take matters into his own hands and push dangerous wolves away from his property. In North Carolina, the water runs out for Eustace, shutting down Turtle Island. And in Alaska, a simple mistake could cost Marty everything.
7	7	"The Final Stand"	July 12, 2012	4.15
High in the Appalachians, Eustace Conway is forced to track down a poacher that has trespassed upon his land. In Alaska, Marty Meierotto is in on the hunt to provide for his family when unwanted grizzlies make themselves known. And in the Yaak Valley of Montana, bears wake as Tom and friend Tim hunt antlers deep into the forest. But when things get dangerously quiet, they soon realize they are not alone.
8	8	"This Is the End"	July 19, 2012	3.59
In North Carolina, Eustace Conway's land is in jeopardy, so he saddles up and rides into town to make his final stand. In Alaska, Marty battles weather and wind as he attempts to feed his family and make it back home alive. And finally, Tom Oar's under the gun to finish his goods when an unwelcome bear threatens his family.

=== Season 2 (2013) ===
No. overall	No. in season	Title	Original release date	US viewers (millions)
9	1	"Into the Wild"	June 9, 2013	3.02
In the Yaak Valley of northwest Montana, the worst fire season in living memory threatens the home of Tom Oar. In Alaska, Marty Meierotto flies into the heart of a vicious storm on his annual journey to his remote winter trapline.
10	2	"The Night's Watch"	June 16, 2013	2.85
Marty Meierotto arrives at his Alaska trapline, but the unseasonably warm weather is impeding his plans. In North Carolina, Eustace Conway discovers two headless chickens in his henhouse, and begins a hunt for the predator responsible.
11	3	"Winter Strikes"	June 23, 2013	3.02
Desperate for food after a grizzly bear ravaged his garden, Tom Oar embarks on a last-ditch deer hunt. Marty Meierotto begins to establish his winter trapline, breaking fresh trail in the uncharted wild.
12	4	"Last Chance"	June 30, 2013	3.26
After a successful deer hunt, Tom rushes to prepare the meat before it attracts hungry grizzly bears. In North Carolina, Eustace takes on a grueling job that he needs to complete in order to make his first loan payment.
13	5	"Three Toes Returns"	July 7, 2013	3.33
Rich and his hounds track Rich's nemesis, the killer mountain lion Three-Toes, across the length of Montana's Ruby Valley. In Alaska, a young prot g brings Marty the new snowmobile engine he's been waiting for.
14	6	"Bloody Sunday"	July 14, 2013	3.42
Logger turned Mountain Man, Charlie Tucker's luck takes a turn for the worse in the sub-zero North Maine Woods as a rookie mistake nearly costs him everything. In Alaska, Marty and Andy split up to cover more ground with the plan to rendezvous at dusk.
15	7	"No Way Out"	July 21, 2013	2.88
Marty rushes to make the most of an extra pair of hands. Tom's grandson comes for a visit but soon learns that there's no such thing as vacation in the Yaak. Charlie heads out on a hunt for shed moose antlers.
16	8	"Disaster Strikes"	July 28, 2013	3.74
Rich's cougar hunt takes a dark turn in Montana. Marty competes with a wolf pack for food. Tom and Will race an oncoming storm that puts them in jeopardy. And in Maine, Charlie suspects sabotage.
17	9	"End of the Line"	August 4, 2013	2.81
Charlie spends the night injured and alone in Maine. In Montana Tom investigates signs of a predator lurking too close to home. Eustace rushes to raise money to make his loan payment. And in Idaho, new mountain man George Michaud tries to make a living running his dog sled through the peaks of the mighty Tetons.
18	10	"Thin Ice"	August 11, 2013	3.67
Tom struggles to keep a deadly wolf pack off his land despite an injury. Rich tracks a large buck over tough terrain on his mid-winter hunting trip. Eustace makes some much-needed repairs.
19	11	"Going For Broke"	August 18, 2013	3.63
In Alaska, Marty tries to capitalize on his recent string of good luck by building a second cabin at the far end of his trap line. Andy flies in to help but with temperatures dropping below zero, the backbreaking labor takes a toll.
20	12	"Ticking Clock"	August 25, 2013	3.40
Tom heads down to Idaho to help his brother break a pair of wild colts. Charlie Tucker returns to action after his shoulder injury, and puts his recovery at risk on Maine's frozen Rowe Lake.
21	13	"Settling the Score"	September 8, 2013	2.71
In the Yaak Valley, Tom Oar teams up with his brother Jack to help return Jack's prized hunting falcon back to the wild. In southern Montana, Rich Lewis and his wife Diane need to move their cattle herd, but will the predators get to them first?
22	14	"Judgment Day"	September 15, 2013	3.04
In Alaska, after spending the night under the stars in subzero conditions Marty struggles to get his snow machine out of a stubborn overflow. In the Ruby Valley, Rich takes his oldest dog, Brandy and youngest dog, Hatchet, out on a training mission.
23	15	"Meltdown"	September 22, 2013	3.50
The end of Montana's long winter is finally in sight. Tom and Nancy Oar are scrambling to get through the last of their winter works when a surprise call comes in from their family that will force them to make a difficult decision.
24	16	"Misty Mountain"	September 29, 2013	3.24
Winter has finally come to a close, spelling big changes for Tom, who bids farewell to an old friend and packs his bags for Florida. In the Ruby Valley, Rich grooms his youngest hound to take over the pack, but an influx of cougars finds the pup.

=== Season 3 (2014) ===
No. overall	No. in season	Title	Original release date	US viewers (millions)
25	1	"Winter's Wrath"	June 1, 2014	3.21
This season opens as a polar vortex sweeps across the nation and plunges America into a brutal early winter. Tom Oar is behind on his winter preparations because he's spending time with family in Florida and facing a possibly life-changing decision. Will he sacrifice leaving the mountain man lifestyle behind to live closer to his family? In the Ruby Valley, a bloody encounter with a mountain lion leaves Rich Lewis's lead hunting dog Brandy in a life or death situation, and could end her career forever. Marty Meierotto takes advantage of a break in the harsh weather to embark on his annual trip to the Great Alaskan Range, but this year instead of leaving his wife, Dominique and their daughter Noah behind he's taking them with him. And in New Mexico's rugged and relentless High Desert, we meet Kyle Bell who is teaching his son Ben the dying ways of the mountain man lifestyle.: When it originally aired, Winter's Wrath was an 80 minute episode. It was only during re-runs that the episode was cut down into two separate episodes and the content of the second episode was then titled The Darkness. The original season, as broadcast, had 15 episodes. The re-run season has 16 episodes.
26	2	"The Darkness"	June 1, 2014	3.21
As winter tightens its grip on the nation, the mountain men fight the elements to stay alive. In New Mexico's Cimarron Valley, Kyle Bell and his son Ben scramble to save a herd of bison from a fast approaching winter storm. In North Carolina's Blue Ridge Mountains, Eustace Conway and his friend Preston brave the wettest winter in decades to stop a dangerous landslide from washing out a rural road. In Montana, Tom Oar prepares himself for the fight of a lifetime after a run in with a pack of wolves while Rich Lewis braves a blizzard to put meat on his table for the winter. And deep in Alaska's wilderness Marty Meierotto and his family settle into their new remote surroundings.: When it originally aired, Winter's Wrath was an 80 minute episode. It was only during re-runs that the episode was cut down into two separate episodes and the content of the second episode was then titled The Darkness. The original season, as broadcast, had 15 episodes. The re-run season has 16 episodes.
27	3	"Valley of the Wolves"	June 8, 2014	3.02
As the worst winter in decades rages across the nation, the Mountain Men must fight to stay on top of the food chain. In the Yaak Valley, the growing wolf population comes knocking on Tom Oar's door, and quickly turns into a blood feud. In Alaska, Marty Meierotto's traps are coming up empty, causing him and his family to regroup and figure out how they're going to survive the season. In the Ruby Valley of southwest Montana, Rich Lewis bags enough meat to survive the winter, but his battle has only begun as hungry predators catch the scent. In North Carolina, Eustace Conway struggles to bring a 100-year-old sawmill back to life to keep his property in the black. And in New Mexico's Cimarron Valley, Kyle Bell puts his 10-year-old son's mountain man skills to the test on his first hunting trip.
28	4	"The Revelations"	June 15, 2014	2.57
Marty flies out to start a new trap-line in The Revelation Mountains. Kyle gives Ben his first horse. Eustace starts making a lumber-shed. Tom gets a buffalo hide.
29	5	"Where There's Smoke, There's Fire"	June 22, 2014	3.44
An overflowing river of ice threatens to trap Marty Meierotto with no way out of Alaska's Revelation Mountains. In Montana, Tom Oar's experiment on a lucrative bison hide goes up in flames. And in North Carolina, Eustace Conway puts his ingenuity to the test to build a wood-burning truck from scratch.
30	6	"Training Day"	June 29, 2014	3.39
Rich runs his hunting dogs through a gauntlet of tests to determine which will become the new leader of the pack. Marty sets out on foot to cut a new trap line and salvage his season. While Tom goes back to his roots to bow hunt a buck with hand-crafted arrows.
31	7	"Rite of Passage"	July 6, 2014	2.96
In Montana, Rich Lewis must defend his home from a mountain lion that has invaded his turf. In New Mexico, after a failed first attempt, Kyle Bell's son Ben steps up again to break a wild young colt. In the Revelation Mountains, a voracious wolverine threatens to derail Marty Meierotto's season for good, and in North Carolina, Eustace Conway puts his wood burning truck to the ultimate test.
32	8	"Call of the Wild"	July 13, 2014	2.87
Marty fights back against a wolverine but it takes him on a treacherous journey; Charlie takes a big risk in uncharted wilderness and Tom claims his place on the food chain.
33	9	"Hell on Ice"	July 20, 2014	3.32
When winter unleashes its full fury Kyle and Ben get caught in its crosshairs. In Alaska, Marty's gamble on new country pays off. The polar assault brings Eustace's progress in North Carolina to a standstill. And far north in Maine, Charlie breaks the ice to finally cash in on some fur.
34	10	"Death Trap"	July 27, 2014	3.11
In the Revelation Mountains of Alaska, Marty is forced to make a dangerous river crossing to return to base camp. In Maine, Charlie battles a coyote to protect his new trapping ground. Tom hunts down a nuisance animal in Montana's Yaak Valley and Eustace races against a storm in North Carolina to bring his horses to shelter.
35	11	"The Deep Freeze"	August 3, 2014	3.18
In the Revelation Mountains of Alaska, Marty faces off with a vicious wolverine. In Montana, Rich tries to protect a young family from a hungry predator while Tom Oar battles the bitter cold to build a primitive teepee. And in Maine, one wrong step has Charlie Tucker fighting for his life.
36	12	"Predator"	August 10, 2014	3.04
As the bitter cold pushes predators to the edge, Tom is caught in a close range battle while Rich goes head to head with a pack of wolves.
37	13	"Live, Fight, and Die"	August 17, 2014	3.00
A visit from Tom's son Chad goes terribly wrong and Marty's flight back from the Revelation Mountains is delayed.
38	14	"Stranded"	August 24, 2014	3.12
Marty is stranded in the Revelation Mountains with one last chance to get home, while Kyle and Ben launch a nighttime stakeout to stop a predator.
39	15	"The Great Escape"	September 7, 2014	2.968
Tom battles a dangerous ice jam. Marty launches a last ditch escape from the Revelations, and a deadly predator returns to the Ruby Valley.
40	16	"No Rest for the Weary"	September 14, 2014	3.023
Marty is forced to make a mid-flight detour that costs him precious fuel; Rich faces his worst fear when the dogs run off in pursuit of a deadly predator, and Kyle takes down a beast.
41	Special	"Closest Calls"	September 14, 2014	N/A
Everyday is a fight for their freedom and independence, but some battles are harder fought and push the men closer to the edge than ever before. These are Mountain Men's closest calls. While chasing mountain lions, Rich Lewis comes face to face with a cougar 50-feet off the ground. His dogs take him deep into a dangerous cave and force him into a fight for survival against the elements. Marty Meierotto almost takes a nosedive to his death in his bush plane. He's left stranded at night with no survival gear and he faces a desperate struggle to hunt down enough meat to make it through the winter. In the Yaak, Tom Oar fights back deadly wildfires and grizzly bears to save his only asset in life--his home. Eustace Conway risks it all to chase armed poachers off his land. And finally, in Maine, a high-speed snowmobile crash almost takes Charlie Tucker out for the season.

=== Season 4 (2015) ===
No. overall	No. in season	Title	Original release date	US viewers (millions)
42	1	"Adapt or Die"	June 18, 2015	2.371
After surviving last year’s record breaking cold, the Mountain Men return more prepared than ever to do battle against Mother Nature, but unpredictable extremes in an ever-changing world force them to find new ways to adapt or die.
43	Special	"Man vs. Predator"	June 19, 2015	N/A
Relive the mountain men's best battles against nature's deadliest predators.
44	2	"Dark Crossing"	June 25, 2015	2.107
Tom defends his home against a bear threat while Morgan makes a deadly miscalculation on thin ice.
45	3	"Welcome to the Tundra"	July 2, 2015	2.599
Morgan gets caught in the grips of an ice desert with no shelter in sight and Marty’s return to Alaska’s Revelation Mountains takes an unexpected turn.
46	4	"Best Laid Plans"	July 9, 2015	3.088
Winter's uneven arrival causes mayhem in the mountains, putting Rich on the front lines of a new war against predators and pushing Tom to the brink.
47	5	"Deadly Ascent"	July 16, 2015	3.040
Morgan climbs into the treacherous Alaska Range; Rich goes to war with the wolves.
48	6	"Snowblind"	July 23, 2015	2.710
Morgan walks into a death trap in the Alaska Range when a whiteout strikes in an avalanche zone.
49	7	"The Fallen"	July 30, 2015	2.847
Marty discovers an unexpected advantage and Rich mounts a search for a lost friend.
50	8	"Lifeblood"	August 6, 2015	2.441
Morgan stakes out his next meal to fight off starvation; Marty discovers an unexpected jackpot.
51	9	"So Close, Yet So Far Away"	August 13, 2015	2.652
Tom's run of bad luck intensifies, but he refuses to give up; Morgan closes in on his goal and Marty prepares for his family's arrival on the line.
52	10	"Hard Target"	August 20, 2015	3.013
Morgan's survival hangs on a critical airdrop; gale-force winds threaten to destroy Marty's cabin; Tom finally gets a breakthrough that could end his losing streak.
53	11	"Touchdown"	August 27, 2015	2.740
In Alaska, Marty Meierotto completes his cabin build just in time for his family to touch down in the Revelation Mountains. While in Montana, Rich Lewis has a real-life cliffhanger as his dogs go one step too far in the pursuit of a bobcat and Tom Oar’s skills are put to the test on a risky commission. In North Carolina, Eustace Conway pushes for the finish line, but a mistake brings his lumber operation to a screeching halt.
54	12	"Miles to Go"	September 3, 2015	2.067
A breakdown leaves Marty stranded after dark; Eustace must improvise when he comes up shorthanded.
55	13	"In the Blood"	September 10, 2015	2.321
An early melt brings Marty’s record run to a screeching halt; Tom gets an unexpected boost and Eustace rushes to finish his logging job before spring.
56	14	"Winter's Gamble"	September 17, 2015	2.366
Marty makes a gamble that changes everything; a storm batters Eustace and Preston during their final push.
57	15	"Awakening"	September 24, 2015	2.765
A predator returns just when Tom can least afford it. Marty runs out of daylight, and Rich battles against timber wolves.
58	16	"Hard Fought and Fairly Won"	October 1, 2015	2.440
It's a race against the end of winter as the melt sets in. Marty gambles on thin ice, a predator awakens in the Yaak and Rich launches a rescue mission.

=== Season 5 (2016) ===
No. overall	No. in season	Title	Original release date	US viewers (millions)
59	Special	"Man vs. Winter"	May 5, 2016	N/A
Season after season, the mountain men are locked in an endless battle against winter: the most dangerous predator of them all.
60	1	"The Wasteland"	May 12, 2016	N/A
Rich deals with the aftermath of his accident; Morgan's search for food intensifies; and Eustace gets a golden opportunity, but it may be more trouble than it's worth.
61	2	"Fallout"	May 19, 2016	N/A
Rich deals with the aftermath of his accident; Morgan's search for food intensifies; and Eustace gets a golden opportunity, but it may be more trouble than it's worth.
62	3	"All Work and No Pay"	May 26, 2016	N/A
Marty's retreat leads to a surprise in his own back yard; Morgan builds to beat the dangers of the deep freeze; and Tom hits the jackpot.
63	4	"No Man Is an Island"	June 9, 2016	N/A
Tom calls in reinforcements to bail him out; Morgan fights for survival in the deep freeze and a father gambles everything for his family's future.
64	5	"Nothing Ventured, Nothing Gained"	June 16, 2016	N/A
Tom and Nancy divide and conquer to get ahead; Eustace makes a breakthrough with his lumber business, while Morgan's luck finally turns around.
65	6	"Gone"	June 23, 2016	N/A
A hard truth forces Tom to do the unthinkable; Morgan goes on a do or die hunt in the high peaks; Marty discovers competition on the line.
66	7	"Freeze Out"	June 30, 2016	N/A
A jackpot slips from Tom's grasp; Morgan's last ditch effort to find food takes him into the treacherous peaks; and Marty is driven off his line.
67	8	"Killer Instinct"	July 7, 2016	N/A
Rich hunts a known dog-killer on unfamiliar ground; Morgan goes to great heights to protect his food supply; Tom harnesses the power of a bird of prey.
68	9	"Crash and Burn"	July 28, 2016	N/A
Tom takes on the Snake; Marty's new opportunity goes up in smoke and Eustace takes a hard fall that puts him out of commission.
69	10	"Concussion"	August 4, 2016	N/A
Eustace struggles to accept the reality of his injuries; Marty scrambles to recover from a costly blow and Tom finally makes a breakthrough.
70	11	"The Bull & the Bear"	August 11, 2016	N/A
Marty begins an epic overland journey into the Alaskan bush; Morgan clashes with a ravenous grizzly bear.
71	12	"Rock Bottom"	August 18, 2016	N/A
Tom hits the rocks with only weeks of winter left to go; Morgan seeks protection from the bears and Jason fires up the forge.
72	13	"Nemesis"	August 25, 2016	N/A
The river deals Tom's season a fatal blow; Marty fights the ice to make it home and Jason battles a deadline to deliver for his family.
73	14	"The Sting of Defeat"	September 1, 2016	N/A
Tom washes out in Idaho and retreats to the Yaak; Eustace races to stop a breakout and Morgan battles predators large and small.
74	15	"I'll Go Down Fighting"	September 8, 2016	N/A
Tom scrambles a last minute bear hunt to save his season; Morgan fights for his future with fire; Eustace has an unexpected showdown.
75	16	"Generations"	September 15, 2016	N/A
Tom pays the price for two consecutive failed winters; Morgan calls in reinforcements for his horses; Eustace and Preston harvest a hog and Rich makes a pick of the litter.

=== Season 6 (2017) ===
No. overall	No. in season	Title	Original release date	US viewers (millions)
76	Special	"Escape to the Wild"	June 8, 2017	N/A
Tom Oar, Marty Meierotto, and Eustace Conway reveal what it takes to answer the call of the wild; the untold stories of their first winter, and the early trials that forged them into legends of the mountains.
77	1	"No Goin' Back"	June 8, 2017	N/A
Winter descends on the mountains without mercy; Marty is trapped in 50 below, Morgan and Tom forge new alliances; Rich battles a rogue grizzly.
78	2	"Edge of Winter"	June 15, 2017	N/A
Morgan races the ice to gather critical supplies, Eustace digs out from a devastating tornado, and Marty takes to the air in a high-risk bid to win the season.
78	3	"Breakage"	June 22, 2017	N/A
Morgan battles to stay afloat on a treacherous river run, Jason loses everything, and for Rich's dog team, routine training turns to live combat.
79	4	"Hard Luck"	June 29, 2017	N/A
Morgan faces a gauntlet of frozen river crossings to get home, Tom strikes out, and Marty's season begins to unravel.
80	5	"The Surge"	July 6, 2017	N/A
As winter strikes, Morgan hunts for riches in the ruins; Jason tackles a river giant; and Eustace makes a breakthrough with black powder.
81	6	"Let the Weight of the Hammer Do the Work"	July 13, 2017	N/A
Marty's retreat leads to a surprise in his own back yard; Morgan builds to beat the dangers of the deep freeze; and Tom hits the jackpot.
82	7	"Hunter and Hunted"	July 20, 2017	N/A
Tom defends his home against a wolf pack, Eustace attempts to turn trash into treasure, and Jason goes on a mission to feed his family.
83	8	"The Cut"	July 27, 2017	N/A
A slip of the axe blade slices Morgan too deep; Marty targets a wolf pack on a killing spree; Tom digs out.
84	9	"Birthright"	August 3, 2017	N/A
Morgan is sidelined while he gets back on his feet; Marty fights to stay in the game and Eustace makes a critical trade to protect his future.
85	10	"Only the Strong Survive"	August 10, 2017	N/A
Marty doubles down on a new strategy to keep from losing more ground; Morgan and Margaret defend what's theirs and Jason's hunt for land becomes an ordeal.Marty doubles down on a new strategy to keep from losing more ground; Morgan and Margaret defend what's theirs and Jason's hunt for land becomes an ordeal.
86	11	"Waste Not, Want Not"	August 24, 2017	N/A
Marty fights for every last dollar as his season goes into freefall; Eustace and Preston experiment in barnyard engineering and Jason gets locked out of a new home.
87	12	"Long Shot"	August 31, 2017	N/A
An early thaw puts Morgan's supply drop on thin ice; Marty hunts the beasts of Kodiak Island and Tom makes the most of his unprecedented winning streak.
88	13	"High & Dry"	September 7, 2017	N/A
Morgan slips up navigating the meltdown that's transforming the Alaskan wild; Marty's high altitude hunt takes him to the top of Kodiak Island's most treacherous peaks, and Eustace and Preston bring down a giant.
89	14	"Race to Ruin"	September 14, 2017	N/A
An early melt unleashes the local bears weeks ahead of schedule in the Great Alaska Range; Jason hunt for a home is finally over, and Eustace and Preston's race to the finish ends in ruin.
90	15	"Stand Your Ground"	September 21, 2017	N/A
Morgan's horses go missing just as the local bears are waking for spring; Rich's marathon lion hunt turns into an epic chase and Tom goes after America's largest game.
91	16	"To Every Thing There Is a Season"	September 21, 2017	N/A
Marty ends a failed season with a blockbuster catch; Tom stands his ground against a powerful beast and in Preston's final episode, he and Eustace fight fire with fire to lay down roots for the next generation.

=== Season 7 (2018) ===
No. overall	No. in season	Title	Original release date	US viewers (millions)
92	1	"Nowhere to Run"	July 19, 2018	N/A
As winter approaches, Morgan battles a bear-infested island for a critical head start on the season; Tom is caught in Montana's deadly wildfires; Eustace wrestles with the aftermath of Preston's death, and the Hawk clan prepares for a life-changing arrival.
93	2	"Time and Tide"	July 26, 2018	N/A
The bears keep Morgan on the run as he tries to secure his catch and escape with his life; Eustace struggles to get back to work without Preston; Jason and Mary prepare for their due date; Tom scales treacherous terrain and Jake readies his team to face down the lions.
94	3	"Labor Pains"	August 2, 2018	N/A
In a risky bid to get out of the red, Marty fights to reclaim his long-abandoned turf; Morgan races to build a shelter in the snow and ice of subzero Alaska; Eustace gets a boost in horsepower; Jason and Mary brace for a home birth; and Jake's lion hunt takes a dangerous detour.
95	4	"Fight or Flight"	August 9, 2018	N/A
Morgan gets a crash course in extreme winter flying; Marty battles a predator invasion; Tom faces a new wolf threat; Jake and his hounds hunt a rogue lion; and Jason steps in to bring a new life into the world.
96	5	"Battle Lines"	August 16, 2018	N/A
Tom takes the fight to the wolves; a lion chase claims a casualty; Morgan builds bigger; and Eustace goes to battle to defend his land.
97	6	"While the Going Is Good"	August 23, 2018	N/A
Marty brings in a record haul; Margaret's extreme flight training leaves her out in the cold; Tom puts his master craftsmen skills to work; and Jake chases his next meal.
98	7	"Block and Tackle"	August 30, 2018	N/A
Tom returns to the field on a rescue mission; The deep freeze leaves Morgan and Margaret scrambling for water; Eustace takes on a risky payday in a bid to buy his neighbor's land; and Jason's improvised engineering is a game-changer in the forge.
99	8	"Edge of the Earth"	September 6, 2018	N/A
Eustace battles a beast to bring home a bonus payday; in pursuit of a lion Jake's team is left hanging on a cliff's edge; Marty gambles on the ice to make bank, and Mike fights to survive the dangers of bears-infested Kodiak.
100	9	"Altitude"	September 13, 2018	N/A
Morgan has another flight lesson, this time over the peaks; Marty's quest finally catches him the pesky Wolverine; Eustace finishes the timber lumbering job netting more than he at first thought; and Jason takes daughter River hunting for the first time.
101	10	"Lost Time Is Never Found"	September 20, 2018	N/A
A mid-winter melt threatens to derail Tom's season; Eustace masters gravity to keep the water flowing at home; Jason and Mary make a move to feed their growing family; Morgan and Margaret top off a major project; Mike cashes in on a rare find.
102	11	"Conquer the Mountain"	September 27, 2018	N/A
Marty brings out the big guns for a final frenzied push out of the brush; Morgan and Margaret make a major breakthrough; Mike battles Kodiak's most treacherous mountain; Jake faces down a pair of predators; Jason fuels the forge.
103	12	"Milestones"	October 4, 2018	N/A
A massive week-long storm tears Morgan's homestead apart; Mike goes on the offensive for the annual awakening of Kodiak's bears; Tom takes on a custom order to celebrate an important milestone; Jason builds a Viking axe.
104	13	"The Rising Storm"	October 11, 2018	N/A
When a massive mid-winter storm tears across Alaska, Marty pushes his machine to the limit; Morgan and Margaret race to make the cut before the snow hits; Eustace revives a lucrative business venture; Jason discovers a hidden bladesmith's bounty.
105	14	"Double Jeopardy"	October 18, 2018	N/A
Morgan's big day goes bust when his plane breaks down; Mike's supply run across the bay leaves him high and dry; Tom takes on a rare high value commission; and Jake's dog team hunts down two lions in a marathon high-speed chase.
106	15	"The Gauntlet"	October 25, 2018	N/A
Morgan's first flight to the homestead hits a wall of bad weather; Mike fights icy currents and fading daylight to get supplies back to his cabin; Tom runs a gauntlet of timber and brush in search of some late season fur; Eustace revives his furniture business to make some fast cash; and Jason forges salvaged airplane parts into high-end cutlery.
107	16	"Hell or High Water"	November 1, 2018	N/A
Hell or High Water: Marty wraps up trapping season with a record haul. Tom battles rapids on the Kootenai River, and Eustace tries to raise a down payment to buy land.

=== Season 8 (2019) ===
No. overall	No. in season	Title	Original release date	US viewers (millions)
108	1	"New Blood"	June 6, 2019	N/A
As winter closes in, Morgan and Margaret fly North to track down the great caribou migration and secure meat; Marty preps his trapline for the arrival of his daughter, Noah; Jake starts his season tracking two lions. Eustace takes on an apprentice and uncovers some illicit activity on his new land; Kidd and Harry rescue horses from a pack of hungry wolves.
109	2	"Polar Vortex"	June 13, 2019	N/A
Eustace and Raleigh battle a polar vortex to get their lumber business back online; Mike braves a bear-infested landscape in search of fresh meat; Morgan and Margaret chase the migrating caribou, hoping to secure enough food for winter; Jason goes underground searching for iron ore; and Tom and Sean bet big on new trapping grounds.
110	3	"Darkness Falls"	June 20, 2019	N/A
As night descends across the mountains, Mike treks through bear country with fresh meat on his back; Morgan battles dark and dangerous terrain in a last-ditch effort to fill his freezer; Jake's latest lion hunt takes him deep into wolf territory; Tom joins his brother on an all-night rifle build; and Jason journeys further underground in search of raw iron ore.
111	4	"Family First"	June 27, 2019	N/A
Jake will do anything to get his injured dog, Lefty, to the vet. Tom and his brother, Jack, are left high and dry when the well on his ranch stops pumping. Morgan takes one last shot at bagging a mountain sheep; Mike has to go back on the hunt after bears pillage his provisions. And Marty makes a shocking revelation.
112	5	"Final Farewell"	July 11, 2019	N/A
Jake sets off alone on the hunt for elk meat; Jason rolls the dice on an experimental smelter; Morgan and Margaret combat a critical water problem; Mike targets Kodiak Island's most dangerous quarry; and Marty bids a final farewell.
113	6	"The Long Haul"	July 18, 2019	N/A
Eustace and Raleigh set out in search of a deer to replenish their food stores; Jason faces the moment of truth in his attempt to create his own steel; Jake hauls 400 pounds of fresh elk meat out of the mountains; Kidd and Harry pack supplies into Idaho's remote back-country; and Morgan and Margaret hope that a new trap-line will save the day.
114	7	"Desperate Measures"	July 25, 2019	N/A
Kidd and Harry battle time and rough terrain on a back-country supply run; Jake and his dogs track down a repeat offender; Tom gets back to business in the Yaak; Morgan checks his remote trap-line for high-dollar fur; plus Eustace and Raleigh decide to fight back against trespassers.
115	8	"Breaking Point"	August 1, 2019	N/A
Jake has a problem lion on his hands and soon discovers it's not alone; Tom and his brother, Jack, break down on the road to the Yaak Valley; Morgan crosses the Great Alaska Range on an emergency supply run; Jason scavenges steel to jumpstart his bladesmith business; and Eustace and Raleigh's outpost cabin build is dealt a hard blow.
116	9	"No Guts, No Glory"	August 8, 2019	N/A
Kidd and Harry set their sights on bagging a buffalo; Jason and his son forge a brand new knife together for the first time; Jake goes after a mountain lion caught too close to civilization; and Morgan fights the deadly skies of Alaska in a race to resupply his homestead.
117	10	"All or Nothing"	August 15, 2019	N/A
Tom and Sean face off against a coyote threat; Eustace and Raleigh enlist some much-needed help building their lookout cabin; Jason takes one final crack at creating Ozark steel; Morgan and Margaret push deep into the back-country in search of a stream where the fish are jumping; and Kidd and Harry run rapids to secure grazing land for the summer.
118	11	"Tooth and Claw"	August 22, 2019	N/A
Tom turns coyotes into cash; Eustace and Raleigh take to the forge to raise money for roofing materials; Mike scouts bears for the spring hunting season; Morgan and Margaret go fishing; and Kidd and Harry's search for pastureland quickly turns into a pulse-pounding bear chase.
119	12	"The Bus Stop Bandit"	August 29, 2019	N/A
Jake hunts a lion caught stalking a school bus stop; Tom sets out to end his trapping season on a high note; Eustace and Raleigh struggle to put a roof on their outpost cabin; Morgan and Margaret prepare their horses for a critical supply run; and Jason takes on his first ever Ozark steel knife build.
120	13	"Seize the Day"	September 5, 2019	N/A
Tom builds an authentic Native American bull boat; Jake goes back on the hunt for the bus stop bandit; Morgan struggles to haul a ton of greenhouse supplies; Eustace and Raleigh tackle a rush order for lumber; also Jason and his son, Kai, journey back underground in search of more iron ore.

=== Season 9 (2020–21) ===
No. overall	No. in season	Title	Original release date	US viewers (millions)
121	1	"Hunt or be Hunted"	June 4, 2020	N/A
As winter descends in the mountains, Jake’s first lion hunt ends in a near-deadly dust up; Tom and Nancy face a surge in the local coyote population; Jason comes face to face with a marauding black bear; Mike fights predators on land and sea to secure some fish for the winter; and Josh Kirk hunts down a deer for the larder.
122	2	"Bloody Harvest"	June 4, 2020	N/A
Eustace and Raleigh try to restore an antique buzz saw; Tom takes on a massive new dugout canoe project; Jake’s quest for winter meat takes him on a dangerous high-altitude hunt; Kidd and Harry race against a winter storm to round up rogue cattle; and Mike competes with a giant Kodiak bear to score his salmon supply for winter.
123	3	"Fire and Ice"	June 11, 2020	N/A
Tom and Sean brave the bitter cold in search of better trapping grounds; Jake seeks revenge on the lion that injured his hound; Eustace and Raleigh struggle to fix a storm-damaged bridge that connects Turtle Island to the world outside; Mary forges her first Ozark blade; and Josh loses a bison to a pack of hungry wolves.
124	4	"Beasts of Burden"	June 18, 2020	N/A
Jason’s bladesmithing business suffers a critical setback when his hand is badly cut on the job; Jake’s latest lion hunt turns into a rescue mission when he discovers his dogs are on a collision course with a pack of wolves; Kidd and Harry break a colt for a backcountry client; and Josh salvages all he can from a bison that was killed by wolves.
125	5	"Call to Arms"	June 25, 2020	N/A
Mike’s bear scout turns into an alpine goat hunt; Jake brings in the big dogs to settle an old score with a problem lion; Tom and Sean check beaver sets to see if their new trapping grounds will pay off; Jason leans on the family to overcome a looming deadline and a broken hand; and Kidd and Harry run a back-country gauntlet to deliver a young horse to a remote buyer.
126	6	"Turf War"	July 2, 2020	N/A
Back in the Ruby Valley, Jake tracks a dangerous mother lion and her young; Tom hand carves a traditional dugout canoe worth thousands; Kidd and Harry go on the offensive against a pack of coyotes that are targeting their cattle; and Eustace and Raleigh track a rogue black bear that's been raiding a neighbor's home.
127	7	"Carnage"	July 9, 2020	N/A
Mike returns to the bear-infested crags of Kodiak to reclaim his mountain goat kill; Jason hunts down a wild hog to feed his family of five; Kidd & Harry blow up a beaver dam to save their water supply; and Josh goes on the offensive against the rising wolf threat.
128	8	"Sink or Swim"	July 16, 2020	N/A
Jake's second mountain lion chase in the Ruby Valley leaves him cliffed out; Eustace and Raleigh turn scrap steel into pure profit; Kidd sets off on a whitewater excursion unlike any other; and Jason picks up the pieces after a storm drops a tree on his shop.
129	9	"Bloody Knuckles"	July 23, 2020	N/A
Jake's latest mountain lion chase leads him straight to an angry bear; Tom and Jack take on a high-dollar commission to build an ancient atlatl; Jason builds a steel trap to keep the area's wild hogs in check; and Kidd transforms a large wooden boat into a remote summer cabin.
130	10	"Tom's Big Day"	July 30, 2020	N/A
Kidd and Harry are sent into a dangerous free fall by a freak ATV accident; Jake goes on ranch patrol to protect newborn calves; Nancy gives Tom the surprise of a lifetime; Josh attempts to wrangle a feral horse; and Jason salvages farming equipment to keep his bladesmithing operation afloat.
131	11	"Strike it Rich"	August 6, 2020	N/A
Josh goes panning for gold in a quest to unearth the West's greatest treasure; Eustace fights to save his land, but must say goodbye to an old friend; Jason returns to the forge, putting his injured hand to the test; Jake battles steep terrain, and his dogs clash for alpha status within the pack; Kidd and Harry risk getting crushed on a hazardous lumber salvage mission.
132	12	"The Big Reckoning"	August 13, 2020	N/A
Season Finale; On the hunt for gold, Josh hits the jackpot; Tom puts his handmade dugout canoe to the test; Jake makes his last stand against a massive predator; Eustace sees his dream of keeping his new land go up in flames; Kidd and Harry fulfill a lifelong ambition to secure their future in the mountains.
133	13	"Meltdown: Tornado Alley"	January 7, 2021	1.12
As the spring melt sweeps the mountains, Jake sets his sights on bagging a black bear for the larder; Eustace and Raleigh race against time and weather to plant crops; Mike sets out to harvest a bounty from the Gulf of Alaska.
134	14	"Meltdown: Loaded for Bear"	January 14, 2021	N/A
Mike flies into the Kodiak backcountry in search of rich bear hunting grounds; Jason and his family take cover with a tornado warning, then they rush to complete a barn before his new herd of goats arrive; Kidd and Harry hunt down the bear that attacked their cattle.
135	15	"Meltdown: Trial by Fire"	January 21, 2021	N/A
Kidd and Harry go toe to toe with a one-ton bull; Eustace and Raleigh dig deep for Turtle Island's food stores; Mike braves the Kodiak interior on a bear scouting mission; Jason schools his two oldest kids on fishing and survival in the Ozarks.
136	16	"Meltdown: No Man's Land"	January 28, 2021	N/A
In the Meltdown finale, Mike flees on foot to get away from the bear-ridden Kodiak region; Jake chases a lion all the way to foreign ground; Josh confronts a colony of prairie dogs; Jason takes extreme measures to teach his children outdoor survival skills.

=== Season 10 (2021) ===
No. overall	No. in season	Title	Original release date	U.S. viewers (millions)
137	1	"Hunt to Survive"	June 3, 2021	1.40
138	2	"Coyote Showdown"	June 10, 2021	1.44
139	3	"River Disaster"	June 17, 2021	1.32
140	4	"Zombie Moose"	June 24, 2021	1.38
141	5	"Feast or Famine"	July 1, 2021	1.40
142	6	"Brawl of the Wild"	July 8, 2021	1.41
143	7	"On Thin Ice"	July 15, 2021	1.58
144	8	"Big Mountain Payday"	July 22, 2021	1.33
145	9	"Winter's Fury"	August 5, 2021	1.26
146	10	"Mountain Strong"	August 12, 2021	1.42
