= D. B. Sweeney =

American actor (born 1961)

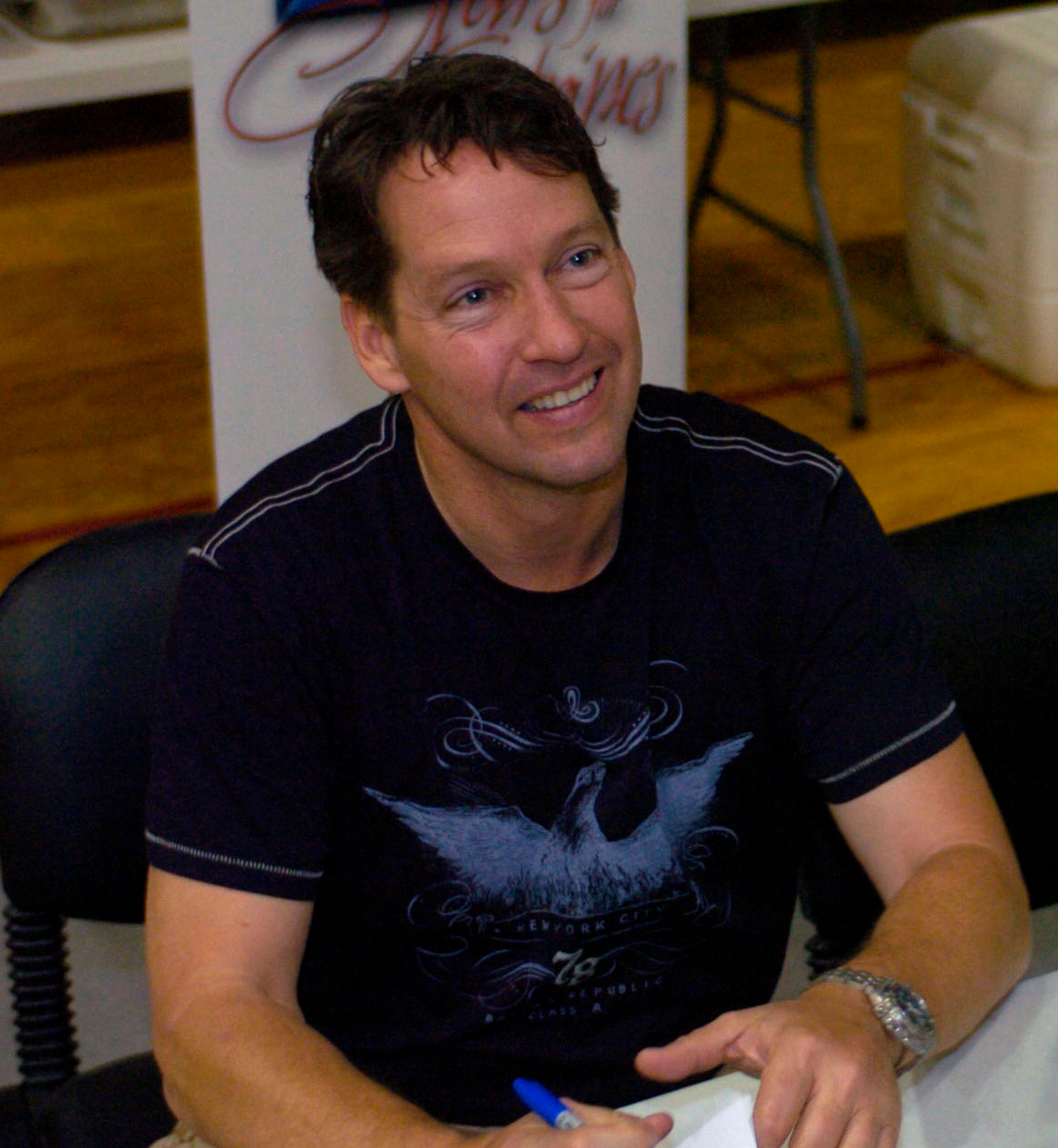
- Sweeney in 2008
- Born: Daniel Bernard Sweeney; November 14, 1961 (age 64); Shoreham, New York, U.S.
- Education: Tulane University; New York University (BFA)
- Occupation: Actor
- Years active: 1985–present
- Spouse: Ashley Vachon (m. 2000; div. 2023)
- Children: 2

Daniel Bernard Sweeney (born November 14, 1961) is an American actor. He is known for his roles as Jackie Willow in Francis Ford Coppola's Gardens of Stone (1987), Lt. Phil Lowenthal in Memphis Belle (1990), and Travis Walton in Fire in the Sky (1993). He also starred in films such as The Cutting Edge (1992), Shoeless Joe Jackson in Eight Men Out (1988), Dinosaur (2000), and Brother Bear (2003).

He has guest-starred on various television series, including House (2006), Jericho (2006–2008), and Castle (2011). He played FBI Special Agent Morris on Major Crimes and The Closer. He also had recurring roles such as Criminal Minds (2009), Crash (2008), and The Event (2010).

== Early life ==
Sweeney was born in Shoreham, New York, on November 14, 1961. He attended both Tulane and New York University.

== Career ==
In 1990, Sweeney starred as Treplev in Jeff Cohen's contemporary adaptation of Anton Chekhov's classic The Seagull at a small Off-Broadway theater (the RAPP Arts Center) in New York's Alphabet City neighborhood. His co-star was a then unknown Laura Linney, making her New York stage debut as Nina. The New York Times called Sweeney's performance "bold and exciting".

Sweeney guest-starred in the television series The Edge of Night and Spenser: For Hire. In films, he has played Jackie Willow, a Vietnam-era soldier, in Francis Ford Coppola's Gardens of Stone (1987), navigator 1st Lt. Phil Lowenthal in Memphis Belle (1990), and Travis Walton in Fire in the Sky (1993). He also played former ice hockey player Doug Dorsey in The Cutting Edge (1992), Shoeless Joe Jackson in Eight Men Out (1988), and Dish Boggett in Lonesome Dove (1989).

He was a regular cast member on C-16 from 1997 to 1998.

After voicing Aladar the Iguanodon in the 2000 Disney animated film Dinosaur, Sweeney played Michael Whitman in Life as We Know It. He later returned to Disney to play Kenai's older brother Sitka in Disney's Brother Bear.

Sweeney has guest-starred on various television series, including House (2006) as Crandall, an ex-bandmate of Dr. Gregory House; Jericho as John Goetz, employee of a private military contractor (2006–2008); Castle as a Los Angeles detective (2011), and more. He played FBI Special Agent Morris on The Closer and Major Crimes. He also had recurring roles as U.S. Marshal Sam Kassmeyer, assigned to protect Haley and Jack Hotchner on Criminal Minds (2009); as Peter Emory in season 1 of Crash (2008); as Carter in The Event (2010); and as Larry on Two and a Half Men (2013–2014).

He is currently the voice-over artist for the OWN: Oprah Winfrey Network, and his large body of voiceover work includes three seasons of Fox Sports Net's Beyond the Glory and National Geographic Television's Ice Pilots. Past ad campaigns include Bud Light, Lincoln cars, Conoco-Phillips, John Deere, Major League Baseball, and Coca-Cola.

Sweeney plays Captain John Trent in the horror web series Universal Dead. In late June 2010, it was announced that Universal Dead will be made into a feature film. As of 2023, the film has not appeared.

In 2012, Sweeney voiced the adult Avatar Aang in the first and second seasons of The Legend of Korra, the sequel series of Avatar: The Last Airbender. He currently narrates the reality television series Mountain Men.

In 2017, Sweeney plays a pastor in The Resurrection of Gavin Stone.

== Personal life ==
In April 2000, Sweeney married Ashley Vachon. They divorced in 2023.

== Filmography ==
=== Film ===
Year	Title	Role	Notes
1986	Power	College Student	
1986	Fire with Fire	Baxter	
1987	Gardens of Stone	Jackie Willow	
1987	No Man's Land	Deputy Sheriff Benjamin 'Benjy' Taylor / Bill Ayles	
1988	Eight Men Out	Shoeless Joe Jackson	
1990	Memphis Belle	Lieutenant Phil Lowenthal	
1991	Blue Desert	Steve Smith	
1991	Heaven Is a Playground	Zack Telander	
1991	En dag i oktober (A Day in October)	Niels Jensen	
1992	The Cutting Edge	Doug Dorsey	
1992	Leather Jackets	Mickey	
1993	Fire in the Sky	Travis Walton	
1993	Hear No Evil	Ben Kendall	
1995	Roommates	Michael Holzcek	
1995	Three Wishes	Jeffery Holman	Uncredited
1997	Spawn	CIA Agent Terry Fitzgerald	
1999	The Book of Stars	Prisoner	
1999	Goosed	Steve Steven	
2000	After Sex	Tony	
2000	Dinosaur	Aladar	Voice
2001	Hardball	Matt Hyland	
2003	Brother Bear	Sitka	Voice
2004	Speak	Jack Sordino	
2006	The Darwin Awards	Detective Maguire	
2006	Two Tickets to Paradise	Billy McGriff	Also director, producer and writer
2006	Yellow	Christian Kile	
2008	Stiletto	Danny	
2008	Heatstroke	Captain Steve O'Bannon	
2008	Miracle at St. Anna	Colonel Driscoll	
2012	Taken 2	Bernie Harris	
2012	Atlas Shrugged: Part II	John Galt	
2012	K-11	Lieutenant Gerard Johnson	
2013	Underdogs	Vince DeAntonio	
2014	The Boxcar Children	Baker	Voice
2014	Free Fall	Frank	
2015	Heist	Bernie	
2015	Chi-Raq	Mayor McCloud	
2015	Extraction	Ken Robertson	
2017	The Resurrection of Gavin Stone	Pastor Allen Richardson	
2019	Captive State	Levitt	
2024	Megalopolis	Commissioner Hart	
2025	The Legend of Van Dorn	Standsted	
2025	Protector	Captain Michaels	
TBA	That's Amore!	TBA	Filming

=== Television ===
Year	Title	Role	Notes
1985	Out of the Darkness	Mike	Television film
1985	Spenser: For Hire	Rick	Episode: "Resurrection"
1989	Lonesome Dove	Dish Boggett	Miniseries
1992	Miss Rose White	Dan McKay	Television film
1994	Tales from the Crypt	Clyde	Episode: "Staired in Horror"
1995–1996	Strange Luck	Chance Harper	17 episodes
1997–1998	C-16	Special Agent Dennis Grassi	13 episodes
1999	NYPD Blue	Joey Dwyer	Episode: "Big Bang Theory"
1999	Introducing Dorothy Dandridge	Jack Denison	Television film
1999–2000	Harsh Realm	Mike Pinocchio	9 episodes
2000	The Outer Limits	Scott Bowman	Episode: "The Grid"
2000–2001	Once and Again	Graham Rympalski	3 episodes
2003	CSI: Miami	Simon Bishop	Episode: "Body Count"
2004	CSI: Crime Scene Investigation	Kyle Good	Episode: "Early Rollout"
2004	Going to the Mat	Coach Rice	Television film
2004	Karen Sisco	Harry Boyle	Episode: "No One's Girl"
2004–2005	Life as We Know It	Michael Whitman	13 episodes
2006	House	Dylan Crandall	Episode: "Who's Your Daddy?"
2006–2008	Jericho	John Goetz	5 episodes
2008	Crash	Peter Emory	4 episodes
2008	Leverage	Father Paul	Episode: "The Miracle Job"
2009	Criminal Minds	US Marshal Sam Kassmeyer	3 episodes
2010	CSI: NY	Assistant District Attorney Craig Hansen	Episode: "Criminal Justice "
2010	24	Mark Bledsoe	2 episodes
2010	Three Rivers	Detective Ted Sandefur	Episode: "Status 1A"
2010	The Event	Carter	6 episodes
2011	Hawaii Five-0	Richard Davis	Episode: "Ne Me'e Laua Na Paio"
2011	Castle	Detective Kyle Seeger	Episode: "To Love and Die in L.A."
2011	Swamp Shark	Charlie	Television film
2011	The Closer	FBI Special Agent Morris	Episode: "Relative Matters"
2011	Vegas	Peter Holm	Episode: "Estinto"
2012–2016	Major Crimes	FBI Special Agent Morris	2 episodes
2012–2013	The Legend of Korra	Aang	Voice, 4 episodes
2012–present	Mountain Men	Narrator	
2013	Touch	Joseph Tanner	4 episodes
2013	Betrayal	Howard Goss	2 episodes
2013–2014	Two and a Half Men	Larry	10 episodes
2014	Phineas and Ferb	Slamm Hammer	Voice, episode: "The Klimpaloon Ultimatum"
2015	The Night Shift	Dick	Episode: "Eyes Look at Your Last"
2017–2018	First Team: Juventus	Himself, Narrator	6 episodes
2018	S.W.A.T.	Uncle Ralph	Episode: "Hoax"
2018	Sharp Objects	Mr. Keene	2 episodes
2020	Empire	Elvis Stone	Episode: "Over Everything"
2021–2022	B Positive	Bert	10 episodes
2023	Reporting for Christmas	Hank Dean	Television film

=== Video games ===
Year	Title	Role	Notes
2000	Disney's Dinosaur	Aladar	
