= Mountain Men (TV series) =

Television series

- Genre: Reality
- Starring: Chance Painter; Soraya Painter; Ivy O'Guinn; Jake Herak; Bret Bohn; Lauro Eklund; Marty Meierotto; Mike Horstman; Paul Antczak; Tom Oar
- Narrated by: D. B. Sweeney
- Theme music composer: Nick Nolan
- Opening theme: "Simple Man" by Lynyrd Skynyrd (seasons 1–6); None (seasons 7–12)
- Country of origin: United States
- Original language: English
- No. of seasons: 14
- No. of episodes: 193 (list of episodes)

Production
- Executive producers: Chris Richardson; Marc Pierce; Russ McCarroll; Jake Laufer
- Running time: 42 minutes
- Production company: Warm Springs Productions

Original release
- Network: History
- Release: May 31, 2012 – present

Mountain Men is an American reality television series on History Channel that premiered on May 31, 2012.

== Synopsis ==
Chance Painter and his wife, Soraya, are experienced professional fur trappers living in the icy wilderness of Alaska. Together, they demonstrate what it means to thrive in the North.

Eustace Conway resided on a parcel of land in the Blue Ridge Mountains of North Carolina that he called Turtle Island. There, he hosted people to whom he taught basic wilderness survival skills. Additionally, he earned an income using ancient techniques to harvest firewood. Threatened by a lien against his land, Conway fought to maintain ownership. His friend Preston Roberts would frequently appear on the show.

Marty Meierotto resides in the small Alaskan town of Two Rivers with his wife Dominique and daughter Noah. Once a month Marty flies his Piper PA-18A-150 Super Cub aircraft with tundra tires to his cabin on the Draanjik River in the Alaska North Slope. While there, he uses a snowmobile to tend to his animal traps that he uses to collect furs.

Tom Oar, a former rodeo cowboy, resides near the Yaak River in northwestern Montana with his wife Nancy and their dog Ellie. Facing a seven-month winter season, the pair work hard, with the help of their neighbors, to prepare. Tom is an accomplished tanner of game animal pelts using natural Native American methods.

Rich Lewis, a mountain lion hunter, resides in Montana's Ruby Valley with his wife Diane. He pursues his passion for tracking mountain lions there with the help of a team of hounds. During season 6 he said he was getting too old to be doing this. He did not return for season 7.

George Michaud, a fur trapper, camps along the Snake River and Teton Range in Idaho.

Charlie Tucker, a fur trapper, resides near Great North Woods in Ashland, Maine. He often partners with Jim Dumond.

Kyle Bell, a game hunter and outfitter by trade, runs his hunts over 45,000 acres of rugged landscape and resides in New Mexico's Cimarron Valley with his ten-year-old son, Ben.

Morgan Beasley resides in the Alaska Range with his partner Margaret Stern. Both are licensed bush pilots.

Jason Hawk lived with his family near The Ozarks in Arkansas. He was a master blacksmith and owner of Jason Hawk's Outlaw Forge Works. Jason died on January 28, 2025 at the age of 50 after battling cancer. His wife, Mary Fricchione, has carried on his blade-making legacy alongside his son, Kamui.

Preston Roberts died from complications due to cancer at age 60 on July 24, 2017. His son Joseph Roberts appears in several episodes in the seasons following Preston's death.

Jake Herak, a mountain lion hunter, resides in Montana's Tobacco Root Mountains.

Mike Horstman, a bear hunting guide, resides on Kodiak Island in Alaska with his dog Adele.

Josh Kirk, a ranch manager and game hunter, resides in Wyoming's Wind River Range with his wife Bonnie and their daughter, Eden.

The Youren Brothers, Kidd and Harry, professionally serve as cattle ranchers and game hunters in Idaho's Sawtooth Wilderness.

== Cast ==
- Eustace Conway (seasons 1-12)
- Marty Meierotto (seasons 1–8, 13-present)
- Tom Oar (season 1–present)
- Charlie Tucker (seasons 2–3)
- George Michaud (season 2)
- Rich Lewis (seasons 2–6)
- Kyle Bell (seasons 3–4)
- Morgan Beasley (seasons 4–8)
- Jason Hawk (seasons 5–9)
- Brent Jameson (season 6)
- Margaret Stern (seasons 6–8)
- Jake Herak (season 7–present)
- Mike Horstman (seasons 7-11, 13-present)
- Harry Youren (seasons 8-12)
- Kidd Youren (seasons 8–12)
- Josh Kirk (seasons 9-11)
- Martha Tansy (seasons 10-11)
- Aron Toland (season 12)
- Jennifer Toland (season 12)
- Paul Antczak (season 12-present)
- Ray Livingston (season 12)
- Bret Bohn (season 13-present)
- Daniel Peters (season 13-14)
- Ivy O'Guinn (season 13-present)
- Lauro Eklund (season 12-present)
- Chance Painter (season 14-present)
- Soraya Painter (season 14-present)

== Episodes ==
Season	Episodes	Originally released	
Season	Episodes	First released	Last released
1	8	May 31, 2012	July 19, 2012
2	16	June 9, 2013	September 29, 2013
3	16 + 1	June 1, 2014	September 14, 2014
4	16 + 1	June 18, 2015	October 1, 2015
5	16 + 1	May 5, 2016	September 15, 2016
6	16 + 1	June 8, 2017	September 21, 2017
7	16	July 19, 2018	November 1, 2018
8	13	June 6, 2019	September 5, 2019
9	12 + 4	June 4, 2020	January 28, 2021
10	10	June 3, 2021	August 12, 2021
11	13	September 1, 2022	December 8, 2022
12	10 + 8	August 24, 2023	November 2, 2023
