= Fire in the Sky =

1993 film by Robert Lieberman

- Theatrical release poster
- Directed by: Robert Lieberman
- Screenplay by: Tracy Tormé
- Based on: The Walton Experience by Travis Walton
- Produced by: Joe Wizan; Todd Black
- Starring: D. B. Sweeney; Robert Patrick; Craig Sheffer; Peter Berg; James Garner
- Cinematography: Bill Pope
- Edited by: Steve Mirkovich
- Music by: Mark Isham
- Production company: Wizan/Black Films
- Distributed by: Paramount Pictures
- Release date: March 12, 1993
- Running time: 109 minutes
- Country: United States
- Language: English
- Budget: $15 million
- Box office: $19.9 million

Fire in the Sky is a 1993 American science fiction horror drama film directed by Robert Lieberman and starring D. B. Sweeney, Robert Patrick, James Garner, Craig Sheffer, Scott MacDonald, Henry Thomas, Peter Berg, and Kathleen Wilhoite. Set in 1975, it follows a group of loggers who witness a UFO in the forests of northern Arizona, resulting in a member of their crew disappearing. After the missing man resurfaces five days later, he claims to have been abducted by extraterrestrials. The screenplay by Tracy Tormé is based on Travis Walton's book The Walton Experience (1978), documenting Walton's alleged experience of alien abduction. Walton and his wife make cameo appearances in the film.

Development of Fire in the Sky began around 1986, with screenwriter Tracy Tormé ultimately adapting Walton's book. Despite its marketing as being based on Walton's alleged experiences, numerous aspects of the film deviated from Walton's account of events and were fictionalized. Principal photography took place in the summer of 1992 in Roseburg, Oregon and the surrounding Umpqua National Forest.

Fire in the Sky was not a financial success, grossing $19.9 million domestically on a $15 million budget and received mixed reviews. It was nominated for four Saturn Awards. As of 2023, it was the last feature theatrical film to be based on an alleged extraterrestrial abduction.

== Plot ==
On November 5, 1975, in Snowflake, Arizona, logger Travis Walton, and his five co-workers—Mike Rogers, Allan Dallis, David Whitlock, Greg Hayes and Bobby Cogdill—head to work in the White Mountains.

Driving back towards town that night, the loggers see unearthly red light in the distance through the treeline. Investigating, they encounter an unidentified flying object. Curious, Walton gets out of the truck to examine more closely, but is struck by a bright beam of light and is thrown several feet backwards. Fearing Walton has been killed, the terrified loggers flee. Rogers decides to go back to retrieve Walton, but he is nowhere to be found.

In reporting the incident in town, the loggers are met with skepticism by investigators Sheriff Blake Davis and Lieutenant Frank Watters. Watters, learning that there was a great deal of tension between Dallis and Walton and that Dallis has a criminal record, suspects foul play. That suspicion spreads in town and the loggers become social outcasts.

After a large search party turns up no sign of Walton, the police offer the loggers the chance to take a lie detector test. They take the test in the hopes of proving their innocence. Watters says that the tests were inconclusive and that they will have to return the next day to retake it. Rogers is outraged and angrily declines, the other loggers follow suit. The test's administrator reveals to Watters and Davis that, with the exception of Dallis (whose test results were inconclusive), the loggers seem to be telling the truth.

Five days later, Rogers receives a call from someone claiming to be Walton. He is found at a Heber gas station, alive but naked, dehydrated and severely traumatized. A ufologist questions Walton but is sent away and Walton is taken to a hospital. Rogers visits Walton while he's in the emergency room. He says that the team left but Rogers returned to try to retrieve Walton. Apparently enraged, Walton turns away from Rogers. He in turn chastises Walton for getting out of the truck in the first place.

During a welcome home party, Walton suffers a mental breakdown and flashback to the abduction by the extraterrestrials.

In his flashback, he awakens inside a slimy cocoon. Breaking out of its membrane, a bewildered Walton finds himself adrift in a zero-gravity alien environment inside a cylindrical enclosure, whose walls contain other similar cocoons. Struggling in the low gravity, he accidentally breaches a nearby cocoon, horrified to discover that it contains decomposing human remains. Exploring further, he drifts towards a neighbouring area, seeing several humanoid figures below him. Drifting uncontrollably towards them, he investigates, surmising that the immobile figures are spacesuits, one of which is still occupied by an extraterrestrial creature. Walton attempts to escape, but is apprehended by two aliens who drag him down corridors full of terrestrial detritus such as shoes and keys before arriving in an examination chamber.

The aliens hold the struggling Walton to a platform in the centre of the chamber, stripping him of his clothes and covering him with an elastic material that completely restrains him. Despite Walton's terrified screams, the aliens clinically subject him to a torturous experiment in which a gelatinous substance is forced into his mouth, a tube is inserted down his throat, his jaw is locked open and a device is stabbed into his neck. Overhead equipment then begins lowering towards him. As a needle-like ocular probe extends towards his exposed eye, Walton suddenly reawakens from his flashback in a doctor's office.

While interviewing Walton, Lieutenant Watters expresses his doubts about the abduction, dismissing it as a hoax. He notes that Walton's new celebrity status resulted from the tabloids' attempts to profit from his tale. He believes that Walton faked the abduction. Given that the investigation is officially closed, Watters is forced to abandon his pursuit and leaves town.

Two and a half years later, Walton visits Rogers, now a hermit, and the two men reconcile. The closing titles inform that in 1993, Walton, Rogers, and Dallis were resubmitted to additional polygraph examinations, which they passed, apparently corroborating their innocence.

== Cast ==
- D. B. Sweeney as Travis Walton
- Robert Patrick as Mike Rogers
- James Garner as Lt. Frank Watters
- Craig Sheffer as Allan Dallis
- Peter Berg as David Whitlock
- Henry Thomas as Greg Hayes
- Bradley Gregg as Bobby Cogdill
- Kathleen Wilhoite as Katie Rogers
- Georgia Emelin as Dana Rogers
- Scott MacDonald as Dan Walton
- Noble Willingham as Sheriff Blake Davis
- Charles Foote as Paramedic

== Production ==
=== Development ===
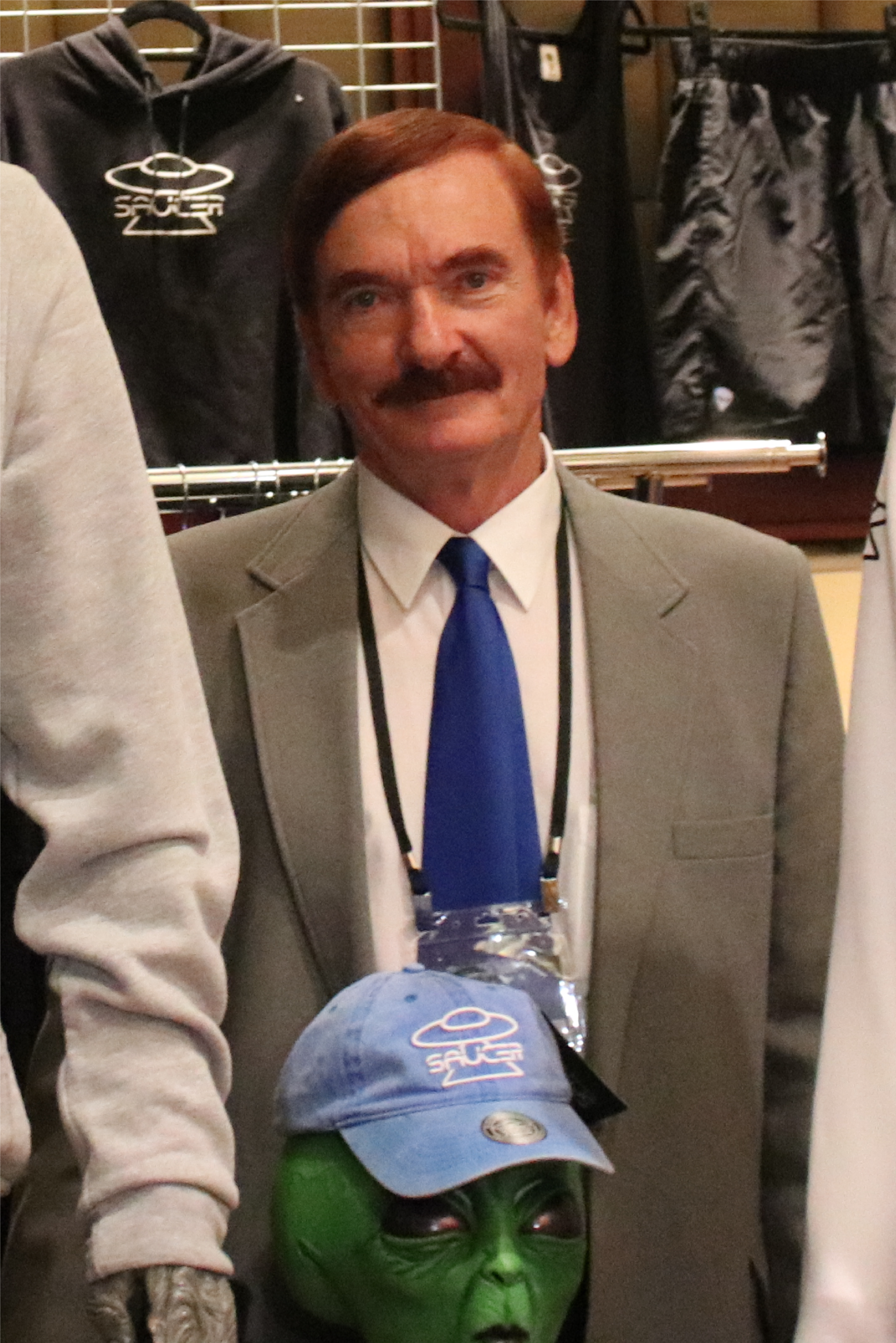
Travis Walton at the 2019 International UFO Congress.

Development of Fire in the Sky began around 1986. With a screenplay by Tracy Torme, the film is based on The Walton Experience (1978) by Travis Walton. In the book, Walton tells how he was abducted by aliens aboard a UFO.

After the film was released, Walton's book was renamed and an edition published as Fire in the Sky (ISBN 1-56924-710-2) to benefit as a tie-in to the film.

In his 2023 book on this topic, Meehan noted that the film's alien abduction scenes bear almost no resemblance to Walton's published claims. Screenwriter Tracy Tormé has said that executives found Walton's account boring, and insisted on the changes.

Director Robert Lieberman suspected Travis Walton's account was a hoax. Decades later, he said: "My gut feeling had it that Travis was so much smarter than those other guys, that it started out as a gag. They probably laced their beer at the end of the day with a little acid or something and then they put on a show for these guys and they believed it."

=== Casting ===
Cast members Scott MacDonald, who played Dan Walton, and Robert Patrick, who played Mike Rogers, spent time with their counterparts. Patrick, who had felt typecast in villainous roles following Terminator 2: Judgment Day, gained weight and grew a beard for the audition.

While working on the film, Patrick learned that he was related to Rogers: "Lo and behold, when I contacted the Mormons in my family, I found out through marriage, I am related to Mike Rogers. And I was like, ‘I am?!’ I called him, we spoke, I asked him specifically about how he was feeling during all this. I wanted to know his emotions. And he said to me during the abduction and the subsequent conversations afterward, that he could not control his emotion. And I tried to utilize that during the film."

Travis Walton and his wife Dana Warden have brief cameos in the film.

=== Filming ===
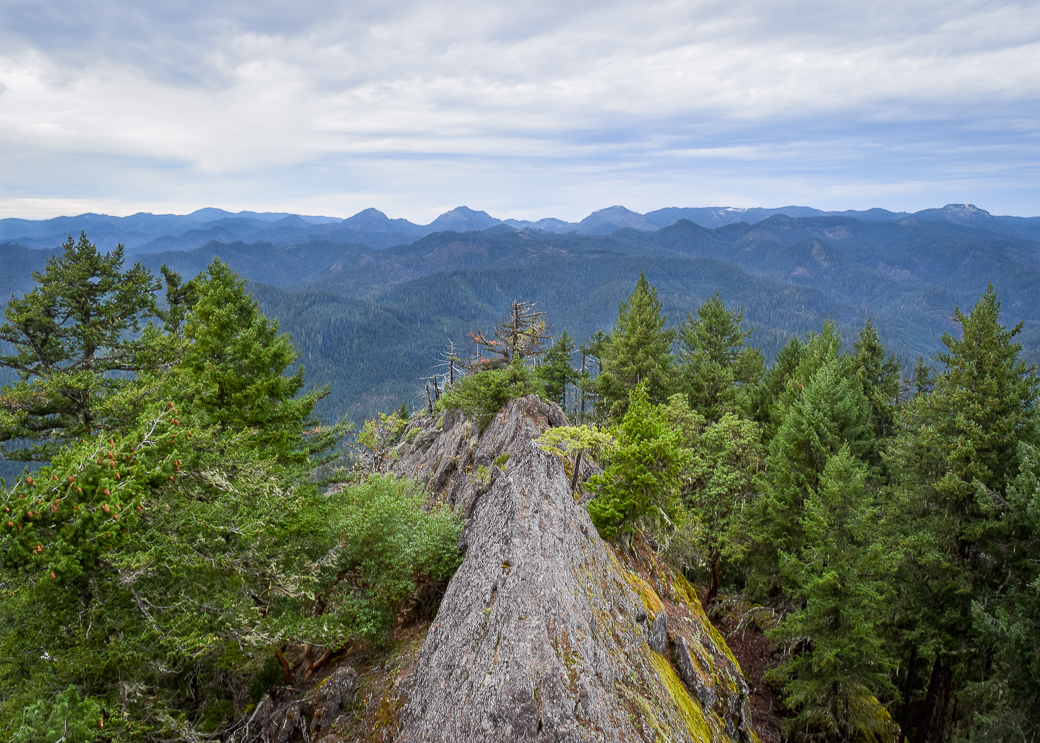
The film was partially shot in Oregon's Umpqua National Forest

Principal photography of Fire in the Sky took place in Roseburg and Oakland, Oregon, as well as the Umpqua National Forest, in the summer of 1992.

The special effects in the film were coordinated by Industrial Light & Magic. The cinematography by Bill Pope was done in Super 35, the same format he would use in The Matrix.

== Music ==
The original music score was composed and arranged by Mark Isham. The audio soundtrack was released in compact disc format on March 30, 1993 by Varèse Sarabande. An expanded limited edition CD set of the soundtrack was released by La-La Land Records on March 11, 2022, followed by a cassette release by Terror Vision Records on August 19.

== Release ==
Paramount Pictures released Fire in the Sky in 1,422 theaters in the United States on March 12, 1993.

=== Home media ===
Paramount Home Entertainment released Fire in the Sky on VHS on September 15, 1993. It proved popular in the home video market, and became one of the top 10 rented films in the United States in October 1993. A DVD edition was released on October 19, 2004. On June 21, 2022 Scream Factory released the film on Blu-ray.

== Reception ==
=== Box office ===
Fire in the Sky earned $6,116,484 during its opening weekend in the United States, ranking number two at the U.S. box office. The following week, it held the number three spot at the box office, expanding to 1,435 theaters and earning an additional $4,012,470. The film's final domestic gross was $19,885,552.

=== Critical response ===
Reviews for Fire in the Sky have been mixed. Reappraisals years after its release have sometimes been more generous to its strengths. On the review aggregator website Rotten Tomatoes, 52% of 31 critics' reviews are positive, with an average rating of 5.4/10. The website's consensus reads: "While a valiant cast brings an authentic urgency to its harrowing alien abduction saga, Fire in the Sky unravels a story that's ultimately too thin and frustratingly coy with its revelations." Metacritic, which uses a weighted average, assigned the film a score of 42 out of 100, based on 17 critics, indicating "mixed or average" reviews.

In 2009 Troy Brownfield of the "Today" show ranked this film among the top ten examples of alien abductions. He wrote "many concur that its experimentation scene is truly frightening."

In 2018 Jeff Spry of Syfy said that after 25 years, it "was still a frightening flick". John Ferguson of the Radio Times wrote, "Lieberman wisely concentrates on the emotional impact of the event on a close-knit circle of friends and family, although the eventual revelation of the abduction is genuinely scary. D. B. Sweeney shines in the lead role and there's good support."

Some reviews at the time praised specific elements of the film. Entertainment Weekly journalist Owen Gleiberman suggested that "It almost doesn't matter if you don't believe any of this stuff. For a few queasy minutes, Fire in the Sky lets you meditate on the aliens in your imagination."

Critic Roger Ebert said, "The scenes inside the craft are really very good. They convincingly depict a reality I haven't seen in the movies before, and for once I did believe that I was seeing something truly alien, and not just a set decorator's daydreams." However, he felt that "there's not enough detail about the aliens, and the movie ends on an inconclusive and frustrating note."

Chris Hicks of the Deseret News said that Fire in the Sky suggests the events actually happened and "some of it is fairly entertaining." However, he disliked the film's sober tone and would have preferred it be "more humorous or satirical, without necessarily sacrificing the sense that these characters believe it all."

Critic James Berardinelli applauded the "stunning, gut-wrenching realism" of the abduction scenes, but called the film a "muddled-up mess" that "can't make up its mind whether it wants to be horror, drama or science-fiction."

Vincent Canby of The New York Times noted that the film "treats the story with cautious, unimaginative, quite boring politeness."

=== Accolades ===
Award/association	Year	Category	Recipient(s) and nominee(s)	Result	Ref.
Saturn Awards	1994	Best Science Fiction Film	Fire in the Sky	Nominated	
Saturn Awards	1994	Best Actor	Robert Patrick	Nominated	
Saturn Awards	1994	Best Writing	Tracy Tormé	Nominated	
Saturn Awards	1994	Best Music	Mark Isham	Nominated	

== Legacy ==
In 2017, Paste named Fire in the Sky as one of the 25 best science fiction films on Netflix. Comedian and actor Patton Oswalt placed Fire in the Sky on his Top 5 Sci-Fi Films in a 2022 interview for GQ.

The X-Files creator Chris Carter and executive producer Frank Spotnitz were impressed by Patrick's performance in the film, which led to his casting Patrick as FBI Special Agent John Doggett for the series' eighth season in 2000.

== See also ==
- Communion, 1989 film based on Whitley Strieber's book describing experiences of alien abduction

== Sources ==
- Meehan, Paul (2023). Alien Abduction in Cinema. Jefferson, North Carolina: McFarland & Company. ISBN 978-1-476-68827-5.
- Muir, John Kenneth (2011). Horror Films of the 1990s. Jefferson, North Carolina: McFarland & Company. ISBN 978-0-786-48480-5.
