= Travis Walton incident =

Alleged alien abduction, 1975

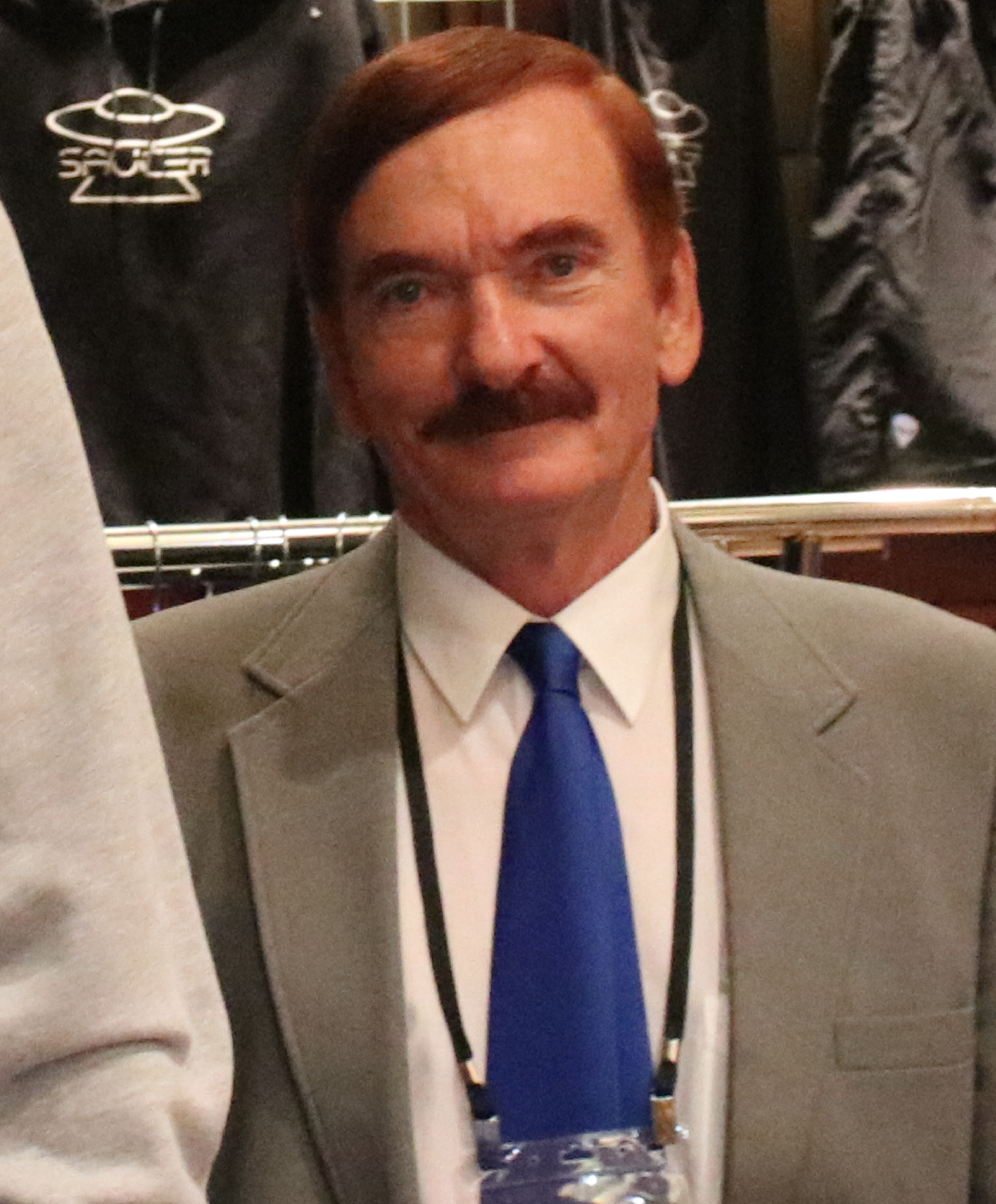
Travis Walton at The 2019 International UFO Congress in Phoenix, Arizona

The Travis Walton incident was an alleged alien abduction of American forestry worker Travis Walton on November 5, 1975, in the Apache–Sitgreaves National Forests near Heber, Arizona. Walton reportedly had said that he was taken aboard a flying saucer.

On November 5, 1975, a logging crew reported that one of their members, Travis Walton, was missing. They asserted that when they were driving back to town after sunset, driver Mike Rogers stopped the truck because they saw an unusual light. His close friend Walton got out and walked into the forest toward the source of the illumination. A beam of light focused on Walton, and he fell to the ground. Fearful, the crew drove away, believing Walton to be dead. After their report, police organized several search parties, aided by a helicopter.

After five days, a bedraggled Walton called his sister from a phone booth in Heber. Walton sold his abduction story to a tabloid, the National Enquirer, which published the account and awarded the crew a $5,000 prize for Best Case of the Year.

In 1978, he published his account as The Walton Experience. While he claimed sole authorship, it was rumored to have been ghostwritten by John G. Fuller.

The book was adapted by Tracy Tormé as the 1993 film Fire in the Sky, directed by Robert Lieberman; the filmmakers admitted taking creative liberties with Walton's purported account.

Science writers Philip J. Klass and Michael Shermer later alleged that Walton had perpetrated a hoax. They suggested a potential motive: an abduction could be considered an "Act of God", thus enabling the logging crew to avoid a steep financial penalty from the Forestry Service for failing to complete their contract by the deadline, as they were behind schedule.

The case has continued to attract interest into the 21st century. In March 2021, Mike Rogers posted on his Facebook page renouncing his status as a witness to Walton's "supposed abduction". He declined to clarify that statement. In May, he posted an omnibus apology wherein he apologized to Travis Walton for any recent negative commentary. Other claims and counterclaims have been posted in social media and were broadcast on such podcasts as Erica Lukes's UFO series.

Skeptic Robert Sheaffer has recommended a new website and materials developed by Charlie Wiser, an Australian researcher. Based in part on work by producer Ryan Gordon, she has made a case that Gentry Tower, a fire lookout post, was used in 1975 to create the illusion of a UFO's searchlight and then as the hiding place for Walton during his purported period of abduction. It was reportedly never searched at the time of the incident.

== Background ==
In the spring of 1972, the National Enquirer tabloid began advertising a $50,000 prize for proof of extraterrestrial visitors. By 1975, the prize had been raised to $100,000.

=== Travis Walton and the Turkey Springs forestry job ===
Turkey Springs, about 12 miles (19 km) south of Heber, was the site of the forestry contract and reported abduction. Travis and the rest of the crew lived 30 miles (48 km) away in Snowflake. Travis was picked up days later at a phone booth in Heber. After his return, Travis traveled with his brother Duane to Phoenix.

Travis Walton was born around 1953 to Mary Walton (later Mary Walton Kellott). On May 5, 1971, Travis Walton and associate Carl Rogers pleaded guilty to breaking into the offices of the Western Molding Company, stealing company checks, forging and then cashing them. The pair were placed on probation for two years, after which they were allowed to plead not guilty and "cleanse their records".

In 1975, Travis, aged 22, was a member of a seven-person forestry crew led by Carl's older brother Michael H. Rogers, aged 28. The year prior, Rogers had won a bid for a federal contract to thin out small trees from an area known as Turkey Springs in the Apache-Sitgreaves National Forests when he underbid two other contractors. The Turkey Springs job called for the thinning of 1,277 acres by August 1975. Rogers requested, and was granted, an extension until November 10. On October 16, a Forestry Service inspector visited the site and concluded the job could not possibly be completed by the deadline. Failure to complete the job could lead to a $2,500 penalty and a disqualification from bidding on future Forestry Service contracts.

On October 20, Rogers wrote to his Forestry Service contracting officer: "I cannot honestly say whether or not we will finish on time. However, we are working every day with as much manpower as I can hire. I will not stop work until the job is finished or until I am asked to stop. I have had considerable trouble keeping a full crew on the job. The area is very thick and the guys have poor morale because of this.... We will keep working and trying hard."

=== Barney Hill and NBC's The UFO Incident ===
Comparison between The UFO Incident starring James Earl Jones (top) and Travis Walton's account, as illustrated on the cover of his book (bottom). The latter is a revised edition reprinted under the name of the 1993 film adaptation. Both works depict a motorist who walks into the woods toward an overhead glow, at which point, he is illuminated by a beam of light.

On October 20, 1975, the same night that Rogers wrote to the Forestry Service, the NBC network aired a prime-time special: The UFO Incident, a made-for-TV movie about an alleged alien abduction. The film starred James Earl Jones as Barney Hill, who had undergone a hypnosis session with a psychiatrist in 1964, after which he reported recollections of an alien abduction. Regressive hypnosis is widely deemed controversial due to the heightened risk of confabulation.

The film aired two weeks before the Travis Walton UFO incident. Later researchers suggested that Rogers and Walton could have been inspired by the film to concoct their own alleged abduction story. Psychologists and skeptics argued in a 2009 review that, "after viewing this movie, any person with a little imagination could now become an instant celebrity" by claiming an abduction. They concluded that "one of those instant celebrities was Travis Walton".

According to researcher Philip J. Klass' 1989 book UFO Abductions: A Dangerous Game, shortly before his disappearance, Travis had reportedly told his mother not to worry if he were ever abducted by aliens because he would return safe and sound.

== Incident ==
On November 5, 1975, crew chief Michael H. Rogers reported Travis Walton missing to the Navajo County sheriff. Six members of the crew claimed they were driving down a forest road when they saw an illuminated object above the ground near the roadway. They reported that Walton got out of the truck and ran towards the object, which shone a light on him. They said that they drove away in fear, only to return 15 minutes later to find both Walton and the light missing. At 7:45 p.m., a member of the logging crew called police officer L. C. Ellison. Officer Ellison, Sheriff Marlin Gillespie, and Deputy Kenneth Coplan drove to Heber to meet with the loggers. According to a 1983 account, Rogers and two crew members agreed to return to Turkey Springs with the three officers, while the three other crew members refused to return and instead drove home in Rogers's vehicle. The six men searched Turkey Springs until shortly after midnight, when Sheriff Gillespie paused the search until dawn.

Around 1:30 a.m., Navajo County Deputy Sheriff Kenneth Coplan and Rogers visited Walton's mother. According to Coplan, when he informed her of the disappearance, she said, "Well, that's the way these things happen." Coplan said he was shocked by how calmly she took the news and her general lack of surprise. Walton, his older brother Duane, and his mother were described by the sheriff at the time as "longtime students of UFOs". Because Travis Walton's mother lived in a ranch house without telephone service, Rogers drove her into town so she could call Travis's brother Duane and their sister while Coplan followed. Around 3:00 a.m., Walton's mother called her daughter, waking her; Deputy Coplan was again shocked at how well Travis's family took the news.

=== Missing person investigation ===
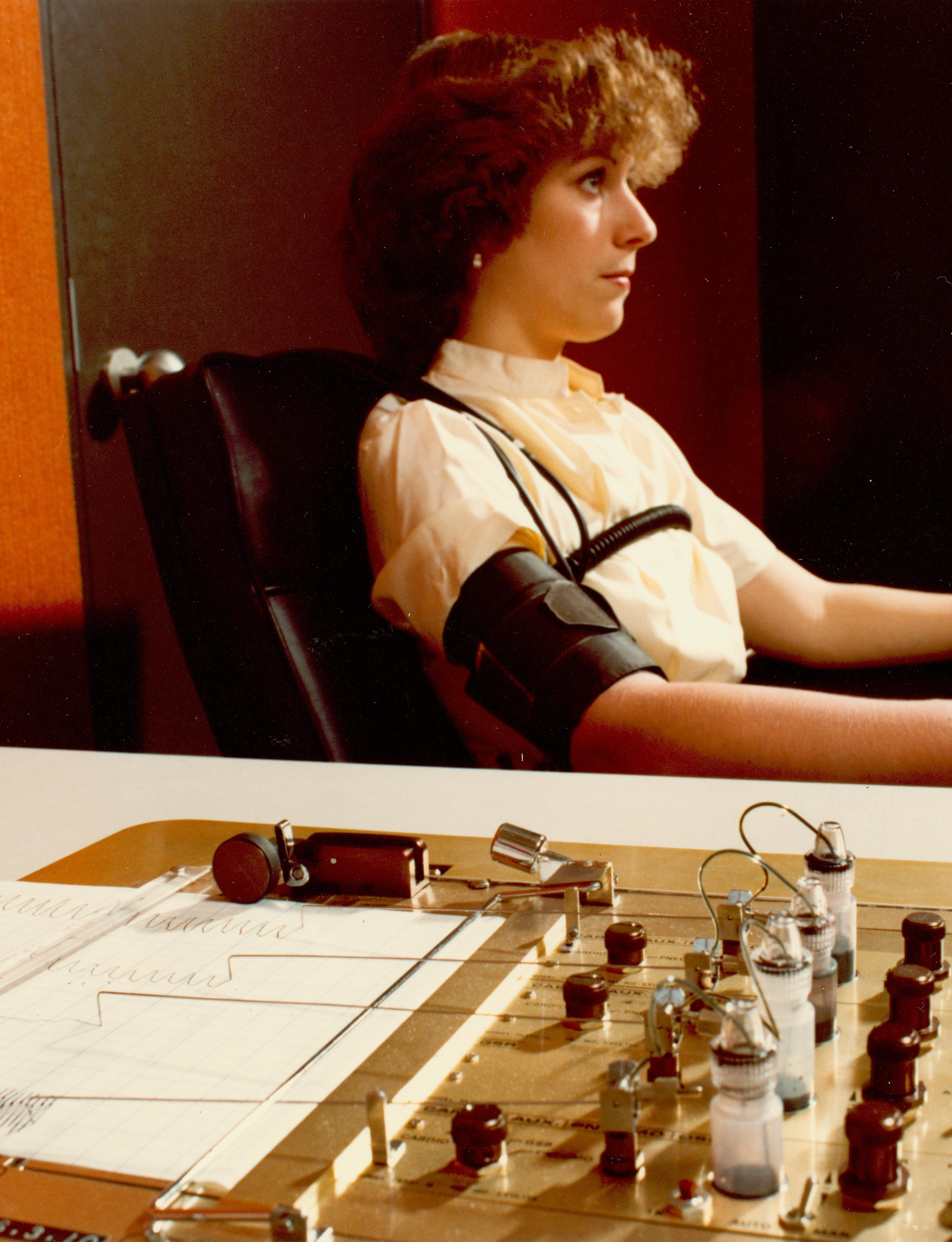
Polygraph examinations have and continue to be a common technique in law enforcement, despite scientific studies repeatedly challenging their accuracy.

The following day, November 7, a search party of nearly 50 people scoured the Turkey Springs area, but failed to find Travis or any signs of an altercation. Law enforcement were surprised when, after a few hours, Travis's mother told them "I don't think there is any use of looking any further. He's not around here. I don't think he's on this earth." Sheriff Gillespie dismissed the volunteers. But the following morning, November 8, Rogers and Duane Walton complained in person about the discontinued search. As a result, Sheriff Gillespie assembled another search party, which included a helicopter.

Regional papers covered the story on November 8. That day, a member of a Phoenix-based UFO interest group recorded a 65-minute interview with crew chief Mike Rogers and Travis's older brother Duane Walton. At no point during the interview did either reportedly express any fear or concern for Travis; rather, they expressed confidence that Travis would be returned. During the interview, Rogers discussed the Forestry contract, saying "This contract we have is seriously behind schedule. In fact, Monday the time is up. We haven't done any work on it since Wednesday because of this thing, and therefore it won't be done. I hope they take that into account." Forestry contracts included an Act of God clause that excused contractors who were delinquent due to unforeseeable circumstances.

During the interview, Duane revealed that he, Travis, and their mother were UFO buffs who had previously discussed that if they ever saw a UFO, they would "immediately get directly under the object" because the "opportunity" to go aboard a UFO would be "too great to pass up". Duane repeatedly insisted that Travis was "not even missing. He knows where he's at and I know where he's at".

On November 9, law enforcement continued the search for Travis until late afternoon, when Walton's mother again requested the search be halted. By November 10, stories of Walton's disappearance were being published throughout the US, UK, and Canada. On November 11, the press reported that Travis's mother felt any further searching for Travis would be useless. Also on November 11, Rogers and the five other members of the forestry crew were interrogated by Arizona Dept. of Public Safety polygraph examiner C. E. Gilson to determine if the men had murdered Travis Walton. All denied having harmed Travis—Gilson opined that five out of the six men were being truthful and described results for the sixth man, Allen Dalis, as "inconclusive".

=== Walton returns ===
On November 11, press reported that Walton had been found. Walton had placed a collect call to his sister's home from a payphone in Heber, Arizona. Walton reached his sister's husband, Grant Neff, who drove to pick up Duane and proceeded to Heber to pick up Travis; Neff later reported he initially thought the caller was intoxicated. As part of the collect call procedure, Travis told the operator his name; she recognized his name as that of the missing man and alerted Sheriff Gillespie, who dispatched a deputy to the family ranch house.

Deputy Glen Flake arrived at 2:00 a.m., where he witnessed Duane Walton transferring fuel from one car to another after having forgotten to purchase gas before local stations closed. Flake did not reveal that they knew Travis had returned home, and Duane did not tell the deputy that Travis had been found.

Seeking medical attention for Travis, Duane reached out to a UFO researcher he'd met days prior; the researcher referred them to Lester Steward, a hypnotherapist. Duane took Travis to meet with Steward, but his first words were that Travis needed a medical examination with lab tests and was not ready for hypnotic regression. Steward noted that Travis seemed "very confused" and reminiscent of drug addicts he'd treated. Steward also noted that Travis had a small lesion on the inside crease of his right elbow, consistent with intravenous drug use. After meeting with Steward, the Waltons returned to Duane's home. Once there, UFO researchers arranged a house call by two medical doctors who were also amateur UFO investigators.

When they arrived at 3:00 p.m., Duane forbade them to use their camera or tape recorder, nor would he allow them to ask Travis questions about his experience. The doctors noted the presence of the apparent puncture mark and estimated it to be 24 to 48 hours old.

That day, stories of Travis's return had begun to spread. The press began calling Duane's home in an attempt to reach Travis. Duane finally informed law enforcement of Travis's return, calling Sheriff Gillespie, who insisted on seeing Travis immediately. The sheriff drove the four hours into Glendale and arrived at 11:00 p.m. that night. Duane and Travis demanded that Sheriff Gillespie not record the interview.

After a local UFO group facilitated the connection, Duane and Travis moved into a suite at the Sheraton Inn in Scottsdale; the costs were covered by The National Enquirer in exchange for exclusive access to Walton and his story. On November 14, Travis skipped a polygraph interview with police.

That night, in the presence of Enquirer reporters, a doctor associated with a UFO group had a two-hour conversation with a hypnotized Travis about the incident. The following day, November 15, Travis was interviewed by Jack McCarthy, a freelance polygraph examiner whose involvement was arranged by a UFO group and the Enquirer. McCarthy concluded that Travis was engaged in a "gross deception" and had even been intentionally holding his breath in an attempt to "beat the machine".

On November 22, Travis appeared on Phoenix television station KOOL, where he was interviewed about the incident. Travis claimed that he had lost consciousness when struck by a beam of light, and that he awoke in a hospital-like room, being observed by three short, bald humanoids. He says that he fought with them until a human wearing a helmet led Walton to another room, where he blacked out as three other humans put a clear plastic mask over his face. Walton has said that he remembers nothing else until he found himself walking along a highway five days later, with the flying saucer departing above him.

== Publicity and popular culture ==
External videos
- Walton, Schaeffer, and Hynek interviewed on Geraldo Rivera's "Good Night America" (June 9, 1977)

In the days following Walton's UFO claim, The National Enquirer awarded Walton and his co-workers a $5,000 prize for "best UFO case of the year" after they were said to have passed polygraph tests administered by the Enquirer and the Aerial Phenomena Research Organization (APRO). Ufologist Jim Ledwith said, "For five days, the authorities thought he'd been murdered by his co-workers, and then he was returned." According to Ledwith, "all of the co-workers who were there, who saw the spacecraft, they all took polygraph tests, and they all passed, except for one, and that one was inconclusive."

Skeptics assert the story is an example of a UFO hoax promoted by a credulous media circus with the resulting publicity exploited by Walton to make money. UFO researcher Philip J. Klass, who agreed that Walton's story was a hoax perpetrated for financial gain, identified many discrepancies in the accounts of Walton and his co-workers. After investigating the case, Klass reported that the polygraph tests were "poorly administered", that Walton used "polygraph countermeasures", such as holding his breath, and that Klass uncovered an earlier failed test administered by an examiner who concluded the case involved "gross deception".

In 1978, Walton wrote the book The Walton Experience detailing his claims. In 1993, the book served as the inspiration for the 1993 film Fire in the Sky, starring Robert Patrick as Mike Rogers, D. B. Sweeney as Travis Walton, Craig Sheffer as Allan Dallis, Peter Berg as David Whitlock, and Georgia Emelin as Dana Rogers. Travis Walton made a cameo in the film. Paramount Pictures decided that Walton's account was "too fuzzy and too similar to other televised close encounters", so they ordered screenwriter Tracy Tormé to write a "flashier, more provocative" abduction story. On the opening day of Fire in the Sky – March 12, 1993 – Walton and Mike Rogers appeared on the CNN program Larry King Live, which also featured Philip J. Klass.

Walton has occasionally appeared at UFO conventions or on television. He sponsors his own UFO conference in Arizona called the "Skyfire Summit". In 2008, Walton was analyzed by a private polygrapher and determined to be engaged in deception when he appeared on the Fox game show The Moment of Truth. On January 19, 2021, Walton appeared on episode #1597 of the Joe Rogan Experience podcast. On August 25, 2023, he appeared in the fifth episode of the third season of How To with John Wilson, titled "How to Watch Birds".

== Rogers-Walton dispute of 2021 ==
On March 19, 2021, Mike Rogers posted a statement to his Facebook page announcing "I, Michael H. Rogers, being of sound and rational mind, do hereby give notice that I am no longer to be considered a witness to Travis C. Walton's supposed abduction of November 5, 1975." He later clarified: "Travis tried to keep a new remake of the movie a secret from me. He has always had his big secrets that he has kept from me. It angered me. I tried over the last two weeks to reason with [him], but of no avail. I don’t believe Travis is an honest person, and therefore I want nothing to do with him."

On April 30, Rogers placed a call to producer Ryan Gordon, who was working on a new film about the Walton incident. Gordon recorded the call without Rogers's knowledge, as permitted by Arizona law. Two months later, on July 4, Gordon publicly posted audio from the call which featured Rogers explaining: "All I can remember we were talking in the woods one day, Travis and I. . . . We were talking about creating a UFO hoax, okay? I don't know how the UFO got there. But I remember . . . when I was driving the truck and he jumped out, it was all deliberate. It was all a staged thing, okay? He ran up there and there was something about the UFO not being real, although it looked real. . . . Travis' brother Duane helped him." Rogers and Walton later reconciled and Rogers issued a statement retracting his confession.

== Modern views ==
=== Waltons as UFO buffs and pranksters ===
Mike Rogers and the Waltons were known for their interest in UFOs. One member of the crew recalled Mike Rogers and Travis Walton arguing about how UFOs can fly. Rogers later acknowledged he had watched "the first part" of the recent television special that dramatized the Barney Hill "alien abduction" case, while the Waltons acknowledged prior discussions of wanting to be taken aboard a UFO. The Walton family long had a reputation for pranks and practical jokes. One neighboring family, the Gibsons, recalled being the target of multiple pranks.

Within four months of the incident, UFO author Raymond E. Fowler, himself a believer in UFOs and abductions, proposed that some members of the crew had been the victim of a hoax perpetrated by others in the crew. Authors including Klass and Pflock argue that Travis Walton and Mike Rogers planned the incident.

==== Steve Pierce's allegations of a hoax ====
As early as 1978, crew member Steve Pierce expressed suspicion that the incident had been a hoax. Pierce noted that on the day of the incident, Rogers made the crew stay past dark whereas they usually ended work at 4:00 p.m. Pierce recalled that Walton did not work at all during the day of the incident; instead, he slept in the truck while claiming to be ill "from carousing too much". He also reported that Mike Rogers disappeared from the worksite for two hours that day.

Upon being driven to Gentry Tower by producer Ryan Gordon in 2026, Pierce reported that his suspicions about the incident having actually been a hoax orchestrated by Walton against other crew members had risen to a level of "100%" confidence.

==== Rogers confession of a hoax ====
Mike Rogers's daughter reported that Rogers — who died in February 2026 — made a deathbed confession affirming the incident was a hoax in which he had participated. Robert Sheaffer explained:

Mike Rogers died this past February. According to his daughter, he made a deathbed confession of the Travis Walton hoax. Rogers had "confessed" this in 2021 in a phone call with Ryan Gordon, but then retracted his confession soon afterward. Rogers also reportedly "confessed" to his daughter to having hoaxed the famous Phoenix Lights using balloons or something, which is preposterous. Those "lights" traveled 400 miles in less than an hour, so they were obviously aircraft. Frankly, this detracts from the credibility of Rogers' other confession, although I still don't doubt it.

=== National Enquirer misrepresented polygraph results ===
Authors including Michael Shermer and Philip Klass note that while the National Enquirer tabloid publicized the opinion of a private polygraph examiner who reported the witnesses as being truthful, it omitted all mention of Walton's prior polygraph examiner who concluded Walton was being "grossly deceptive". They further note that while law enforcement had conducted a polygraph examination of the crew during their missing persons investigation into Walton's disappearance, the objective of that investigation was to determine whether the crew had killed Walton, not to investigate UFOs. Thus, they asked only four questions: three about violence against Walton and one asking if an unusual object was observed.

Science writer and skeptic Michael Shermer opined: "I think the polygraph is not a reliable determiner of truth. I think Travis Walton was not abducted by aliens. In both cases, the power of deception and self-deception is all we need to understand what really happened in 1975 and after."

=== Contrast with alien abduction syndrome ===
In the 1980s, reports of alien abductions became more widespread, due to the increased dissemination of alleged accounts by authors such as Budd Hopkins, John E. Mack, and Whitley Strieber. Folklorist Thomas E. Bullard notes that stories of alien abductions exhibit a fairly consistent sequence and description of events. Scholars like psychologist Susan A. Clancy and skeptic Susan Blackmore have suggested the alien abduction narrative is the result of sleep paralysis or false memory syndrome.

Walton didn't report paralysis, recovered memories, or other common elements of an "alien abduction" narrative, leading Fire in the Sky screenwriter Tracy Tormé to opine "I don't think the Travis case is an abduction case . . . it doesn't fit any of the other patterns as in the cases that were explored in [Budd Hopkins's book] Intruders. . . . So many witnesses, gone for five days. . . . So I think all those things break the mold and make this case unique." Philip J. Klass noted that "a 'UFO-Abduction Mold' did not yet exist in 1975".

=== Possible role of fire lookout tower ===
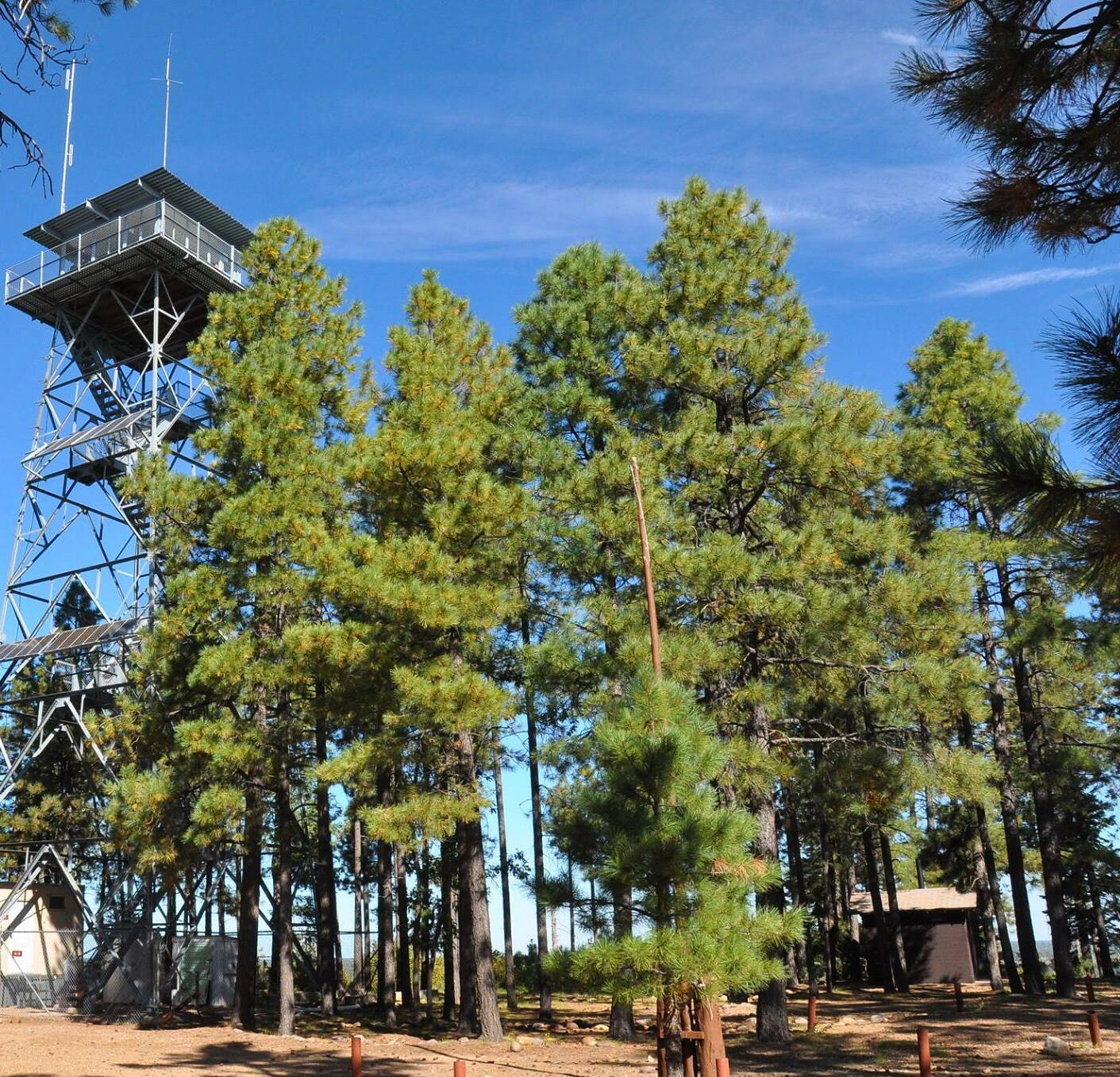
The crew normally traveled to and from Turkey Springs by way of Black Canyon Road, a 16.5-mile (26.6 km) bumpy, low-speed dirt road which passed by the Gibson Ranch House where the Waltons were allowed to live. But on the night of the Walton incident, the crew may have returned by way of Rim Road, a smoother, graded road that passed the Gentry Fire Lookout Tower (top).

Robert Sheaffer, a long-time writer for Skeptical Inquirer and a founding member of the UFO Subcommittee of the Committee for Skeptical Inquiry, has argued for decades that the Walton incident was a hoax. Starting in 2021, Sheaffer promoted the hypothesis that Rogers and the Waltons made use of a nearby fire lookout tower to achieve their hoax.

While the crew typically traveled back to Heber via Black Canyon Road, Sheaffer suggests they returned that night via Rim Road, which passes by Gentry Tower: a 70-foot-tall (21 m) Forest Service fire lookout tower equipped with a generator, a 200-square-foot (19 m^{2}) living space for the lookout, an outer metal catwalk, and a spotlight. Sheaffer suggests Travis walked towards the tower, which was brightly lit above the tree tops, until an accomplice in the tower illuminated him with the spotlight. Sheaffer proposes that when Rogers later drove the crew back to the supposed abduction site, they actually arrived at a different spot entirely—one closer to their Turkey Springs site.

== See also ==
- List of reported UFO sightings
- List of solved missing person cases: 1950–1999
- Pascagoula incident
