= Yellowroot =

Yellowroot is a common name for two plants native to Eastern North America. These plants contain the compound berberine, which gives the roots a yellow color, and have been employed in herbal medicine.

Yellowroot may refer to:

- Hydrastis canadensis, also known as goldenseal
- Xanthorhiza simplicissima
Plants called yellowroot
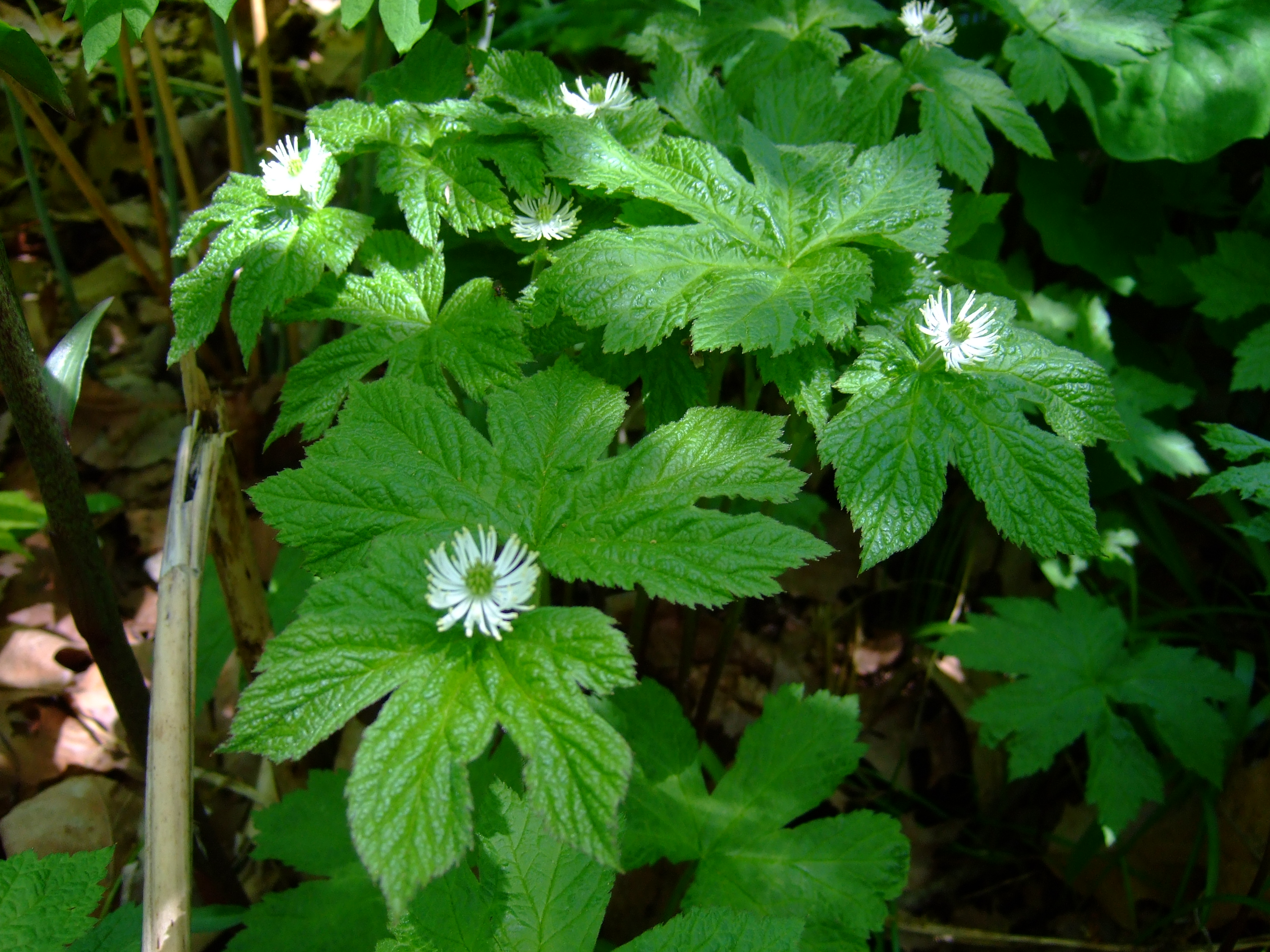
Hydrastis canadensis

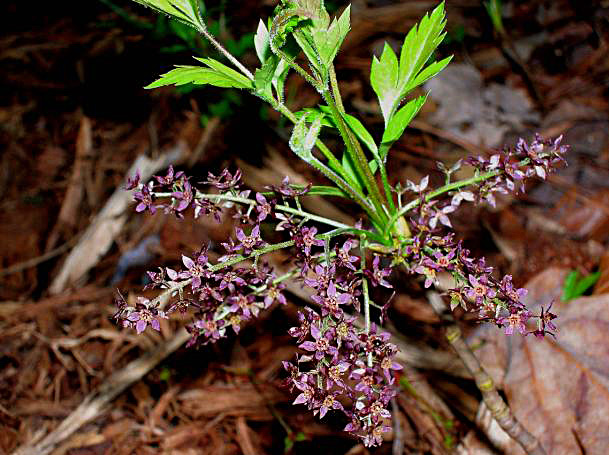
Xanthorhiza simplicissima
