= Hansen (surname) =

Hansen or Hanssen (Danish pronunciation: [ˈhænsn̩]) is a Scandinavian patronymic surname, meaning "son of Hans". As of 2008, it is the third most common surname in Denmark, shared by 4.3% of the population. As of 2016, Hansen is the single most common surname in Norway, not counting spelling variations such as Hanssen, which are also quite common. In the Faroe Islands, Hansen is the second most common surname, while in the North German federal states of Schleswig-Holstein and Hamburg, it is the third and fifth most common surname, respectively. In Sweden the parallel form is Hansson. The frequent occurrences of Hansen as a surname outside Denmark, Norway and Schleswig-Holstein is due to Danish immigration, though Nordic immigrants to English-speaking countries often anglicised their names to Hanson in order to accommodate English orthographic rules.

== Notable people ==
Notable people with the surname include:

=== Arts and entertainment ===
- Aime Hansen (born 1962), Estonian poet, writer, and artist
- Al Hansen (1927–1995), American artist
- Andrew Hansen (born 1974), Australian comedian
- Anna Hansen, Canadian chef
- Asta Hansen (1914–1962), Danish stage and film actress
- Beck Hansen, (born 1970), American alternative musician known as Beck
- Betsy Hansen (dates unknown), woman who charged actor Errol Flynn with statutory rape in 1942
- Carl G. O. Hansen (1871–1960), Norwegian-American journalist, musician and author
- Carl William Hansen (1872–1936), Danish author
- Chai Hansen (born Surachai Romruen, 1989), Thai-Australian actor
- Chris Hansen (born 1959), American journalist
- Christian Frederik Hansen (1756–1845), Danish architect
- Constantin Hansen (1804–1880), Danish artist
- Courtney Hansen (born 1974), American model and television personality
- C. & V. Hansen (1906–2001 & 1900–1992), Danish comics authors
- Craig J. Hansen (born 1954), American writer and musician
- Dinah-Jane Hansen (born 1997), Singer of Female American group Fifth Harmony
- David Hansen (born 1968), actor, director, and playwright
- Derek Hansen (born 1944), Australian writer
- Erhardine Adolphine Hansen (1815–1893), Danish actress
- Erik Hansen (1927–2016), Danish architect
- Erik Fosnes Hansen (born 1965), Norwegian author
- Gunnar Hansen (1947–2015), Icelandic-American actor
- Ib Hansen, pseudonym of Austrian poet H. C. Artmann (1921–2000)
- Jane Hansen (businesswoman), Australian businesswoman and arts philanthropist
- Jens Marni Hansen (born 1974), Faroese musician
- Jerry Hansen (1927–2012), Ghanaian highlife musician
- Joachim Hansen (1930–2007), German actor
- Johannes Hansen (1903–1995), Danish sculptor
- Joseph Hansen (1923–2004), author
- Joseph Hansen (1842–1907), Belgian dancer
- Julia Kathrine Hansen (born 2003), Danish singer
- Kai Hansen (born 1963), German power metal musician
- Karl Gustav Hansen (1914–2002), Danish silversmith, designer
- Leopold Hansen (1879–1964), Estonian actor and theater director
- Liane Hansen (born 1951), American radio journalist and radio show host
- Lisa M. Hansen, American producer, actress, assistant director, and writer
- Lys Hansen (born 1936), Scottish artist
- Margaret Severin-Hansen, American ballerina
- Marie Bach Hansen (born 1985), Danish actress
- Mary Hansen (1966–2002), Australian guitarist and singer
- Max Hansen (1897–1961), Danish singer
- Peter Hansen (1921–2017), American actor
- Ron Hansen (born 1947), American novelist, essayist, and professor
- Nolan Hansen (born 1998), American YouTuber

== Politics ==
- Ann Hansen (born 1953), Canadian anarchist and bomber
- Bernie Hansen (1944–2021), American politician in Chicago politics
- Bertha Lee Hansen (1882–1966), American politician from Minnesota
- Cecilie Liv Hansen (born 2001), Danish politician
- Charles Robert Hansen (1909–2000), American businessman and politician from Minnesota
- Charlotte Bagge Hansen (born 1969), Danish politician
- Clifford Hansen (1912–2009), American politician from Wyoming
- Colin Hansen (born 1952), Canadian politician from British Columbia
- Connor Hansen (1913–1987), American jurist from Wisconsin
- Dave Hansen (born 1947), American politician from Wisconsin
- Eva Kjer Hansen (born 1964), Danish politician
- Even Hansen (1790–1840), Norwegian civil servant and politician
- Flemming Hansen (1939–2021), Danish politician
- George V. Hansen (1930–2014), American politician from Idaho
- Glenna Hansen (born 1956), Canadian Inuvialuit politician
- Goeff Hansen (born 1959), American politician from Michigan
- H. C. Hansen (1906–1960), Danish Prime Minister (1955–1960)
- Hans Peter Hansen (politician) (1872–1953), Danish journalist and politician
- Hans Rasmus Hansen (1896–1971), Danish politician
- Holger Hansen (1929–2015), Danish politician and academic
- Ian Hansen (1958–2025), Falkland Islands politician
- James V. Hansen (1932–2018), American politician from Utah
- Jørgen Peder Hansen (1923–1994), Danish politician
- Joseph Hansen (1910–1979), American Trotskyist and leader of the American Socialist Workers Party
- Karstein Hansen (born 1932), Norwegian politician
- Laurits Hansen (1894–1965), Danish trade unionist and politician
- Lawrence N. Hansen (1940–2010), American lawyer and political activist
- Litten Hansen (born 1944), Danish former actress, activist and politician
- Mathias Willassen Hanssen (born 1997), Norwegian politician
- Merle Hansen (1919–2009), American farmer, Founder of the North American Farm Alliance
- Nils Hansen (born 1988), German politician
- Peter Hansen (UN) (born 1941), Danish UN official
- Robert W. Hansen (1911–1977), American jurist from Wisconsin
- Ron Hansen (1943–2022), Canadian politician from Ontario
- Stephanie Hansen (born 1961), American politician from Delaware
- Urban Hansen (1908–1986), Danish politician
- Victor Davis Hanson (born 1953), American political commentator
- Vootele Hansen (1962–2026), Estonian politician
- Werner Hansen (1905–19971), German politician

== Science ==
- Alvin Harvey Hansen (1887–1975) American economist
- Emil Christian Hansen (1842–1910), Danish fermentation physiologist
- Gerhard Armauer Hansen (1841–1912), Norwegian physician, discover of the cause of leprosy
- Hans Jacob Hansen (1855–1936), Danish zoologist
- James E. Hansen (born 1941), American climatologist
- Jens Christian Hansen (1932–2014), Norwegian geographer
- Jeremy Hansen (born 1976), Canadian astronaut
- Julie Vinter Hansen (1890–1960), Danish astronomer
- Per Brinch Hansen (1938–2007), Danish computer scientist
- Peter Andreas Hansen (1795–1874), Danish astronomer
- Samantha Hansen, American seismologist
- Siegfried Hansen (1912–2002), Danish engineer
- Thomas Blom Hansen (born 1958), Danish anthropologist
- W. W. Hansen (1909–1949), American physicist

== Sport ==
- Abraham Løkin Hansen (born 1959), Faroese footballer (né Hansen)
- Adam Hansen (born 1981), Australian road cyclist
- Adrian Hansen (born 1971), South African squash player
- Alan Hansen (born 1955), Scottish footballer
- Ashia Hansen (born 1971), British athlete, Olympic contestant
- Bob Hansen (born 1961), American basketballer
- Brendan Hansen (born 1981), American swimmer
- Chad Hansen (born 1995), American football player
- Chase Hansen (born 1993), American football player
- Craig Hansen (born 1983), American professional baseball player
- Curt Hansen (born 1964), Danish chess grand master
- Dale Hansen (born 1948), American sportscaster
- Dave Hansen (born 1968), American baseball player
- Einar Hansen (born 1988), Faroese soccer player
- Eric Hansen (born 1992), Canadian chess player
- Erika Hansen (born 1970), American swimmer\
- Fred Hansen (born 1940), 1964 Olympic Gold medalist and world record pole vaulter
- Fred Hansen (footballer) (1903–1993), Australian rules footballer
- Harrison Hansen (born 1985), British based New Zealand rugby league player
- Hayden Hansen (born 2003), American football player
- Jan Knobelauch Hansen (born 1971), Danish Olympic triathlete
- Janken Wiel-Hansen (1868–1938) Norwegian-Swedish athlete, feminist, pioneer in fencing and swordsmanship
- Jannik Hansen (born 1986), Danish ice hockey player
- Jens Smedegaard Hansen (born 1957), Danish sprinter
- Jerry Hansen (racing driver) (born 1936), former racing driver
- Joachim Hansen (born 1979), Norwegian mixed martial artist
- Joan Hansen (born 1958), American long-distance runner
- John Hansen (1924–1990), Danish footballer
- John Hansen (born 1950), Scottish footballer
- Johnny Hansen (born 1943), Danish footballer
- Kenneth Hansen (born 1960), Swedish rallycross driver
- Kevin Hansen (born 1982), American indoor volleyball player
- Kim-Rune Hansen (born 1988), Norwegian snowboarder
- Kinzie Hansen (born 2001), American softball player
- Lars Hanssen (1903–1940), Norwegian chess player
- Mack Hansen (born 1998), Australian born Irish rugby player
- Martin Lundgaard Hansen (born 1972), Danish badminton player, Olympic contestant
- Mattes Hansen (born 2004), German footballer
- Mikkel Hansen (born 1987), Danish handballer
- Nancy Hansen (born 1968), Canadian sport climber and mountaineer
- Niels Jørgen Hansen, Danish darts player
- Niko Hansen (born 1994), Danish footballer
- Nikolaj Hansen (born 1987), Danish footballer
- Nikolaj Hansen (born 1993), Danish footballer
- Paul Snow-Hansen (born 1990), New Zealand sailor
- Per Joar Hansen (born 1965), Norwegian football coach
- Phil Hansen (born 1968), American former gridiron football player
- Rasmus Grønborg Hansen (born 1986), Danish football (soccer) player
- Rick Hansen (born 1957), Canadian paraplegic athlete and humanitarian
- Ron Hansen (born 1938), American professional baseball player
- Søren Hansen (born 1974), Danish professional golfer
- Stan Hansen (born 1949), American professional wrestler
- Steen Hansen Danish curler
- Steve Hansen (born 1959), New Zealand rugby union football player and coach
- Sune Berg Hansen (born 1971), Danish chess player
- Tori Hansen (born 2001), American professional footballer
- Travis Hansen (born 1978), American basketball player
- Trine Hansen (born 1973), Danish rower

== Other people ==
- Danielle Tumminio Hansen (born 1981), American Episcopal priest and academic
- Dörte Hansen (born 1964), German journalist
- Elaine Tuttle Hansen, president of Bates College
- Evan Hansen, the titular fictional character of the musical Dear Evan Hansen
- Georg Emil Hansen (1833–1891), Danish photographer
- Georg Hansen (1904–1944), German army officer
- Gesa Hansen (born 1981), German-Danish designer
- Gus Hansen (born 1974), Danish professional poker player
- Helmer Hanssen (1870–1956), Norwegian polar explorer
- Henriette Hansen (disambiguation)
- Jake Hansen (disambiguation), multiple people
- Jane Hansen (businesswoman), Australian businesswoman and arts philanthropist
- Jane Hansen (model), New Zealand model, winner of Miss International 1971
- John Hansen (born 1945), retired New Zealand judge
- Jörmundur Ingi Hansen (born 1940), Icelandic neopagan leader and clothing retailer
- Lars Peter Hansen (born 1952), American economist and econometrician
- Matthew Hansen, Canadian screenwriter, author and editor
- Max Hansen (1908–1990), SS officer
- Mogens Herman Hansen (1940–2024), Danish classical philologist
- Monica Hansen, Norwegian model
- Percy Hansen (1890–1951), Danish recipient of the Victoria Cross
- Robert Hanssen (1944–2023), American FBI agent convicted of spying for Russia
- Sig Hansen (born 1966), American fishing boat captain, featured in the documentary Deadliest Catch
- Theodore Marcus Hansen (1886–1973), Danish-American pastor, theologian, and churchman
- Theophil Freiherr von Hansen (1813–1891), Danish-Austrian architect

== See also ==
- Hansen (disambiguation)
- Henson (name), given name and surname
