= Charles Hanson (disambiguation) =

Charles Hanson (born 1978) is a British auctioneer and television personality. Charles Hanson may also refer to:

- Sir Charles Hanson, 1st Baronet (1846–1921), MP for Bodmin in Cornwall
- Sir Charles Hanson, 2nd Baronet (1874–1958), Lord Lieutenant of the City of London, and High Sheriff of Cornwall
- Charles E. Hanson (1855–1932), Wisconsin State Assemblyman
- Charles S. Hanson (1911–1994), justice of the South Dakota Supreme Court

== See also ==
- Charles Hansen (disambiguation)
- Charlie Hanson (fl. 1980s–2020s), British producer and director
- Hanson (surname)
