= Hanson (surname) =

Hanson is an Anglicized English surname of Scandinavian and German origin, created from the two words Hans and son (son of Hans). Spoken in English by a German or Swedish immigrant to America, for example, the sound of Hans' son comes out sounding like Hansson, shortened to Hanson. In this same example, an immigrant from Norway would have a different accent, resulting in the sound of Hans' sen, or Hanssen, shortened to Hansen.

Hanson is a Jewish (Ashkenazic) surname, phonetically deriving from the Hebrew name Hanna, Chana or חנה, meaning "God has favored me". It likely originates from Scandinavian Jewish communities in Norway, Sweden and Denmark prior to the Holocaust. People with the name include:

== A ==
- Alexander Contee Hanson, American lawyer, publisher, and statesman
- A. M. Hanson (Alexander Mark Hanson, born 1969), artist and photographer
- Alexander Hanson (actor) (born 1961), British actor
- Alexander Contee Hanson Sr. (1749–1806), attorney and chancellor of Maryland
- Alf Hanson (1912–1993), British football player
- Aline Hanson (1949–2017), Saint Martin educator and politician
- Ann Meekitjuk Hanson (born 1946), Canadian politician, commissioner of Nunavut
- Ann-Louise Hanson (born 1944), Swedish singer
- Arin Hanson (born 1987), American animator, voice actor, Internet personality

== B ==
- Benedict H. Hanson (died 1882), American politician
- Beverly Hanson (1925–2014), American golfer
- Bill Hanson (basketball) (born c. 1940), professional basketball player
- Brooke Hanson (born 1978), Australian swimmer and Olympic gold medal winner
- Brooke Hanson (born 1981), current coach and former professional volleyball player

== C ==
- Sir Charles Hanson, 1st Baronet (1846–1922), British MP and Lord Mayor of London
- Sir Charles Hanson, 2nd Baronet (1874–1958), British politician
- Charlie Hanson, British producer and director
- Chris Hanson (born 1976), American football player
- Chris Hanson (born 1985), English golfer
- Christian Hanson (footballer) (born 1981), British football player
- Christian Hanson (ice hockey) (born 1986), American ice hockey player
- C. J. Hanson (born 2001), American football player
- Curt Hanson (1943–2017), American politician
- Curtis Hanson (1945–2016), American film director

== D ==
- David Hanson (disambiguation)
- Duane Hanson (1925–1996), American sculptor

== E ==
- Edward Hanson (1889–1959), United States Navy Rear admiral
- Einar Hanson (1899–1927), Swedish film actor
- Elizabeth Hanson (born 1951), Canadian politician
- Elizabeth Hanson (captive) (1684–c. 1737), American colonist
- Elizabeth Hanson (CIA officer) (1979–2009), American intelligence officer
- Ephraim Hanson (1872–1952), justice of the Utah Supreme Court
- Erik Hanson (baseball) (born 1965), American baseball player

== F ==
- Frederick Hanson (late 20th century), Australian Commissioner of the New South Wales Police 1972–1976
- Fritz Hanson (1914–1996), American-born Canadian football player

== G ==
- Gillian Hanson (1934–1996), British physician
- Glen Hanson, Canadian cartoonist and illustrator
- Greg Hanson (born 1967), American Operations Manager

== H ==
- Hamza Yusuf Hanson (born 1958), American Muslim scholar and director of the Zaytuna Institute, California
- Harold Hanson (disambiguation)
- Hart Hanson (born 1957), American creator of TV series Bones
- Hector A. Hanson (1904–1993), American farmer and politician
- Helen Hanson (1874–1926), British physician, missionary and suffragist
- Herman W. Hanson (1859–1938), American politician
- Howard Hanson (1896–1981), American composer, conductor and educator

== I ==
- Isaac Hanson (born 1980), American pop/rock musician

== J ==
- Jake Hanson (born 1997), American football player
- James Hanson, Baron Hanson (1922–2004), English industrialist
- Jimmy Hanson (footballer, born 1904) (1904–?), English footballer for Manchester United
- James Hanson (footballer, born 1987), English footballer for Grimsby Town
- Jamie Hanson (born 1995), English footballer for Derby County
- James Hanson (rugby union) (born 1988), Australian rugby union player (hooker) for Queensland Reds
- James C. Hanson (1862–1946), American politician
- Jane Hanson (born 1955), American television host
- Janine Hanson (born December 14, 1982), a Canadian rower from Winnipeg
- Jason Hanson (born 1970), American professional football player
- Jeff Hanson (1978–2009), American singer-songwriter
- Jeffrey O. Hanson (1958–2006), American politician
- Jennifer Hanson (born 1974), American country singer
- Jimmy Hanson (1904–?), English football player
- Jo Hanson (1918–2007), American environmental artist and activist
- Joe Hanson (soccer) (born 2003), Canadian soccer player
- Joel Hanson (contemporary), American singer and guitarist
- John Hanson (disambiguation), several people
- Jutta Hanson (born 1967), German electrical engineering professor

== K ==
- Kristine Hanson (born 1951), American Playboy Playmate and television weather person
- Kristy Hanson (born 1981), American singer-songwriter

== L ==
- Lars Hanson (1886–1965), Swedish stage and film actor
- Leah Hanson, American politician
- Linda N. Hanson, President of Hamline University
- Lyle Hanson (1935–2020), American politician

== M ==
- Marcy Hanson (born 1952), American Playboy Playmate and actress
- Margaret Murray Hanson, astronomer
- Margus Hanson (born 1958), Estonian politician
- Mark Hanson (born 1946), Presiding Bishop of the Evangelical Lutheran Church in America
- Marla Hanson (born 1962), American screenwriter and ex-model
- Martin Hanson (born 1971), Swedish football referee
- Marv Hanson (1943–2004), American politician
- Maryhelen Hanson (born 1946), American ballerina
- Matt Hanson (author) (born 1971), British author, film producer and film director
- Matt Hanson (politician), American politician
- Mitchell Hanson (born 1988), English football defender

== N ==
- Norwood Russell Hanson (1925–1967), American philosopher

== O ==
- Ole Hanson (1874–1940), American real estate developer and politician

== P ==
- Paul D. Hanson (1939–2023), American biblical scholar
- Pauline Hanson (born 1954), Australian politician and television personality
- Per Albin Hansson (1885–1946), Prime Minister of Sweden
- Peter Hanson (born 1971), Swedish golfer
- Peter Hansson, Swedish heavy metal guitarist
- Petter Hansson (born 1976), Swedish footballer
- Pontus Hanson (1894–1962), Swedish breaststroke swimmer and water polo player

== R ==
- Ray Hanson (died 1982), American college football coach
- Raymond Alvah Hanson (1923–2009), American entrepreneur, inventor and engineer
- Raymond Hanson (composer) (1913–1976), Australian composer and lecturer
- Raymond Hanson (cricketer) (born 1951), English cricketer
- Ray Hanson (1895–1982), American football coach
- Sir Reginald Hanson (1840–1905), Lord Mayor of London, Member of Parliament
- Richard Hanson (Canadian politician) (1879–1948), Canadian politician
- Richard Hanson (bishop) (1916–1988), bishop of Clogher in the Church of Ireland, 1970–1973
- Richard Hanson (Australian politician) (1805–1876), British-Australian chief justice of South Australia
- Richard H. Hanson (1931-2023), American politician
- Richard Hanson (Missouri politician), American politician, secretary of state of Missouri in 1994
- Robert Hanson (disambiguation), several people
- Robert M. Hanson (1920–1944), American Marine Corps aviator
- Robin Hanson (born 1959), American professor of economics
- Roger Hanson "Old Flintlock" (1827–1863), general in the American confederate army
- Roger L. Hanson (1925–2005), American politician
- Rudolph Hanson (1903–2002), American lawyer and politician

== S ==
- Sam Hanson (born 1939), Associate Justice of the Minnesota Supreme Court
- Sharon Hanson (born 1965), American heptathlete
- Stephen Hanson (1931–1997), South African cricketer
- Sven Hansson (1912–1971), Swedish cross country skier
- Sven Ove Hansson (born 1951), Swedish academic, philosopher, author and skeptic

== T ==
- T. Anderson Hanson (1819–1912), English merchant and activist
- Taya Hanson (born 2000), Canadian basketball player
- Taylor Hanson (born 1983), American pop/rock musician
- Todd Hanson (born 1968), American writer and voice actor
- Travis Hanson, American rally car driver
- Tony Hanson, Jamaican Basketball Player and Coach

== V ==
- Vic Hanson (1903–1982), American football and basketball player
- Victor Davis Hanson (born 1953), American military historian and political essayist
- Vince Hanson (1923–2009), American basketball player

== W ==
- Walter R. Hanson (1931–2014), American politician

== Z ==
- Zachary Hanson (born 1985), American pop/rock musician

== Fictional characters ==
- Rita Hanson, a character in the 1993 American fantasy romantic comedy movie Groundhog Day
- Roy Hanson, a character in the 1984 American comedy horror film Gremlins
- Tori Hanson, Wind Rangers character in the Power Rangers universe
- Zoey Hanson, main character in the English dub of Tokyo Mew Mew, Mew Mew Power

== See also ==
- Hamson (surname)
- Henson (name), given name and surname
