= Harold Hansen =

Harold Hansen may refer to:

- Harold Hansen (soccer) (born 1946), Canadian soccer player
- Harold Hansen (American football) (1894–1977), American football and basketball coach
- Harold I. Hansen (1914–1992), theatre professor at Brigham Young University
- Harold D. Hansen (1904–1987), United States Marine Corps general

== See also ==
- Harald Hansen (disambiguation)
- Harold Hanson (disambiguation)
