= Henson =

Henson may refer to:

== Places ==
=== United States ===
- Henson, Colorado, a ghost town
- Henson, Missouri, an unincorporated community
- Henson Creek, Colorado
- Henson Branch, Missouri, a stream

=== Antarctica ===
- Mount Henson, Ross Dependency

== Other ==
- Henson (name), a given name and a surname, including a list of people with the name
- USNS Henson, an American oceanographic survey ship
- Henson School of Science and Technology, Salisbury University, Salisbury, Maryland
- Henson Hall, an athletic facility at Dillard University, New Orleans, Louisiana
- Henson Aviation, original name of Piedmont Airlines

== See also ==
- Henson Glacier, Antarctica
- Henson Glacier (Greenland)
- Henson Park, a multi-purpose sports ground in Marrickville, New South Wales, Australia
- Hanson (disambiguation)
