= List of Cushing Academy alumni =

This list of alumni of Cushing Academy includes graduates and students who did not graduate.

- Jalen Adams (born 1995), basketball player for Hapoel Jerusalem in the Israeli Basketball Premier League
- Bobby Allen, professional hockey player
- George W. Anderson, judge of the United States Court of Appeals for the First Circuit
- Paul Thomas Anderson, film director
- Fernando Aristeguieta, professional soccer player
- Richard Bachman, professional hockey player
- Nate Berkus (born 1971), author and television personality
- Zach Bogosian, professional hockey player
- Chris Bourque, professional hockey player
- Ryan Bourque, professional hockey player
- Matt Brown, professional football player
- Arthur Edmund Carewe, actor
- John Cena, WWE wrestler and actor
- Herbert H. Chen, theoretical physicist
- Herbert William Conn, bacteriologist and educator
- Norma Connolly, actress
- Bette Davis, actress
- Sean DePaula, professional baseball player
- Meghan Duggan, U.S. Olympic women's hockey team, silver medal 2010, 2014; gold medal 2018
- Ruth C. Engs, writer
- Mike Evans, professional football player
- Bryan Ewing, professional hockey player
- Amos Foster, basketball and football player and coach
- Bob Fouracre, sportscaster
- Kenny Gamble, professional football player
- Ryan Lannon, professional hockey player
- Erika Lawler, U.S. Olympic women's hockey team, silver medal 2010; NBC Olympic studio hockey analyst
- John Lilley, U.S. Olympic men's hockey team
- Broc Little, professional hockey player
- Brad Malone, professional hockey player
- Ray McLean, professional football player and coach
- Johnny McQuade, professional football player
- Eric Nickulas, professional hockey player
- Brad Norton, professional hockey player
- Jeff Norton, professional hockey player
- Charles Lathrop Parsons, chemist
- Robert J. Peaslee, American lawyer and judge who served as chief justice of the New Hampshire Supreme Court
- Tom Poti, professional hockey player
- Phil Pressey, professional basketball player
- Julian Reichelt, editor of Germany's Bild tabloid
- Ollie Satenstein, professional football player
- Conor Sheary, professional hockey player
- Pete Snyder, entrepreneur
- Frederick Douglass Stubbs, pioneering thoracic surgeon
- Jigme Khesar Namgyal Wangchuck, King of Bhutan
- David Warsofsky (born 1990), NHL ice hockey player
- Ryan Warsofsky (born 1987), NHL ice hockey head coach
- Fred Woodcock, professional baseball player
- Keith Yandle, professional hockey player
