= Hanson =

Hanson or Hansson may refer to:

== People ==
- Hanson (surname)
- Hansson (surname)
- Hanson (wrestler) or Ivar (born 1984), American professional wrestler, born Todd James Smith

== Musical groups ==
- Hanson (band), an American pop rock band
- Hanson (UK band), an English funk rock band
- The Hanson Brothers (band), a Canadian punk band and side project of the band Nomeansno

== Companies ==
- Heidelberg Materials Australia, uilding materials company previously known as Hanson
- Heidelberg Materials UK, building materials company previously known as Hanson
- Hanson Records, a record label
- Hanson Robotics, a robotics company
- Hanson (automobile company), American automobile company that existed from 1917 to 1925

== Places ==
=== Australia ===
- Hanson, South Australia, a locality
- County of Hanson, a cadastral unit
- Hundred of Hanson, a cadastral unit

=== United States ===
- Hanson, Kentucky,
- Hanson, Massachusetts
  - Hanson (CDP), Massachusetts, a census-designated place in Hanson, Massachusetts
  - Hanson (MBTA station)
- Hanson, Oklahoma

== Other uses ==
- Hanson baronets, two baronetcies in the United Kingdom
- Hanson Brothers, fictional characters in the film Slap Shot
- Hanson Field, a stadium in Macomb, Illinois
- Hanson Formation, an Antarctica rock formation

== See also ==
- Hamson (surname)
- Hansen (disambiguation)
- Henson (disambiguation)
