= Crooked Creek Township, Bollinger County, Missouri =

Crooked Creek Township
- Township
- Coordinates: 37°25′10″N 090°03′36″W
- Country: United States
- State: Missouri
- County: Bollinger

Area
  - Total: 84.75 sq mi (219.49 km^{2})
  - Land: 84.67 sq mi (219.29 km^{2})
  - Water: 0.073 sq mi (0.19 km^{2}) 0.09%
- Elevation: 794 ft (242 m)

Population (2010)
  - Total: 1,234
  - Density: 60.7/sq mi (23.43/km^{2})
- FIPS code: 29-17380
- GNIS feature ID: 0766321

Crooked Creek Township is one of eight townships in Bollinger County, Missouri, USA. As of the 2000 U.S. census, its population was 1,182. As of the 2010 U.S. census, the population had increased to 1,234. Crooked Creek Township covers an area of 84.74 square miles (219.5 km^{2}).

Crooked Creek Township was established in 1872, and named after a creek of the same name noted for its irregular course.

== Demographics ==
As of the 2010 U.S. census, there were 1,234 people living in the township. The population density was 14.56 inhabitants per square mile (5.62/km^{2}). There were 631 housing units in the township. The racial makeup of the township was 97.49% White, 0.24% Black or African American, 1.70% Native American, 0.08% Asian, and 0.49% from two or more races. Approximately 0.49% of the population were Hispanic or Latino of any race.

== Geography ==
=== Incorporated areas ===
The township contains no incorporated settlements.

=== Unincorporated areas ===
The township contains the unincorporated areas and historical communities of Bessville, Grisham, Lodge, Shrum, and Tallent.

=== Cemeteries ===
The township contains the following nine cemeteries: Berry, Dalton, Hawn, Lincoln, McMahan, Moores, Old Concord, Slinkard, and Wallis.

=== Streams ===
The streams of Alex Branch, Big Blue Branch, Denton Creek, Hawn Creek, Henson Branch, Huffmans Creek, Indian Creek, Punch Creek, Reagan Branch, Shrum Branch, Stones Branch, Summers Creek, Turkey Creek and Turkey Creek flow through Crooked Creek Township.

=== Landmarks ===
- Amidon Memorial Conservation Area
- Hawn Access

== Administrative districts ==
=== School districts ===
- Meadow Heights R-II School District
- Woodland R-IV School District

=== Political Districts ===
- Missouri's 8th Congressional District
- State House District 145
- State Senate District 27
