= Scholastica =

Italian virgin and saint (c. 480 – 543)

Saint Scholastica
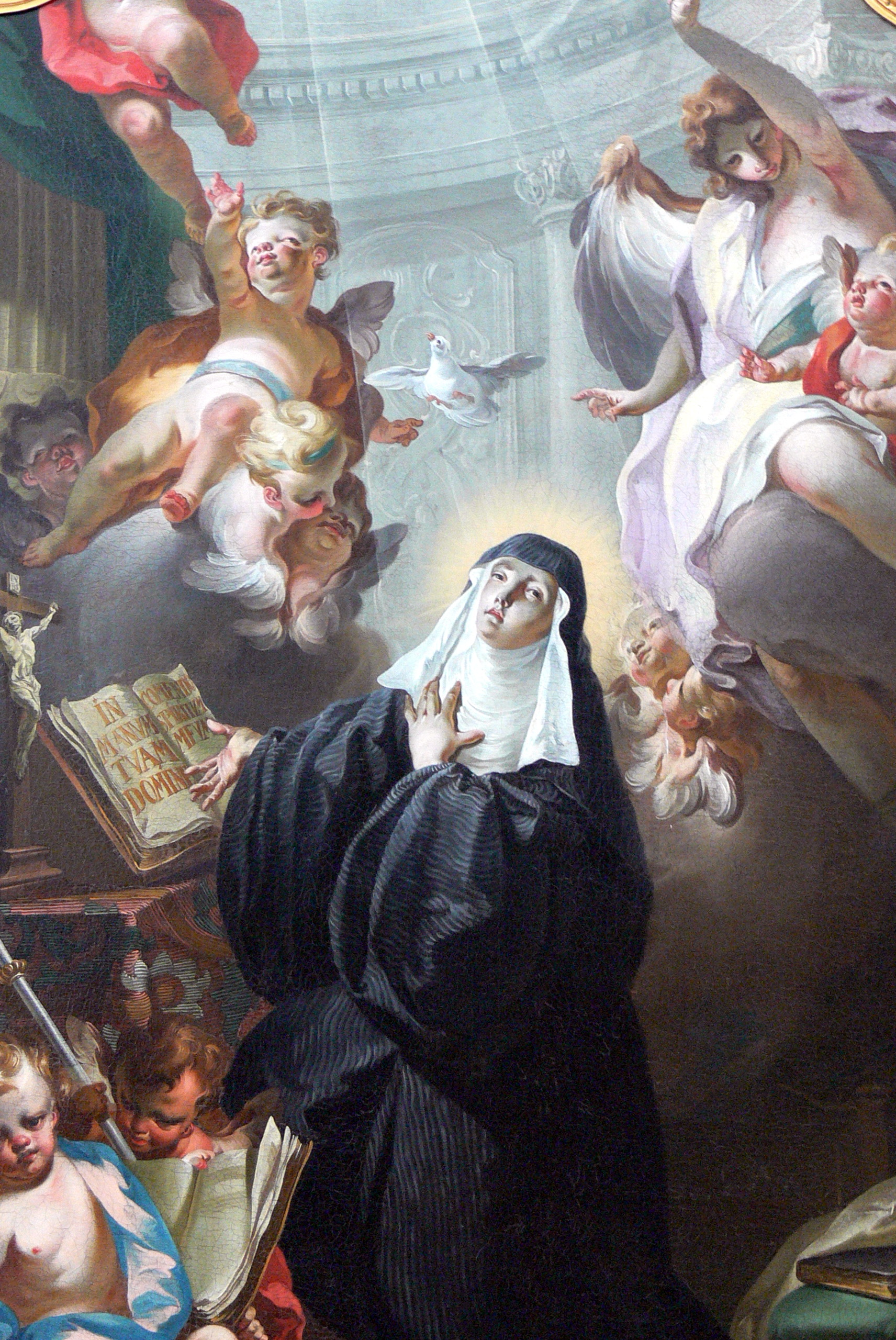
- Johann Baptist Wenzel Bergl, Death of Saint Scholastica, 1765

Virgin
- Born: c. 480; Nursia, Kingdom of Italy
- Died: 10 February 543 (aged 62–63) near Monte Cassino, Ostrogothic Kingdom
- Venerated in: Catholic Church; Eastern Orthodox Church; Anglican Communion
- Canonized: Pre-Congregation
- Feast: 10 February
- Attributes: in Benedictine religious habit, with crozier and crucifix; with dove flying from her mouth

Scholastica (/skəˈlæstɪkə/; c. 480 – 10 February 543) was an Italian Christian consecrated virgin and the sister of Benedict of Nursia. She is traditionally regarded as the foundress of the Benedictine nuns. Scholastica is honored as a saint of the Catholic Church, Eastern Orthodox Church and Anglican Communion. She was born in Italy, and a ninth-century tradition makes her the twin sister of Benedict. Her feast day is 10 February.

== Life ==
According to the 6th-century Dialogues of Gregory the Great, Scholastica was born c. 480 in Nursia, Umbria, of wealthy parents. While Gregory only states that Scholastica was Benedict's sister, a later tradition says she was his twin (whether this is meant biologically, spiritually, or both is unclear). Gregory also says she was dedicated to God from a young age. She and her brother Benedict were raised together until he left to pursue studies in Rome.

A young Roman woman of Scholastica's class and time would likely have remained in her father's house until marriage or entry into consecrated life. On occasion, several consecrated virgins would live together in a household and form a community.

Benedictine history shows that Scholastica established a hermitage about five miles from Monte Cassino and that this was the first convent of Benedictine nuns. However, it is possible that Scholastica lived in a hermitage with one or two other consecrated virgins in a cluster of houses at the base of Mount Cassino, where there is an ancient church under her patronage, Monastero di Santa Scolastica. Ruth Clifford Engs notes that since Dialogues indicates that Scholastica was dedicated to God at an early age, perhaps she lived in her father's house with other religious women until his death and then moved nearer to Benedict.

== Narrative from the Dialogues ==
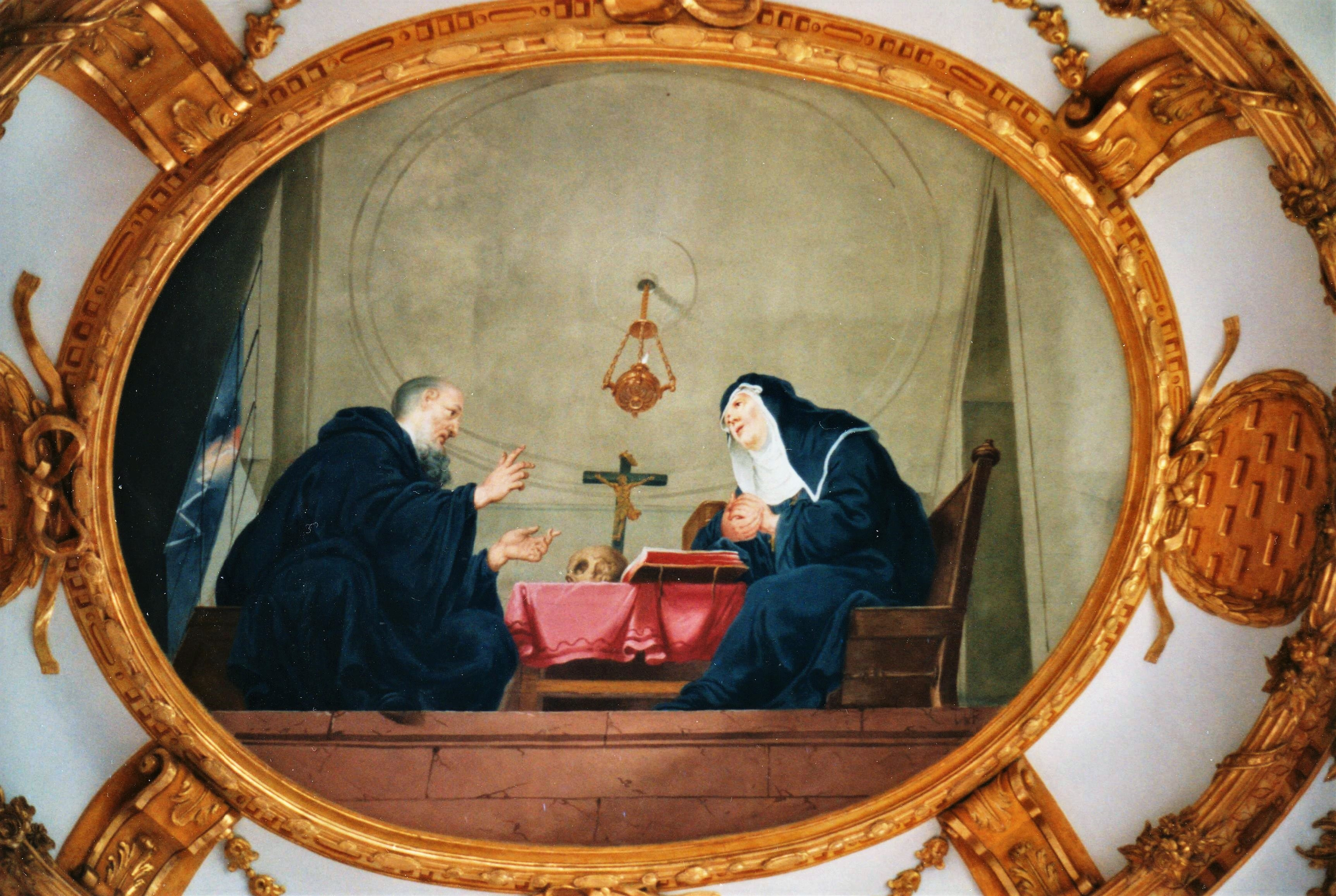
Saints Benedict and Scholastica in conversation, Klosterkirche Elchingen

The most commonly told story about her is that Scholastica would, once a year, visit her brother at a place near his abbey, and they would spend the day worshiping together and discussing sacred texts and other issues.

One day, they had supper and continued their conversation. When Benedict indicated it was time for him to leave, Scholastica, perhaps sensing that her death was drawing near, asked him to stay with her for the evening so they could continue their discussions. Not wishing to break his own Rule, Benedict refused, insisting that he needed to return to his cell. At that point, Scholastica closed her hands in prayer, and after a moment, a wild storm started outside the guest house in which they were staying. Benedict asked, "What have you done?", to which she replied, "I asked you, and you would not listen; so I asked my God, and he did listen. So now go off, if you can; leave me and return to your monastery." Benedict was unable to return to his monastery, and they spent the night in discussion.

Three days later, from his cell, he saw his sister's soul leaving the earth and ascending to heaven in the form of a shining white dove. Benedict had her body brought to his monastery, where he had it laid in the tomb which he had prepared for himself.

The Anglo-Saxon bishop and scholar Aldhelm recounts the story in both the De Laude Virginitatis, written for the nuns at Barking, and in the shorter Carmen de virginitate.

== Studies ==
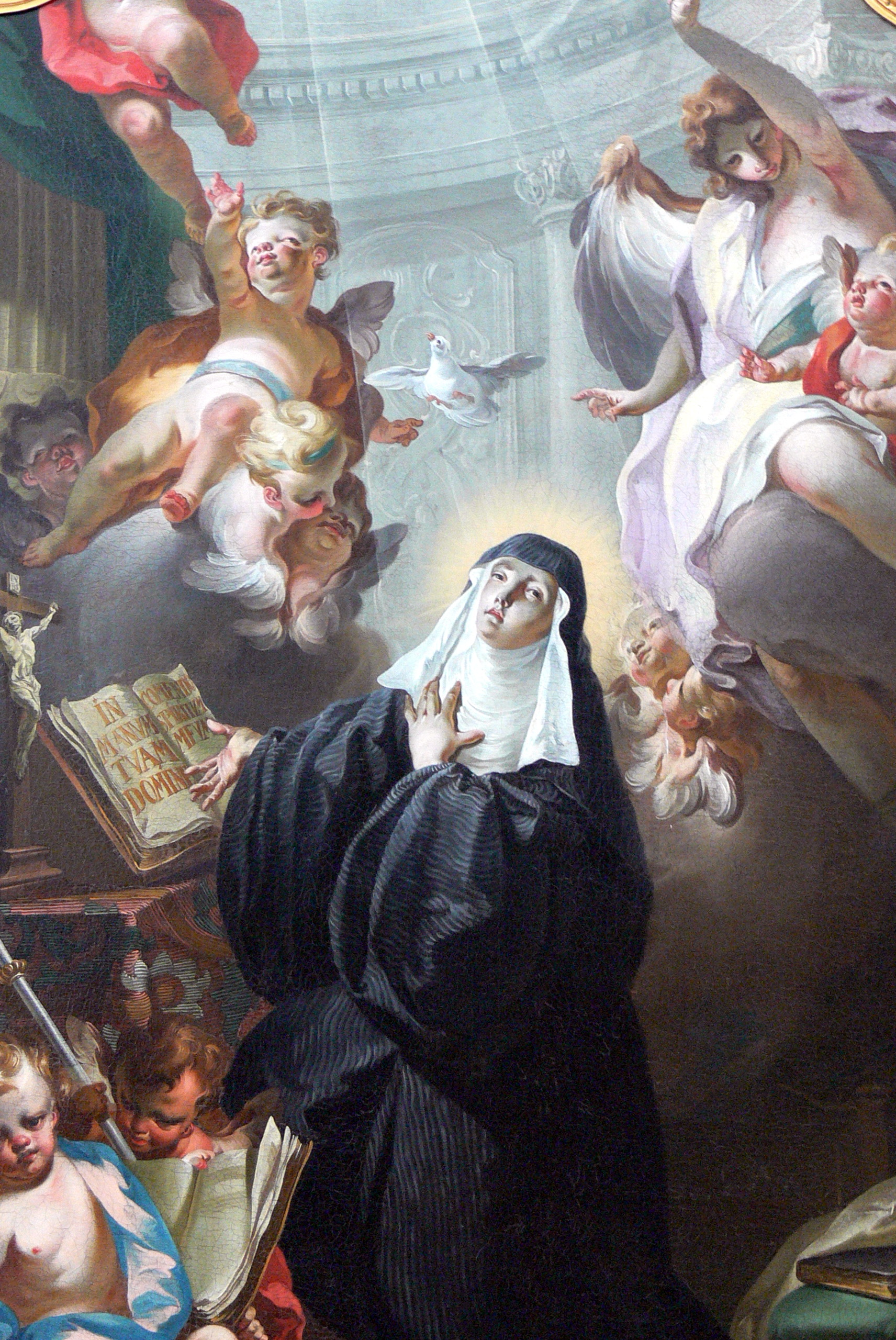
Hour of death of Saint Scholastica, altarpiece in the Basilica of Kleinmariazell

What is known about Scholastica comes from Gregory the Great's Dialogues. Early calendars and place names in the area around Monte Cassino support the historical accuracy of St. Gregory the Great's account of her life. Gregory names as his sources four of Benedict's contemporaries. A contemporary, Caesarius of Arles, wrote the Regula virginum (Rule for Virgins), a rule drawn up for virgins living in community, for a community which his sister, Caesaria, headed.

== Veneration ==
Scholastica is the patron saint of Benedictine nuns, education, and convulsive children, and is invoked against storms and rain. Her feast is celebrated on 10 February, and Saint Scholastica's Day bears special importance in the Benedictine monastic calendar. The Diocese of Aachen locally keeps a secondary feast of the translation of Scholastica's relics on 6 February, while Premonstratensians commemorate her on 9 February. Scholastica is also remembered in the Church of England and the Episcopal Church on 10 February.

In iconography, Scholastica is represented in a Benedictine habit, often as an abbess, and holding the Rule of Saint Benedict, with a crucifix or an ascending dove.

Scholastica was selected as the main motif for a high-value commemorative coin: the Austria €50 'The Christian Religious Orders', issued 13 March 2002. On the obverse (head) side, Scholastica is shown alongside her brother, Benedict.

== Gallery ==
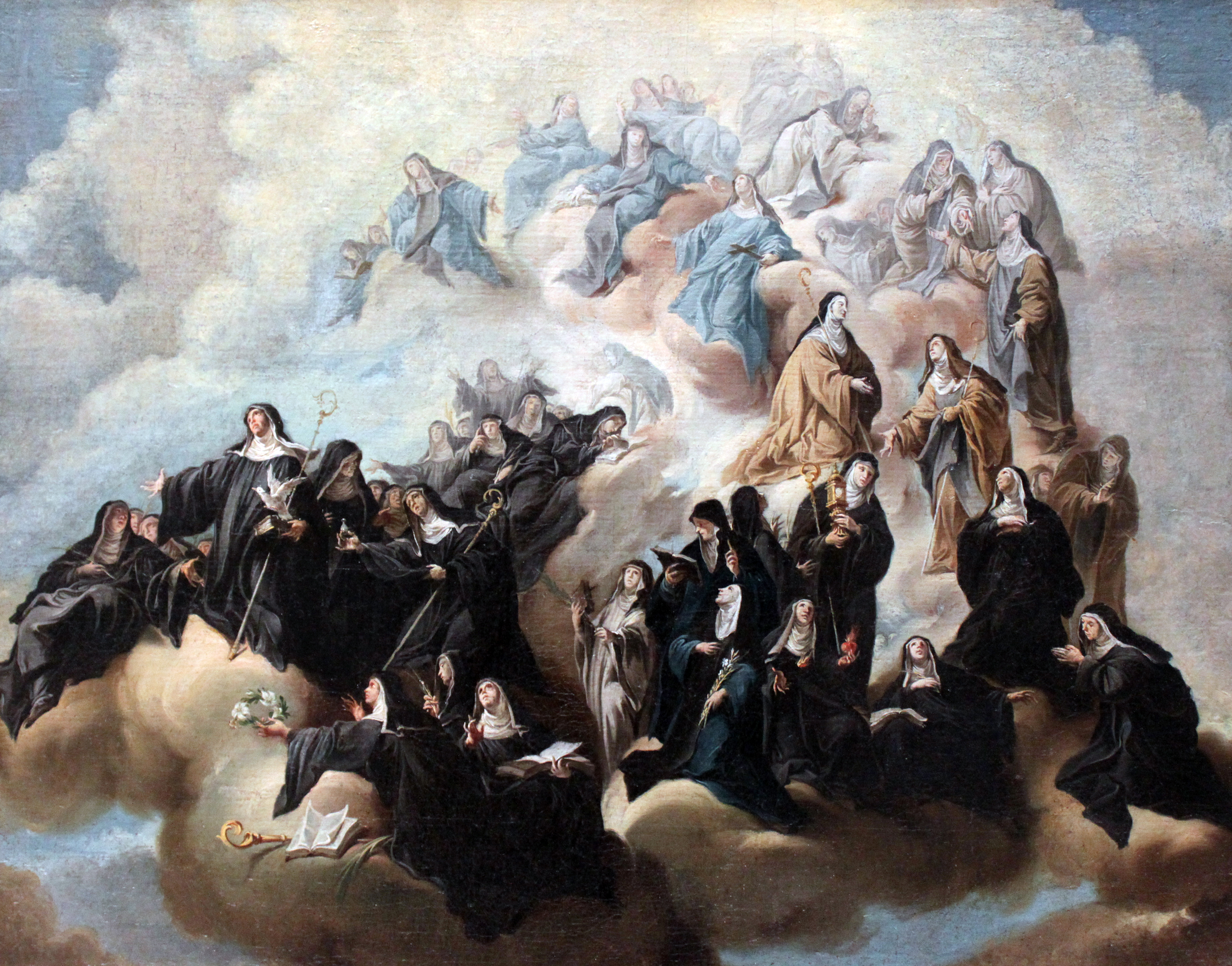
Saint Scholastica with Nuns of the Benedictine Order and its Affiliations

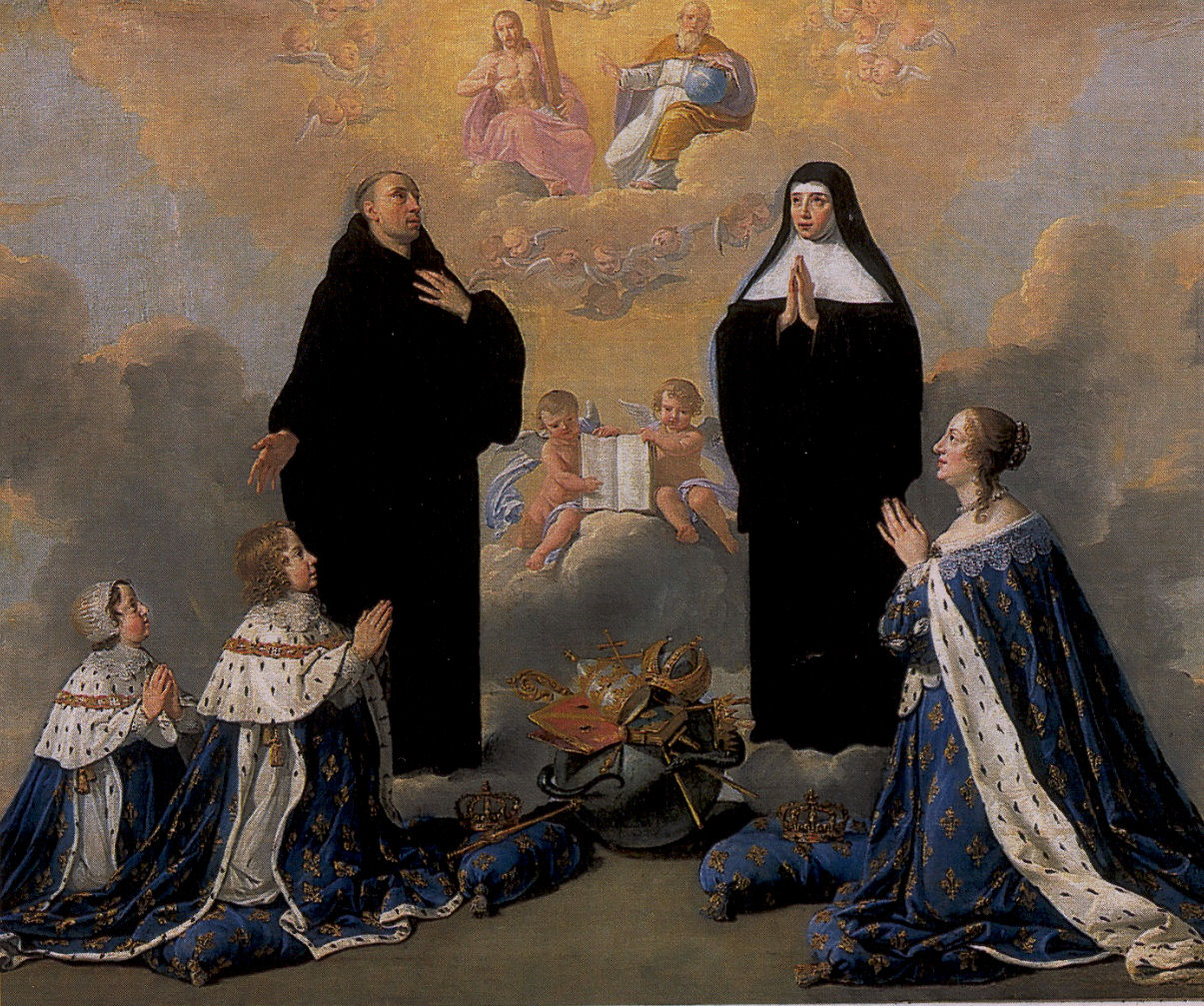
Anne of Austria with her children (King Louis XIV and Philippe, Duke of Anjou) praying to the Holy Trinity

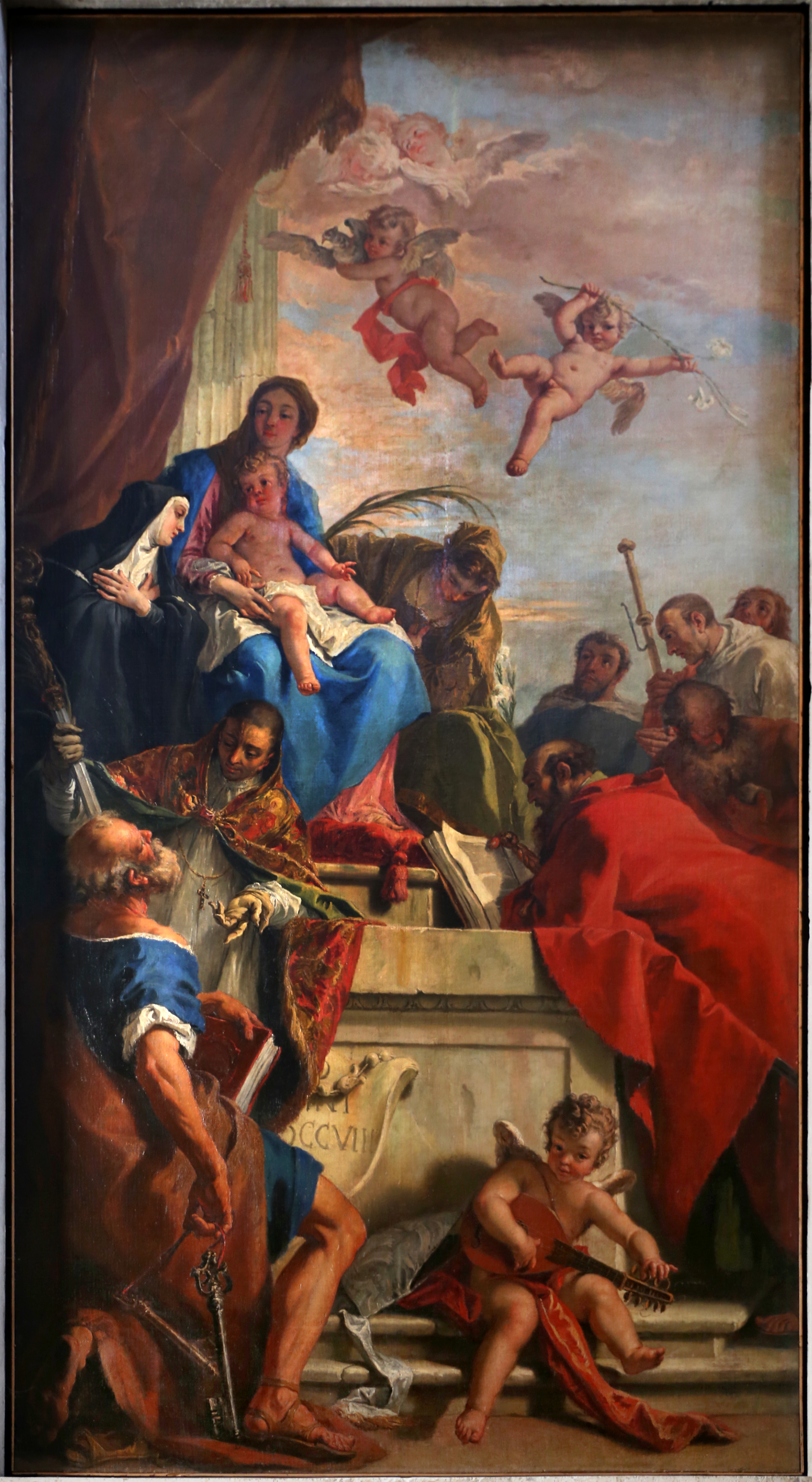
Madonna and Child with Saints

== See also ==
- List of Catholic saints
- St Scholastica Day riot
- Saint Scholastica, patron saint archive
