= Jacki Parry =

Australian artist (born 1941)

- Born: 26 June 1941 (age 85); Australia
- Education: Glasgow School of Art
- Known for: Artist, printmaker, lecturer, author, founding member of the Glasgow Print Studio

Jacki Parry RSA (born 26 June 1941) is an Australian born artist, printmaker, papermaker, former lecturer at the Glasgow School of Art and a founding member of the Glasgow Print Studio and the Paper Workshop, Glasgow.

== Education and early life ==
Parry was born in Australia and studied for a Trained Secondary Teachers Certificate (T.S.T.C.) in Sculpture in Melbourne from 1959 to 1961, followed by a Diploma of Art (Printmaking) at the Glasgow School of Art from 1970 to 1974. She gained a Post Diploma (Printed Textiles) at Glasgow School of Art in 1975.

== Teaching ==
Parry spent time from 1961 to 1970 teaching and travelling in Australia, Europe and Asia. She worked as a Studio Assistant in the Printmaking Department at the Glasgow School of Art from 1976 to 1981, then at the same institution she worked as a lecturer in papermaking in 1981, was a lecturer on the MA Design course from 1981 to 1985, lectured in the Sculpture Department from 1985 to 1991, was senior lecturer in Fine Art: Head of Printmaking from 1991 to 2001 and subsequently taught in the Department of Fine Art from 2001 to 2006.

== Career ==
Parry is recognised for her work around paper, both using it as a medium on which to print and as a material in its own right:

"For most of the last forty years my investigations have been based on developing ideas in paper using it variously as substrate, as independent medium, and in combination with other materials. My work draws on two areas of subject-matter which separately and together continue to sustain me : a response on the one hand to changes in landscape and the elements, and on the other to information, its containment and manipulation."

Parry moved to live and work in Scotland in 1965. She was one of eight founding members who set up Glasgow Print Studio in 1972, while she was a student at Glasgow School of Art. In 1985 she set up the Paper Workshop in Glasgow. She studied papermaking in Barcelona with Laurence Barker and in Shiroishi, Japan, with Tadao Endo. Parry is Member of the Royal Scottish Academy. In 1984, Parry appeared in the BBC Scotland film 'The Lunch Party' (directed by Eleanor Aitken), in conversation with Liz Lochhead and Lys Hansen.

Her work has been described by the New Hall Art Collection, a permanent collection of contemporary art by women artists, as responding "to changes in landscape and the elements and to information, its containment and manipulation".

Her 1988 exhibition, Daly River Night, was shown at the Third Eye Centre, Glasgow until April 23 that year. The exhibition took its name from Parry returning to Australia and making an expedition to the North-West Territory along the Daly River. Cordelia Oliver writing in the Guardian recorded that the exhibition reflected both the "rare moisture in a desiccated landscape" and that the "poetic quality that pervades the gallery is inescapably tinged with disquiet. Nature in the raw, Jacki Parry seems to be saying, is both beautiful and fearful."

To celebrate its anniversary in 2012, the Glasgow Women's Library asked 21 artists and 21 writers to create work in response to its collection. The art, by Sam Ainsley, Clare Barclay, Lucy Skaer, Karla Black, Jacki Parry and others was exhibited at Intermedia in Glasgow and the RSA in Edinburgh while the writing by A L Kennedy, Janice Galloway, Muriel Gray, Denise Mina and Jackie Kay and others featured in a coffee-table book. Parry's contribution to celebrate the anniversary was to recreate a street map of Glasgow, naming the streets after the women featured on the library's heritage walking tour.

== Selected collections ==
Parry's work is represented in the collections of the following institutions:

- The Scottish National Gallery of Modern Art, Edinburgh
- The Hunterian, The University of Glasgow
- The British Council, London
- Glasgow Print Studio
- The National Gallery of Art, Washington D.C (Paper Conservation Collection)

== Selected exhibitions ==
- 'Works 1976-85' at Lillie Gallery, Milngavie, 1985
- 'Daly River Night: Images of north-western Australia. Paperworks and Prints' at Third Eye Centre (and tour), 1988
- 'Ways of Editing', at the Lillie Art Gallery, Milngavie, 1998.
- Part of '21 Revolutions' project at Glasgow Women's Library, 2012
- 'Jacki Parry: Resonance - Gathering and Sampling' at Dovecot Studios, 2013

== Publications ==
- 'Etching and other intaglio technique'. Scottish Arts Council, 1983
- 'Daly River Night : images of North Western Australia, paperworks and prints'.Third Eye Centre, 1988
- 'Jacki Parry : ways of editing : works in handmade paper'. The Paper Workshop, 1999
- in '21 Revolutions: new writing and prints inspired by the collection at Glasgow Women's Library'. Glasgow Women's Library, 2014.
