= Shrum, Missouri =

Unincorporated community in Missouri, U.S.

- unincorporated community
- Location of Bollinger County, Missouri
- Coordinates: 37°23′02″N 90°00′54″W
- Country: United States
- State: Missouri
- County: Bollinger
- Township: Crooked Creek
- Elevation: 587 ft (179 m)
- Time zone: UTC-6 (Central (CST))
  - Summer (DST): UTC-5 (CDT)
- Area code: 573
- GNIS feature ID: 752143

Shrum is an unincorporated community in the southeastern part of Crooked Creek Township in Bollinger County, Missouri, United States. Shrum, which lies 5 1/2 miles east of Bessville, was established in 1900, and the community was named for a local landowner, Nicholas Shrum. The community's post office was in operation between the years of 1898–1937.
