= Hurricane, Bollinger County, Missouri =

Hurricane, Missouri
- Unincorporated community
- Location of Bollinger County, Missouri
- Coordinates: 37°24′58″N 90°00′50″W
- Country: United States
- State: Missouri
- County: Bollinger
- Township: Crooked Creek
- Time zone: UTC-6 (Central (CST))
  - Summer (DST): UTC-5 (CDT)
- Area code: 573

Hurricane is an unincorporated community in the eastern part of Crooked Creek Township in Bollinger County, Missouri, United States. The community is located near Hurricane Creek, a nearby stream. after which it was named. The name derives from the creek's unusual swiftness and violence after heavy rains, which makes passage across the creek impossible or dangerous. The violence of this swiftness and speed is likened to a storm or hurricane. A post office was in operation between the years 1894–1942.
