= Charles Hansen =

Chuck, Charlie or Charles Hansen may refer to:

- Charles Hansen (cyclist) (1891–after 1912), Danish team participant in 1912 Olympics
- Charles Robert Hansen (1909–2000), American mayor and state senator in Minnesota
- Charles Henry Hansen (1913–1995), American music publisher, founder in 1952 of Chas. H. Hansen Music Corp.
- Charlie Hansen, American football player on 1958 List of Tulane Green Wave in the NFL draft
- Charles M. Hansen (born 1938), American-Danish chemical engineer and deviser of Hansen Solubility Parameters
- Chuck Hansen (1947–2003), American historian and collector of atomic weapons documents
- Charles D. Hansen, American computer scientist and writer since 1980s

== See also ==
- Charles Hanson (disambiguation)
- Hansen (surname)
