= Anne Sheehan =

Seismologist

Anne F. Sheehan
- Education: Massachusetts Institute of Technology
- Scientific career
- Workplaces: University of Colorado Boulder
- Thesis: Lateral variation in upper mantle temperature and composition beneath mid-ocean ridges inferred from shear-wave propagation, geoid, and bathymetry (1991)

Anne Sheehan is a geologist known for her research using seismometer data to examine changes in the Earth's crust and mantle.

== Education and career ==
Sheehan has a B.S. from the University of Kansas (1984) and earned her Ph.D. from Massachusetts Institute of Technology in 1991. Following her Ph.D., she was a postdoc at Lamont–Doherty Earth Observatory and the University of Nevada, Reno. In 1993 she moved to the University of Colorado Boulder, where she was promoted to professor in 2006.

In 2014 Sheehan was elected a fellow of the American Geophysical Union who cited her "for developing methods to image the Earth using seismometer arrays, to explain deformation processes of mountains, oceanic, and continental plates."

== Research ==
Sheehan's research centers on the Earth's crust and mantle with a focus on formation of the lithosphere and the impact of Induced seismicity. She uses field data collected from seismic instruments deployed in a variety of locations including oceanic lithosphere near the Bermuda Rise and the East Pacific Rise, the subduction zone near New Zealand, and the Sierra Nevada mountain range in California. Her research on the impact of induced seismicity describes the process by which earthquakes occur following fluid injection. While Sheehan was working with ocean-bottom seismometers in New Zealand she realized that small waves detected by the instruments could be expanded to outfit cargo ships with instrumentation to detecting tsunamis. This research would benefit coastal communities in the path of tsunamis formed after earthquakes at the seafloor.

=== Selected publications ===
- Sheehan, Anne F.; Abers, Geoffrey A.; Jones, Craig H.; Lerner-Lam, Arthur L. (1995). "Crustal thickness variations across the Colorado Rocky Mountains from teleseismic receiver functions". Journal of Geophysical Research: Solid Earth. 100 (B10): 20391–20404. Bibcode:1995JGR...10020391S. doi:10.1029/95JB01966. ISSN 2156-2202.
- Dueker, Kenneth G.; Sheehan, Anne F. (1997). "Mantle discontinuity structure from midpoint stacks of converted P to S waves across the Yellowstone hotspot track". Journal of Geophysical Research: Solid Earth. 102 (B4): 8313–8327. Bibcode:1997JGR...102.8313D. doi:10.1029/96JB03857. ISSN 2156-2202. S2CID 140704480.
- Burger, Henry Robert; Sheehan, Anne F.; Jones, Craig H. (2006). Introduction to applied geophysics: Exploring the shallow subsurface. New York, N.Y.: W. W. Norton & Company. ISBN 978-0-393-92637-8.
- Warren-Smith, E.; Fry, B.; Wallace, L.; Chon, E.; Henrys, S.; Sheehan, A.; Mochizuki, K.; Schwartz, S.; Webb, S.; Lebedev, S. (June 2019). "Episodic stress and fluid pressure cycling in subducting oceanic crust during slow slip". Nature Geoscience. 12 (6): 475–481. Bibcode:2019NatGe..12..475W. doi:10.1038/s41561-019-0367-x. ISSN 1752-0908. S2CID 182644542.
- Wallace, L. M.; Webb, S. C.; Ito, Y.; Mochizuki, K.; Hino, R.; Henrys, S.; Schwartz, S. Y.; Sheehan, A. F. (6 May 2016). "Slow slip near the trench at the Hikurangi subduction zone, New Zealand". Science. 352 (6286): 701–704. Bibcode:2016Sci...352..701W. doi:10.1126/science.aaf2349. PMID 27151867. S2CID 206647253.

== Awards and honors ==
- Fellow, American Geophysical Union (2014)
- EarthScope Distinguished Lecturer (2013)
- New Zealand Geophysics Prize, Geoscience Society of New Zealand for papers in 2016 and 2019
