= Max Hansen =

Max Hansen may refer to:

- Max Hansen (tenor) (1897–1961), Danish singer, actor, and comedian
- Max Hansen (Haven) played by John Bourgeois, a character on the supernatural TV series Haven
- Max Hanson, a character from Trapped in a Purple Haze

== See also ==
- Hansen (disambiguation)
- Max (disambiguation)
