= David Hansen =

Dave or David Hansen may refer to:

- David Hansen (playwright) (born 1968), American actor, director and playwright
- Dave Hansen (politician) (born 1947), state senator from Wisconsin
- Dave Hansen (baseball) (born 1968), former Major League Baseball third baseman
- David Hansen (Norwegian politician) (born 1978), Norwegian politician for the Christian Democratic Party
- David R. Hansen (born 1938), U.S. federal judge
- David Animle Hansen (1923–2008), first Ghanaian to be Chief of Naval Staff of the Ghana Navy
- David Hansen (countertenor) (born 1981), Australian operatic countertenor
- David Hansen (art historian) (1958–2024), Australian art historian
- David Hansen (academic), Columbia University professor and John Dewey scholar

== See also ==
- David Hanssen (born 1976), Norwegian footballer
- David Hanson (disambiguation)
