= 1916 Bodmin by-election =

UK Parliamentary by-election

The 1916 Bodmin by-election was held on 15 August 1916. The by-election was held due to the resignation of the incumbent Liberal Unionist MP, Sir Reginald Pole-Carew. It was won by the Conservative candidate Charles Hanson who was unopposed due to a War-time electoral pact.
