= Robert Hansen (disambiguation) =

Robert Hansen (1939–2013) was an American serial killer.

Robert Hansen may also refer to:

- Robert Hansen (actor) (born 1979), Danish actor
- Robert B. Hansen (1925–2005), Attorney General of Utah
- Robert Emil Hansen (1860–1926), Danish composer and cellist
- Robert W. Hansen (1911–1997), American jurist from Wisconsin
- Robert Hansen Jr. (born 2004), Australian rules footballer
- Robert Hanssen (1944–2023) FBI, spy
- Bob Hansen (born 1961), American basketball player
- Bob Hansen (baseball) (born 1948), Major League Baseball first baseman

== See also ==
- Robert Hanssen (1944–2023), FBI agent and KGB spy
- Bob Hansson (born 1970), Swedish poet and author
- Robert Hanson (disambiguation)
