= Robert Hanson =

Robert Hanson may refer to:

== Arts and entertainment ==
- Robert Hanson (director) (born 1946), director of the Elgin Symphony Orchestra and composer
- Robert Hanson, a character in the 2002 film Abandon
- Bob Hanson, character in the 2010 film Legion

== Government and military ==
- Robert Hanson (United States Army Air Forces) (1920–2005), American Army pilot
- Robert E. Hanson (1947–2015), North Dakota politician
- Robert M. Hanson (1920–1944), United States Marine Corps aviator

== Sports ==
- Bob Hanson (American football), see List of Montana Grizzlies in the NFL draft
- Bob Hanson (basketball), see List of presidents of the National Association of Basketball Coaches

== Other ==
- Robert Hanson (priest) (1866–1947), Anglican chaplain
- Robert Hanson (financier) (born 1960), British financier and businessman

== See also ==
- Robert Hanssen (1944–2023), FBI agent and KGB spy
- Robert Hansen (1939–2014), American serial killer
- Robert Hansen (disambiguation)
