= Ruth C. Engs =

American academic writer

Ruth Clifford Engs
- Born: Ruth Louise Clifford; Pennsylvania

Academic background
- Education: University of Vermont; University of Oregon; University of Tennessee
- Thesis: The personality traits and health knowledge of crisis intervention volunteers in the State of Tennessee (1973)

Academic work
- Discipline: Applied health educator
- Institutions: Dalhousie University; Indiana University Bloomington

Ruth Clifford Engs is an American academic writer who is Professor Emeritus, Applied Health Science, Indiana University, Bloomington, Indiana. Since the mid-1990s she has been engaged in research on social movements related to health and public health issues with a focus on the Progressive Era.

== Early life and education ==
Although born in Pennsylvania, Engs spent her formative years in the small town of Bethel, Vermont. She went through the local schools until her junior year in high school when she went to Cushing Academy, Ashburnham, Massachusetts Upon graduation in 1957, she entered the University of Vermont and graduated in 1961 with a B.A. in Liberal Arts (chemistry major and minors in biology and English literature).

== Early career ==
After college graduation she worked as the laboratory assistant in the Bacteriology Department of Harvard Medical School for two years. Deciding she did not like "bench research" and having wanderlust, in the fall of 1963 she traveled to Australia on a freighter and returned a year later to San Francisco. She had noticed on her travels that registered nurses were able to get jobs anywhere, so she entered a two-year nursing program. In the mid-1960s she married her first husband, Bill Engs, whom she had met on a backpacking trip.

After living in the Bay Area for five years, she went to Eugene, Oregon, for graduate work. Although she liked nursing she found she liked teaching better. At the University of Oregon she completed two master's degrees: counseling psychology and health education. After graduation and a divorce, she taught health education and nursing courses at Dalhousie University, Halifax, Nova Scotia for a year. While there with the help of medical and nursing students, she organized the "Med-Aid Station," a street clinic, for the many youth who were coming to Canada during this era. Realizing the need for a doctorate, she went to, and graduated from, the University of Tennessee. For her dissertation she studied the "Personality traits and the health knowledge of telephone crisis intervention volunteers in the state of Tennessee."

When she graduated from Tennessee, she started working as an assistant professor in the Department of Applied Health Science, Indiana University. She was tenured and promoted to associate and then full professor. She retired from teaching in 2003. During most of her first twenty years, Professor Engs explored factors for the determinants of behavior focusing upon university student drinking. This focus on alcohol originated from an invitation by the Dean of Student's Office to develop an alcohol education program. She and her committee organized and produced the film Booz and Yous (1975) and ten years later Drinking and Thinking. She also designed and tested the Student Alcohol Questionnaire that is now used by hundreds of students and researchers each year around the world.

During her first 20 years she published numerous papers on various aspects of college student drinking practices in the United States and many other countries. Her co-author for many was David J. Hanson, SUNY, Potsdam. She also published several textbooks including Responsible Drug and Alcohol Use (1979), Alcohol and Other Drugs: Self Responsibility (1987), and with Molly Wantz Teaching Health Education in the Elementary School (1978). She was editor for Controversies in the Addiction Field (1990) and Women: Alcohol and Other Drugs (1989). During the 1980s and early 1990s she was active on the board of directors of several national organization.

== Later career ==
By the early-1990s Engs' research on the determinants of drinking and health behaviors led to a different vein of research. Taking a more global look, she investigated the origins of drinking attitude and behaviors from antiquity. The resulting article was featured in Archeology (October 1997). In the United States she discovered that anti-alcohol and pro-health campaigns with moral undertones had come in cycles. This led to Clean Lean Living Movement: American Cycles of Health Reform (2000) which was featured in the New York Times Science Book Section. Her next book was The Progressive Era Health Reform Movement: A Historical Dictionary (2003), followed by The Eugenics Movement: An Encyclopedia (2005), and in the fall of 2007 Conversations in the Abbey. Currently she is working on a biography of Upton Sinclair as a health reformer.

Engs was awarded the School of HPER (now School of Public Health-Bloomington), Indiana University Outstanding Researcher Award in 2002 and the Robert Kirk Distinguished Alumni Award from the University of Tennessee's Department of Health Education, 1997.

== Personal life ==
She is an instrument rated pilot and met her husband, Jeffrey Franz, through flying in the late 1980s. They now spend a lot of time working on and driving a Model A Ford.

== Publications ==
- Women: Alcohol and Other Drugs (Editor), 1989, 2006.
- Controversies in the Addiction Field (Editor), 1990.
- Clean Living Movements: American Cycles of Health Reform (2000, 2001)
- The Progressive Era's Health Reform Movement: A Historical Dictionary (2003)
- The Eugenics Movement: an Encyclopedia (2005)
- Conversations in the Abbey: Senior Monks of Saint Meinrad Reflect on their Lives (2008)
- Unseen Upton Sinclair: Nine Unpublished Short Stories, Essays, and Other Works (Editor), 2009.
- The Field Hospital that never was: Diary of Lt. Col. Karl D. Macmillan's, MD, 96th Field Hospital in China-India-Burma Theater 1945, WWII (Editor/Compiler), 2015.

== Sources ==
- Engs, Ruth C. "Highlights of Curricula Vitae".
- Who's Who in the World 19th edition. New Providence, NJ: Marquis Who's Who, 2002.
- The Writers Directory. 22nd edition. Detroit: St. James Press, 2006.
