= Troy-class boats =

Troy class boats are a class of sailing boats unique to Fowey in Cornwall and are raced competitively.

== History ==
In the winter of 1928/29, the first boat was built by Archie Watty, for Sir Charles Hanson (a former Lord Mayor of London).

The name comes from Troy town which is the fictional name given to Fowey by the writer and scholar Sir Arthur Quiller-Couch in many of his books.

Since 1929, a total of 29 boats have been built. Seven new boats have been built in the last ten years, five of them by Marcus Lewis, boatbuilder in Fowey.

The Troy class has been dominated over the years by Alan Toms, so wins by other competitors have been well received by the Fowey sailing community.
