= Sturgis Leavitt =

American academic and educator

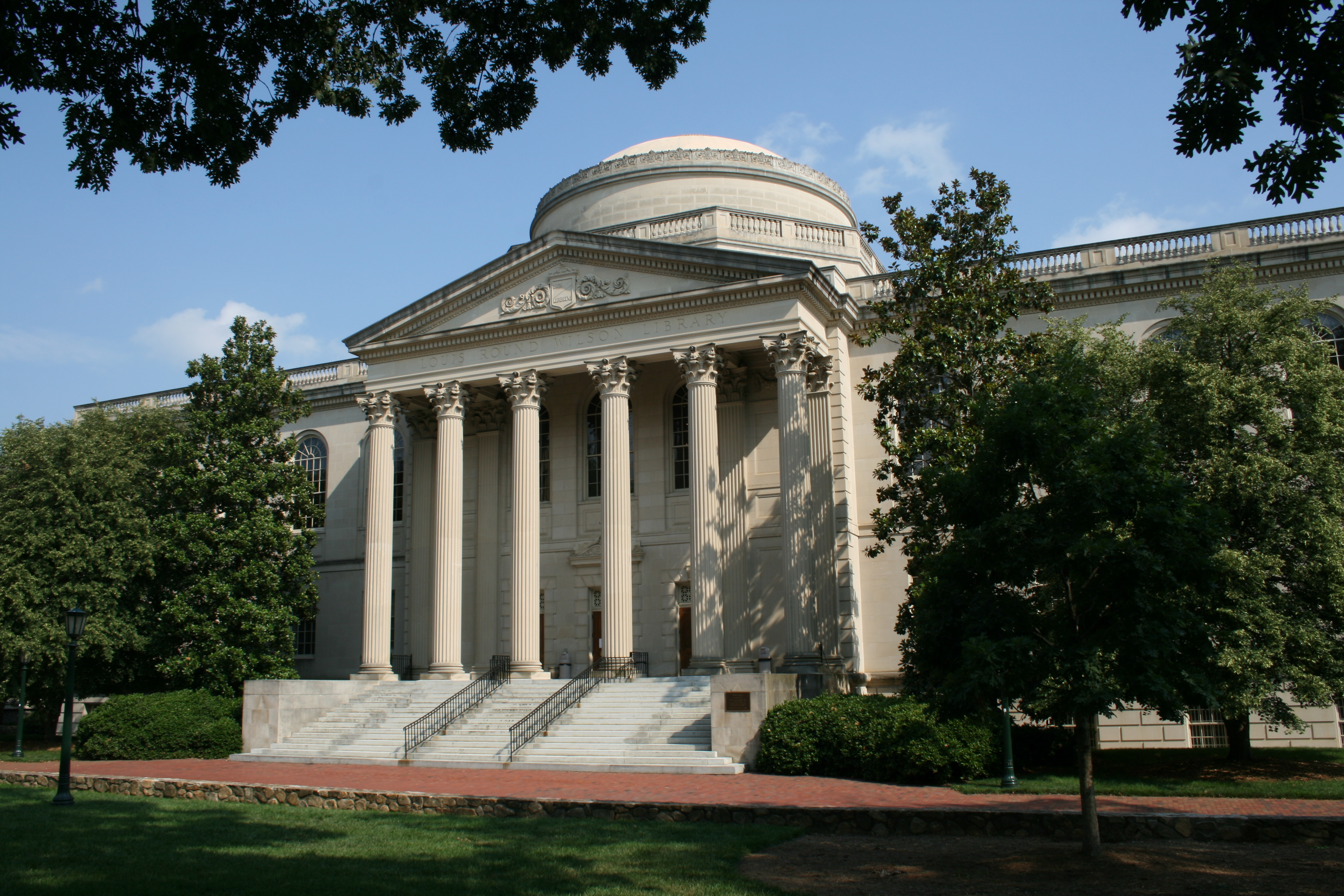
Wilson Library, University of North Carolina, Chapel Hill. Wilson Library, and others like it, helped Prof. Sturgis Leavitt and other scholars build the South's educational resources.

Sturgis Elleno Leavitt (1888–1976) was the Kenan Professor of Spanish at the University of North Carolina, the author of many books on Spanish language and literature, the president of several Spanish language teaching organizations, an adviser to the U.S. State Department and for many years the chairman of the Southern Humanities Conference as well as editor of the Hispanic Review.

== Early years ==
Sturgis Leavitt was born on January 24, 1888, in Newhall, Maine, the son of William H. Leavitt and his wife Mary Ellen (Sturgis). After attending high school in nearby Gorham, Maine, Leavitt was educated at Bowdoin College, Brunswick, Maine, and then at Harvard University, where he graduated with a Ph.D. in 1917.

== Career ==
Between stints at Harvard Graduate School, Leavitt taught at Jackson Military Academy in Missouri, Cushing Academy in Massachusetts, Northwestern University and at Harvard College.

Following his graduation from Harvard, where he was awarded the Sheldon Traveling Fellowship, Leavitt embarked on a trip to South America. For the next two years, he traveled between Peru, Bolivia, Chile, Argentina and Uruguay. Following his tour of South America, Leavitt returned to America, where he was offered a junior teaching job at the University of North Carolina at Chapel Hill in 1917. Following his Harvard graduation, Leavitt eventually became a full professor and later Kenan Professor of Spanish.

The Maine native's early days in the South as a professor of Spanish studies were not without trials. "In 1930 Southern colleges and universities lagged far behind the great Northern and (some) Western universities", writes professor Clifford Lyons of UNC Chapel Hill. "We had few distinguished scholars and most of them did not have access to a first-class university library." Eventually, because of the efforts of Leavitt and scholars like him, the universities and colleges of the south were able to build modern language departments of stature. "All that has changed, and I think SAMLA had a lot to do with it", writes Lyons. (In the part of the twentieth century, other notable Southern scholars in other fields also fled northward, including Yale University's Cleanth Brooks, a native of Kentucky, and Robert Penn Warren, writer, Yale professor and fellow Kentucky native.)

In 1935 the young Spanish professor and Maine native helped found and became editor of The South Atlantic Bulletin, a publication addressed to the Southern Hemisphere of North America. The first issue appeared in May 1935 in broadside format, approximately 11x16 inches. The inaugural issue carried a statement of purpose which made clear that the bulletin would examine all aspects of the field, including the treatment of those teaching in it:

"It [the Bulletin] should publish, for example, descriptions of important collections in the libraries of the Southeast, and reviews and notices of scholarly publications by our members", Leavitt wrote. "It should also make known the results of investigations regarding the attitudes of school authorities toward research, sabbatical leaves, and related problems." Leavitt proposed to charge $1 for annual dues – a figure that held for the next 20 years (until 1955). Leavitt remained the Bulletin's editor until 1950, and managed to publish an issue on time each out of readers' annual dues.

In 1956 Leavitt was elected to the board of the national Modern Language Association, on which he served three years. He later served as Director of Inter-America Institute, a school for large groups of teachers and students from Latin American countries. Leavitt served as president of the AATSP from 1945 to 1946, and as member of the editor's advisory council for Hispania magazine for many years. The bibliography that Leavitt maintained of Hispanic literature has been called one of his notable contributions to the field of Spanish language studies.

== Awards ==
Sturgis Leavitt was awarded honorary degrees of Doctor of Letters by Davidson College and by his alma mater Bowdoin.

In 1974, he was made a member of the Mexican Academy. The same year he was also installed as one of the first members of the Academy of Spanish Language in the United States. In 1972 he had been named one of the nation's top ten Spanish language scholars by the Madrid literary journal La Estafeta Literaria.

The Sturgis Elleno Leavitt Award of the Southeastern Council of Latin American Studies, with which Leavitt was long associated, is named for him.

Professor Leavitt's papers are deposited at the Manuscripts Department of the Library of the University of North Carolina at Chapel Hill.

== Personal life ==
The Maine native was a longtime member of the Mayflower Society. Leavitt and his wife, the former Alga Webber, long lived at 718 East Franklin Street in Chapel Hill, North Carolina, where they built a New England–style white clapboard home.

Leavitt died on March 3, 1976, aged 88, at North Carolina Memorial Hospital; his wife Alga had died a decade earlier. Leavitt's teaching career at UNC spanned 43 years (1917–60), and until his death he worked each day at his desk in the university's Dey Hall, center of the language programs he helped nurture.

Leavitt's wife was an editor and writer who was the author of Stories and Poems from the Old South: Edited by Mrs. Sturgis Elleno Leavitt (Alga Leavitt) published by the Seeman Printery at Durham, North Carolina in 1923. An amateur actress, Alga Leavitt had earlier worked with author Thomas Wolfe at the Carolina Playmakers, an amateur theatrical group.
