= Fred Woodcock =

American baseball player (1868–1943)

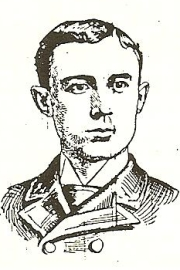
- Pitcher
- Born: May 17, 1868; Winchendon, Massachusetts, U.S.
- Died: August 11, 1943 (aged 75); Ashburnham, Massachusetts, U.S.
- Batted: Left Threw: Left

MLB debut
- May 17, 1892, for the Pittsburgh Pirates

Last MLB appearance
- June 17, 1892, for the Pittsburgh Pirates

MLB statistics
- Win–loss record: 1-2
- Earned run average: 3.55
- Strikeouts: 8
- Stats at Baseball Reference

Teams
- Pittsburgh Pirates (1892)

Fred Wayland Woodcock (May 17, 1868 – August 11, 1943) was an American professional baseball pitcher. He attended Cushing Academy in Ashburnham, Massachusetts. He appeared in five games in Major League Baseball for the 1892 Pittsburgh Pirates of the National League. He played college ball at Brown University and Dartmouth College. After his one season in the majors, he played in 1893 in the New England League and in 1895 in the Texas-Southern League.
