= David Hanson =

David Hanson or Dave Hanson may refer to:

== Politicians ==
- David Hanson, Baron Hanson of Flint (born 1957), British politician and life peer, MP for Delyn
- Dave Hanson (politician) (born 1960/1961), Canadian politician, MLA for Lac La Biche-St. Paul-Two Hills, Alberta

== Sportspeople ==
- Dave Hanson (footballer) (born 1968), former football striker
- David Hanson (ice hockey) (born 1954), ice hockey player, most famous for his role in Slap Shot

== Others ==
- David Hanson (computer scientist), American software engineer
- David T. Hanson (born 1948), environmental photographer
- David Hanson (producer), British television producer
- David Hanson (robotics designer) (born 1969), American sculptor and robotics researcher
- David J. Hanson (born 1941), American sociologist
- David Hanson, guitarist with progressive rock band GoodThunder
- David Lee Hanson (D. L. Hanson; 1935-2020), American statistician, see Hanson-Wright inequality

== See also ==
- David Heinemeier Hansson (born 1979), Danish programmer
- David Hansen (disambiguation)
