= Hanson baronets of Fowey (1918) =

Escutcheon of the Hanson baronets of Fowey

The Hanson baronetcy, of Fowey in the County of Cornwall, was created in the Baronetage of the United Kingdom on 6 July 1918 for Charles Hanson, Lord Mayor of London for 1917/8. He was Member of Parliament for Bodmin from 1916 to 1922.

== Hanson baronets of Fowey (1918) ==
- Sir Charles Augustin Hanson, 1st Baronet (1846–1922)
- Sir Charles Hanson, 2nd Baronet (1874–1958). The son of the 1st Baronet, he was Lord Lieutenant of the City of London in 1910 and High Sheriff of Cornwall in 1936.
- Sir (Charles) John Hanson, 3rd Baronet (1919–1996)
- Sir (Charles) Rupert Patrick Hanson, 4th Baronet (born 1945)

The heir apparent is the present holder's son Alexis Charles Hanson (born 1978).
