= List of Montana Grizzlies in the NFL draft =

This is a list of Montana Grizzlies football players in the NFL draft.

== Key ==
B	Back	K	Kicker	NT	Nose tackle
C	Center	LB	Linebacker	FB	Fullback
DB	Defensive back	P	Punter	HB	Halfback
DE	Defensive end	QB	Quarterback	WR	Wide receiver
DT	Defensive tackle	RB	Running back	G	Guard
E	End	T	Offensive tackle	TE	Tight end

== Selections ==
Year	Round	Pick	Overall	Player	Team	Position
1938	2	5	15	Milt Popovich	Chicago Cardinals	B
1938	7	6	56	Paul Szakash	Detroit Lions	B
1938	8	3	63	Len Noyes	Brooklyn Dodgers	T
1939	16	7	147	Bill Lazetich	Detroit Lions	B
1939	21	1	191	Aldo Forte	Chicago Bears	T
1951	14	2	161	Ray Bauer	Green Bay Packers	E
1951	22	9	264	Bob Hanson	Chicago Bears	G
1951	24	2	281	Tom Kingsford	San Francisco 49ers	B
1953	28	11	336	Jim Murray	Los Angeles Rams	T
1953	30	11	360	Hal Maus	Detroit Lions	E
1956	15	5	174	Don Brant	Philadelphia Eagles	B
1957	16	9	190	Terry Hurley	Chicago Cardinals	E
1961	18	9	247	John Gregor	Detroit Lions	T
1965	12	9	163	Mike Tilleman	Minnesota Vikings	T
1966	13	12	197	Wayne Becker	Chicago Bears	T
1968	8	11	203	Brian Magnuson	Washington Redskins	RB
1969	10	1	235	Ron Baines	Buffalo Bills	WR
1970	9	12	220	Roy Robinson	Atlanta Falcons	DB
1970	16	6	396	Tuufuli Uperesa	Philadelphia Eagles	T
1972	2	15	41	Steve Okoniewski	Atlanta Falcons	T
1972	9	4	212	Willie Postler	Houston Oilers	T
1973	10	5	239	Cliff Burnett	San Diego Chargers	DE
1973	16	6	396	Jim Hann	St. Louis Cardinals	LB
1973	17	6	422	Barry Darrow	San Diego Chargers	T
1975	13	14	326	Ron Rosenberg	Cincinnati Bengals	LB
1976	4	10	102	Walt Brett	Atlanta Falcons	DE
1978	8	4	198	Terry Falcon	New England Patriots	G
1980	10	11	260	Guy Bingham	New York Jets	C
1982	9	24	247	Rocky Klever	New York Jets	RB
1982	12	26	332	Rich Burtness	Dallas Cowboys	G
1984	10	26	278	Brian Salonen	Dallas Cowboys	TE
1987	8	19	214	Mike Rice	New York Jets	P
1987	11	16	295	Brent Pease	Minnesota Vikings	QB
1988	8	26	219	Larry Clarkson	San Francisco 49ers	T
1988	9	10	231	Pat Foster	Los Angeles Rams	DT
1995	2	22	54	Scott Gragg	New York Giants	T
1999	6	34	203	Scott Curry	Green Bay Packers	G
2004	7	6	207	Dylan McFarland	Buffalo Bills	T
2005	5	22	158	Justin Green	Baltimore Ravens	RB
2008	5	19	154	Kroy Biermann	Atlanta Falcons	LB
2008	6	38	204	Lex Hilliard	Miami Dolphins	RB
2010	6	2	171	Shann Schillinger	Atlanta Falcons	DB
2010	7	15	222	Marc Mariani	Tennessee Titans	WR
2011	7	32	235	Jimmy Wilson	Miami Dolphins	DB
2012	3	2	65	Trumaine Johnson	St. Louis Rams	DB
2012	7	15	222	Caleb McSurdy	Dallas Cowboys	LB
2014	5	31	171	Jordan Tripp	Miami Dolphins	LB
2016	6	6	181	Tyrone Holmes	Jacksonville Jaguars	DE
2025	7	36	252	Junior Bergen	San Francisco 49ers	WR

== Notable undrafted players ==
Note: No drafts held before 1920

Year	Player	Position	Debut Team	Notes
1982	Mike Hagen	RB	Seattle Seahawks	—
1986	Mickey Sutton	DB	Los Angeles Rams	—
1990	Tim Hauck	S	New England Patriots	—
1990	Kirk Scrafford	T	Cincinnati Bengals	—
1997	Blaine McElmurry	S	Tennessee Oilers	—
2000	Kris Heppner	K	Seattle Seahawks	—
2000	Dallas Neil	TE	Atlanta Falcons	—
2001	Jimmy Farris	WR	San Francisco 49ers	—
2002	Thatcher Szalay	G	Cincinnati Bengals	—
2005	Cory Procter	G	Detroit Lions	—
2007	Tuff Harris	DB	Miami Dolphins	—
2008	Dan Carpenter	K	Miami Dolphins	—
2009	Colt Anderson	S	Minnesota Vikings	—
2011	Chase Reynolds	RB	Seattle Seahawks	—
2014	Brock Coyle	LB	Seattle Seahawks	—
2017	J. R. Nelson	CB	Kansas City Chiefs	—
2022	Dylan Cook	T	Tampa Bay Buccaneers	—
2023	Patrick O'Connell	LB	Seattle Seahawks	—
2026	Michael Wortham	WR	Jacksonville Jaguars	—
