= Mathias Willassen Hanssen =

Norwegian politician (born 1997)

Deputy Member of the Storting
- In office 2 October 2017 – 30 September 2021
- Constituency: Vestfold

Personal details
- Born: 24 September 1997 (age 28)
- Party: Conservative Party (since 2013)

Mathias Willassen Hanssen (born 24 September 1997) is a Norwegian politician. From 2017 to 2021 and from 2025 to 2029, he was a deputy member of the Storting. He has been a member of the Conservative Party since 2013.

He became leader of the Conservative Party in Vestfold, in 2026.
