= Henson (name) =

Henson is a surname and a given name. Notable people with the name include:

== Surname ==
- Adam Henson (born 1966), British television presenter
- Ant Henson (born 1989), British singer-songwriter
- Basil Henson (1918–1990), British actor
- Bill Henson (born 1955), Australian photographer
- Brian Henson (born 1963), American puppeteer, director, and producer
- Christian Henson (born 1971), British composer
- David Henson (born 1984), British athlete
- Deborah Henson-Conant (born 1953), American harpist
- Dinah Henson (1948–2020), English amateur golfer
- Drew Henson (born 1980), former Major League Baseball player and American football quarterback
- Elden Henson (born 1977), American actor
- Gavin Henson (born 1982), Welsh rugby union player, son of Alan Henson
- Gladys Henson (1897–1982), British actress
- Herbert Hensley Henson (1863–1947), British bishop
- Jane Henson (1934–2013), American puppeteer, wife of Jim Henson
- Jim Henson (1936–1990), American puppeteer and creator of the Muppets, as well as the organizations below that bear his name
- Jim Henson (escaped slave), American slave who escaped and settled in Canada
- Joe Henson (1932–2015), British conservationist
- John Henson (born 1967), American TV show host
- John Henson (puppeteer) (1965–2014), American puppeteer, son of Jim Henson
- Josiah Henson (1789–1883), famed fugitive American slave
- Josh Henson (born 1975), American football coach
- Keith Henson (born 1942), American science and science-fiction writer and activist against the Church of Scientology
- Leslie Henson (1891–1957), British actor
- Lisa Henson (born 1960), American television and movie producer
- Lou Henson (1932–2020), American college basketball coach
- Martin Henson (computer scientist) (born 1954), British computer scientist
- Matthew Henson (1866–1955), an American explorer who may have been the first to reach the geographic North Pole with Robert Peary in 1909
- Mishavonna Henson, American Idol contestant
- Mike Henson (1963–2002), American actor and model
- Mickie Henson (1963–2022), American professional wrestling referee
- Nicky Henson (1945–2019), British actor, son of Leslie Henson
- Olivia Grace Henson (born 1992), the Duchess of Westminster
- Richard A. Henson (1910–2002), an American test pilot, flight school operator, and founder of the modern "commuter airline" concept
- Rozia Henson, American politician
- Shandelle Henson (born 1964), American mathematician
- Shaneka Henson (born 1983), American politician from Maryland
- Steve Henson (politician) (born 1959), American politician from Georgia
- Taraji P. Henson (born 1970), American actress and singer
- Tim Henson (born 1993), American guitarist
- William Henson (Australian politician) (1826–1903), New South Wales politician
- William Samuel Henson (1812–1888), British aviation pioneer

== Given name ==
- Henson P. Barnes (1934–2015), American politician
- Henson Cargill (1941–2007), American country music singer
- Henson Moore (born 1939), American politician

== See also ==
- Hanson (surname)
