= Henriette Hansen =

Henriette Hansen may refer to:

- Henriette Hansen (actress) (1814–1892), Norwegian stage actress, opera singer and ballet dancer
- Henriette Hansen (cricketer), Danish cricketer
- Henriette Hansen (handballer) (born 1998), Danish handball player
- Henriette Engel Hansen (born 1982), Danish canoeist

== See also ==
- Henriette Bonde-Hansen (born 1963), Danish operatic soprano
