= Nils Hansen =

German politician (born 1988)

Member of the Hamburg Parliament
- Incumbent
- Assumed office 18 March 2020

Personal details
- Born: 20 March 1988 (age 38) Hamburg
- Party: Social Democratic Party (since 2008)

Nils Olaf Hansen (né Springborn; born 20 March 1988 in Hamburg) is a German politician serving as a member of the Hamburg Parliament since 2020. From 2010 to 2013, he served as chairman of Jusos in Bergedorf.
