= Hansen =

Hansen may refer to:

== Places ==
- Cape Hansen, Antarctica
- Hansen, Idaho, town in the United States
- Hansen, Nebraska, United States
- Hansen, Wisconsin, town in the United States
- Hansen Township, Ontario, Canada
- Hansen, Germany, a small parish in the borough of Uelzen

== Other ==
- Hansen (surname), includes a list of people with the name
- Hansen's, a beverage company now known as Monster Beverage
- Hansen's problem, a problem in trigonometry
- Hansen (crater), a lunar crater
- Hansen Writing Ball, an early kind of typewriter from Denmark
- Hansen's disease, another name for leprosy
- Helly-Hansen, Norwegian manufacturer of sports, work, and outdoor gear
- Hansen (horse)
- Hansen (music publisher), Danish music publishing firm
- Chr. Hansen, a Danish chemical and biotechnology company
- Hansen Narinesingh, Trinidad and Tobago politician

== See also ==
- Hanson (disambiguation)
- Justice Hansen (disambiguation)
