= Samantha Hansen =

American seismologist

Samantha E. Hansen is an American seismologist whose research uses tomography to image the structure of the Earth's crust and upper mantle, especially focusing on Antarctica and the mountain-like structures hidden under its ice. She is a professor in the Department of Geological Sciences of the University of Alabama.

== Education and career ==
Hansen majored in geological engineering and geosciences at the University of Wisconsin–Madison, where she received her bachelor's degree in 2000 and a master's degree in 2002. She continued her studies in earth and planetary sciences at the University of California, Santa Cruz. Advised there by Susan Schwartz and Arthur J. Rodgers, she completed her Ph.D. in 2007.

After postdoctoral research at Pennsylvania State University, Hansen joined the University of Alabama as an assistant professor in 2010. She was promoted to associate professor in 2015 and full professor in 2020, supported by the George Lindahl III Endowment from 2019 to 2024. She has been assistant department chair since 2025.

In 2017 she traveled to Greece as a Fulbright Scholar.

== Recognition ==
Hansen was a 2012 recipient of the Presidential Early Career Award for Scientists and Engineers, "for her innovative research that will provide critical constraints on the goedynamic evolution of the Antarctic Continent as well as information to better constrain evolution of the Antarctic ice sheets, and for developing novel approaches to reach underrepresented students and expose them to the geosciences".
