= Sir Charles Hanson, 1st Baronet =

British politician

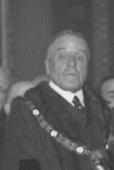
Hanson in 1917

Sir Charles Augustin Hanson, 1st Baronet (1846 – 17 January 1922) of Fowey was a British politician and 590th Lord Mayor of London.

He was born in Cornwall to master mariner Joseph Hanson and Mary Ann Hicks and was educated at Fowey School. He emigrated to Canada, where he made his fortune in the lumber business and returned to Cornwall c.1890. Whilst in Canada he married Martha Sabine Applebe, a wealthy Canadian heiress, with whom he had a son and a daughter. On his return he bought a tract of land in Cornwall and built Fowey Hall in 1899. However he spent much of his time in London as a stockbroker.

He was pricked High Sheriff of Cornwall for 1907–08. In 1908 he was awarded the Cross of Knight of the Order of Francis Joseph, which was conferred on him by the Emperor of Austria for services rendered.

He became an alderman of the City of London in 1909. He was made Sheriff of the City of London in 1911–12 and Lord Mayor of London in 1917–18. He was created a baronet on 6 July 1918. On 20 December 1920, he was appointed a deputy lieutenant of Cornwall. In 1920 he was made a Commander of the Order of the Redeemer by the King of Greece and awarded the Order of the Sacred Treasure by the Emperor of Japan.

He was also a Coalition Conservative Member of Parliament (MP) for Bodmin in Cornwall from 1916 to his death in 1922. His son, Sir Charles Hanson, 2nd Baronet was to become a Lieutenant of London.

== Trivia ==
- Fowey Hall was the inspiration behind Toad Hall in the 1908 children's book The Wind in the Willows by Kenneth Grahame.
- There have been 3 Lord Mayors of London called Hanson
- Sir William Purdie Treloar was another Cornish Lord mayor of London.
- Sir Charles owned the first Troy class boat

== Sources ==
- Leigh Rayment's list of baronets
- Leigh Rayment's Historical List of MPs

Honorary titles
Preceded by Sir William Dunn, Bt	Lord Mayor of London; 1917–1918	Succeeded by Horace Brooks Marshall
Parliament of the United Kingdom
Preceded by Reginald Pole-Carew	Member of Parliament for Bodmin; 1916–1922	Succeeded by Isaac Foot
Baronetage of the United Kingdom
New creation	Baronet (of Fowey); 1918–1922	Succeeded by Charles Hanson
