= Reagan Branch =

American stream in Missouri

Coordinates: 37°29′02″N 90°04′49″W

Reagan Branch is a stream in Bollinger County in the U.S. state of Missouri. It is a tributary of Crooked Creek.

Reagan Branch has the name of Dr. Mathias M. Reagan, an early settler.

== See also ==
- List of rivers of Missouri
