= Siegfried Hansen =

American electrical engineer and inventor

Siegfried Hansen (March 29, 1912 – June 28, 2002) was an American electrical engineer and inventor notable for his development of the early Mark I space suit., a role that earned him appellations of "Space Suit Father" and "Space Suit Pioneer". The Mark I was significant for its hard torso and flexible arms, providing constant volume while allowing the occupant to manipulate the external environment. These efforts broke briefly into the mainstream with Hansen's in-suit appearance on the cover of the December 1957 issue of Look magazine.

Hansen was born in San Francisco and educated at the University of Washington in Seattle (majored in electrical engineering)
