= David Hansen (academic) =

American academic

David Hansen is the Philosophy and Education Program Director and John L & Sue Ann Weinberg Professor in Historical & Philosophical Foundations of Education at Teachers' College. Hansen received his BA from the University of Chicago, his MA from Stanford University, and his Ph.D. from the University of Chicago.

== Select publications ==
- John Dewey's Call for Meaning, Education and Culture (2004)
- John Dewey and a Curriculum of Moral Knowledge, Curriculum and Teaching Knowledge (2007)
- Dewey's Conception of an Environment for Teaching and Learning (2002)
- Call to Teach and its 2021 sequel, Reimagining the call to teach: A witness to teachers and teaching, the latter of which received the 2022 Critics' Choice Book Award from the American Educational Studies
- The Teacher and the World: A Study of Cosmopolitanism as Education
- Ethical Visions of Education
- The Witness as Educator (2025)

== Honors ==
Hansen received the 2024 John Dewey Society Lifetime Achievement Award, was named a Fellow of the American Educational Research Association in 2011, and served as president of the John Dewey Society and the Philosophy of Education Society. Hansen was elected to the National Academy of Education in 2025.
