= Harold Hanson =

Harold Hanson or Hal Hanson may refer to:

== Sports ==
- Harold Hanson (soccer) (born 1999), American soccer player
- Hal Hanson (American football, born 1895) (Harold William Hanson, 1895–1973), American football player and coach
- Hal Hanson (American football, born 1905) (Harold Walter Hanson, 1905–1977), American football player

== Others ==
- Harold Hanson (lawyer) (1904–1973), South African advocate
- Harold E. Hanson (died 1978), mayor of Madison, Wisconsin

== See also ==
- Harold Hansen (disambiguation)
