= Harold I. Hansen =

American theatre professor (1914–1992)

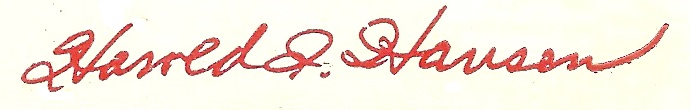
Harold I. Hansen

Harold Ivan Hansen (1914–1992) was an American theatre professor at Brigham Young University (BYU) and the director of the Hill Cumorah Pageant from 1937 to 1977, excluding the years during World War II in which it was not held.

Hansen was born in Logan, Utah. Hansen did his undergraduate education at Utah State University. He then received an offer of a graduate assistantship at the University of Idaho to continue studies in drama, but at the urging of David O. McKay he accepted the call he had already received to serve in the Eastern States Mission. Hansen had very much hoped to serve in Denmark. It was while a missionary in the Eastern States mission that Hansen first served as director of the Hill Cumorah Pageant. Although pageants had been produced at the Hill Cumorah the previous two years, 1937 was the first year that H. Wayne Driggs' script, which would be the basis of the pageant until 1987, was used. Thus as the first director Hansen essentially had to figure out the ways to move from the script to actual production that would remain the main outline of the production for the next half-century, or ten years beyond his retirement as director.

It was also there that he met Betty Kotter, also serving as a missionary in the mission, who he later married. They were actually married at the flagpole on the Hill Cumorah on July 16, 1940, just before a production of the Hill Cumorah Pageant, and about a year after Hansen had finished his mission. Harold would later claim this was where he and Betty first met, but she claimed the story he told of their first encounter was largely made up. They were sealed in the Logan Temple the following month.

After his mission Hansen earned a master's degree in drama at Iowa State University. His thesis was on the history of drama as supported by religious institutions in the United States. From 1941 to 1942 Hansen was a seminary and institute instructor with the Church Educational System. He then performed at The Cleveland Play House until 1945 when he joined the faculty of Michigan State University. He then returned to Utah State University where he joined the Drama faculty and earned a Ph.D. in 1949 with the subject of his doctoral dissertation being a history of Mormon Theatre. In 1952 Hansen was recruited by Brigham Young University president Ernest L. Wilkinson to replace T. Earl Pardoe as head of the Drama department. From his start at BYU Hansen was producing cutting edge shows. During his first season he managed to perform both The Glass Menagerie and Death of a Salesman. The reason this was exceptional is that at the time both shows were still running on broadway. In many ways the biggest BYU production done by Hansen was Sand in their Shoes, a musical about the Mormon Pioneers with text by Don Oscarson and music by Crawford Gates.

While head of the BYU Theatre Department Hansen oversaw the implementation of graduate studies in 1960 and the move to suitable space in the Harris Fine Arts Center in 1965. Hansen remained the head of the BYU Theatre Department until 1979.

While working at BYU Hansen was also involved as the co-owner and co-director with Lael Woodbury of the Ledges Theatre in Grand Ledge, Michigan from 1960 to 1967. They had previously from 1947 to 1952 run the Proscenium Players, also in Grand Ledge, from 1947 to 1952. From the end of World War II until 1977 Hansen had also served as director of the Hill Cumorah Pageant. In 1977 Hansen was replaced as director of the Hill Cumorah Pageant by Jack Paul Sederholm, who had studied at BYU and was then chair of the communications art department at Elizabethtown College in Pennsylvania. Sederholm had served for 12 years previously as Hansen's chief assistant.

In 1967 BYU Press published a book authored by Hansen with the same title as his doctoral dissertation.

Hansen and his wife Betty were the parents of four daughters.

The Harris Fine Arts Center has a rehearsal hall named for Hansen.

== Sources ==
- Register of the L. Tom Perry Special Collections Library Harold I. Hansen collection
- A Brief History of the Hill Cumorah Pageant
