= Harald Hansen =

Harald Hansen may refer to:

- Harald Hansen (businessman) (1835–1902), Danish businessman and politician
- Harald Hansen (footballer) (1884–1927), Danish footballer
- Harald Hansen (gymnast), Norwegian gymnast
- Harald Hansen (painter) (1890–1967), Danish painter
