= Jutta Hanson =

German electrical engineer

Jutta Hanson (born 1967) is a German electrical engineer, the Chair of Electrical Power Systems with Integration of Renewable Energies in the Department of Electrical Engineering and Information Technology at Technische Universität Darmstadt. Her research focuses on electrical grid planning; she is also active in the governance of energy associations and in informing the public about the transition to green energy.

Hanson was a student of electrical engineering at TU Darmstadt, completing a diploma in 1994 and her doctorate in 2000. She worked in industry for ABB from 1999 to 2011, and returned to TU Darmstadt as a professor in 2010. She was dean of the Department of Electrical Engineering and Information Technology from 2016 to 2018.

She is a member of acatech, the German Academy of Science and Engineering, and of the Academy of Sciences and Literature in Mainz.
