= Summers Creek =

Stream in the U.S. state of Missouri

Summers Creek is a stream in Bollinger County in the U.S. state of Missouri. It is a tributary of Crooked Creek.

The stream headwaters arise along the east side of Missouri Route O at 37°29′02″N 90°06′50″W and an elevation of approximately 880 feet. The stream flows to the south-southeast past Younts Store and under Missouri Route A. The stream continues on to the southeast for about two miles to its confluence with Crooked Creek approximately two miles south-southwest of Tallent at 37°26′20″N 90°04′47″W and an elevation of 696 feet.

Summers Creek has the name of the local Summers family of settlers.

== See also ==
- List of rivers of Missouri
