= Susan Schwartz =

Seismologist

Susan Y. Schwartz
- Education: University of Michigan
- Scientific career
- Workplaces: University of California, Santa Cruz
- Thesis: Fault zone heterogeneity and earthquake occurrence in subduction zones (1988)
- Doctoral students: Samantha Hansen

Susan Y. Schwartz is a scientist at the University of California, Santa Cruz known for her research on earthquakes, through field projects conducted in locations in Costa Rica and the San Andreas Fault.

== Education and career ==
Schwartz has an Sc.B. from Brown University (1981) and an M.S. (1983) and a Ph.D. (1988) from the University of Michigan. During her Ph.D., she worked on the occurrence of earthquakes in subduction zones, including the Solomon Islands, the 1968 Tokachi earthquake, and the southern Kuril Islands. At the University of California, Santa Cruz, Schwartz was first a postdoctoral fellow from 1988 until 1990, followed by four years as an assistant research seismologist, and then in 1994 she was hired as an assistant professor and was subsequently promoted to professor in 2002.

In 2016 Schwartz was elected a fellow of the American Geophysical Union who cited her "for fundamental work that places subduction zone earthquakes in tectonic context".

== Research ==
Schwartz's research interests center on the mechanics of earthquakes in subduction zones and variations in earthquakes on regional scales. While at the University of Michigan, she worked on paleomagnetism in the Wyoming-Idaho region and the folding of the Appalachian Mountains. Her research has taken her to multiple field locations including the Southern Kurile Islands, New Zealand, and Costa Rica. Her research on the 2012 Costa Rica earthquake relied on instrumentation installed in the region prior to the earthquake which allowed her to define spatial variability in the fluids beneath the plate that impact the formation of earthquakes in the region. She has also examined the seismology of the 1971 Solomon Islands earthquakes. Schwartz was a postdoc working in California during the 1989 Loma Prieta earthquake and in 2014 she recalled her feelings during the day of the earthquake and her realization of the importance of the "human element" of her research in seismology.

=== Selected publications ===
- Wallace, Laura M.; Webb, Spahr C.; Ito, Yoshihiro; Mochizuki, Kimihiro; Hino, Ryota; Henrys, Stuart; Schwartz, Susan Y.; Sheehan, Anne F. (2016-05-06). "Slow slip near the trench at the Hikurangi subduction zone, New Zealand". Science. 352 (6286): 701–704. Bibcode:2016Sci...352..701W. doi:10.1126/science.aaf2349. PMID 27151867. S2CID 206647253.
- Bilek, Susan L.; Schwartz, Susan Y.; DeShon, Heather R. (2003-05-01). "Control of seafloor roughness on earthquake rupture behavior". Geology. 31 (5): 455–458. Bibcode:2003Geo....31..455B. doi:10.1130/0091-7613(2003)031<0455:COSROE>2.0.CO;2. ISSN 0091-7613.
- Schwartz, Susan Y.; Rokosky, Juliana M. (2007). "Slow slip events and seismic tremor at circum-Pacific subduction zones". Reviews of Geophysics. 45 (3). Bibcode:2007RvGeo..45.3004S. doi:10.1029/2006RG000208. ISSN 1944-9208. S2CID 128205122.

== Awards and honors ==
- Fellow, American Geophysical Union (2016)
