= Jim Henson (memorialist) =

Former slave

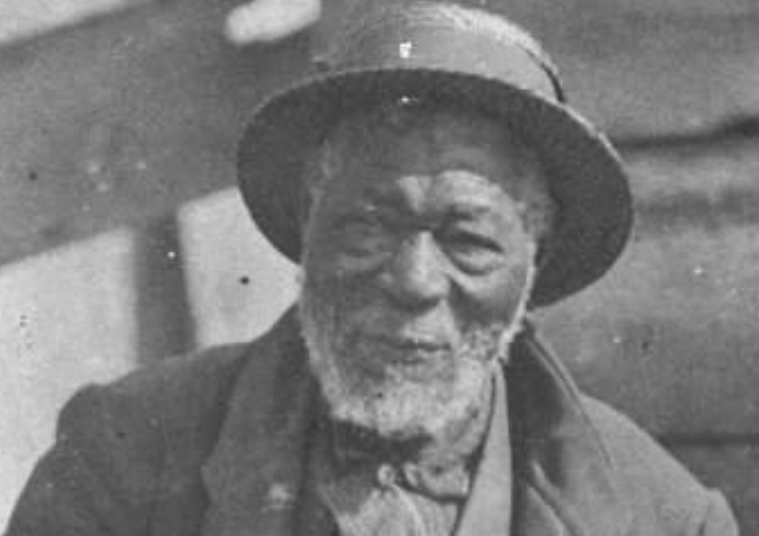
- Henson in 1888
- Born: Maryland
- Occupation: Farmer
- Known for: escaped slavery and dictated a memoir

Jim Henson (fl. late 1800s) was an African-American man who was enslaved in Maryland, U.S. Henson escaped slavery, and made his way to Canada, where his slave narrative, entitled Broken Shackles, was published in 1889.

== Biography ==
After his escape from slavery, Henson settled in Owen Sound, on Georgian Bay.

Henson's maternal grandmother, Chandesia, was the daughter of a chieftain of the Bagirmi people, in what is now Chad, when she was kidnapped.

In his review future poet-laureate of Canada George Elliot Clarke cheered the 2002 republication of Henson's memoirs, characterizing it as "one of the humble wellsprings of what we now proudly term African-Canadian literature."

He traveled through Pennsylvania and New York State on his way to Canada.

Henson had seven different masters while he was a slave. His first master's widow had promised to free all of her slaves when they reached the age of 35, but she died before he reached 35. At the time he escaped he needed only to make his way to Pennsylvania in order to be free. He lived there for several years and then decided to make his home in Canada after the passage of a law that allowed bounty hunters to seize any African Americans inside the United states which they suspected were fugitive slaves.

In 1889, when John Frost wrote Henson's memoirs, based on his oral account of his life, the book's publication led to Henson reuniting with his long-lost wife. Henson was able to join her in Philadelphia, and they were able to spend their final months of life together.
