= Hamson (surname) =

Hamson is a surname. Notable people with the name include:

- C. J. Hamson (1905–1987), British jurist and lecturer
- Gary Hamson (born 1959), English footballer
- Jennifer Hamson (born 1992), American basketball and volleyball player
- Tresa Spaulding Hamson (born 20th century), American basketball player

== See also ==
- Hampson (surname)
- Hanson
