= Margaret Murray Hanson =

American Astronomer and Educator

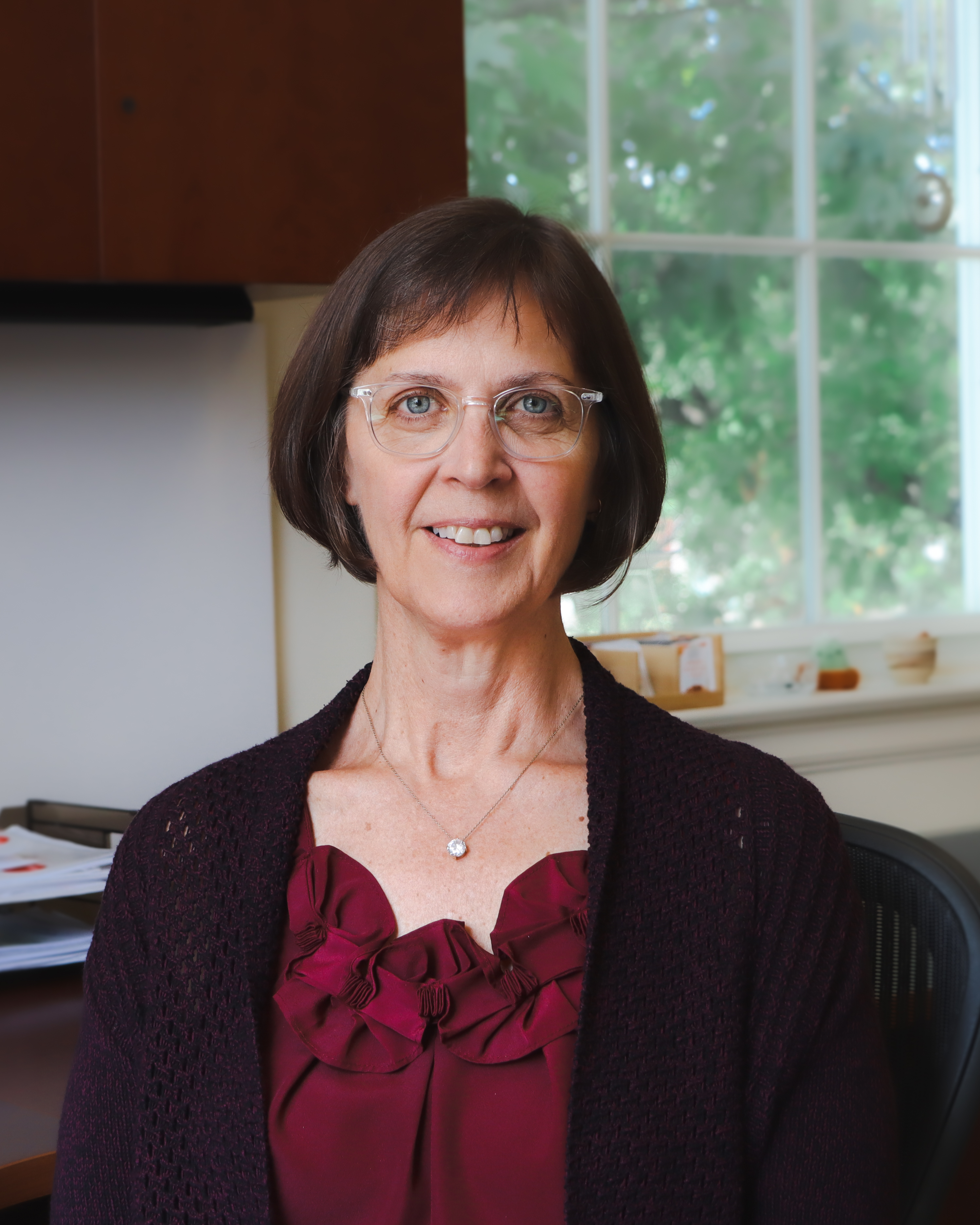

Margaret M. Hanson (née Murray) is an American astronomer and academic at the University of Cincinnati where she is Associate Dean for Natural Sciences. She has been serving as an academic administrator since 2011, most recently as the Interim Dean of the College of Arts and Sciences.

== Career ==
Hanson started her professional astronomy career as a Hubble Postdoctoral Fellow in late 1995 at the University of Arizona, working with George H. Rieke and Marcia Rieke. She became an assistant professor in the Department of Physics at the University of Cincinnati in 1998, was tenured and promoted to associate professor in 2003 and became full professor in 2009.

From 2005 to 2012, she served as Associate Editor-in-Chief for The Astronomical Journal, the oldest professional journal in astronomy in the United States. She was twice elected for a leadership position in the American Astronomical Society.

In 2011, she moved to the Graduate School to serve as Associate University Dean at the University of Cincinnati. In 2016, she returned to the College of Arts & Sciences as the Associate Dean, then Divisional Dean for Natural Sciences. In 2021, she became Interim Dean for the College of Arts and Sciences at the University of Cincinnati.

In 2020, she co-chaired the Panel on State of the Profession and Societal Impacts, as part of the National Academies decadal survey Astro2020. This same year she was named a Legacy (inaugural) Fellow of the American Astronomical Society.

== Research ==
Hanson's research interest is in observational (experimental) astronomy. Over her astronomy career, this has included observing and publishing research at ultraviolet, optical, infrared, millimeter and centimeter wavelengths, where she has studied extragalactic, galactic, interstellar and stellar phenomenon. Her most recent research used infrared spectroscopy of hot, massive stars to accurately characterize the atmosphere of these unique stars and to search for massive stellar clusters found deeply embedded within the Milky Way Galaxy.

In late 2024, her publications had an h-index of 36.

== Awards and honors ==
- 1995: Hubble Post-Doctoral Research Fellow (Steward Observatory) University of Arizona
- 2001: National Science Foundation CAREER Awardee
- 2002: Edith C. Alexander Award for Distinguished Teaching, University of Cincinnati
- 2003: Science & Technology Award, Leading Women of Cincinnati
- 2010: Young Investigator Award, Sigma Xi
- 2011: Elected Fellow, Royal Astronomical Society
- 2020: Elected (Legacy) Fellow, American Astronomical Society

== Select publications ==
- Dickey, J. M., Hanson, M. M., & Helou, G. (1990). NGC 1058-Gas motions in an extended, quiescent spiral disk. Astrophysical Journal, 352, 522–531.
- Hanson, M. M., Conti, P. S., & Rieke, M. J. (1996). A spectral atlas of hot, luminous stars at 2 microns. The Astrophysical Journal Supplement Series, 107, 281.
- Hanson, M. M., Howarth, I. D., & Conti, P. S. (1997). The young massive stellar objects of M17. The Astrophysical Journal, 489(2), 698.
- Hanson, M. M. (2003). A Study of Cygnus OB2: Pointing the Way toward Finding Our Galaxy's Super-Star Clusters. The Astrophysical Journal, 597(2), 957.
- Hanson, M. M., Kudritzki, R. P., Kenworthy, M. A., Puls, J., & Tokunaga, A. T. (2005). A medium resolution near-infrared spectral atlas of O and early-B stars. The Astrophysical Journal Supplement Series, 161(1), 154.
- Najarro, F., Hanson, M.M., Puls, J. (2011) L-band Spectroscopy of Galactic OB-Stars, Astronomy & Astrophysics 535, A32
- Popescu, B., Hanson, M.M., Elmegreen, B.G. (2012) Age and Mass for 920 LMC Clusters Derived from 100 Million Monte Carlo Simulations, The Astrophysical Journal 751 (2), 122.
