= Craig J. Hansen =

American writer

- Born: 12 March 1954 (age 72); Green Bay, Wisconsin
- Education: University of Illinois (BA, MA) University of Minnesota (PhD)
- Occupations: Musician, writer and retired dean of the college of liberal arts at Metropolitan State University
- Children: 2 children
- Writing career
- Language: English
- Subjects: Political Science, anthropology, English; focus on technical communication
- Notable works: The Skeleton Train, Winter Lake & The Morning Door

Craig J. Hansen (born 1954) is an American novelist, musician and retired professor and Dean from Wisconsin, now living in Stillwater, Minnesota.

== Biography ==
=== Early life ===
Hansen was born in Green Bay, Wisconsin and lived in Illinois from the age of 10 to 25. He earned a Bachelor of Arts in Political Science (with a minor in English and Anthropology) in 1976, and a Master of Arts in English in 1980; both from the University of Illinois. In 1993 he completed a Ph.D. in English at the University of Minnesota with a focus on Technical Communication. During the years between his MA and Ph.D., he worked in the computer industry in a variety of technical and managerial positions.

=== Career ===
Hansen has published several academic articles and a few short stories, but The Skeleton Train is his first novel. Published in 2010 by Sky Blue Waters Press, The Skeleton Train tells the story of Jason Audley; what many have referred to as a modern-day Huckleberry Finn. Jason narrates a story that begins when he is fourteen in an industrial Illinois town. The story includes his closest friend, Davey, and a young woman they encounter while hopping freight trains called The Pheadra.

Hansen's second novel, Winter Lake, published in 2012, is a sequel to The Skeleton Train and picks up Jason's life in northern Wisconsin seven years later. He continues to narrate the story as a drummer in a band with his trademark wit and wry sense of humor.

Hansen's third novel, The Morning Door, published in 2014, is the third in the Jason Audley series, and continues Jason's story as an adult in Northwest Wisconsin.

Hansen is also the co-author of Nonacademic Writing: Social Theory and Technology, published in 1995 by Lawrence Erlbaum.

In 2020, he retired as dean of the college of liberal arts at Metropolitan State University in Saint Paul, Minnesota.

=== Music ===
Hansen is a musician (http://craigjhansen.com/) who devotes equal time to writing and music. Hansen is totally blind, due to a degenerative eye disease.

Hansen has released five albums: Water and Trees (2026), News From Terra Mojo (2024), Winter, Winter, Summer Winter: Songs From Up North (2023), Artifacts (2022) and Deadeyes (2021). In addition, Hansen has released and continues to release many singles. He fully creates his own music which is widely available on all streaming services. Hansen composes in a variety of styles, ranging from blues to rock to Americana. Along with writing the music and the lyrics, he provides all vocals and plays all of the instruments: lead, bass and rhythm guitar, steel guitar, drums, keyboards, mandolin, banjo and accordion.

He plays lead guitar (but is not an original member) for the More-Tishans, a local band in Stillwater, Minnesota that had the one-hit-wonder, (I've got) Nowhere to Run, in 1966. He also plays guitar for the group Cattail Moon Band. He's played the guitar in many bands since the age of fourteen, and can also play the mandolin and accordion.

=== Personal life ===
Hansen lives in Stillwater, Minnesota with his wife.

== Bibliography ==
- Nonacademic Writing: Social Theory and Technology (1995)
- The Skeleton Train (2010)
- Winter Lake (2012)
- The Morning Door (2014)

== Discography ==
- Water and Trees (2026)
- News From Terra Mojo (2024)
- Winter, Winter, Summer, Winter: Songs From Up North (2023)
- Artifacts (2022)
- Deadeyes (2021)
