= Indian Creek (Crooked Creek tributary) =

Stream in the U.S. state of Missouri

Indian Creek is a stream in Bollinger County in the U.S. state of Missouri. It is a tributary of Crooked Creek.

The stream headwaters arise at 37°24′48″N 90°03′06″W at an elevation of approximately 770 feet just to the southwest of the intersection of Missouri Route 51 and Missouri Route OO and it flows south parallel to Route 51 for approximately three miles to its confluence with Crooked Creek at 37°21′55″N 90°03′32″W at and elevation of 525 feet.

Indian Creek was named for the fact traces of Indian settlement were found along its course.

== See also ==
- List of rivers of Missouri
