= Monica Hansen =

Norwegian model

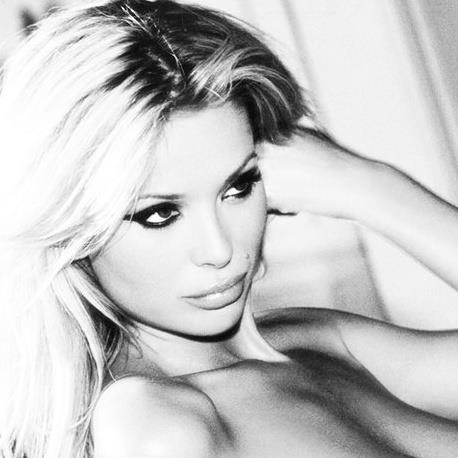
- Born: Tønsberg, Norway
- Occupations: Model and television host
- Height: 1.78 m (5 ft 10 in)
- Awards: 1997 Miss Norway
- Website: http://www.monicahansen.com/

Monica Hansen is a Norwegian model and the 1997 Miss Norway.

== Early life ==
Hansen was raised in the town of Tønsberg, Norway.

== Modeling career ==
Hansen began her modeling career with the Elite modeling agency. She was entered into the 1997 Miss Universe Norway pageant by her friend as a joke, but went on to win the contest becoming the 1997 Miss Norway. After winning, she was unable to compete at the Miss Universe pageant due to an illness. On the way to the airport en route to the competition she experienced acute pain and required surgery to remove her gallbladder. Hansen appeared in a 1997 issue of Perfect 10 magazine, when she came in second behind Ashley Degenford in Perfect 10 magazine's first annual model search. In 1999 she was a runway model for the Pax TV television series Destination Stardom filmed in Honolulu, Hawaii.

Hansen has posed for magazines including Esquire, Maxim, and Stuff. In 2006 she was named Maxim's woman of the year. That year she was also named the "babe of the month" in February by Playboy magazine and she has appeared on magazine covers including Elle. In 2009 Monica Hansen won a lawsuit regarding a libel action, in which photographs of her were used without her permission as an advertisement on a plastic surgery website. Monica Hansen was also the main character on the Norwegian TV show Ja, Vi Elsker Hollywood. Additionally, she appeared as the character "Monica Fox" on the television series Battledome.

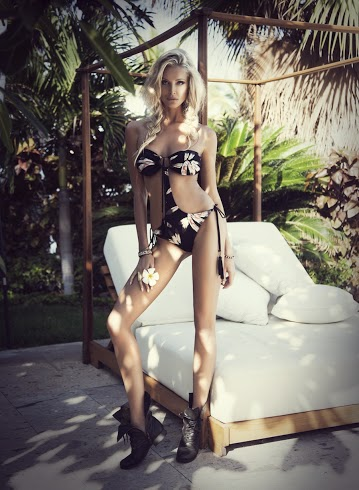
Monica Hansen wearing one of her own swimsuit designs

In December 2013 Monica Hansen formed a California LLC under the name of Monica Hansen Beachwear LLC which is a boutique swimwear and beachwear design business geared towards the high end, trendy, fashionable female demographic in their 20s and the 30s. She was granted registration of the trademarks for Monica Hansen Beachwear and also Monica Hansen Swimwear by the USPTO in the first part of 2014.
