= Cushing Academy =

Prep school in Ashburnham, Massachusetts, US

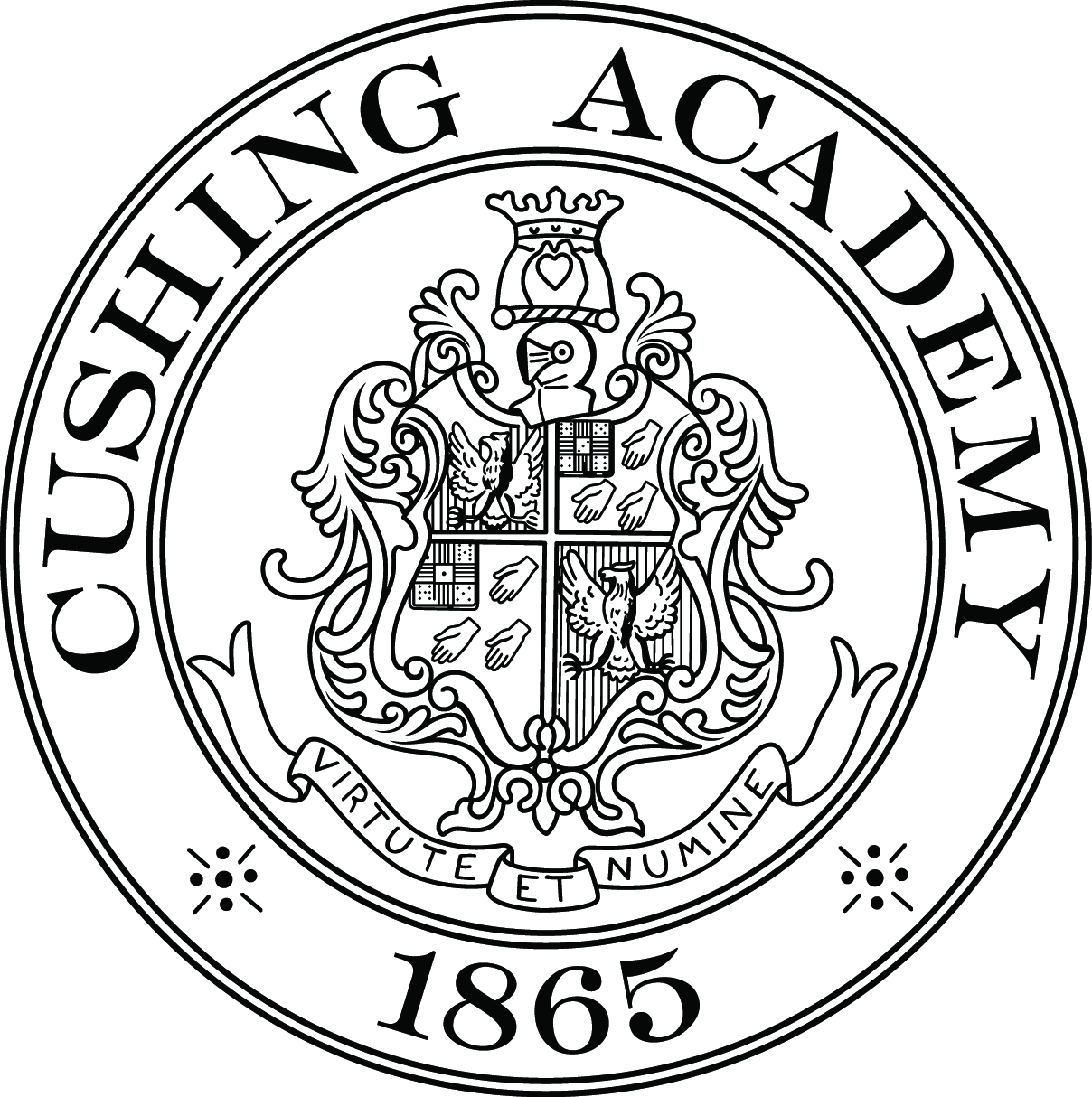
- Cushing Academy seal

Location
- Ashburnham, Massachusetts; United States; 42°38′0″N 71°54′48″W

Information
- Type: Private, college-prep, day and boarding
- Motto: Virtute et numine
- Established: 1865
- Founder: Thomas Parkman Cushing
- CEEB code: 220050
- Head of School: Randy R. Bertin
- Gender: Co-educational
- Enrollment: 400
- Average class size: 12
- Student to teacher ratio: 8:1
- Campus: 162 acres (0.66 km^{2})
- Colors: Purple and white
- Song: The Dear Old Cushing Days
- Athletics conference: NEPSAC
- Mascot: Penguin
- Accreditation: NEASC
- Tuition: $63,700 (boarding); $43,400 (day)
- Website: cushing.org

Cushing Academy is a private, coeducational college-preparatory school for boarding and day students in Ashburnham, Massachusetts, United States. It serves approximately 400 students in grades 9–12 and a postgraduate year.

== History ==
Cushing Academy was founded in 1865 by Thomas Parkman Cushing, a Boston merchant. Upon his death, Thomas Parkman Cushing bequeathed money to establish Cushing Academy. Following a provision from his will, the money accumulated for ten years before a board of trustees applied for an act of incorporation. On May 15, 1865, the Great and General Court of Massachusetts granted a charter, and the Academy opened in 1875 on land formerly known as Bancroft Farm. Cushing opened in September 1875 with a coeducational student body: 66 boys and 56 girls. The first principal was Edwin Pierce. It was among the first coeducational boarding schools on the east coast.

The alma mater, The Dear Old Cushing Days, was written by alumna Cora Coolidge, a distant relative of Calvin Coolidge.

Cushing is located on a 162-acre campus that overlooks the town center of Ashburnham, which is about 62 miles from Boston. The campus occupies hills with a view of Mount Wachusett to the south and Mount Monadnock to the north.

Though Cushing has never been affiliated with a religious denomination, early generations of students were required to submit reports of the services they attended once a week and attend services daily. The church attendance requirement was dropped entirely in 1970 at the appeal of the student body.

A statue, the Schoolboy of 1850, honors both students and, more specifically, boys who fought in the Civil War. It was designed by Bela Pratt and was donated to Ashburnham by local businessman Ivers Whitney Adams in 1913. The statue is now located near the entrance to Cushing. In 2005, female students designed and created a schoolgirl statue.

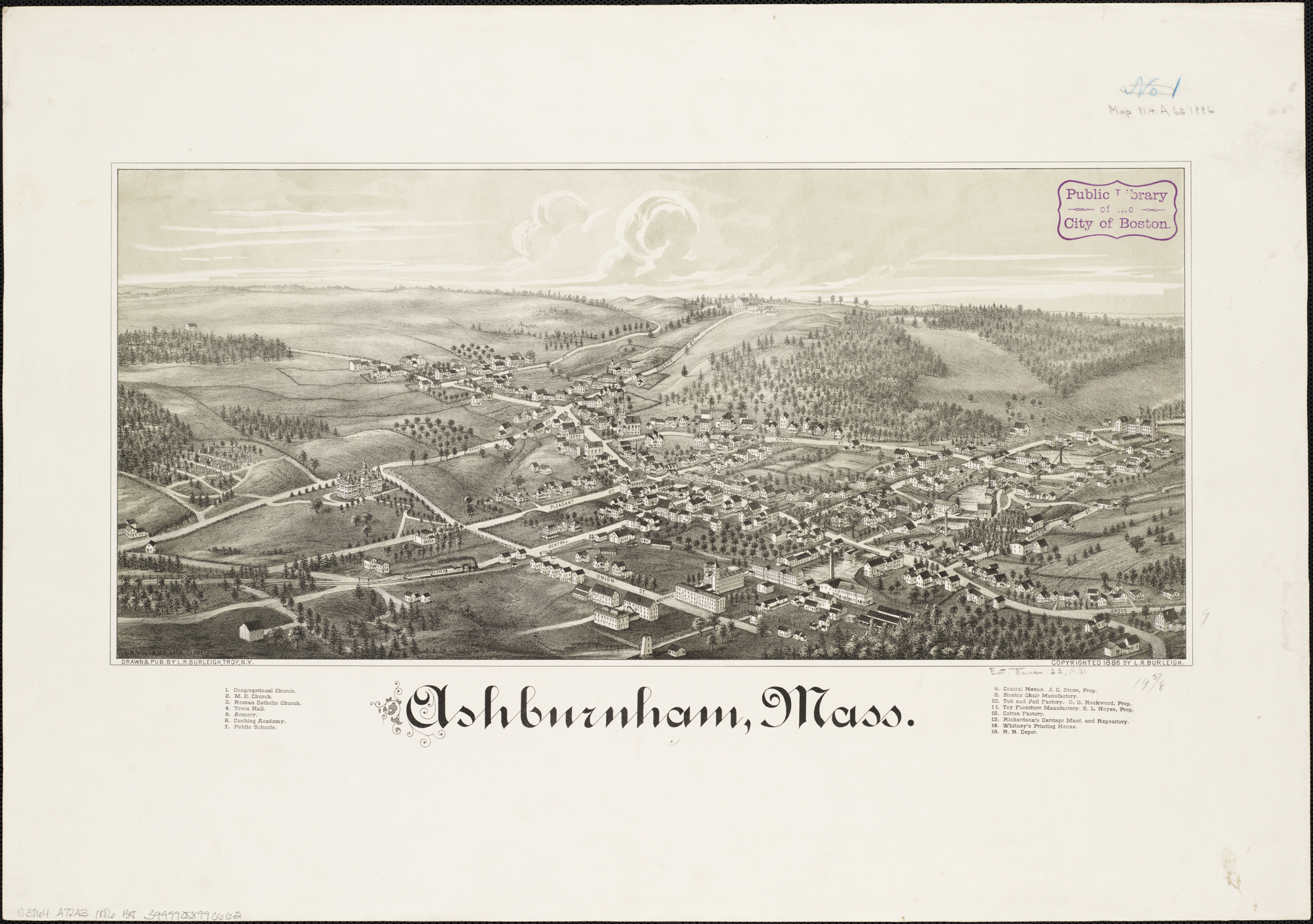
Print of Ashburnham from 1886 by L.R. Burleigh with list of landmarks depicted including Cushing Academy

In 2009, Cushing made headlines for its plans to spend $500,000 transforming the Fisher-Watkins Library into a learning center with e-readers, e-book database subscriptions, flat-screen televisions, laptop-friendly study carrels, and a coffee shop. Several months later, the headmaster stated that most of the library's printed books would be replaced over a two-year period with e-books, but reassured that "books, in all formats, will continue to abound at Cushing." As of 2018, the library has thousands of print books as well as online databases with access to e-books, journals, and more.

In 2015, Cushing Academy celebrated its sesquicentennial with several events and the publication of a commemorative magazine.

In October 2017, the board of trustees announced that Randy R. Bertin, Ed.D., of Besant Hill School in Ojai, California, was unanimously appointed the 13th Head of Cushing Academy, effective July 1, 2018.

== Demographics and statistics ==
As of fall 2018, the student body has 390 students, 59% male and 41% female. Financial aid assists 38% of the students. Thirty-four percent are from Massachusetts and 18% are domestic students of color.

The student body comes from 25 states and 30 countries; 39% of students are international and 88% of students board at Cushing. Cushing began accepting international students in 1889. The faculty-student ratio is 1:8 and 57% of faculty holds advanced degrees.

The middle 50% of the Class of 2019 had a combined SAT score range of 1030–1310. Ninety-five percent of the class of 2018 attended four-year colleges or universities.

== Buildings ==
Cushing Academy and Science Building, c. 1908.

The academic buildings include the Main Building (completed in 1875, and following a fire, a new building was dedicated in 1894), the Joseph R. Curry Academic Center, the English Building, and the Emily Fisher Landau Center for Visual Arts. Ashburnham House and Alumni Hall are the largest student dormitories. Sports facilities include the Watkins Field House, Heslin Gym, Theodore Iorio Arena, and several athletic fields and tennis courts.

Lowe Hall, built in 1890 as a dormitory for female students, was named for board of trustees member Abraham T. Lowe. Lore has it that Bette Davis, who lived in Lowe, carved her name into a closet. Lowe was most recently remodeled in 2015.

== Academics ==
Cushing offers courses in classical and modern languages, computer science, English, history and social science, mathematics, performing arts, visual arts, and support services such as English as a second language and academic support. Cushing sponsors an annual common read. In 2009, Cushing's library was one of the first school libraries to move to an all digital collection, however in 2014 the library returned to acquiring both print and digital resources.

== Athletics ==
Sports have been an important part of life at Cushing since the early years of the school. In 1876, the first baseball game was played at Cushing. Cushing formed a boys' basketball team in 1897 and a girls' team the next year.

Cushing has a long hockey tradition that began in the early 1900s, though the boys' team in its present form has only been around since the 1980s. The boys' hockey team was formed in 1924 and the girls' team in 1995.

Cushing alumni include a number of professional or Olympic hockey players. The boys' varsity hockey team has won two New England Elite championships, 21 in-season tournament championships, and one Martin/Earl tournament title in the large-school division.

As of 2018, Cushing has dozens of teams in the following sports: cross country, field hockey, soccer, skiing, football, volleyball, basketball, ice hockey, baseball, golf, lacrosse, softball, tennis, and track & field.

Cushing is a member of the New England Preparatory School Athletic Council.

== Extracurricular activities ==
Clubs and organizations at Cushing include A Cappella, Art Club, Black Student Union, Classical Music Club, Debate Club, E-News Club, Film Club, International Club, Kindness Club, Math Club, Model United Nations, and Pride.

The student newspaper, The Breeze, has been published since 1888. The student yearbook, The Penguin, has been published since 1933.

Cushing's annual Mountain Day tradition began in 1926 in honor of Cowell, the third principal. Mountain Day was started by James W. Vose, Cowell's successor. On Mountain Day, which traditionally takes place in late September, the Cushing community goes to Mount Monadnock for a day of walking. During World War II, Mountain Day was held at the nearer Mount Watatic for a few years due to gas rationing.

Another tradition is the Winter Carnival. The first carnival, in 1921, was an athletic competition. The modern winter carnival has some outdoor events, but also indoor events such as cupcake decorating.

== Notable alumni ==
See List of Cushing Academy alumni.

== Notable faculty and staff ==
- Ray Bourque, coach
- Tracey DeKeyser, coach
- Sturgis Elleno Leavitt, faculty
- Richard Whitney, faculty

== Principals, headmasters, and heads of school ==
- Cushing Academy's 13 leaders have had the titles of principal, headmaster, and head of school.
  1. Edwin Pierce (1875-1879): first principal
  2. James E. Vose (1879-1887): principal
  3. Hervey S. Cowell (1887–1926): principal
  4. James W. Vose (1926-1933): last principal; son of the second principal
  5. Clarence Quimby (1933-1956): first with title of "headmaster"
  6. Ralph O. West (1956-1960): headmaster
  7. Howard Baker (1961-1963): headmaster
  8. Bradford Lamson (1963-1972): headmaster
  9. Joseph Curry (1972-2000): headmaster
  10. Willard Lampe (2000-2006): headmaster
  11. James Tracy (2006-2013): first with title of "head of school"
  12. Christopher Torino (2013-2016): last with the title of "headmaster"
    - Margaret Lee and Catherine Pollock (2017-2018): interim co-heads of school
  13. Randy Bertin: head of school (2018–Present)
