= David J. Hanson =

American sociologist (born 1941)

David Justin Hanson (born 1941) is an American sociologist and professor emeritus of sociology at the State University of New York at Potsdam. He has written on alcohol, drinking and alcohol policy since his doctoral research, and is the author of two books on the subject. Since 1997 he has written and edited Alcohol Problems and Solutions, a website on alcohol issues.

== Academic career ==
Beginning in the early 1980s, Hanson conducted a series of national surveys of drinking among American college students, frequently in collaboration with Ruth C. Engs of Indiana University. Papers from this work appeared in journals including the Journal of Criminal Justice, Psychological Reports and the British Journal of Addiction.

Hanson is the author of Preventing Alcohol Abuse: Alcohol, Culture and Control (Praeger, 1995) and Alcohol Education: What We Must Do (Praeger, 1996). The former was reviewed in Choice and in the International Journal of Comparative Sociology.

== Views on alcohol policy ==
Hanson has argued that moderate alcohol consumption is associated with health benefits, and has been quoted to that effect in general-interest health journalism.

He is a critic of organisations that advocate reducing overall alcohol consumption as the means of addressing alcohol problems, and describes them as "neo-prohibitionist".

Writing about what he calls the persistence of a "temperance mentality" after the repeal of National Prohibition, Hanson states that the tactic of such groups "is to establish cultural rather than strictly legal prohibition by making alcohol beverages less socially acceptable and marginalizing those who drink, no matter how moderately".

A critic of the minimum legal drinking age of 21 in the United States, Hanson has proposed drinking learner permits for adults under that age, analogous to driving learner permits. He set out this argument in a 2004 article co-written with Matt Walcoff for Reason.

He has also argued that there is no reliable evidence linking alcohol advertising to alcohol abuse, a position cited in coverage of lawsuits brought against alcohol producers over their advertising.

== Websites ==
Hanson writes and edits three websites on alcohol: Alcohol Problems and Solutions, Alcohol Facts and Find Alcoholism Help. The disclaimer on Alcohol Problems and Solutions states that the site "receives no support, directly or indirectly, from any person or entity associated with the production, distribution, advertisement or sale of alcoholic beverages", and that funding to establish it came from SUNY Potsdam, the College Foundation of SUNY Potsdam and Gene Ford, with continuing support from SUNY Potsdam.

== Selected publications ==
=== Books ===
- Preventing Alcohol Abuse: Alcohol, Culture and Control. Westport, Connecticut: Praeger, 1995. ISBN 0-275-94926-5
- Alcohol Education: What We Must Do. Westport, Connecticut: Praeger, 1996. ISBN 0-275-95561-3

=== Book chapters ===
- "Historical Evolution of Alcohol Consumption in Society". In Boyle, Peter, et al. (eds.), Alcohol: Science, Policy and Public Health. Oxford: Oxford University Press, 2013.
- "The Effects of Substances on Driving". In Miller, Peter (ed.), Principles of Addiction: Comprehensive Addictive Behaviors and Disorders, vol. 1. Amsterdam: Elsevier Academic Press, 2013.
- "Congressional Temperance Society". In Martin, Scott C., et al. (eds.), Alcohol: Social, Cultural, and Historical Perspectives. Thousand Oaks, California: Sage Reference, 2015.
- "Alcoholics Anonymous (AA)". In Barnett, George A. (ed.), Encyclopedia of Social Networks. Thousand Oaks, California: Sage, 2011.
