= Henson Branch =

Stream in the American state of Missouri

Coordinates: 37.4839448°N 90.0803877°W

Henson Branch is a stream in Bollinger County in the U.S. state of Missouri.

Henson Branch has the name of William Henson, a local landowner.

== See also ==
- List of rivers of Missouri
