= Lys Hansen =

Scottish artist

- Born: 1936 (age 89–90); Falkirk, Scotland
- Website: https://www.lyshansen.co.uk/

Lys Hansen (born 1936) is a Scottish artist regarded as one of the country's most important figurative expressionist painters. She currently lives and works in Braco, Perthshire.

== Early life and education ==
Hansen was born in Falkirk and grew up in Alloa. Hansen studied at Edinburgh College of Art from 1955 to 1959 before continuing to attend the University of Edinburgh where she studied fine art in 1961. After studying art, Hansen trained as a teacher. She has travelled and worked across Europe, including to France, the Netherlands, Ireland, Germany and Denmark.

== Career ==
Hansen was working in Berlin when the Berlin Wall came down, greatly impacting her creative direction. Her work is often considered introspective and challenging. Often working in paint, Hansen explores the human condition in her work. Having previously exhibited her paintings, Hansen exhibited her drawings for the first time in 2012. A sculpture in wood by Hansen formed part of an exhibition at the Kunsthuis Gallery, Yorkshire, in 2016.

Hansen is recognised for her work in supporting other artists. Her work has also inspired the poem Warpaint And Womanflesh by Scottish writer and Scots Makar, Liz Lochhead.

Hansen was the subject of the book, Passionate Paint: The Art of Lys Hansen, published by Mainstream Publishing Ltd in 1998.

Hansen is a past president and current member of the Society of Scottish Artists.

=== Selected exhibitions ===
- Lys Hansen Solo, Third Eye Centre, Glasgow, February 1984
- Camden Arts Centre, 1986
- Relatively Close, Bornholm Kunst Museum, Denmark, 2007
- The Other Side: Karin Christiansen and Lys Hansen, Collins Gallery, University Of Strathclyde, 8 July–16 August 2008
- Relatively Closer, University of Stirling, Scotland, 2009
- Drawing Breath, Cooper Gallery, University of Dundee, 2–30 March 2012
- When You Reach September, Kinblethmont Gallery, Arbroath, 2012
- Love + War + Paint, The Lillie Art Gallery, Milngavie, 12 July–24 September 2014

=== Selected awards and recognition ===
- Post-graduate scholarship, Edinburgh College of Art
- Scottish Arts Council scholarship awarded in 1985
- Abbey Minor Award, Prix de Rome, British School at Rome
- President of the Society of Scottish Artists, 1992–1995

=== Works in public collections ===
Pieces by Hansen are held in several public collections, including the following works,

Title	Year	Medium	Gallery no.	Gallery	Location
Act I Scene II (Duet)	1987	oil & pastel on paper	2009.1	University of Stirling	Scotland
Berlin Diptych: Look and Listen (left panel)	1993	acrylic on canvas	AYRAG:001993.L	Maclaurin Art Gallery at Rozelle House	Ayr, Scotland
Berlin Diptych: Look and Listen (right panel)	1993	acrylic on canvas	AYRAG:001993.R	Maclaurin Art Gallery at Rozelle House	Ayr, Scotland
Lost Man	2003	oil & pastel on paper	2009.2	University of Stirling	Scotland
Mary, Queen of Scots	1991	oil on canvas	21056	Stirling Smith Art Gallery & Museum	Stirling, Scotland
Other Directions	2007	oil & pastel on paper	2009.1	University of Stirling	Scotland
Stagefright	1984	painting	-	New Hall Art Collection, Murray Edwards College	Cambridge, England
Stance	1983	acrylic & collage on canvas	CAC1985/17	City Art Centre	Edinburgh, Scotland
The Boatmaker's Fishgarden	1966	oil on canvas	1967.6	University of Stirling	Scotland
The Rivals - Scarsdale (Mrs Harris 1)	1982	-	-	North Ayrshire Council	Scotland
'Thou knowst thou hast made me with passions wild and strong' No. 2	1996	acrylic on paper	2007.206	Perth & Kinross Council	Scotland
