= Sir Charles Hanson, 2nd Baronet =

British Army officer and stockbroker

Sir Charles Edwin Bourne Hanson, 2nd Baronet (1874–1958) was a British Army officer and stockbroker who was High Sheriff of Cornwall in 1939.

His father was Sir Charles Augustin Hanson, who was Lord Mayor of London in 1917–18.

Hanson was an officer in the 3rd The Duke of Wellington's (West Riding Regiment), a (Militia) Battalion stationed in Halifax, Yorkshire. The battalion was embodied for service in January 1900 during the Second Boer War, and Hanson left to join the fight in South Africa on the SS Bavarian two months later. He was promoted to major on 16 August 1900.

Baronetage of the United Kingdom
Preceded by Charles Hanson	Baronet (of Fowey); 1922–1958	Succeeded by John Hanson
