= History of Irish Americans in Boston =

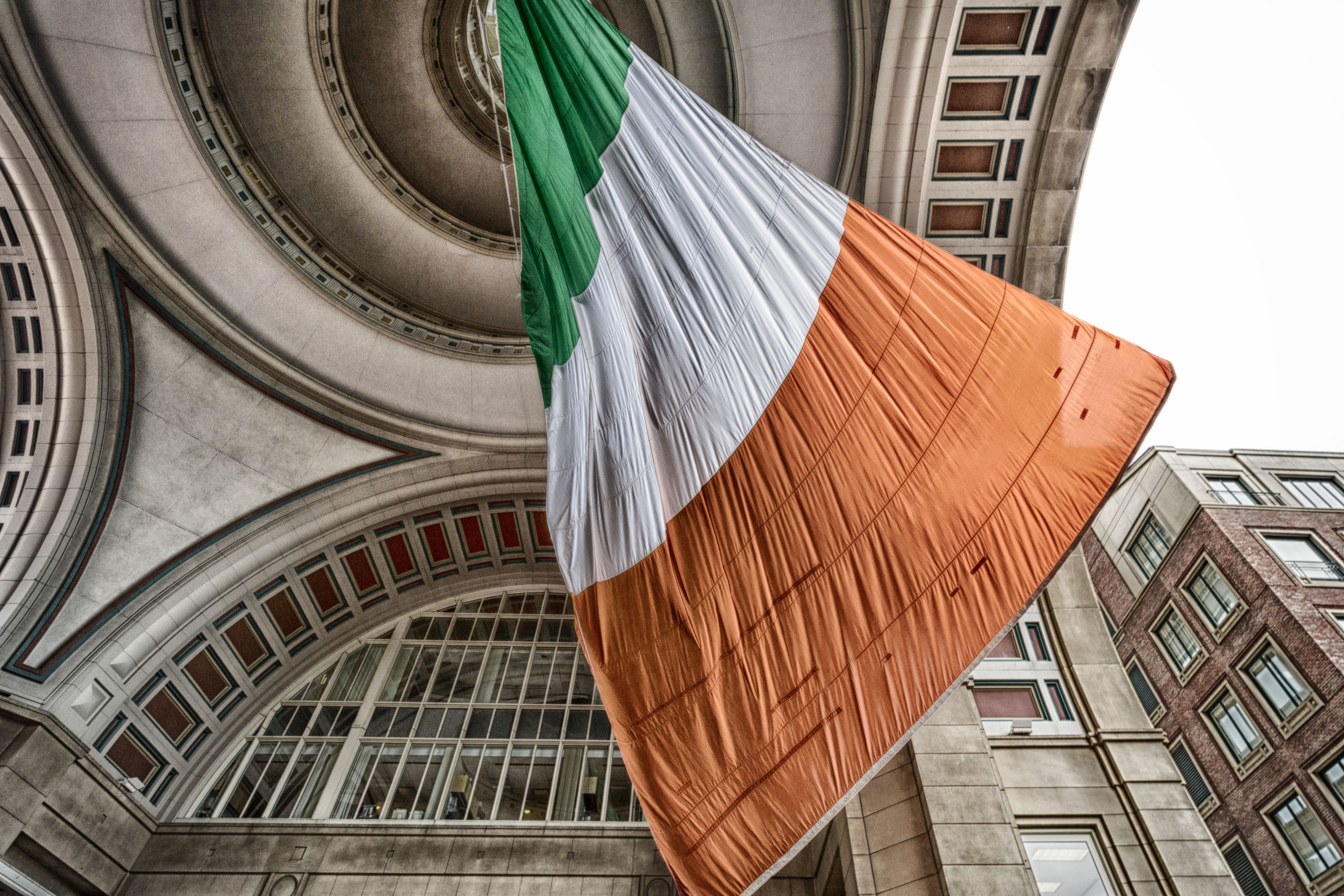
An Irish flag hanging outside the Boston Harbor Hotel

People of Irish descent form the largest single ethnic group in Massachusetts, and one of the largest in Boston. Once a Puritan stronghold, Boston changed dramatically in the 19th century with the arrival of immigrants from other parts of the world. The Irish dominated the first wave of newcomers during this period, especially following the Great Irish Famine. Their arrival transformed Boston from an Anglo-Saxon, Protestant city into one that has become progressively more diverse. These people hired Irish as workers and servants, but there was little social interaction. In the 1840s and 50s, the anti-Catholic, anti-immigrant Know Nothing movement targeted Irish Catholics in Boston. In the 1860s, many Irish immigrants fought for the Union in the American Civil War, a display of patriotism that helped to dispel much of the prejudice against them.

With an expanding population, group loyalty, and block-by-block political organization, the Irish took political control of the city, leaving the Yankees in charge of finance, business, and higher education. The Irish left their mark on the region in a number of ways: in still heavily Irish neighborhoods such as Charlestown and South Boston; in the name of the local basketball team, the Boston Celtics; in the iconic Irish-American political family, the Kennedys; in a large number of prominent local politicians, such as James Michael Curley; and in the establishment of Catholic Boston College.

== History ==
=== Early America ===
The Catholic Irish have been in Boston since colonial times, when they arrived as indentured servants, mostly women and children, as opposed to those of Ulster-Scots Protestant ancestry who were merchants, sailors, or tradesmen. According to historian James Cullen, a large number of Irish immigrants arrived as early as 1654, on the ship Goodfellow, and were "sold" into indentured servitude "to such of the inhabitants as needed them." One of those Irish may have been Ann Glover

Most of the early arrivals were Presbyterians from Ulster who came seeking relief from high rents, repressive taxes, and other pressures. Wary of Boston's Anglo-Saxon Puritans, who were hostile to the Irish, many moved to the outer fringes of the Bay Colony and founded towns such as Bangor and Belfast in Maine, and Londonderry and Derry in New Hampshire. The few Irish Catholics who settled in the Boston area had to convert or hide their identity, since Catholicism was outlawed. Other Irish immigrants may have come to Boston involuntarily, after being kidnapped by pirates. The Boston News-Letter announced an auction of Irish boys in 1730, and women convicts deported from Belfast were sold in Boston in 1749. Conflation of such immigrants, indentures, and convicts has given rise to the Irish slaves myth.

On March 17, 1737, after a particularly harsh winter, a group of Irish Protestants met in Boston to organize the Charitable Irish Society. Its mission was to provide loans and other assistance to Irish immigrants who were elderly, sick, or in need. The gathering was the first known observance of St. Patrick's Day in the Thirteen Colonies. Still in existence, the society is the oldest Irish organization in North America.

Once the Irish had proved their loyalty by fighting in the American Revolutionary War, they were more welcome in Boston and better able to assimilate, provided, of course, that they were Protestants. According to historian Michael J. O'Brien, hundreds of Irish Americans fought in the Battle of Bunker Hill despite being Protestant, since analysis of their names in the records shows them to have borne Irish surnames, derived from the Irish language. One son of Irish immigrants, John Sullivan, served under George Washington and became a brigadier general. According to local legend, Sullivan used "Saint Patrick" as the official password when he led colonial troops into town following the British evacuation of Boston in 1776. Boston still celebrates the event each year on Evacuation Day, which coincides with Saint Patrick's Day. Sullivan's brother, James Sullivan, was elected governor of Massachusetts in 1807.

=== 19th century ===
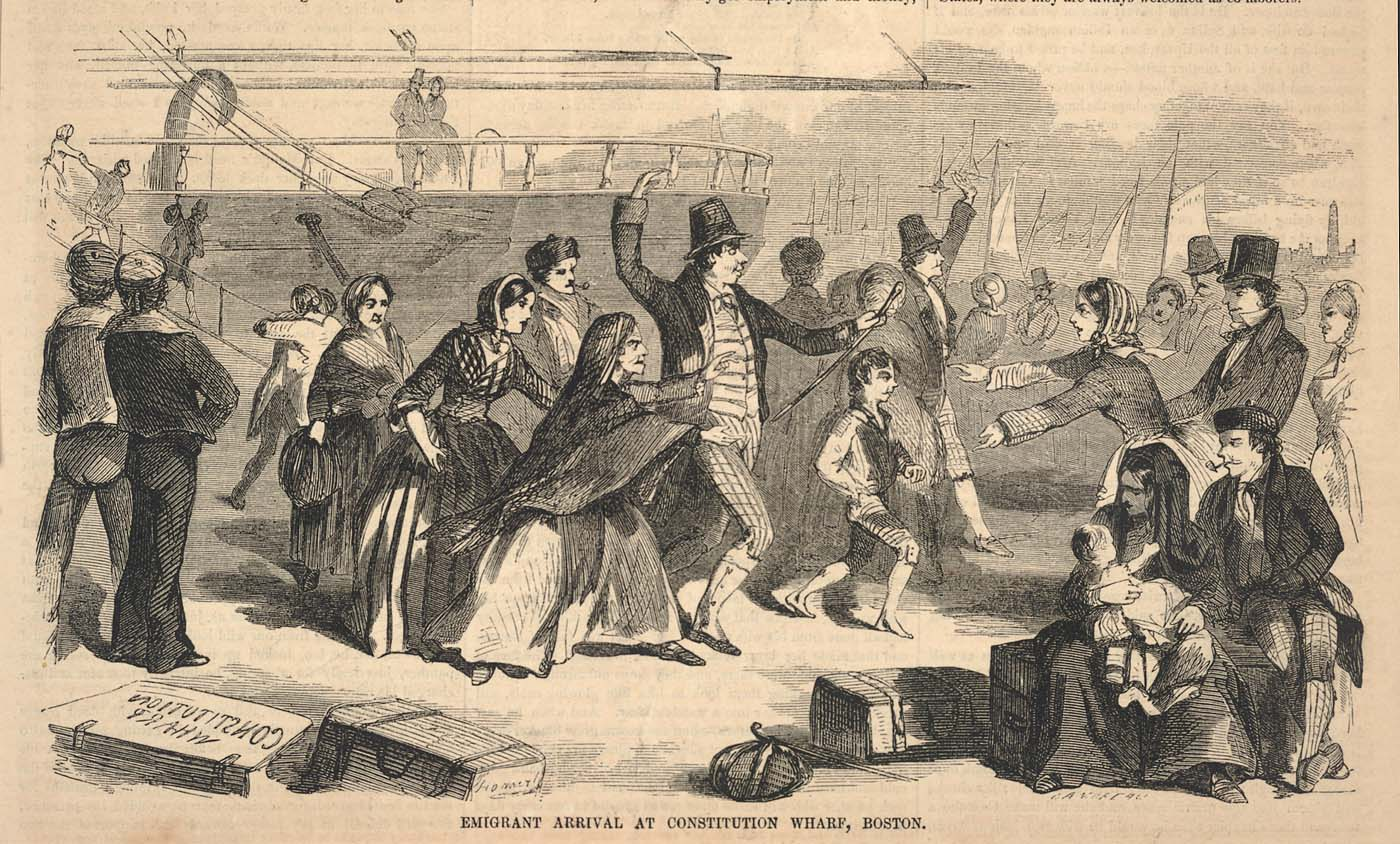
Depiction of Irish immigrants arriving at Constitution Wharf, Boston, 1857

A wave of Irish immigration to Boston started in the 1820s. Initially, most of the newcomers were Protestants, but increasingly, they were joined by Catholics. From the start, there were problems. The "papists" were seen as both a spiritual and a political threat, and the locals reacted accordingly. Gangs of militant Protestants roamed the streets of Irish neighborhoods, damaged property, and even destroyed several houses. Preachers railed from the pulpit against the "blasphemy" and "idolatry" of Roman Catholicism, and local newspapers fanned the flames by printing anti-Catholic propaganda, filled with wild conspiracy theories about the Jesuits.

On July 11, 1837, a company of Yankee firemen returning from a call met with an Irish funeral procession on Broad Street. What started as a street brawl escalated into an all-out riot when a fireman sounded the emergency alarm, summoning all of the fire engines in Boston. Local Yankees and Irish Americans came running to join the fight, bearing sticks, stones, bricks, and cudgels. Some 800 men were involved in the actual fighting, and at least 10,000 gathered in the street to cheer them on. The riot ended when the mayor called in the National Lancers and the state militia. Remarkably, no one was killed. Three Irishmen and none of the firemen received jail sentences. The incident became known as the Broad Street Riot.

==== Famine years ====
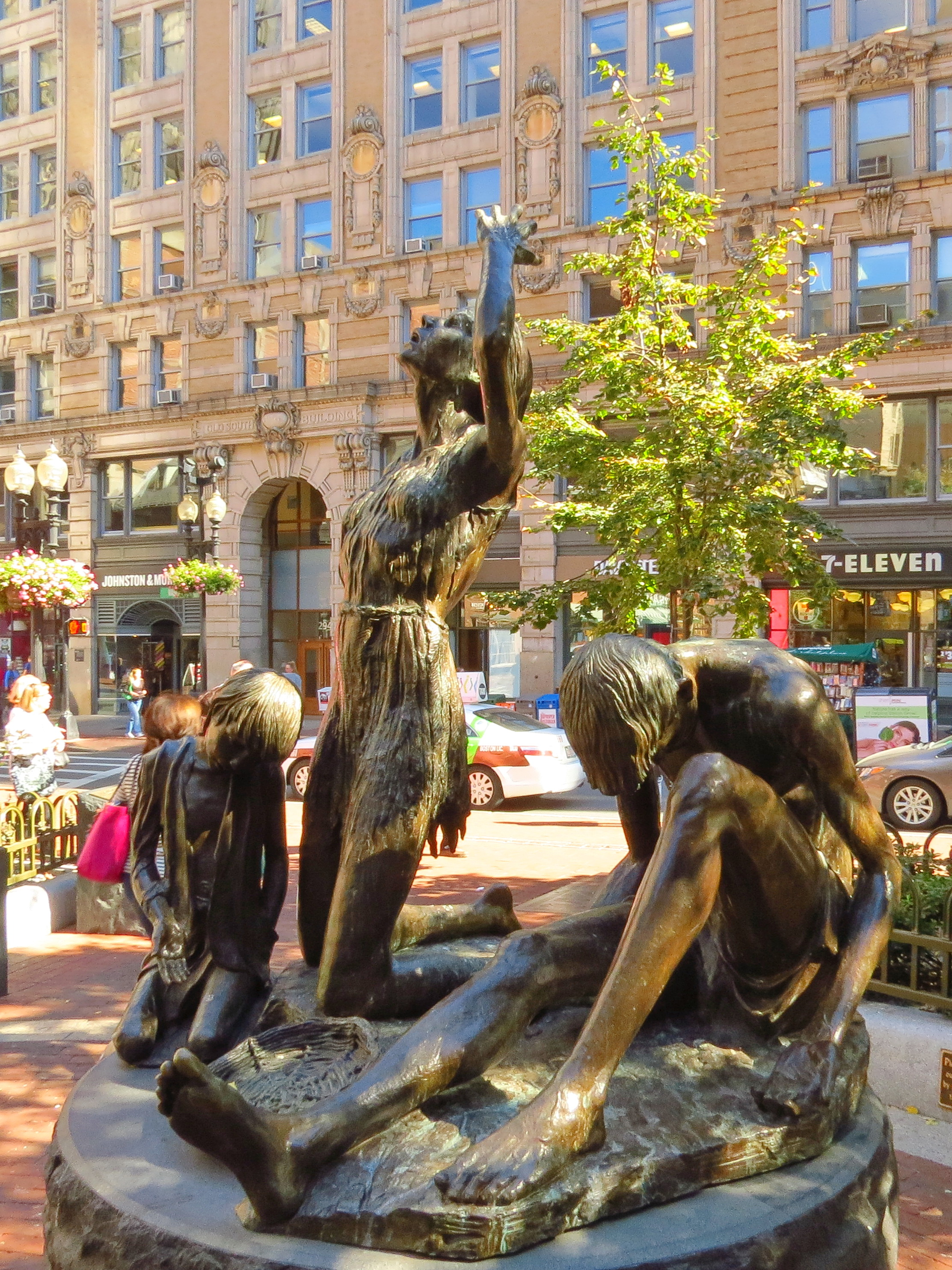
Boston Irish Famine Memorial

The Port of Boston was a major center of immigration during the Great Irish Famine (1845–1852). By 1850, the Irish were the largest ethnic group in Boston. Most of the immigrants during this period were poor, unskilled laborers from rural backgrounds who settled in the slums of the North End, the South Cove, and Fort Hill. Many were not only destitute but weakened by typhus contracted on the coffin ships that had brought them. To contain the health risk, a quarantine hospital and an almshouse were built on Deer Island, where hundreds of immigrants died and were buried in unmarked graves. To make matters worse, a cholera epidemic swept through Boston in 1849. The North End's poor, who lived in crowded, unsanitary conditions on the waterfront, were the hardest hit, and over 500 Irish died. Boston health inspectors described a typical Irish slum as "a perfect hive of human beings, without comforts and mostly without common necessaries; in many cases huddled together like brutes, without regard to age or sex or sense of decency."

Many Irish women became domestic servants; by 1860, two-thirds of the servants in Boston were Irish. Most Irish men worked in construction, in quarries, or on the docks. Irish laborers helped build up the business district behind Faneuil Hall, built townhouses on Beacon Hill, cleared land for North Station, and filled in the South End; others worked on the waterfront as fish cutters and stevedores.

A notable exception was Andrew Carney. Born into poverty in County Cavan, Ireland, he trained as a tailor's apprentice, moved to Boston in 1816, and opened a successful tailoring business. Carney & Sleeper, Clothier, was one of the first shops to offer "ready-made" suits. After selling the business, Carney retired from tailoring and went on to a career in finance and a legacy of philanthropy. He co-founded the First National Bank of Boston and the John Hancock Insurance Company; funded the Church of the Immaculate Conception in the South End, and several Catholic orphanages; helped found Boston College; and in 1863 founded Carney Hospital, where, he insisted, "the sick without distinction of creed, color or nation shall be received and cared for." This policy was relatively enlightened at a time when Boston City Hospital was refusing to admit Jewish patients.

Another influential figure was Thomas F. Ring, president of the St. Vincent de Paul Society and the Catholic Union of Boston. A Boston native of Irish descent, Ring worked for his family's paper export business and was a leading member of several charitable organizations. Ring was also involved in the founding, in 1870, of the Union Institution for Savings, which provided loans to Catholics who were turned away by other banks. Other successful Irish businessmen included Christopher Blake, who started a large furniture factory in Dorchester; Patrick Maguire, founder of The Republic, a weekly political journal; and Dennis Hern, founder of a telegram service that employed 400 messengers.

The Boston Irish Famine Memorial was erected at the corner of Washington and School Streets, on the Freedom Trail, in 1998. One bronze sculpture depicts a starving woman, looking up to the heavens as if to ask, "Why?", while her children cling to her. A second sculpture shows the figures hopeful as they land in Boston.

==== Know Nothings ====
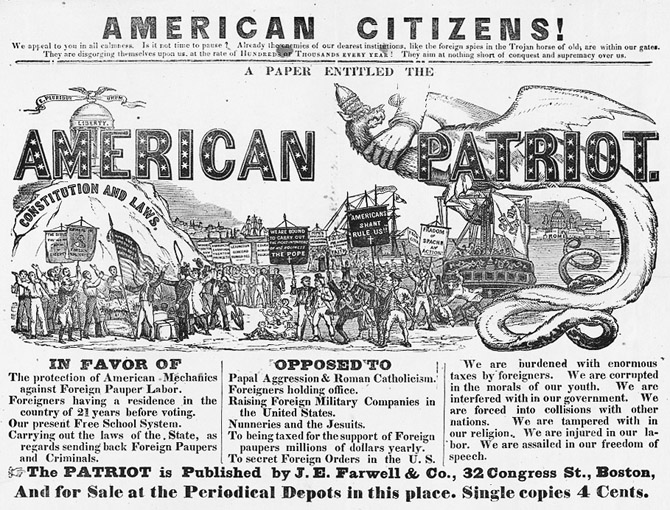
Nativist, anti-Catholic paper published in Boston ca. 1854

In the 1840s and 50s, increasing nativist and anti-Catholic sentiment gave rise to the Know Nothing movement, formally known as the Native American Party and later the American Party. The Know Nothings gained a large following in Boston with their program of "Temperance, Liberty, and Protestantism." In 1847, they held a mass rally in the crowded Irish neighborhood of Fort Hill; residents, forewarned by the clergy and urged to keep the peace, stayed indoors that day.

In 1854, the Know Nothings took control of the Massachusetts legislature. Among other things, they passed laws barring Catholics from being buried in public cemeteries, denying church officials any control over church property, and requiring children to read from the Protestant Bible (the King James Version) in public schools. They formed a Nunnery Committee that raided Catholic schools and convents on trumped-up pretexts. The Boston Police Department's first Irish officer, Bernard "Barney" McGinniskin, was fired that year without cause, and on Independence Day, the newly constructed St. Gregory's Church in Dorchester was burned to the ground by Know Nothing rioters.

In Boston's public schools, Catholic children were required to say Protestant prayers and sing Protestant hymns, and their history books were written from an anti-Catholic point of view. In 1859, a Catholic boy who refused to recite the Protestant version of the Ten Commandments was severely beaten, leading to the Eliot School Rebellion. Over 300 boys withdrew from the school, which prompted St. Mary's Parish to create a primary school to educate them.

==== Civil War ====
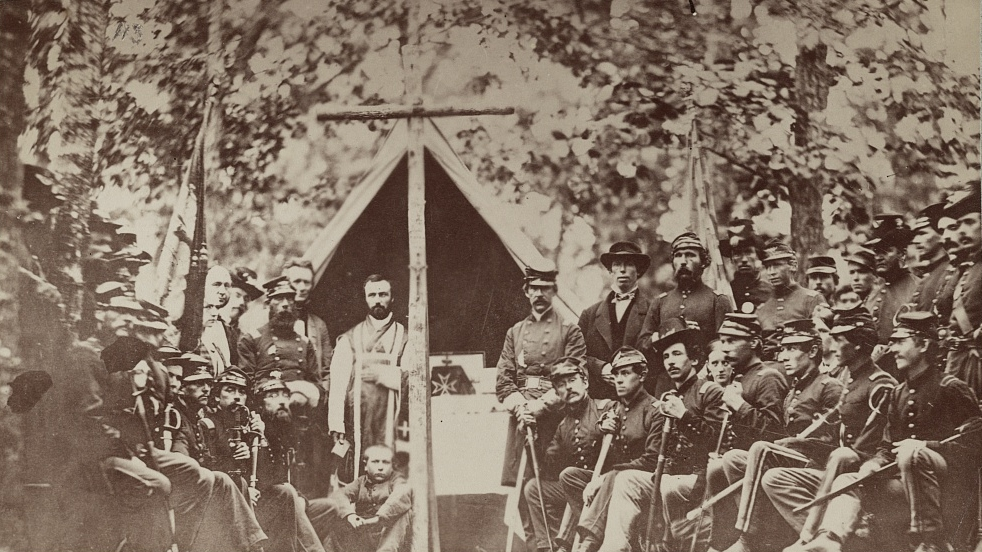
Massachusetts 9th Regiment at Camp Cass, Virginia, 1861

Although Boston was an important center of abolitionism, most Irish immigrants were strongly opposed to blacks and to abolitionists. Historian Brian Kelly says, "Though they were neither consistent stalwarts of the northern war effort nor pure-and-simple dupes of the slavocracy, the Irish were capable both of ardent support and sacrifices for the Union cause and of vicious hatred for the "n*****s" and his/her abolitionist sympathizers." Many fought for the Union, including Colonel Thomas Cass, who commanded an Irish regiment, the Fighting Ninth; and Patrick Robert Guiney, who fought in over thirty engagements. Sister Mary Anthony O'Connell served as a nurse on the front lines, where she was known as the "Angel of the Battlefield." Irish Bostonians also contributed to the war effort by working in the Watertown arsenal and the iron foundries of South Boston, or in the shipyards, building warships for the navy. However, as in New York City, on July 14, 1863, a draft riot attempting to raid Union armories broke out among Irish Catholics in the North End, resulting in approximately 8 to 14 deaths. In the 1860 presidential election, Boston Irish Catholics mostly voted against Abraham Lincoln. The critical factor among the Irish, according to Kelly, was the powerful role of the Catholic Church. He states:

The basic conservatism of the Catholic hierarchy, which had previously led it to attack abolitionists for challenging the existing social order was, after Sumter, turned against the Confederacy....Lay Catholics, according to the Church, were to answer the Union call to arms, not out of anti-slavery zeal, but out of "loyal submission to legitimate rule."

By 1870, Boston had 250,000 residents, 56,900 of whom were Irish. Around this time several powerful Irish ward bosses appeared on the scene, including Martin Lomasney in the West End, John F. Fitzgerald in the North End, and P. J. Kennedy in East Boston. Though often depicted as ruthless and corrupt, ward bosses provided much-needed aid to their neighbors. As Lomasney put it, "The great mass of people are interested in only three things—food, clothing, and shelter. A politician in a district like mine sees to it that his people get these things." That approach to politics, known as the patronage system, helped the Irish climb out of poverty. Early in Lomasney's career, he and his brother Joseph founded the Hendricks Club. The Hendricks began as a social club and gathering place but later turned into the center of Lomasney's political machine. It was from here that he began to provide social services, charity, and shelter for poor immigrants. In return, he was able to drum up votes and support for candidates of his choosing. Partly through his influence, Boston elected its first Irish mayor, Hugh O'Brien, in 1884.

As Irish Americans began to gain political power, there was a resurgence of anti-Catholic nativism. Groups such as the American Protective Association (APA), the Immigration Restriction League, and Loyal Women of American Liberty were active in Boston. The APA introduced legislation aimed at disaccrediting local Catholic schools, while other groups focused on purging Catholics from the School Committee. Area Catholics responded by founding as many Catholic schools (such as St. Augustine's in South Boston, founded in 1895) as their limited resources allowed.

By the end of the century, the city's core neighborhoods had become enclaves of ethnically distinct immigrants; the Irish dominated South Boston and Charlestown.

=== 20th century ===
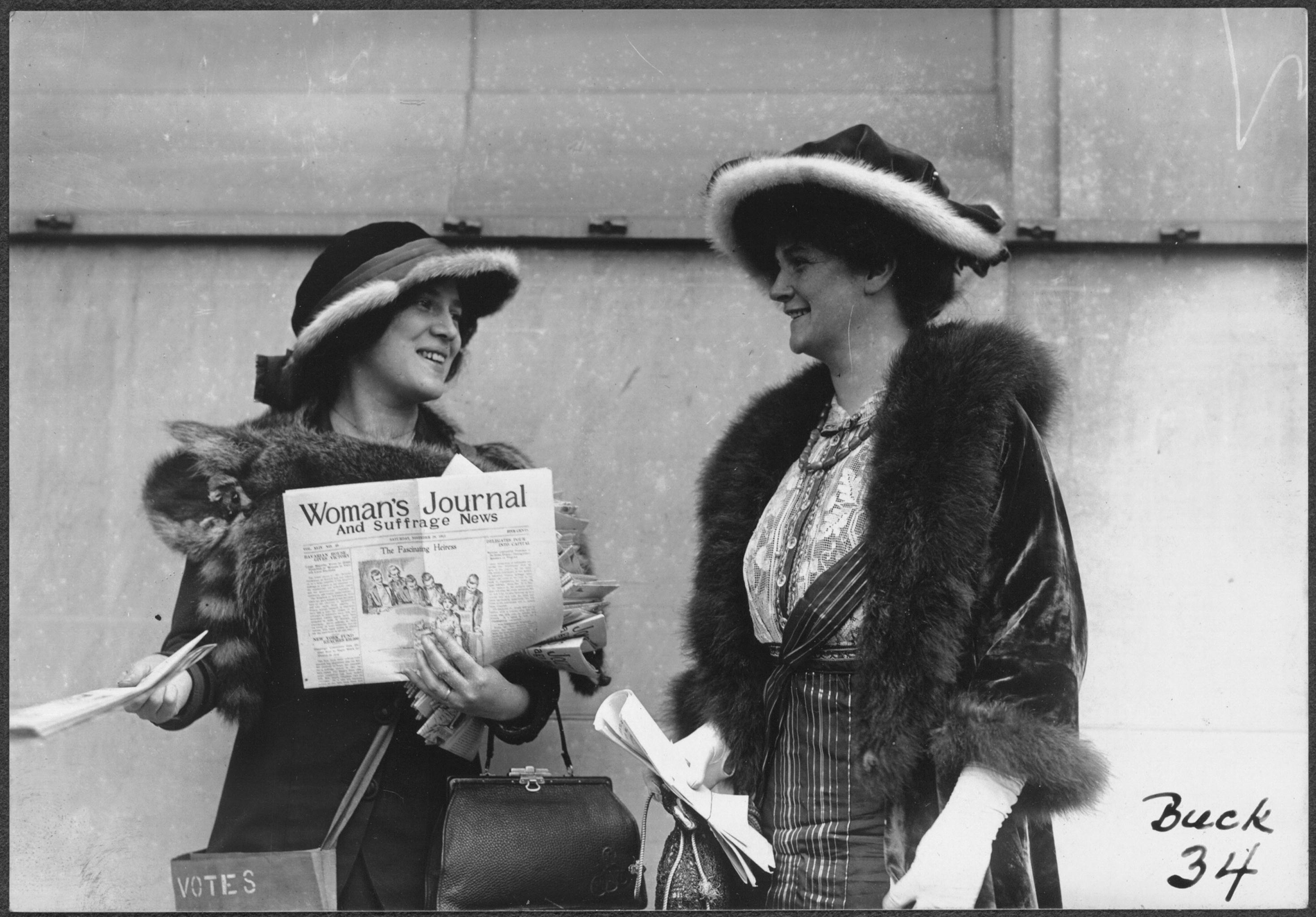
Margaret Foley (right) and another suffragist distribute the Woman's Journal, 1913

In the early 20th century, Boston's Irish Americans were successful in Democratic Party politics and the labor movement but were relatively slow to break into business and the professions. That was only partly because of discrimination against them, although that was certainly a factor. For cultural reasons, they gravitated to modest positions offering job security and pensions, rather than high-risk business ventures. Many became schoolteachers, police officers, firefighters, nurses, librarians, custodians, and clerks. Historian Dennis P. Ryan calls them "occupationally nearsighted."

Few Irish women in Boston were active in the suffrage movement, which was dominated by upper-class women. Margaret Foley of Dorchester was a rare exception. Known for confronting anti-suffrage candidates at political rallies, she was nicknamed the "Grand Heckler." Most working-class women were more interested in labor issues: Mary Kenney O'Sullivan helped found the Women's Trade Union League in 1903, and was a leader of the Lawrence textile strike in 1912; Julia O'Connor led a successful telephone operators' strike in 1919 that paralyzed telephone service across New England for six days. That same year, the Boston Police went on strike for better wages and working conditions. Most of the officers who subsequently lost their jobs were Irish Catholics, while most of those who condemned the strikers were "old-line Protestant Yankees". Many of the strikebreakers were students at Harvard University.

During this period, the Irish often clashed with the Italians, although the vast majority of both groups shared a common religion and political party. Thousands of Irish immigrants who had settled in Boston's North End in the 19th century, and displaced the Yankee residents, were crowded out by Italians in the early 20th century. The two groups were in competition for jobs as well as housing, and cultural differences, including different styles of Catholic worship, caused additional friction. For a time, in some Irish parishes, Italians were forced to attend Mass in the basement.

==== Leading politicians ====
The most prominent figure in Boston politics in the early 20th century was John F. Fitzgerald, a man so well known for his charming personality that he was nicknamed "Honey Fitz". During his two terms as mayor, Fitzgerald made major improvements to the Port of Boston, an investment that brought increased traffic from Europe. Perhaps more significantly, in his later years, he taught his grandchildren how to succeed in politics. One of them, John F. Kennedy, would go on to become the 35th president of the United States.

Fitzgerald was succeeded as mayor by another charismatic Irish American, James Michael Curley. Fatherless at the age of ten, Curley left school to help support his family while his mother scrubbed floors in downtown office buildings. He had a natural flair for public speaking, which he deliberately honed, studying the speeches of famous orators in the Boston Public Library. By 1900, he was Boston's youngest ward boss. He went on to serve three terms in Congress, four terms as mayor, and a term as Governor of Massachusetts. He also spent time in prison for fraud. The city's elites saw him as unforgivably corrupt, but he was well-loved by Boston's poor. During the Great Depression, he enlarged Boston City Hospital, expanded the subway system, funded projects to improve the roads and bridges, and improved the neighborhoods with beaches and bathhouses, playgrounds and parks, public schools and libraries. Among the many local legends about Curley, perhaps the most telling is his ordering long-handled mops for the cleaning women at City Hall so they would not have to be on their knees. According to City Councilman Fred Langone, Curley was more popular with the newer immigrants, such as Italians and Jews, than he was with the lace-curtain Irish of Jamaica Plain, West Roxbury, and Hyde Park.

Historian James M. O'Toole has argued:

Surely there has been no more flamboyant political personality than James Michael Curley, who dominated politics in Boston for half a century. Whether as incumbent or as candidate, he was always there: alderman, congressman, mayor, governor. People loved him or hated him, but they could not ignore him. He mastered the politics of ethnic and class warfare by defining a manichaean world of "us" versus "them"... He presided over state and city during the challenge of the Depression, leaving behind impressive monuments in stone and public works. In the end, he even managed to enter American political mythology, remembered as much in his fictional incarnations as for his real life.

Urban historian Kenneth T. Jackson argued:

Curley was among the best-known and most colorful of the big-city, paternalistic bosses, Irish, Catholic, and Democratic... Capitalizing on Irish-American resentment against the Republican, Harvard-educated Brahmans who dominated Boston's social and economic life, Curley liked to think of himself as "Mayor of the Poor"... Curley helped immigrants to adjust to urban life by finding them jobs, easing their troubles with the law, building them playgrounds and public baths, and attending their weddings and wakes... Because his feuds with fellow Irish chieftains like John (Honey Fitz) Fitzgerald, Patrick Kennedy, and Martin Lomasney were legendary, he tried as mayor to centralize patronage and make the ward healer obsolete. During the depression, he used federal relief and work projects as a tool of his political ambitions. But Curley never built a really solid organization in Boston and never enjoyed the power or statewide influence of other well-known urban bosses.

==== Depression and World War II ====
During World War II, there was an outbreak of antisemitic violence in Boston. Jewish residents, businesses, and synagogues were frequent targets of what would now be called hate crimes: gangs of mostly Irish Catholic youths, incited by Father Coughlin and the Christian Front, roamed the streets of Jewish neighborhoods, vandalizing property and assaulting residents. Several victims were seriously injured with blackjacks and brass knuckles. Boston's predominantly Irish police, politicians, and clergy were of little help, and the local press largely ignored the problem. Mayor Curley once proudly proclaimed Boston "the strongest Coughlin city in the world." Another Irish Catholic, Frances Sweeney, led protests against the Christian Front and similar groups.

Despite Coughlin's popularity with Boston's Irish Catholics, South Boston residents overwhelmingly voted against William Lemke, Coughlin's candidate in the 1936 presidential election.

==== Exodus to the suburbs ====
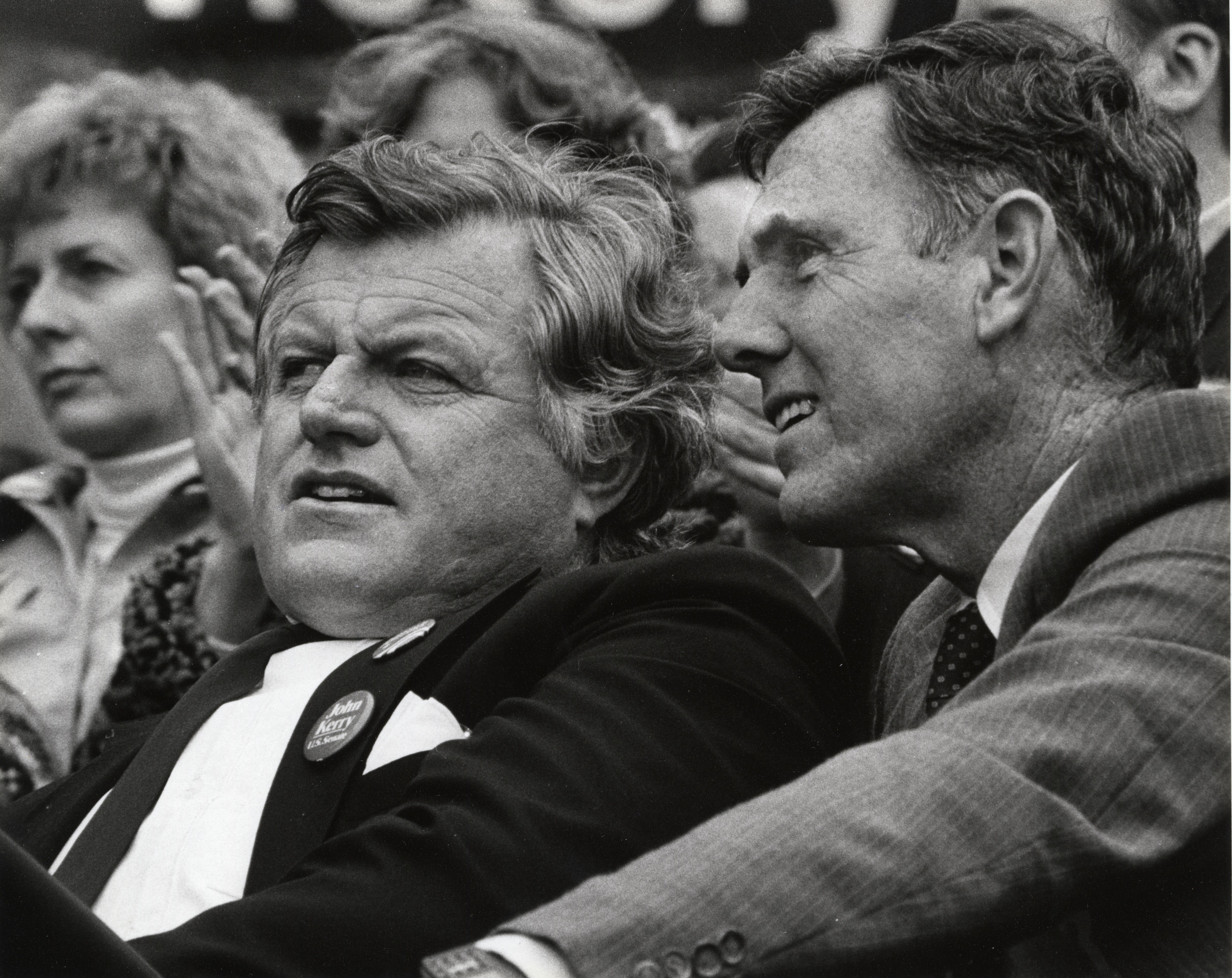
Senator Edward M. Kennedy and Mayor Raymond L. Flynn, ca. 1984.

After 1945, a large-scale movement to the suburbs was made possible by the steady upward social mobility of the Irish.

Boston's politics changed after the war. New Deal legislation and federal programs such as the G.I. Bill made the local patronage system obsolete. Mayor John Hynes got along better with business leaders than Curley had, while Cardinal Cushing reached out to other religious communities. The election of President John F. Kennedy was a source of great pride to Boston's Irish Americans and marked a turning point in their "political consciousness." A succession of Irish mayors (Hynes, John F. Collins, and Kevin White) pushed urban renewal projects that contributed to gentrification. As immigrant families assimilated and their children moved to the suburbs, Boston's neighborhoods began to lose their ethnic identities.

Irish Americans in Boston responded with alarm to news reports of the Troubles in Northern Ireland, and NORAID set up a chapter in the city to raise funds for the families of dead or imprisoned Provisional Irish Republican Army members. IRA supporters in the U.S. tended to be politically far to the right of the IRA members themselves. In the early 1970s, Bernadette Devlin offended IRA supporters in Boston when she said she felt more comfortable with black people in Roxbury than with the Irish in South Boston. Boston's Irish Catholics tended to be socially conservative, with little interest in civil rights, opposition to the Vietnam War, and feminist movements.

In the 1970s, many of the city's remaining working-class Irish residents became embroiled in the Boston busing desegregation. To combat the de facto segregation of Boston's public schools, federal judge W. Arthur Garrity Jr. ruled that students had to be bused between the white and the black areas of the city. South Boston High School was the site of many of the most vocal and violent protests. Senator Ted Kennedy supported Garrity's ruling, but Raymond Flynn, then serving on the state legislature representing South Boston, opposed it. The plan ultimately led to an increase in the dropout rate and to a wave of white flight to the suburbs and private schools. Meanwhile, local crime boss Whitey Bulger took advantage of the chaos and tightened his grip on South Boston. Irish American public figures were prominent on both sides of the issue, and surveys during the 1960s and the 1970s found Irish Americans divided on the issue. Although many Irish Americans opposed busing, as a group, they were more sympathetic to the aims of the civil rights movement than most other white ethnic groups in the country.

In 1992, the Irish-American Gay, Lesbian, and Bisexual Group of Boston (GLIB) was barred from marching in the city-sponsored St. Patrick's Day parade in South Boston. The group filed suit, and the case made it as far as the Supreme Court, which ruled against them in 1995.

=== 21st century ===
The Irish no longer dominate Boston politics like before and are not reliably Democratic, unlike in the 1980s. However, in Massachusetts and elsewhere in Southern New England, significant majorities of the local Irish stayed with the Democratic Party. That differs from other areas like Metropolitan New York and Illinois, where the Irish vote barely differs from the general white vote, and some heavily Irish small towns in Northern New England, where it is quite Republican, but it is similar to some other places like Gloucester Township, New Jersey, and Butte, Montana, which retain strongly liberal and Democratic-leaning Irish populations.

The voting intentions of Irish Americans and other white ethnic groups attracted attention in the 2016 US election. In the Democratic primaries, Boston's Irish were said to break strongly for Hillary Clinton, whose victories in Irish-heavy Boston suburbs may have helped her narrowly carry the state over Bernie Sanders. A March 2016 survey by Irish Central showed that 45% of Irish Americans nationwide supported Trump, although the majority of those in Massachusetts supported Hillary Clinton. The presence of supporters of Trump among Irish and Italian communities, which had once themselves been marginalized immigrants, generated controversy, with Irish American and Italian American politicians and journalists admonishing their co-ethnics against "myopia" and "amnesia." An October poll by Buzzfeed showed that Irish respondents nationwide split nearly evenly between Trump (40%) and Clinton (39%), with large numbers either undecided or supporting other candidates (21%), and that the Irish were more supportive of Clinton than other Western European-descended Americans, including fellow Catholic Italian Americans. In early November 2016, six days before the election, another poll by Irish Central showed Clinton ahead at 52% among Irish Americans, while Trump was at 40% and the third-party candidates together had 8%; Irish respondents in Massachusetts similarly favored Clinton by a majority. In the official 2016 election results, Irish-heavy Boston suburbs, including the South Shore, witnessed swings to the left (Scituate: +19.5% D, Cohasset: +32.8% D, Milton: +26.6% D, etc.) even as the country as a whole moved right. This caused many of the most heavily Irish-descended communities in the country, such as Scituate, to flip from split or Republican-voting to Democrat-voting by significant margins (Scituate: +18% D, Hull: +21% D, Cohasset: +24% D, Milton: +41% D). Despite voting against Trump, many of these same communities had some of the highest levels of opposition to the legalization of marijuana, a typically socially conservative position.

The Catholic Church no longer has as much influence as before over Irish Americans in Boston. However, Boston has not entirely lost its regional Irish identity: the city remains a popular destination for Irish immigrants, students, and businesses. South Boston still holds an annual St. Patrick's Day parade, Boston College offers an Irish Studies program, and organizations such as the Irish Cultural Centre help to maintain a connection with Ireland. In 2013, Boston elected a first-generation Irish-American mayor, Marty Walsh.

== Culture ==
=== Religion ===
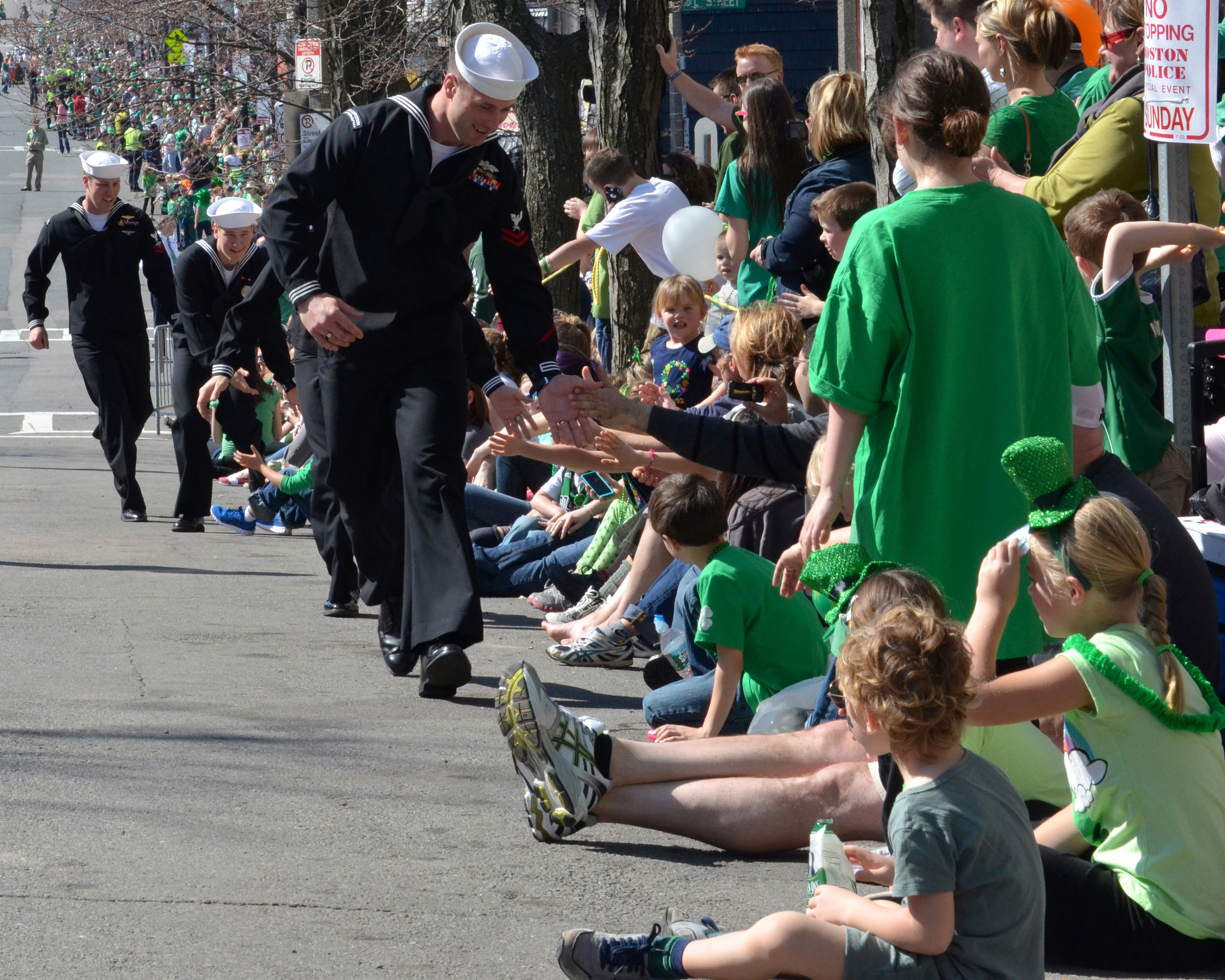
A sailor shakes hands with spectators during the 111th annual St. Patrick's Day Parade in South Boston.

The vast majority of the Irish immigrants who arrived in Boston in the 19th century were Roman Catholic. The Catholic Church, with its tradition of pastoral care, played an especially important role in the lives of the poor. While Protestant and secular charitable organizations offered various forms of assistance, they often discriminated or proselytized. To avoid that, Catholics built orphanages (the St. Vincent Female Orphan Asylum and the Home for Destitute Catholic Children), homes for wayward teens (House of the Angel Guardian and House of the Good Shepherd), a foundling home (St. Mary's Infant Asylum), two homeless shelters (Working Boys Home and Working Girls' Home), and a Catholic hospital (Carney Hospital). The Catholic St. Vincent de Paul Society offered food, shelter, clothing, and counseling. One parish, St. Francis de Sales in Charlestown, issued food stamps. In response to bias and proselytism in Protestant-dominated schools, Boston's Irish Catholics built Catholic schools. By 1917, they had established 29 elementary schools, four high schools, four academies, and one college (Boston College).

The first New England native to be ordained to the Catholic priesthood was John Thayer, a Boston-born Congregationalist minister who converted to Catholicism in 1783. Thayer started the first Catholic congregation in Boston in 1790, ministering to French and Irish immigrants; eventually, he moved to Limerick, Ireland, where he lived the rest of his life. The first church built in Boston for Catholics was the Holy Cross Church on Franklin Street, designed by Charles Bulfinch and built in 1803; it was demolished in 1862 and replaced by the Holy Cross Cathedral. The Roman Catholic Archdiocese of Boston was established in 1808 by Pope Pius VII. The Boston-born John Bernard Fitzpatrick, son of immigrants from King's County, Ireland, became the first Irish-American Bishop of Boston in 1846. Irish Americans would eventually dominate the Catholic Church in Boston. Prominent figures include Cardinal O'Connell, Cardinal Cushing, and Archbishop Williams.

In 2002, Irish Americans and other Catholics were shaken by the sexual abuse scandal in the Catholic archdiocese of Boston. The Boston Globe's coverage of a series of criminal prosecutions of five local priests drew national attention to the issue of sexual abuse by Catholic clergy and subsequent cover-ups by the church hierarchy. The Globe investigation was dramatized in Tom McCarthy's film Spotlight in 2015.

=== Media ===
The Pilot, founded in 1829, is the official newspaper of the Archdiocese of Boston. The paper was founded by Bishop Benedict Joseph Fenwick, the second bishop of Boston, at a time of increased Irish immigration to the United States. It featured a "missing friends" section and kept immigrants apprised of news from Ireland. Early editors included Patrick Donahoe and John Boyle O'Reilly.

The Boston Irish Reporter, founded in 1990, is an Irish-American monthly newspaper owned and operated by Boston Neighborhood News, Inc., of Dorchester.

=== Arts and entertainment ===
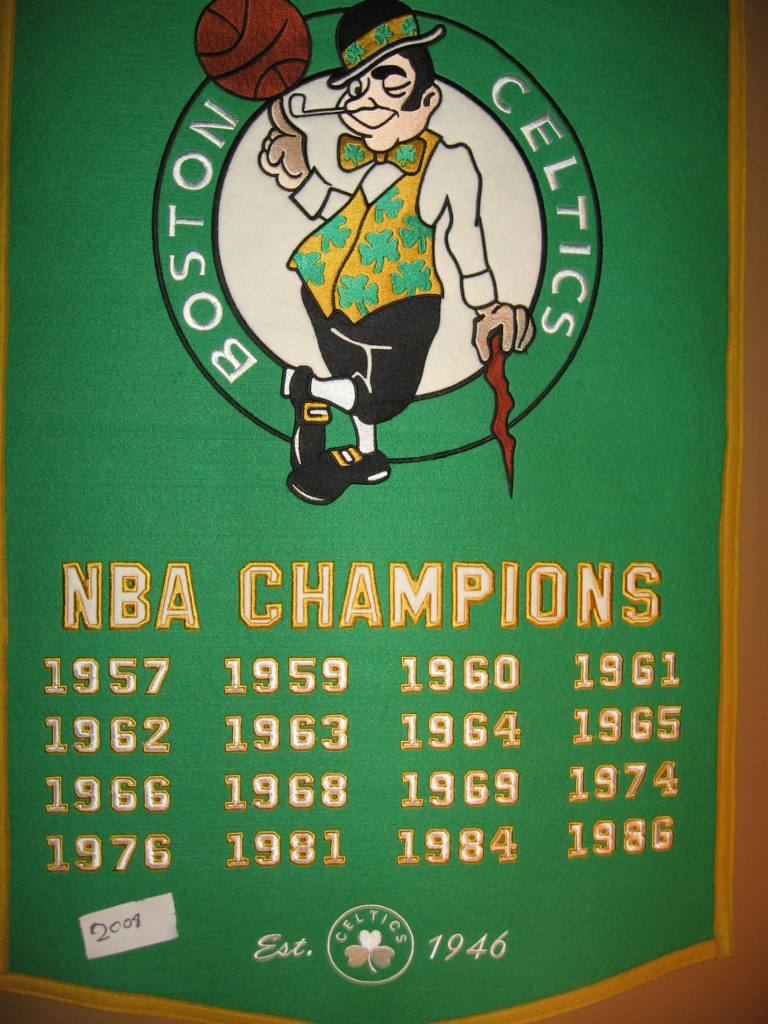
Logo of the Boston Celtics basketball team

In the mid-20th century, when Roxbury was still an Irish neighborhood, thousands of Bostonians regularly flocked to dance halls in then-Dudley Square (now Nubian Square)—the Dudley Street Opera House, Hibernian Hall, the Intercolonial, the Rose Croix, and Winslow Hall—to socialize and enjoy traditional Irish music. The dance halls have closed, but the influence of Irish music in Boston has continued. Accordionist Joe Derrane was inducted into the Comhaltas Ceoltóirí Éireann Hall of Fame in 1998 for his contribution to Irish traditional music. A number of Celtic punk bands, such as Dropkick Murphys, originated in Boston. BCMFest, Boston's annual week-long Celtic Music Festival, features local musicians of Irish, Scottish, and other Celtic traditions, and many Boston pubs, such as the Black Rose on State Street, regularly feature live Irish music. Boston hosted the 43rd World Irish Dancing Championships in 2013.

Edwin O'Connor's best-selling 1956 novel, The Last Hurrah, is set in an unnamed city, widely assumed to be Boston; its main character, Frank Skeffington, is likely based on James Michael Curley. A film adaptation, directed by John Ford and starring Spencer Tracy, was released in 1958. Films with a Boston Irish focus include Good Will Hunting (1997), The Boondock Saints (1999), Mystic River (2003), The Departed (2006), Gone Baby Gone (2007), The Town (2010), Spotlight (2015), and Black Mass (2015). Boston Accent Trailer, a faux-movie trailer that first appeared on Late Night with Seth Meyers in 2016, parodies the clichés of the genre. Documentaries include The Greening of Southie (2008), a film about the development of the Macallen Building, Boston's first green (Gold LEED certified) residence; The Irish in America (1998), a PBS special which includes a segment on Boston; Hungering for A New Life: The Potato Famine and the Irish Immigration to Boston (2014), a two-part special produced by WGBH-TV; and Clear the Floor! The Story of Irish Music in Boston (2015), produced by Newstalk.

Rugby is popular with the Irish community in Boston. The Boston Irish Wolfhounds, a rugby union team, was founded in 1989, and the Boston Thirteens, a semi-professional rugby league football team, was founded in 2009. Boston also takes part in hurling and Gaelic football competitions organized by the Gaelic Athletic Association. In other sports, Irish Bostonians in the early 20th century founded the Royal Rooters, a Boston Red Sox fan club which evolved into Red Sox Nation; and "Lucky the Leprechaun", mascot of the Boston Celtics, is a nod to Boston's historically large Irish population.

== Discrimination and stereotyping ==
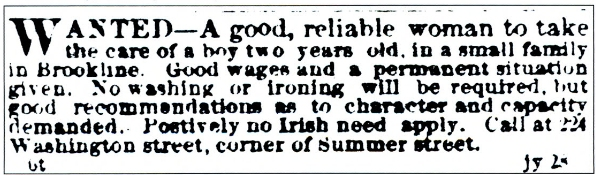
This advertisement for a nanny, warning that "positively no Irish need apply." appeared in the Boston Transcript in 1868.

Irish immigrants to the U.S. in the 19th century faced a closely intertwined combination of anti-immigrant, anti-Catholic, and specifically anti-Irish. That was especially true in Puritan-founded Boston, with its strongly Anglo-Saxon population. Generations of Bostonians celebrated Pope's Night on November 5 each year, holding anti-Catholic parades and burning the pope in effigy.

In cases of simple anti-Catholic bigotry, other ethnic groups were also affected. For example, the nuns who lived in the Ursuline convent in Charlestown, which was burned down by anti-Catholic rioters in 1834, were French Canadians. As Cardinal Richard Cushing wrote, however, not all the hostility hurled at Irish immigrants was hurled at them as Catholics; "some of it was a new chapter in the old quarrels between England and Ireland." That makes it difficult in some cases to say which form of bias was most in evidence. In 1806, for example, two Irish Catholics from Boston, Dominic Daley and James Halligan, were convicted of murder on flimsy evidence and hanged, and while it is generally agreed that the jury was biased against them, it is impossible to say whether French Catholics in their position or any outsiders, for that matter, would have suffered the same fate. Governor Michael Dukakis officially exonerated both men on St. Patrick's Day, 1984.

In 1837, the same year as the Broad Street Riot, Irish Bostonians formed their own volunteer militia company, one of ten that made up the infantry regiment of the Boston Brigade. The Montgomery Guards were named for Richard Montgomery, an Irish-born general who served in the Continental Army; their emblem depicted an American eagle alighting on an Irish harp. Their efforts had the blessing of city officials and the governor, and the local press applauded their public spirit. After the annual Fall Muster on Boston Common, however, when the green-clad Montgomery Guards marched across town to their armory at Dock Square, hostile crowds pelted them with bottles and rocks, and thousands of rioters surrounded the armory and threatened to break down the doors. The company was forced to disband for public safety reasons.

The Irish who arrived during the famine years were among the poorest and least welcome immigrants in Boston. In 1850, a group of African Americans living on Elm Street signed a petition to keep the Irish out of their neighborhood. Advertisements for domestic servants sometimes stipulated "a Protestant woman", implying that an Irish Protestant would be acceptable; others specifically warned, "No Irish need apply."

After the Civil War, Irish Bostonians found that the prejudice against them had lessened somewhat. The Massachusetts legislature repealed the law requiring a two-year waiting period before new citizens could vote and passed a bill effectively declaring that Catholic students could no longer be compelled to read from the King James Bible. Soon afterwards, city officials announced that patients at Boston City Hospital could be attended by the clergy of their choice. By then, however, the damage had been done; according to historian Thomas H. O'Connor, the bitter hostilities of the 19th century had created divisions that lasted well into the 20th.

== Demographics ==
People of Irish descent form the largest single ethnic group in Boston, making up 15.8% of the population as of 2013. As of 2014, Irish Americans made up 22.8% (some estimates have it more in the 30%-45% range) of the population of the metropolitan Boston area—the highest percentage of any of the 50 most populous U.S. cities—and 21.5% of the population of Massachusetts. Many cities and towns on the South Shore of Massachusetts have high percentages of Irish-descended residents. As of 2010, the most Irish city in the U.S. (regardless of population size) was Scituate, Massachusetts, with 47.5% (other estimates have the number all the way up to 80%) of its residents claiming Irish ancestry.

== Notable Irish Americans from Boston ==
- Ben Affleck (b. 1972), actor, filmmaker
- Casey Affleck (b. 1975), actor and director
- Fred Allen (1894–1956), comedian
- Marcella Boveri (1863–1950), biologist; first woman to graduate from MIT
- Jacob Bannon (b. 1976), musician and graphic artist
- Whitey Bulger (1929–2018), organized crime boss
- Mary Beth Cahill (b. 1954), political consultant
- Andrew Carney (1794–1864), entrepreneur, philanthropist
- Ken Casey of Dropkick Murphys (b. 1969), musician
- Thomas Cass (1821–1862), Civil War colonel
- Molly Childers (1875–1964), writer, Irish nationalist
- Lenny Clarke (b. 1953), comedian
- John F. Collins (1919–1995), 41st mayor
- Patrick Collins (1844–1905), 32nd mayor
- Hal Connolly (1931–2010), Olympic athlete
- James Brendan Connolly (1868–1957), first modern Olympic champion
- John Singleton Copley (1738–1815), Anglo-Irish portraitist
- James Michael Curley (1874–1958), 35th mayor; served four terms
- Jane Curtin (b. 1946), actress and comedian
- Richard Cushing (1895–1970), Archbishop of Boston, Cardinal
- Daley and Halligan, defendants in controversial 1806 murder case
- Joe Derrane (1930–2016), Irish accordionist
- Patrick Donahoe (1811–1901), publisher
- Brian J. Donnelly (b. 1946), Congressman, U.S. Ambassador
- Julia Duff (1859–1932), educator and community leader
- Chris Evans (b. 1981), actor
- John F. Fitzgerald (1863–1950), 33rd mayor; grandfather of John F. Kennedy
- John Bernard Fitzpatrick (1812–1866), first Irish bishop of Boston
- Thomas Flatley (1931–2008), real estate developer, philanthropist
- Raymond Flynn (b. 1939), 43rd mayor; ambassador to the Holy See
- Margaret Foley (1875–1957), suffragist
- Patrick Gilmore (1829–1892), composer and bandmaster
- Ann Glover (?–1688), last person to be hanged as a witch in Boston
- Paul Guilfoyle (b. 1949), actor
- Louise Imogen Guiney (1861–1920), poet and essayist
- Patrick Robert Guiney (1835–1877), Civil War hero
- Louise Day Hicks (1916–2003), politician, opponent of busing
- John B. Hynes (1897–1970), 40th mayor
- The Kennedy family
- Edward Lawrence Logan (1875–1939), judge, general, politician
- Denis Leary (b. 1957), actor, comedian
- Dennis Lehane (b. 1965), author
- Martin Lomasney (1859–1933), political boss
- Stephen F. Lynch (b. 1955), U.S. Congressman
- Michael Patrick MacDonald (b. 1966), author and activist
- Frederick Mansfield (1877–1958), 38th mayor
- Edward Markey (1946–present), U.S. Senator from Massachusetts
- John McCarthy (1927–2011), artificial intelligence pioneer
- William J. McCarthy (1919–1998), labor leader
- John W. McCormack (1891–1980), politician, speaker of the House
- George F. McGinnis (1826–1910), Civil War general
- John J. McGinty III (1940–2014), Medal of Honor recipient
- Mary McGrory (1918–2004), Pulitzer Prize-winning journalist
- Joe Moakley (1927–2001), politician; led the Moakley Commission
- Barbara Mullen (1914–1979), actress
- Brian Noonan, Stanley Cup-winning hockey player
- Conan O'Brien (b. 1963), television host
- Hugh O'Brien (1827–1895), 27th mayor; first Irish mayor of Boston
- Sister Mary Anthony O'Connell (1814–1897), Civil War nurse
- William Henry O'Connell (1859–1944), Archbishop of Boston, Cardinal
- Julia O'Connor (1890–1972), labor leader
- Thomas H. O'Connor (1923–2012), "the dean of Boston historians"
- Mike O'Malley (b. 1966), actor
- Tip O'Neill (1912–1994), politician, speaker of the House
- John Boyle O'Reilly (1844–1890), poet, newspaper editor
- Mary Kenney O'Sullivan (1864–1943), labor leader
- Kathleen O'Toole (b. 1954), Boston's first female police commissioner
- Amy Poehler (b. 1971), actress and comedian
- John E. Powers (1910–1998), Massachusetts senate president
- John Slattery (b. 1962), actor
- Anne Sullivan (1866–1936), teacher of Helen Keller
- James Sullivan (1744–1808), Massachusetts governor
- John L. Sullivan (1858–1918), heavyweight boxing champion
- Frances Sweeney (1908–1944), newspaper editor and activist
- Maura Tierney (b. 1965), actress
- Daniel J. Tobin (1875–1955), labor leader
- Maurice J. Tobin (1901–1953), 39th mayor; 56th Governor of Massachusetts, U.S. Secretary of Labor
- Patsy Touhey (1865–1923), uilleann piper
- Donnie Wahlberg (b. 1969), actor and singer
- Mark Wahlberg (b. 1971), actor
- David I. Walsh (1872–1947) Massachusetts governor, U.S. senator
- Marian Walsh (b. ?), politician and educator
- Marty Walsh (b. 1967), 45th mayor, U.S. Secretary of Labor
- Kevin White (1929–2012), 42nd mayor; served four terms
- John Joseph Williams (1822–1907), Boston's first Catholic archbishop

== See also ==
- Eire Society of Boston
- Mayor of Boston
- Roman Catholic Archdiocese of Boston
- South Boston
