= Broad Street Riot =

1837 brawl between Irish Americans and firefighters in Boston, Massachusetts

- Part of Mass racial violence in the United States
- Date: June 11, 1837
- Location: Boston, Massachusetts, U.S.
- Caused by: Firefighters and marchers brawl
- Result: Arrests

Parties
Anglo-American rioters: Firefighters; Anglo-American locals	Irish American rioters: Funeral marchers; Irish locals	Law enforcement: US Military; National Lancers

Casualties
- Death: 0

The Broad Street Riot was a massive brawl that occurred in Boston, Massachusetts, on June 11, 1837, between Irish Americans and Yankee firefighters. An estimated 800 people were involved in the actual fighting, with at least 10,000 spectators egging them on. Nearby homes were sacked and vandalized, and the occupants beaten. Many on both sides were seriously injured, but no immediate deaths resulted from the violence. After raging for hours, the riot was quelled when Mayor Samuel Eliot called in the state cavalry, the National Lancers, to quell the riot.

In the wake of the riot, Boston's police and fire departments were established.

== History ==
=== Background ===
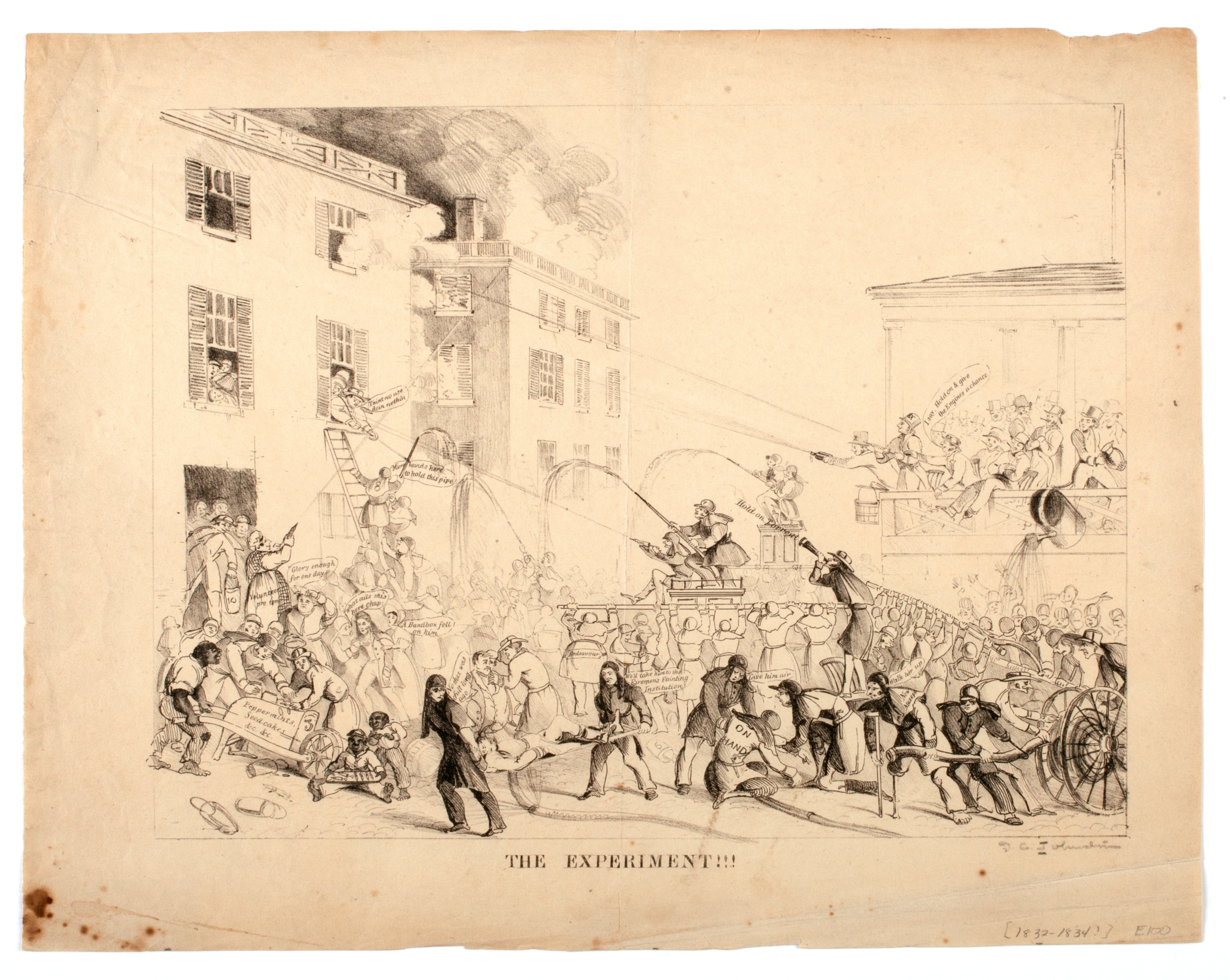
"The Experiment", a cartoon by David Claypoole Johnston depicting Boston's firefighters, 1837.

Boston was a major center for immigration in the 19th century due to its large seaport. Nativist and anti-Catholic sentiment was strong, especially among working-class men whose jobs and wages were threatened by an influx of poor Irish immigrants. On Broad Street, it was common for groups of nativist Yankees to vandalize Irish homes and attack lone Irishmen. In 1832, Mayor Charles Wells received a petition "praying that some measures may be taken to suppress the dangerous riots, routs, and tumultuous assemblies in and about Broad Street."

At the time of this particular riot, nearly all of Boston's firefighters were volunteers. The city had a policy of paying whichever company was first to arrive on the scene. As a result, the volunteer fire companies were intensely competitive, as well as notoriously undisciplined, and often fought with each other. In 1834 the entire company attached to Engine 13 was dismissed for disorderly conduct. The volunteers were nearly all working-class "Yankees", meaning American-born Protestants.

Boston also had no police department, only a City Marshal with a small number of night watchmen.

=== Riot ===
At about 3 p.m. on Sunday, June 11, 1837, Fire Engine Company 20 returned from a fire at the Boston Neck to their station on East Street. Some of the men went straight home from there; most stopped at a nearby pub for drinks. As Mayor Eliot's grandson later noted in his account of the incident, the pub must have been operating illegally as it was a Sunday, and, in Massachusetts, blue laws were then in effect.

The men had just emerged from the pub "in a more or less bellicose mood," when they collided with a crowd of about a hundred Irishmen who were on their way to join a large funeral procession on Sea Street. Nearly all of the firefighters had passed through the crowd without incident when 19-year-old George Fay, who had reportedly had too much to drink, insulted or shoved several of the Irishmen, and a fight broke out. Fay's friends rushed to his aid, but the firemen were outnumbered and were badly beaten. Their foreman, W.W. Miller, ordered them back into the firehouse.

By some accounts, the Irishmen then took over the firehouse. According to others, the crowd had begun to disperse, and the matter might have ended there had the foreman not "lost his head completely". In any case, Miller ordered his men to sound the emergency alarm. First they rolled their wagon into the street, ringing the fire alarm bell; then Miller sent men to ring the church bells, summoning all the fire engines in Boston. According to the Boston Transcript, Miller then ran to another firehouse, shouting, "The Irish have risen upon us, and are going to kill us!"

Company 9, responding to what they thought was a legitimate fire alarm, arrived just as the funeral procession was turning onto New Broad Street. Their horse-drawn wagon veered into the crowd, scattering and knocking down the mourners. The Irish assumed the assault was deliberate, and another brawl erupted. As more fire companies arrived, and Irishmen poured out of nearby houses into the street to help their friends and relatives, the fight escalated into a full-blown riot. Before long, an estimated 800 men were doing battle with sticks, stones, bricks, and cudgels while at least 10,000 more urged them on. (Note: Sources differ as to the total number of people involved. According to historian Thomas H. O'Connor, it was "an estimated ten thousand people watching eight hundred men fight it out with sticks and stones, bricks and cudgels". Historical writers Jack Tager and James Cullen put the total at "over fifteen thousand", while Roger Lane writes that the mob was "eventually estimated at fifteen thousand, more than one-sixth of the city's population".) Protestant workmen came running to the aid of the firefighters, while underfoot, injured and unconscious men lay sprawled on the pavement.

Outnumbered, the Irish were defeated and driven back to their homes. That was when the home invasions began. A "gang of stout boys and loafers" raided nearby houses, breaking doors and windows, in some cases beating the occupants. Furniture and other possessions were destroyed and thrown into the street. Some Irish families lost their homes altogether. According to one historian, "Featherbeds were ripped up and their contents scattered to the winds in such quantities that for a while, Broad Street seemed to be having a snowstorm...the pavement in spots buried ankle-deep in feathers."

After raging for about three hours, the riot was quelled when Mayor Samuel A. Eliot called in the National Lancers—a newly formed cavalry company—and some 800 other members of the state militia, with fixed bayonets. Among them were the Montgomery Guards, a short-lived Irish-American infantry company which was forced to disband the following year due to the extreme nativist and anti-Catholic sentiment in Boston. The militiamen were easily contacted because many of them were in church attending Sunday services, and the church bells were rung in a certain way as a signal to report to the armory.

=== Aftermath ===
No immediate deaths resulted from the violence. In one case, a Yankee fireman was knocked unconscious, and false reports of his death caused the rioting to escalate. A local paper announced the following Monday, "There have been many battered and broken heads, and many bodily bruises; but we are inclined to believe there has been no actual loss of life." Many people suffered serious wounds, however, and there was no nearby hospital to care for them. Given the lack of hospital and police records, the number of people who eventually died of their injuries cannot be determined. Thousands of dollars in damage was done to property belonging to some of the city's poorest inhabitants.

The militia, being composed nearly entirely of Yankees, arrested 34 Irishmen and 4 Yankees. A grand jury indicted 14 of the Irishmen and all four of the Yankees. At the municipal court trial, a Yankee jury acquitted the four Yankees and convicted four Irishmen, three of whom were sentenced to several months of hard labor.

Three months later, in September, Mayor Eliot established a professional, paid fire department, with all new hires requiring the approval of the mayor and aldermen. The Boston Police Department was established the following year.

== In popular culture ==
The riot was used as the basis of the Mighty Mighty Bosstones song "Riot on Broad Street". The narrative from the song differs from the facts as presented by numerous historians. According to most sources, the riot commenced between an engine company returning from a fire, and an Irish funeral procession. In the song, however, the firefighters are described as being on their way to an ongoing fire at a brownstone. The song further describes the frustration of the firefighters halted by a funeral procession moving "way too slow". The song concludes with a lyric that the "brownstone lay in ashes".

== See also ==
- History of Irish Americans in Boston
- Ursuline Convent riots
