= Patrick Donahoe =

Irish-American publisher

Patrick Donahoe

Patrick Donahoe (born Munnery, County Cavan, Ireland, 17 March 1811; died Boston, U.S.A., 18 March 1901) was a publisher who founded influential magazines for the Irish Catholic community in his adopted country.

== Early life ==
Patrick Donahoe was born in Ireland in 1811. His father was a linen weaver, and his mother died when he was only two; at that point, the Donahoe family consisted of Patrick and his four sisters ("Mr. Donahoe's Life," 2). Eventually, his father remarried and the family emigrated to America, settling in Boston when Patrick was ten years old. Irish Catholics were still an unwelcome minority in Boston at that time ("Patrick Donahoe," 5), and Patrick later told the Boston Journal how he was beaten and bullied in school; undoubtedly, this contributed to his dropping out at age fourteen (some sources say age fifteen). He first worked briefly for the Colombian Sentinel before becoming a printer's apprentice at the Boston Transcript newspaper, the voice of the Protestant upper-class in Boston (Irish Leader, 1). He learned a trade, but he recalled experiencing a hostile environment, before finally proving himself. By the time he left the Transcript, he was a successful printer and compositor ("Passed His Birthday," 1). Donahoe married in 1836, but his wife Catherine died of consumption (tuberculosis) in 1852 at the age of 36 ("Death Notice," Boston Evening Transcript, November 13, 1852, p. 2). Donahoe would later remarry; his second wife's name was Annie.

== Business career ==
He began working as the editor of a Catholic newspaper, The Jesuit in 1832: this newspaper had been started in 1829 by Bishop Fenwick. Working for the newspaper provided an opportunity for Donahoe to defend his religion and make non-Catholic readers more familiar with what Catholics believed ("Passed His Birthday," 1). The newspaper was not a financial success, but when the bishop relinquished its ownership, Donahoe carried it on, along with a business partner, newspaper publisher Henry L. Devereaux, under the new title of The Literary and Catholic Sentinel. In 1836, Donahoe changed the publication's name to The Pilot, which was now a weekly paper devoted to Irish-American and Catholic interests (Negri, 40). It soon became the chief organ of Catholic opinion in New England. Donahoe also established, in connection with The Pilot, a publishing and book-selling house from which were issued a large number of Catholic books. Later, in 1870, he organized the Emigrant Savings Bank, and became its president ("Patrick Donahoe's Case," 5).

As his business ventures proved successful, he donated some of the wealth he acquired to the advancement of Catholic interests; he was well known in Boston for his philanthropy, establishing a Home for Destitute Catholic Children and supporting other causes that helped the poor in his community ("Irish Leader," 1; "Passed His Birthday" 1). During the American Civil War he actively interested himself in the organization of the Irish regiments that volunteered from New England. And at a time when doubts about the patriotism of Catholics could still be heard, Donahoe used his newspaper to strongly advocate in favor of the union cause and write about the Irish soldiers serving in the war ("An Old Boston Publisher," 6). But his business was negatively affected by the Great Boston Fire of 1872, which also destroyed his publishing plant. Another fire in the following year and injudicious loans to friends, as well as some unwise real estate speculation ("Patrick Donahoe's Case," 5), made him lose so much money that his bank failed in 1876. Archbishop Williams purchased The Pilot to help to pay the depositors of the bank. Donahoe then started a monthly Donahoe's Magazine, described as "a journal devoted to the Irish, at home and abroad" ("New Publications," 7). He also established a monetary exchange and passenger agency. In 1881 he was able to buy back The Pilot and devoted his remaining years to its management. In 1893 the University of Notre Dame gave him the Laetare Medal for signal services to American Catholic progress.

== Final years ==
After falling at home, Donahoe was bed-ridden, and throughout the year 1900, he was in declining health. When he finally died at his home, just after St. Patrick's Day in 1901, at the age of 90, his family had been expecting it; his wife, three sons and a daughter were at his bedside ("Tears From All," 6). His death was front page news in all the Boston newspapers. Typical of the acclaim he received was a headline in the Boston Herald which referred to him as "A Patriot and the Patriarch of His Race Among the People of New England" ("Mr. Donahoe's Life," 1).
