= Donahoe's Magazine =

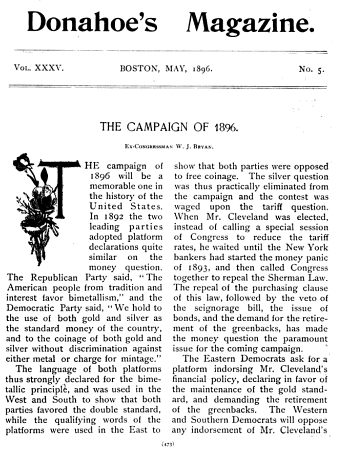
Donahoe's Magazine, 1896

Donahoe's Magazine was a United States–based Catholic-oriented general interest magazine that ran from about 1878 to July 1908, when it was absorbed by the Catholic World of New York. It was founded by Patrick Donahoe, one-time editor of the New York Pilot. Mary Blanche O'Sullivan, became editor in 1898.
