= Mary Blanche O'Sullivan =

Mary Blanche O'Sullivan (April 30, 1860 – ?) was a Canadian teacher, writer, and editor. She taught in public schools for ten years; served as editor-in-chief of Donahoe's Magazine for 12 years; and was a contributor to the same. She was also a member of the New England Woman's Press Association.

== Biography ==
Mary Blanche O'Sullivan was born at Saint John, New Brunswick, April 30, 1860. She was educated in St. Vincent's Convent, and graduated from the Provincial Normal School. For some years, she taught in the public schools of Saint John, and while thus engaged also formed a literary connection, contributing short stories, essays, and descriptive articles to numerous publications in the US and Canada. In order to devote her time more fully to literary work, O'Sullivan resigned from St. Malachi's, and moved to Boston, in 1891, and in the following year, became a staff contributor and department editor on Donahoe's Magazine. During the editorship of Dr. Henry Austin Adams, O'Sullivan was promoted to the position of associate editor, and on his resignation, in 1898, she assumed the position as the editorial head of this monthly. In 1920, she became a naturalized citizen of the US.
