= Montgomery Guards =

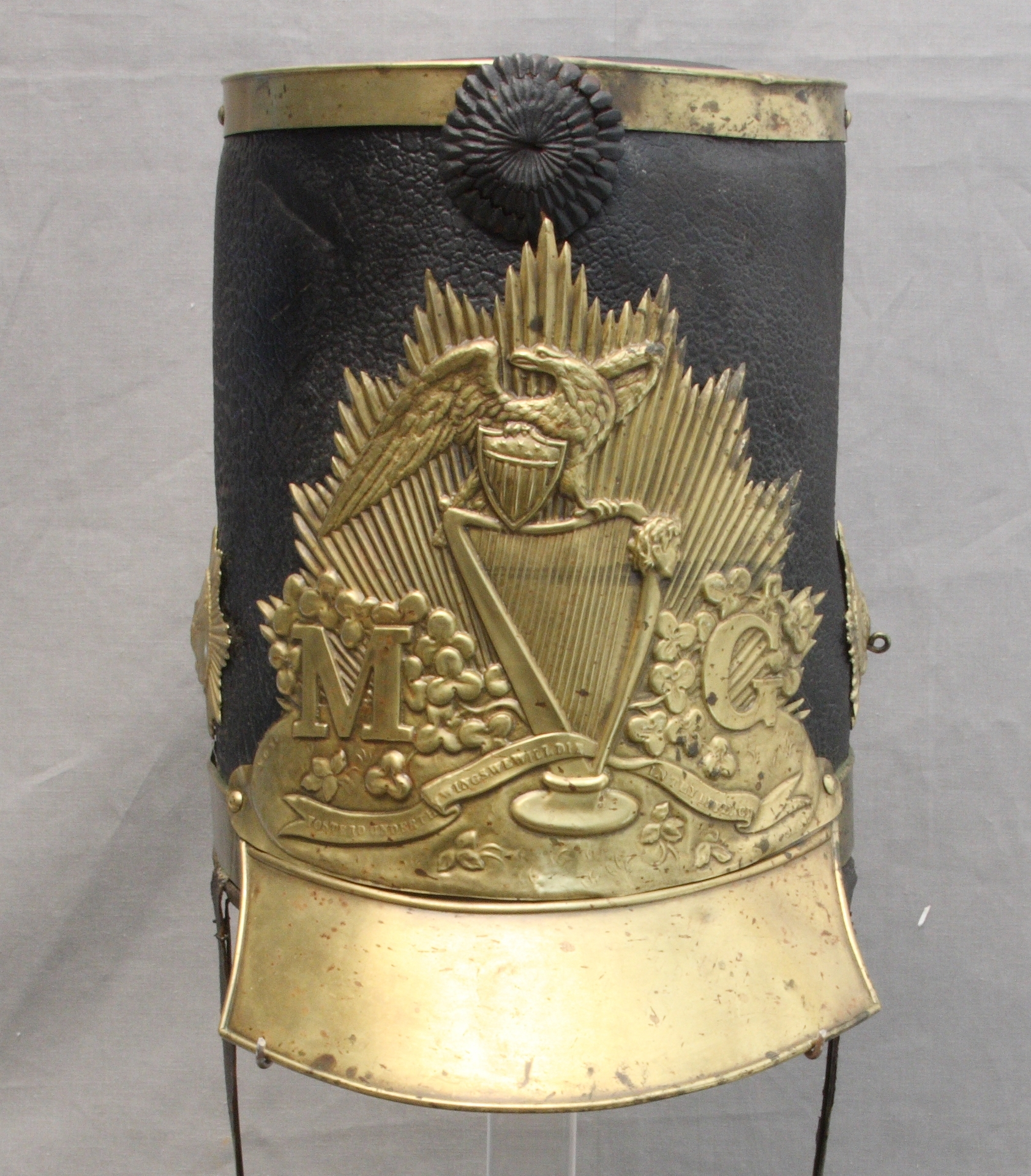
Montgomery Guards Shako

The Montgomery Guards were an Irish-American militia company that formed in Boston in 1837 and were forced to disband the following year due to extreme nativist and anti-Catholic sentiment in the city.

On September 12, 1837, at the annual fall muster on Boston Common, six companies of militiamen marched off the field to protest the inclusion of the Montgomery Guards. Afterwards, as the company's forty members marched down Tremont Street to their armory, they were mobbed by about 3,000 angry spectators who pelted them with bottles and rocks and threatened to storm the building.

City officials and the press strongly denounced the riot and praised the Montgomery Guards for their restraint. Nevertheless, Governor Edward Everett ordered the disbandment of the company for public safety reasons. Another company by the same name was formed sometime after the American Civil War.

== History ==
=== Background ===
After the War of 1812, the size of the U.S. Army was greatly reduced, and a large number of volunteer militia companies sprang up across the country to fill the gap. The militias protected local people and property during times of war and civil unrest. They also served a social purpose. In addition to regular drills and inspections, volunteers attended banquets, dances, and parades, where their smart-looking uniforms attracted envy and attention. For working-class men it was a way to gain social status and attract women, and for immigrants in particular it was a chance to display their loyalty to their new country.

In January 1837, several Irish Americans from Boston petitioned Governor Edward Everett for permission to form their own company. In the past, similar requests by Irish residents had been declined, but this time the petition came with the recommendation of the highest-ranking officers in the militia, and the request was granted. The new group, composed of eight naturalized Irish immigrants and thirty-two native-born citizens of Irish descent, became the Tenth Company of Light Infantry, Regiment of Light Infantry, Third Brigade, First Division, Massachusetts Volunteer Militia—otherwise known as the Montgomery Guards.

The new company was one of several Irish-American militia companies named for Richard Montgomery, an Irish-born general who had served in the Continental Army; others were started in New York, Philadelphia, and New Orleans. Among the organizers of the Boston company was the philanthropist Andrew Carney, who was then a partner in a clothing firm that supplied the U.S. Navy with uniforms. Thus the Montgomery Guards of Boston were provided with custom-designed green uniforms with scarlet facings and gold trim, and caps bearing their own company emblem: an American eagle alighting on an Irish harp. Their motto, borrowed from the Charitable Irish Society, was "Fostered under thy wings, we will die in thy defense."

They were first called to duty on June 11, to help quell the Broad Street Riot. City officials and the local press commended their performance, and a week later the governor himself reviewed their first parade, which was followed by a formal banquet at the Concert Hall.

This auspicious beginning did not reflect the attitude of most Bostonians toward Irish Catholics. While Boston's elites welcomed the new company, others were horrified by the thought of Irishmen being provided with weapons and military training. Anti-Catholic literature of the time depicted Irish immigrants as part of a "papist" conspiracy to take over the country. Rumors circulated that the governor had succumbed to "foreign influence," and resentment simmered among the other companies at being forced to accept people they saw as dangerous outsiders into their regiment.

=== Walkout and riot ===
On the morning of September 12, 1837, at the annual fall muster on Boston Common, the Montgomery Guards joined the other nine companies that made up the light infantry regiment of the Boston Brigade. No sooner had the companies finished moving into line than a signal was given, and the rank and file of the City Guard marched off the field and back to their armory, playing Yankee Doodle on the fife and drum. Their officers were left standing at attention. Five other infantry companies followed suit: the Lafayette Guards, the Independent Fusiliers, the Washington Light Infantry, the Mechanics Rifles, and the Winslow Guards. The walkout was intended as a public insult to the Irish company. Even the choice of song was significant, in that the term "Yankee" was understood to mean New England natives of English descent.

The Montgomery Guards went through their planned maneuvers with the remaining three companies, all the while being taunted and jeered by spectators. When the brigade was dismissed that afternoon, the Montgomery Guards marched back to their armory in Dock Square near Faneuil Hall. As they marched down Tremont Street, a hostile crowd followed them, shouting epithets and pelting them with stones, lumps of coal, and billets of wood. One volunteer was knocked down, and his weapon smashed; another was hit with a paving stone. Neither the local constabulary nor the other militia companies came to their defense.

By the time they made it to their armory, the crowd had grown to about 3,000. The Montgomery Guards were trapped inside as the angry mob threatened to storm the building. Only when Mayor Samuel A. Eliot arrived with a group of prominent—and armed—citizens was the crowd persuaded to disperse.

The riot was a minor one, by Boston standards; there were injuries but no deaths, and not much property damage. Nevertheless, it sent a message, loudly and clearly, to Boston's elites: working-class Yankees were not ready to accept Irish Catholics into their ranks, and were willing to use direct action to achieve their ends.

=== Aftermath ===
Often in cases of mob violence against minorities, city authorities have been known to look the other way, or condemn the offenders publicly for appearances' sake while feigning ignorance of their identities. Such was decidedly not the case in Boston on this occasion. Several of the rioters were arrested and tried in the municipal court. According to one historian, Judge Thacher sentenced two of the offenders to three years in the House of Correction, and another to two years. The local press was severe on the militiamen who had deserted their posts, and denounced the rioters as "miserable vagabonds," while the Montgomery Guards were praised for their discipline and restraint in the face of provocation.

In February 1838, Governor Everett ordered the disbandment of all six mutinous companies. In April, however, succumbing to political pressure, he ordered the disbandment of the Montgomery Guards as well, on the grounds that their reappearance would provoke "outrages of a dangerous character." Within six months, all six of the offending companies had been rechartered under different names, but with the same officers and enlisted men. The Montgomery Guards were not given permission to reorganize.

=== Later incarnation ===
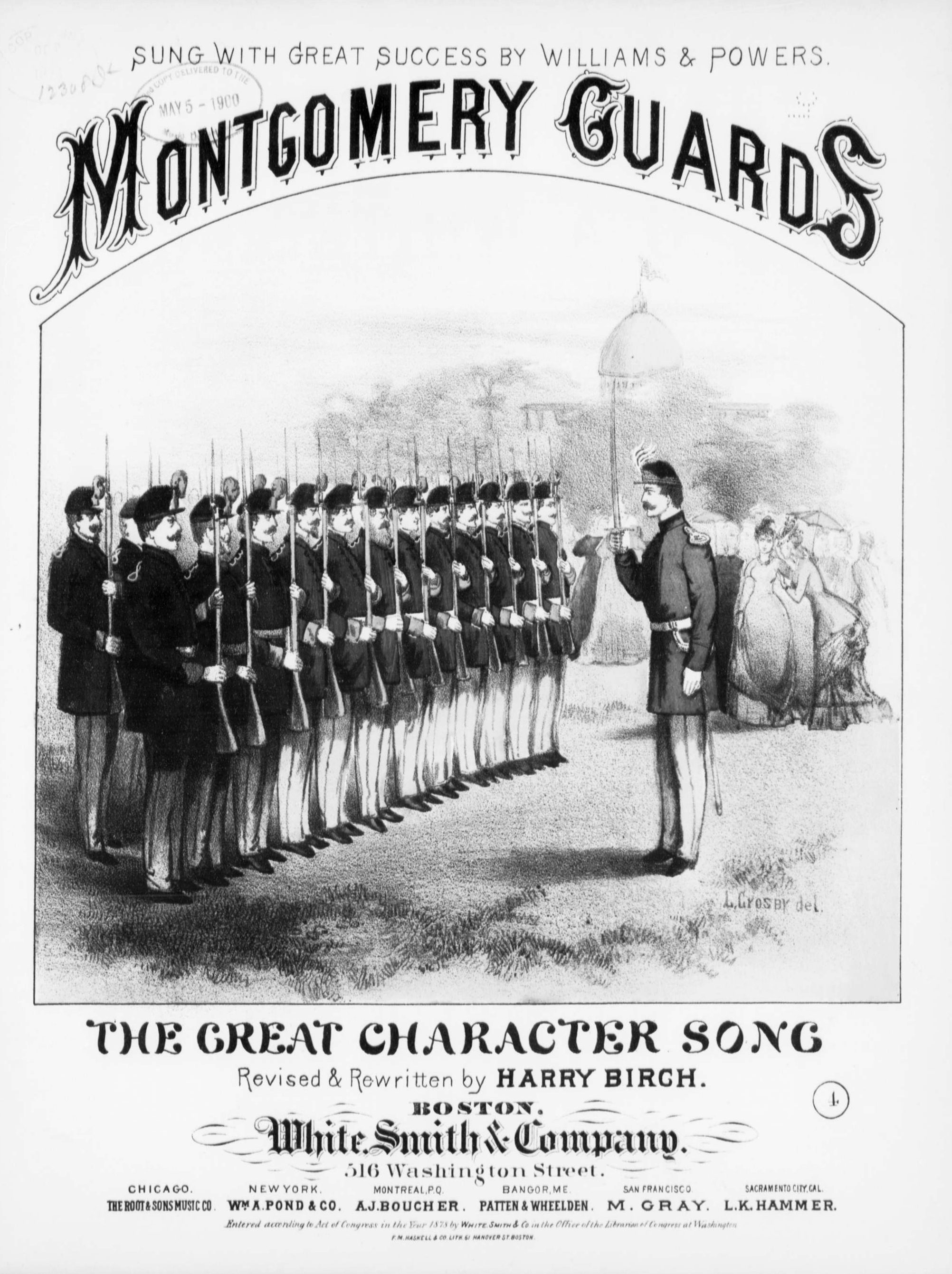
"Montgomery Guards" sheet music, 1878

Another company, also named the Montgomery Guards, or the Montgomery Light Guard, was apparently formed after the Civil War. In 1868, the "Montgomery Light Guard of the Ninth Massachusetts Volunteers" traveled to New York for a competitive drill. Their armory was located at 544 Washington Street, and they were reportedly "one of the best drilled companies in the Ninth Regiment." They were also known as Company I.

In 1878, White, Smith & Company published a song titled "Montgomery Guards." By this time, Irish Americans made up more than 22% of Boston's population. They had proven their loyalty by fighting for the Union, which had helped to dispel some of the prejudice against them. With strength in numbers, and the rise of ward bosses, they had also begun to be a political force in Boston. If the lyrics of "Montgomery Guards" are any indication, the new company was treated with far more respect than the original had been:

We are the famed Montgom'ry guards you've heard so much about
We make the street resound with cheers whenever we turn out
Our uniforms are neat and gay, the finest in the land,
We muster upon Washington street, that's where we make our stand

Our Captain's name is Flynn, a finer man you never saw
Sure he is always gay and free and ready for the war
When on parade the people watch the motion of our feet,
And shout aloud, "Montgom'ry guards, the chaps that can't be beat!"

== See also ==
- 9th Regiment Massachusetts Volunteer Infantry
- History of Irish Americans in Boston
- Ursuline Convent riots
- Massasoit Guards
