= Andrew Carney =

Philanthropist (1794–1864)

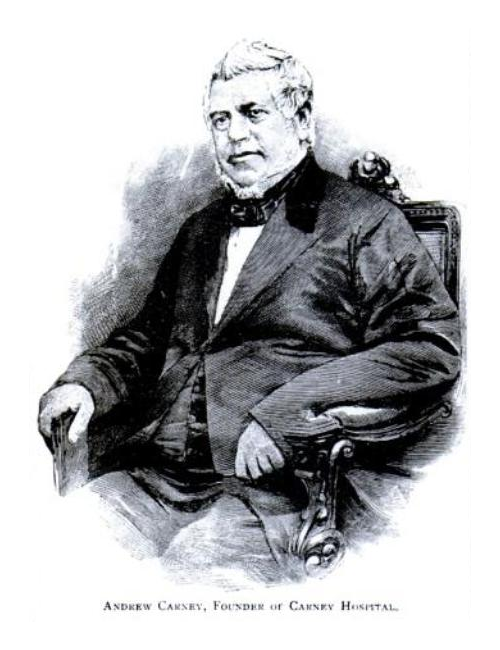
- Born: 12 June 1794; County Cavan, Ireland
- Died: 3 April 1864 (aged 69); Boston, Massachusetts, United States
- Resting place: Forest Hills Cemetery
- Known for: Entrepreneur and Philanthropist
- Spouse: Pamelia Carney
- Children: Pamelia Josephine (Miller) (Carney) Reggio

Andrew Carney (1794–1864) was an Irish-born American philanthropist. He immigrated to the United States in 1816. Carney partnered with Jacob Sleeper to form Carney & Sleeper, Clothiers. Carney was a wise investor and grew his fortune with investments in Boston's real estate market. Carney's interests turned to finance and he assisted in founding the First National Bank of Boston and the John Hancock Insurance Company for which he worked as a director. Carney cared for the youth of Boston by founding the St. Vincent Home for Girls, and was a benefactor of the House of the Angel Guardian for Homeless Boys and the Home for Destitute Catholic Children. Carney worked with Jesuit leaders in Boston, and helped finance the Church of the Immaculate Conception and Boston College in 1863. Carney established Carney Hospital, the first Catholic hospital in New England in 1863.

== Early years ==
Andrew Carney was born May 12, 1794, in Bellananagh, County Cavan, Ireland. As a young man he became an apprentice in the tailoring industry. He left Ireland and immigrated to Boston, Massachusetts, in the United States of America in 1816.

== Business ventures ==
With tailoring skills in hand, Carney secured a job with Kelley and Hudson, tailors located on State Street in Boston. Carney left Kelly and Hudson to partner with a Methodist from Maine named Jacob Sleeper and established Carney & Sleeper, Clothiers on North Street in Boston's North End. In 1835, they received a contract to supply the U.S. Navy with uniforms. The Naval contract coupled with declining material and labor costs, caused by the Panic of 1837 resulted in high profits. The venture became one of the largest clothing houses of the times. However, in 1845 Carney & Sleeper Clothiers was dissolved leaving its two owners very wealthy.

Carney, then 50 years old, would initially devote his time to increasing his wealth by making prudent investments in Boston's real estate market. His interests in banking eventually lead him to assist in founding the First National Bank of Boston and the John Hancock Insurance Company for which he worked as a director.

== Philanthropy ==
Andrew Carney had come to the United States as a poor man with nothing but a tremendous work ethic. By 1850 he was one of the wealthiest Catholics in New England.

In 1837 he was an organizer of the Montgomery Guards, an Irish-American militia company in Boston which was forced to disband due to nativist and anti-Catholic sentiment.

Bishop John Bernard Fitzpatrick was looking to provide a Church for the Catholic community in the Fort Hill neighborhood of Boston. Carney provided the capital to purchase a Unitarian Church on E and West Third Street. On May 14, 1848, the Church of St. Vincent de Paul was opened for Catholic services.

Carney was a major supporter of Father Theobold Mathew’s temperance crusade in 1850.

House of the Angel Guardian for Homeless Boys

Carney was a benefactor of the House of the Angel Guardian for Homeless Boys. This institution, established by Father George Foxcroft Haskins in 1851, was set up to provide a temporary home for homeless, neglected, or unmanageable boys 10 to 16 years of age and run by the Brothers of Charity.

In 1833, Sister Ann Alexis Shorb and the Sisters of Charity founded the St. Vincent's Female Orphan Asylum (a.k.a. St. Vincent's Home for Girls) where Carney served as a trustee. In April 1858 he donated $12,000 for the construction of new quarters located at the corner of Camden Street and Shawmut Avenue. The new brick structure was 4 stories tall and could house 20 sisters and 400 girls.

Carney purchased land in Boston's South End and donated it to the church. The plot was used for the construction of the Cathedral of the Holy Cross in 1860.

Carney Hospital at the Howe Mansion in South Boston

In 1863, Carney gifted Howe Mansion in South Boston, a $13,500 estate, to the Sisters of Charity for the establishment of a Catholic hospital in Boston to care for the sick and poor, irrespective of race, color or creed. The Carney Hospital, under the direction of Sister Ann Alexis Shorb, opened its doors to its first patient on June 9, 1863. Carney Hospital was the first Catholic hospital in New England. Carney donated $45,295 during his life to the hospital, plus he would bequest an additional $20,000, for a total of $75,295.

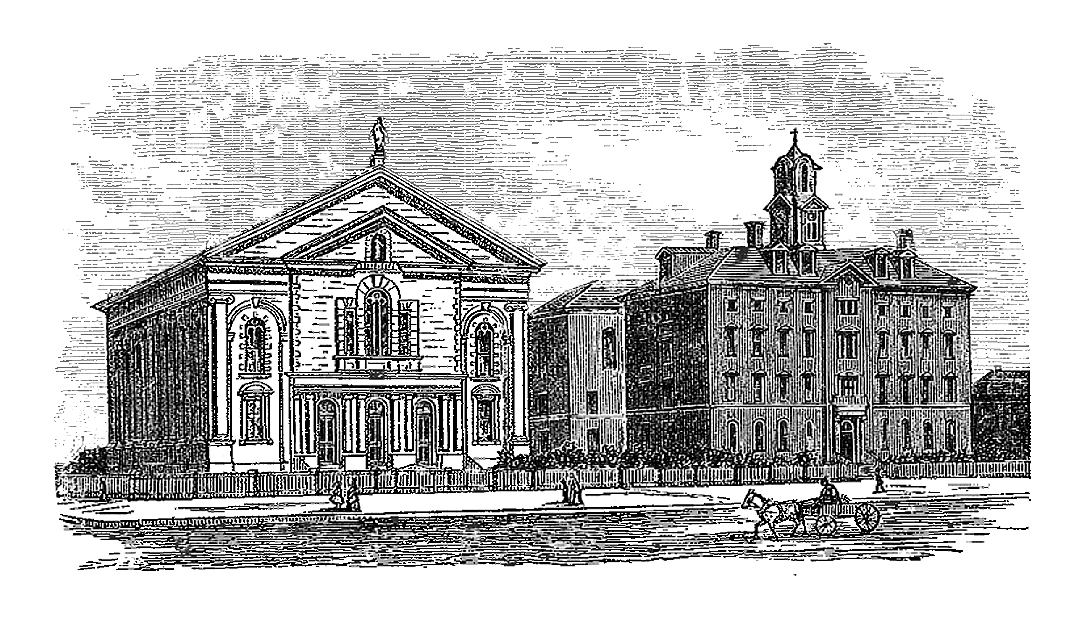
Church of the Immaculate Conception (left) and Boston College (right) (1860) in Boston's South End

Carney played a major role in the founding of Boston College and the Church of the Immaculate Conception. He donated $5000 plus all of the construction expenses to John McElroy, S.J the person responsible for the planning and creation of the college and church, who would oversee the use of the gift to complete the projects. In 1858, Bishop Fitzpatrick and Father McElroy broke ground for Boston College, and The Church of the Immaculate Conception. Classes began in the fall of 1864. In 1963, Carney Hall was erected on the grounds of the Boston College campus in Chestnut Hill, in the memory of Andrew Carney.

Carney was a benefactor of the Home for Destitute Catholic Children. This institution, established by Bishop John Joseph Williams in 1851, was set up to provide a temporary home for children 3 to 12 years old until they are placed in houses in the community. The children were cared for by the Sisters of Charity.

== Death ==
Andrew Carney died on Sunday, April 3, 1864. Over his life it is estimated that Carney gave $300,000 to support an unknown number of charities. His funeral was held at the Church of the Immaculate Conception and the services were attended by many prominent Bostonians including the Governor of Massachusetts, John Albion Andrew and members of his cabinet. Many Catholic business owners closed their businesses during the time of the Mass of Requiem out of respect for Carney. John McElroy, S.J., who had worked closely with Carney during the creation of Boston College gave the eulogy, part of which is recounted below:

”God alone knows his good acts and will reward him for them. I will say this, however, it would have been difficult to have carried on such extensive buildings as these, humanly speaking, if Divine Providence had not raised up for us a friend as Andrew Carney. His credit was always at our disposal.”

Carney was originally buried in the chapel located in Carney Hospital. His wife Pamelia, had the body exhumed and reinterred at the Forest Hills Cemetery in the Jamaica Plain neighborhood of Boston, Massachusetts.
