= Working Boys Home =

Historic orphanage in Massachusetts

- U.S. National Register of Historic Places
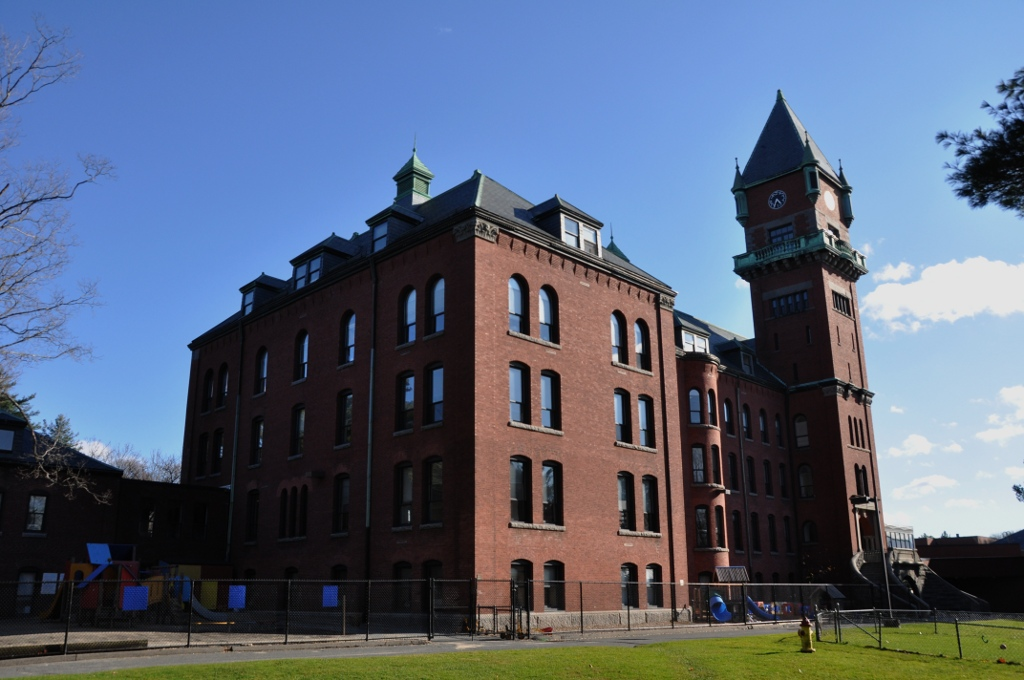

- Location within Massachusetts Location within the United States
- Location: 333 Nahanton St., Newton, Massachusetts
- Coordinates: 42°17′59″N 71°12′17″W
- Built: 1896
- Architect: McGintly, W.H. & J.A.
- Architectural style: Romanesque
- MPS: Newton MRA
- NRHP reference No.: 86001898
- Added to NRHP: September 04, 1986

The Working Boys Home is a historic orphanage building at 333 Nahanton Street in Newton, Massachusetts.

The four story Romanesque brick building was designed by church architects constructed William H. and John A. McGinty, and built in 1896. The building follows a rough H pattern, with a seven-story tower at the right front. The building's walls are red brick, with granite trim elements. The roof is slate, with copper flashing and two coppered cupolas. The building cost $300,000 to build, a large sum for the time, and very nearly bankrupted the organization, which provided housing for homeless boys in exchange for a share of their wages. The facility was managed by the Xaverian Brothers until the 1970s.

The building was listed on the National Register of Historic Places in 1986. The property is now the campus of the Leventhal-Sidman Jewish Community Center.

== See also ==
- National Register of Historic Places listings in Newton, Massachusetts
