= Thomas H. O'Connor =

Thomas H. O'Connor (1923-2012) was a professor and university historian of Boston College who published hundreds of books and academic papers on Boston, New England, and American history. O'Connor was known as "the dean of Boston historians".

== Biography ==
Thomas Henry O'Connor was born on December 9, 1922, in South Boston. He was one of three children of John F. O’Connor, a mail carrier, and Marie O'Connor (née Meany), an office worker. As a child he loved to read and was always interested in history. He attended Gate of Heaven elementary school in South Boston. In the eighth grade he won a citywide essay competition and was presented with a silver medal by Governor James Michael Curley. He attended Boston Latin School, working part-time at the Boston Public Library in Copley Square, and graduated in 1942. During his freshman year at Boston College, he joined the army and served in the China Burma India Theater during World War II. In 1946 he returned to his studies and his job at the library. He was also the staff cartoonist for The Stylus, the college's literary magazine, and The Heights, the student newspaper. In 1949 he married his co-worker at the library, Mary MacDonald.

In 1950 he received his master's degree from Boston College and was offered a teaching job, which he accepted. While teaching at Boston College he studied American History at Boston University, receiving his doctorate in 1957. He remained at Boston College for the rest of his life. He was chairman of the history department through the 1960s, became a professor emeritus in 1993, and in 1999 was named university historian. That same year, he received Boston Latin's Distinguished Alumnus Award and the Eire Society of Boston Gold Medal.

In addition to teaching at Boston College, Dr. O'Connor taught at the Harvard Extension School for many years, and served on the Massachusetts Archives Commission, the National Bicentennial Commission, and the Commission on the Bicentennial of the United States Constitution. He died at his home in Milton, Massachusetts, on May 20, 2012.

== Selected works ==
- Lincoln and the Cotton Trade. Iowa City : University of Iowa. 1961.
- The Heritage of the American People. Boston : Allyn and Bacon. 1965.
- Lords of the Loom: The Cotton Whigs and the Coming of the Civil War. New York : Scribner. 1968.
- The Disunited States: The Era of Civil War and Reconstruction. New York : Dodd, Mead and Company. 1972.
- Religion and American Society. Boston : Addison-Wesley. 1975
- Bibles, Brahmins, and Bosses: A Short History of Boston. Boston : Boston Public Library. 1976.
- Fitzpatrick's Boston, 1846-1866: John Bernard Fitzpatrick, Third Bishop of Boston. Boston : Northeastern University Press. 1984.
- South Boston, My Home Town: The History of an Ethnic Neighborhood. Boston : Quinlan Press. 1988.
- Building a New Boston: Politics and Urban Renewal, 1950-1970. Boston : Northeastern University Press. 1993.
- Boston Irish: A Political History. Boston : Northeastern University Press. 1995.
- Boston Catholics: A History of the Church and its People. Boston : Northeastern University Press. 1998.
- Civil War Boston: Home Front and Battlefield. Boston : Northeastern University Press. 1998.
- Boston A to Z. Cambridge, Massachusetts : Harvard University Press. 2000.
- The Hub: Boston Past and Present. Boston : Northeastern University Press. 2001.
- Eminent Bostonians. Cambridge : Harvard University Press. 2002.
- The Athens of America: Boston, 1825-1845. Amherst, Massachusetts : University of Massachusetts Press. 2006.
- Two Centuries of Faith: The Influence of Catholicism on Boston, 1808-2008. New York : Crossroad Pub. Co. 2009.
