= Eire Society of Boston =

Irish culture organization in the United States

Éire Society of Boston
- Formation: 1937; 89 years ago
- Purpose: Promotion of Irish culture
- Location: Boston, Massachusetts, USA
- Website: Official website

The Éire Society of Boston is an Irish cultural organization located in Boston, Massachusetts. The society was founded in 1937 with the goal of promoting the knowledge of Irish culture to a wider audience particularly in the United States of America.

== History ==
Éire Society was founded in 1937 by over 80 people who were attendees of a sixteen lecture course on Irish history which was organized by the Massachusetts Department of Education. Éire Society's stated mission is to "promote the knowledge of Irish culture through the encouragement of study in the arts, sciences, literature, language and the history of Ireland, and to raise awareness of the contributions to civilization made by the Irish and those of Irish ancestry". Historically, Éire Society has attempted to distinguish itself from other Irish organizations in the Greater Boston area such as the Charitable Irish Society by attempting to focus its events and programming on scholarship and academia. The Society has, from its founding, been open to both men and women and refused to have a religiouos affiliation. In its early days, Éire Society also did not extend membership to any person who was "holding or seeking" public office. The John F. Kennedy Presidential Library and Museum currently has John F. Kennedy's Éire Society membership card. The Society's records, dating mostly from 1937 to 1990, are held at the John J. Burns Library at Boston College.

== Gold medal ==
Each year the Society bestows its Gold Medal award to individuals they feel have made "significant contributions to benefit society and to their chosen fields of expertise". Recipients in entertainment have included filmmakers John Ford and John Huston, Irish actresses Siobhán McKenna, Anna Manahan and Maureen O'Hara, Irish poet Seamus Heaney, and musicians The Chieftains and Tommy Makem. Politicians include: Mary Robinson, Thomas P. O'Neill, Charles Haughey, George J. Mitchell and U.S. Ambassadors to Ireland William V. Shannon and Jean Kennedy Smith, former Speaker of the U.S. House of Representatives John W. McCormack and President John F. Kennedy (in 1957). Academics, cultural and fine arts awardees include: Charles Donagh Maginnis, Thomas H. O'Connor, Robert Keating O'Neill, Desmond Guinness and Padraig O'Malley.

Recent recipients of the Éire Society's gold medal also include

- Boston Globe columnist Kevin Cullen in 2023,
- Fintan O'Toole in 2024
- Monica McWilliams in 2025
- Jim and Caroilin Callery in 2026.
