= Mary O'Connell (nurse) =

Sister Anthony SC
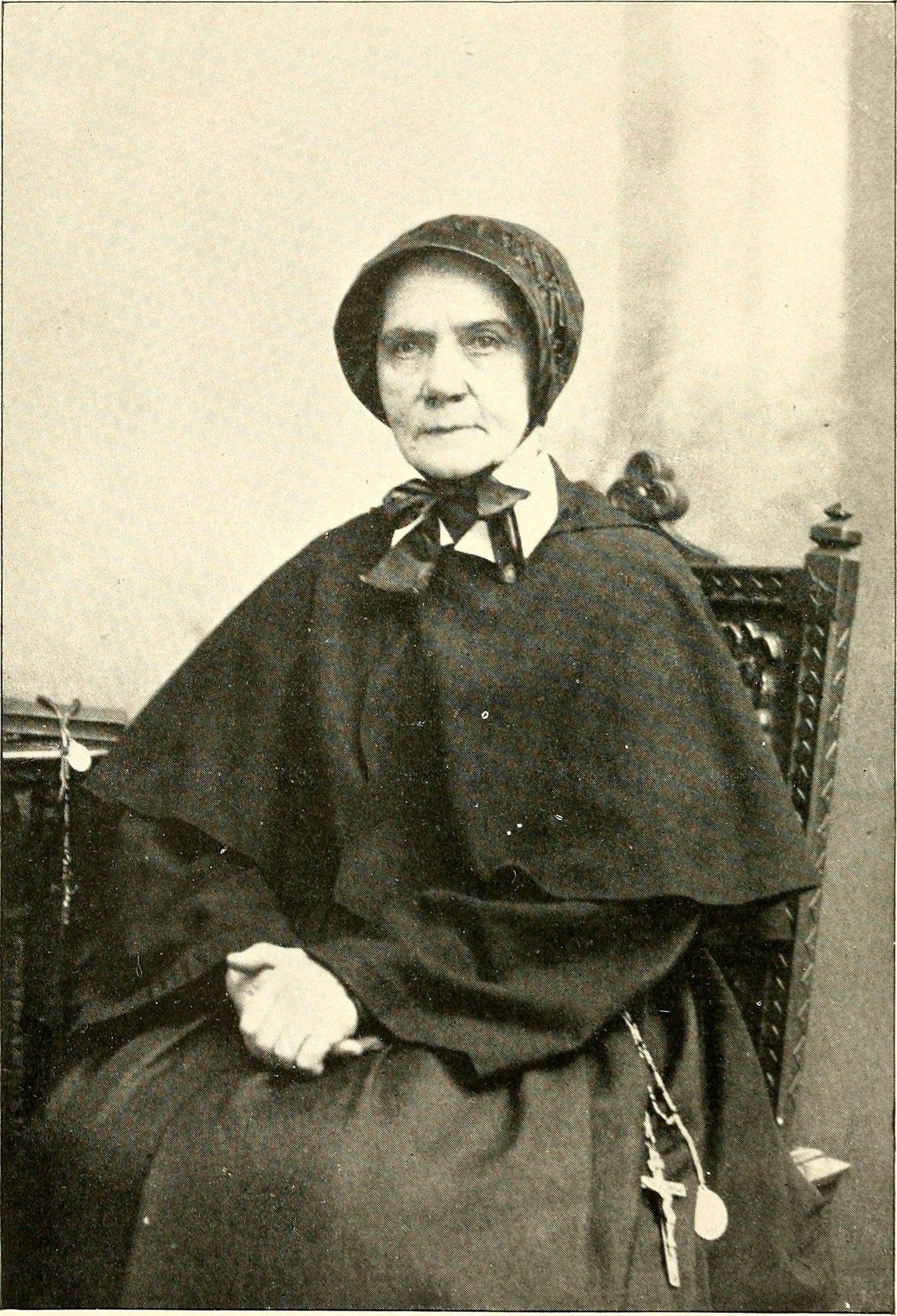
- Sister Anthony, from an 1897 publication.
- Born: Mary Ellen O'Connell; 1814; Limerick, Ireland
- Died: December 8, 1897 (aged 82–83); Cincinnati, Ohio
- Other name: Sister Anthony

Mary O'Connell, SC (better known as Sister Anthony) (1814 – December 8, 1897) was an Irish immigrant to the United States, who became a Catholic religious sister. A Sister of Charity of Cincinnati, she served with distinction as a nurse on the front lines of the American Civil War. Her work with the wounded and in health care in general caused her to be known as "the angel of the battlefield" and "the Florence Nightingale of America." Her portrait hangs in the Smithsonian Institution in Washington, DC.

== Biography ==
Mary Ellen O'Connell was born in Limerick, Ireland, in 1814, the daughter of William O'Connell (1769-1841) and Catherine Murphy (-1821). In 1821, she emigrated with her family to Boston, and attended the Ursuline Academy in Charlestown, Massachusetts. She would have witnessed the Ursuline Convent riots. On June 5, 1835 she entered the novitiate of the American Sisters of Charity in St. Joseph's Valley, Maryland, founded by Saint Elizabeth Seton, and was professed in 1837, taking the name of Sister Anthony. Soon after, she went to Cincinnati, Ohio.

Sister Anthony arrived in Cincinnati in 1837 to begin her work at St. Peter's Orphan Asylum and School for girls. Given charge of St. Joseph's Orphan Asylum for boys when it was begun in 1852, she later oversaw the combining of the two asylums in the Cincinnati neighborhood of Cumminsville. She was in Cincinnati through 1852, when the Sisters in Cincinnati became independent of their founding motherhouse in Emmitsburg, Maryland. She was placed in charge of St. John's Hostel for Invalids, a new hospital.

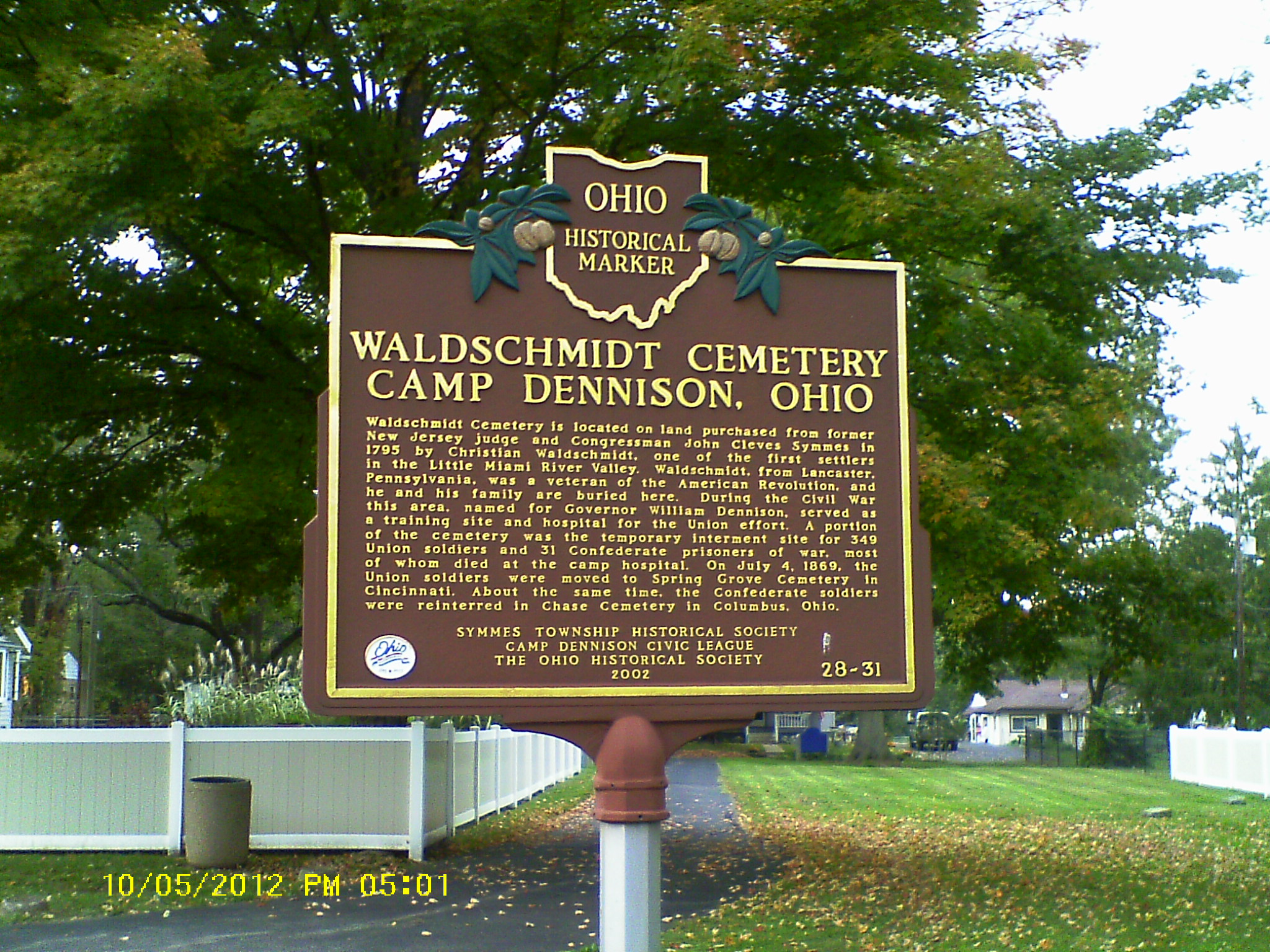
Camp Dennison

At the outbreak of the American Civil War, the Sisters volunteered as nurses. More than one-third of the community, which by then had more than one hundred members, served. In June 1861 Sister O'Connell was one of six Sisters of Charity who went to Camp Dennison, about 15 miles from Cincinnati. A request was made from Cumberland, Virginia for nursing assistance, and eight sisters were sent to serve the wounded of both armies.

The battle of Shiloh brought ten sisters to the scene, including Sr. Anthony. Some describe Sr. Anthony's word as being law with officers, doctors, and soldiers once she had established herself as a prudent and trusted administrator and nurse. She and other sisters often were picked to treat wounded prisoners of war since they showed no bias in serving rebel, yank, white, or black soldiers.

When she served at Shiloh she became known as the "Angel of the Battlefield". Sister O'Connell went out to the battlefield to help bring in the sick and dying. Sister Anthony developed the Battlefield Triage. Her method was "the first recognizably modern triage techniques in war zones, saved countless lives through faster hospital treatment and won her praise from President Lincoln". Her medical skills allowed her to intervene to save soldiers' limbs from amputation.

Sister Anthony also served at the battlefields of Winchester, Virginia; the Cumberland Gap, Tennessee, Richmond, Virginia, Nashville, Tennessee, Gallipolis, Ohio, Culpeper Court House, Virginia, Murfreesboro, Tennessee, Pittsburg Landing, Tennessee, and Lynchburg, Virginia.

She also served on a hospital ship on the Ohio River. Anthony O'Connell saw no distinction between Union and Confederate soldiers. She became personally acquainted with Jefferson Davis and knew a number of generals on both sides of the conflict.

After the war, in 1866, Joseph C. Butler and a friend, Louis Worthington, purchased a large building at Sixth and Lock Street, to present to Sister Anthony as a gift in recognition of the sisters service during the war. There were two conditions: that no one be excluded from the hospital because of color or religion, and that the hospital be named "The Hospital of the Good Samaritan," to honor the sisters' kindness. It opened the same year as the St. Joseph Foundling and Maternity Hospital. It still serves as St. Joseph Hospital, a residential facility for children and adults with severe mental and multiple physical disabilities.

Sister Anthony was also recognized for her work during the yellow fever epidemic of 1877. She retired from active service in 1880, and died in 1897 in Cumminsville, Cincinnati, Ohio.
