= The Pilot (Massachusetts newspaper) =

Official newspaper of the Archdiocese of Boston

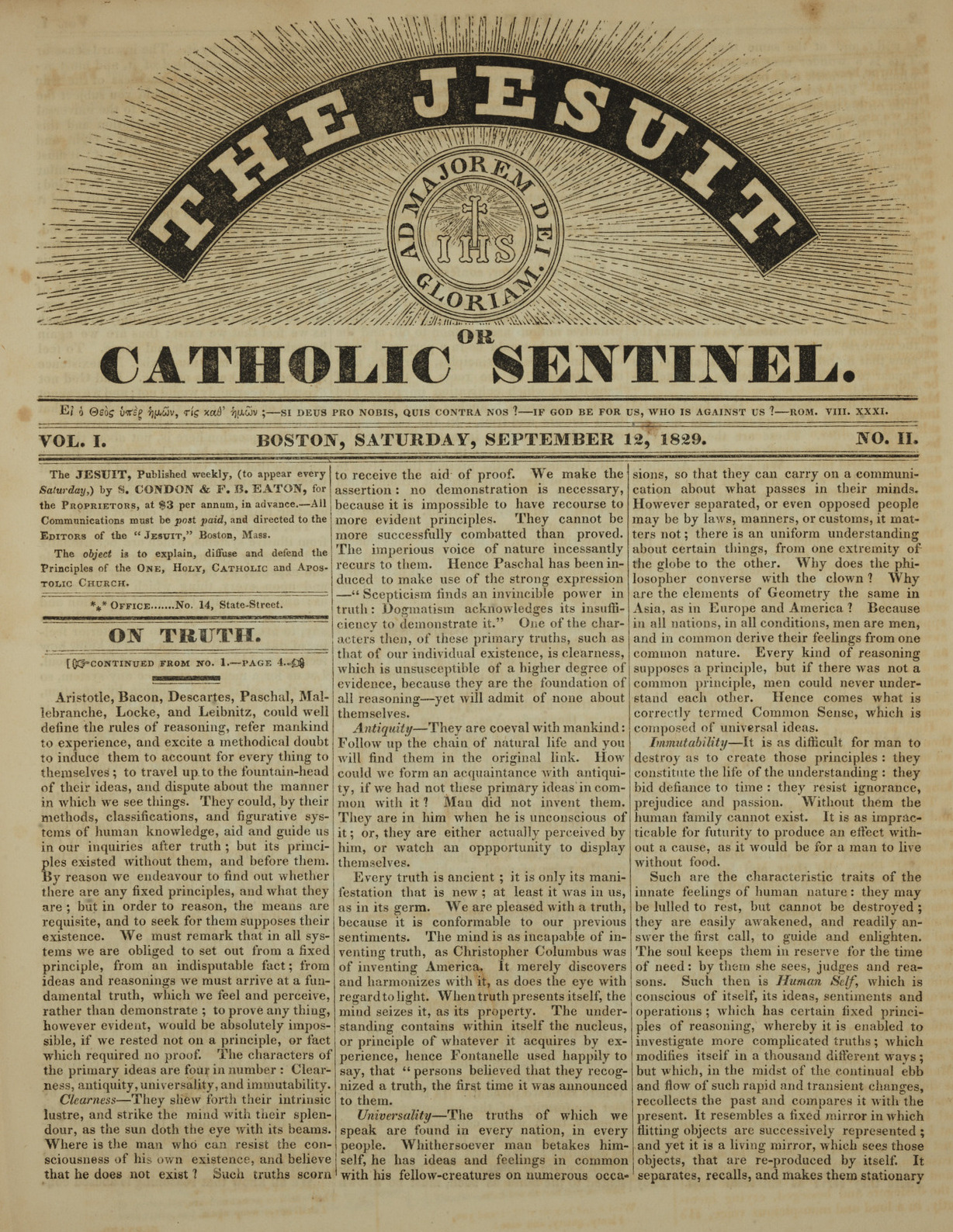
- Front page, September 12, 1829
- Type: Weekly newspaper
- Format: Tabloid
- Owner: Roman Catholic Archdiocese of Boston
- Publisher: Cardinal Seán Patrick O'Malley
- Editor: Antonio M. Enrique
- Managing editor: Gregory L. Tracy
- Founded: September 5, 1829; 196 years ago
- Headquarters: Braintree, Massachusetts
- Circulation: 26,000
- ISSN: 0744-933X
- Website: thebostonpilot.com

The Pilot, also known as The Boston Pilot, is an American periodical that serves as the official newspaper of the Archdiocese of Boston in Massachusetts. It claims the title of "America's oldest Catholic newspaper", having been in continuous publication since its first issue on September 5, 1829.

== History ==
The paper ran its first issue in on September 5, 1829, under the leadership of Benedict Joseph Fenwick, the second bishop of Boston, at a time of increased Irish immigration to the United States and rising anti-Catholic animus to the newcomers' church. In its first edition, Bishop Fenwick wrote that the newspaper's purpose was to defend against the "crying calumnies and gross misrepresentations which in this section of the country have been so long, so unsparingly, so cruelly heaped upon the Church."

Beginning as The Jesuit or Catholic Sentinel, the newspaper's name was changed several times in its first seven years. Titles included The Jesuit, The United States Catholic Intelligencer, and The Literary and Catholic Sentinel.

In 1834, Fenwick sold the publication to two laymen—Henry Devereux, the publisher, and Patrick Donahoe, an employee who quickly became the newspaper's sole proprietor. By 1836, Patrick Donahoe changed the name of the newspaper to The Boston Pilot, partly in tribute to the Dublin Pilot. In 1838, Donahoe became editor, and he maintained control of the newspaper until his death in 1901. During much of the 19th century, The Pilot acquired a reputation of being an Irish-American cultural newspaper. The great majority of Boston's Catholics were originally immigrants from Ireland, with tens of thousands arriving during and after the Great Famine. Notable editors linked to the movement for Irish independence include John Boyle O'Reilly, James Jeffrey Roche and Thomas D'Arcy McGee.

In 1858, the newspaper's Old English nameplate The Pilot appeared for the first time, under the editorship of Father Joseph M. Finotti, along with the motto, "Be just and fear not, let all the ends thou aim'st at be thy God's, thy Country's and Truth's". Despite the fact that the name The Pilot and its logo have remained essentially unchanged for over 150 years, it is not uncommon for the newspaper to be referred to as The Boston Pilot to this day.

Archbishop William Henry O'Connell purchased the paper in 1908 and turned it into the official voice of Boston's archdiocese. He closely monitored its editorial policies and sought to promote its readership among local Catholic families. In 1979, The Pilot celebrated its 150th anniversary and featured special information about the newspaper's history. As of 2004, its circulation was of 23,039 printed copies.

In 2006, the newspaper launched its online edition, TheBostonPilot.com, which offers expanded content and multimedia features.
