= Julia O'Connor =

American labor leader (1890–1972)

Julia O'Connor Parker
- Born: Julia Sarsfield O'Connor; 1890; Woburn, Massachusetts
- Died: 1972; Boston, MA
- Known for: International Brotherhood of Electrical Workers (IBEW)
- Spouse: Charles Austin Parker

Julia Sarsfield O'Connor (1890–1972) was an American labor leader and head of the National Telephone Operators' Department of the International Brotherhood of Electrical Workers (IBEW). She spent her entire forty-five-year career in the labor movement.

== Early life ==
Julia O'Connor was born in Woburn, Massachusetts, the daughter of Irish immigrants John and Sarah (Conneally) O'Connor as one of four children. After graduating from high school in 1908, she became a telephone operator in Boston and joined the Boston Telephone Operators' Union in 1912. She joined the executive board of the Boston office of the National Women's Trade Union League (WTUL), and was elected president of the Boston WTUL from 1915 to 1918. She also became president of Boston Local 1A of the National Telephone Operators' Department in 1918.

== World War I and nationalization of the telephone industry ==
On August 1, 1918, after the entry of the United States into World War I, the U.S. government took control of the nation's telephone and telegraph industries, and placed them under the management of Postmaster General Albert Burleson. A commission was set up under the leadership of Post Office official William S. Ryan to handle labor relations. The Ryan Commission consisted of five members – two from the telephone industry, two from the government, and one labor representative. Julia O'Connor was appointed to represent labor on the commission. However, after only a few months, O'Connor resigned in early 1919, charging that the commission had demonstrated a hostile attitude toward the telephone and telegraph workers.

While serving on the Ryan Commission, O'Connor was discharged from her position as operator for the New England Telephone Company, which claimed that her absences were excessive. However, she then was able to devote more time to union activities as president of Local 1A of the IBEW Telephone Operators' Department.

== Telephone Operators' Strike of 1919 ==
In April 1919, members of the Telephone Operators' Department who worked for the New England Telephone Company went out on strike after the Ryan Commission had failed to act on demands for wage adjustments. The strike, called by O'Connor on April 15, caused disruption in telephone service across the entire New England area. After five days, Postmaster General Burleson agreed to negotiate an agreement between the union and the telephone company, resulting in an increase in pay for the operators and recognition of the right to bargain collectively.

== 1923 Telephone Operators' Strike ==
In June 1923, another strike was called by the New England Council of Telephone Operators' Unions against the New England Telephone Company after demands for pay increases, reduction in working hours, and improvement in working conditions had not been met. Support for the strike was weakened, however, by disputes between O'Connor as head of the National Telephone Operators' Department and the leadership of the Boston Local 1A, resulting in the expulsion of the Boston local from the national union. The strike was called off after less than a month without achieving any of its goals.

The Telephone Operators' Department of the IBEW experienced a sharp decline in membership after the 1923 strike, due in part to the introduction of dial telephones. Loss of members to company unions also played a part. The National Telephone Operators' Department was finally disbanded in 1938.

== Later life ==
Julia O'Connor married Charles Austin Parker, a reporter for the Boston Herald, in 1925. Upon the birth of their first child a year later, she resigned her position on the executive board of the WTUL. However, she remained active in WTUL activities in Boston in the 1930s. She became an organizer for the American Federation of Labor in 1939, and moved to New York City to help organize Western Union workers. She returned to Boston in 1947 and continued to work as a labor organizer until her retirement in 1957. She died in Boston in 1972.
