= National Lancers =

Massachusetts military unit

- The National Lancers logo
- Country: United States
- Allegiance: Massachusetts
- Type: Cavalry
- Role: Ceremonial; Search and rescue
- Part of: Massachusetts Organized Militia
- Garrison/HQ: Framingham, Massachusetts
- Mottos: Union, Liberty and the Law
- Anniversaries: 31 October 1836
- Engagements: American Civil War: Battle of Antietam; Battle of Cold Harbor; Battle of Fredericksburg; Battle of Gettysburg; Siege of Petersburg; Battle of Spottsylvania; Battle of the Wilderness; World War I: Second Battle of the Marne; Battle of Lorraine; Battle of Argonne Forest; Battle of Saint-Mihiel
- Website: nationallancers.org

Commanders
- Current commander: Brigadier General Richard Reale, Jr.

The National Lancers are a Massachusetts-based volunteer cavalry militia troop. The National Lancers, along with the Massachusetts National Guard and the Massachusetts State Defense Force, exists as a component of the Massachusetts Organized Militia.

== History ==
The Lancers were organized on 31 October 1836 at the request of Governor Edward Everett and organized as a light cavalry militia troop. The Lancers were created to provide an armed escort for the governor as well as protect Massachusetts against invasion and insurrection.

The National Lancers fought in the American Civil War as a part of the Army of the Potomac designated as Companies C and D, 1st Massachusetts Volunteer Cavalry. The Lancers took part in campaigns in South Carolina, Virginia, Maryland and Pennsylvania. During the Boston Draft Riot in July 1863, the National Lancers prevented rioters from seizing the armory of the Boston Light Artillery.

In June 1916, the Lancers - along with the rest of the 1st Squadron of Cavalry of the Massachusetts National Guard - were federalized and deployed to Texas in support of the Pancho Villa Expedition. In April 1917, the Lancers were re-designated as the Company A, 102d Machine Gun Battalion, 26th Division and subsequently deployed to France to fight in World War I. The unit was disbanded at Camp Devens in April 1919.

After the end of World War I, the National Lancers was reorganized, with one troop remaining an official part of the Massachusetts National Guard and the other becoming a purely ceremonial unit. In 1940 the National Guard unit was re-designated as Battery A, 180th Field Artillery.

On 6 July 1964, Governor Endicott Peabody passed a bill officially designating the National Lancers as an official component of the Organized Massachusetts Militia.

== Duties ==
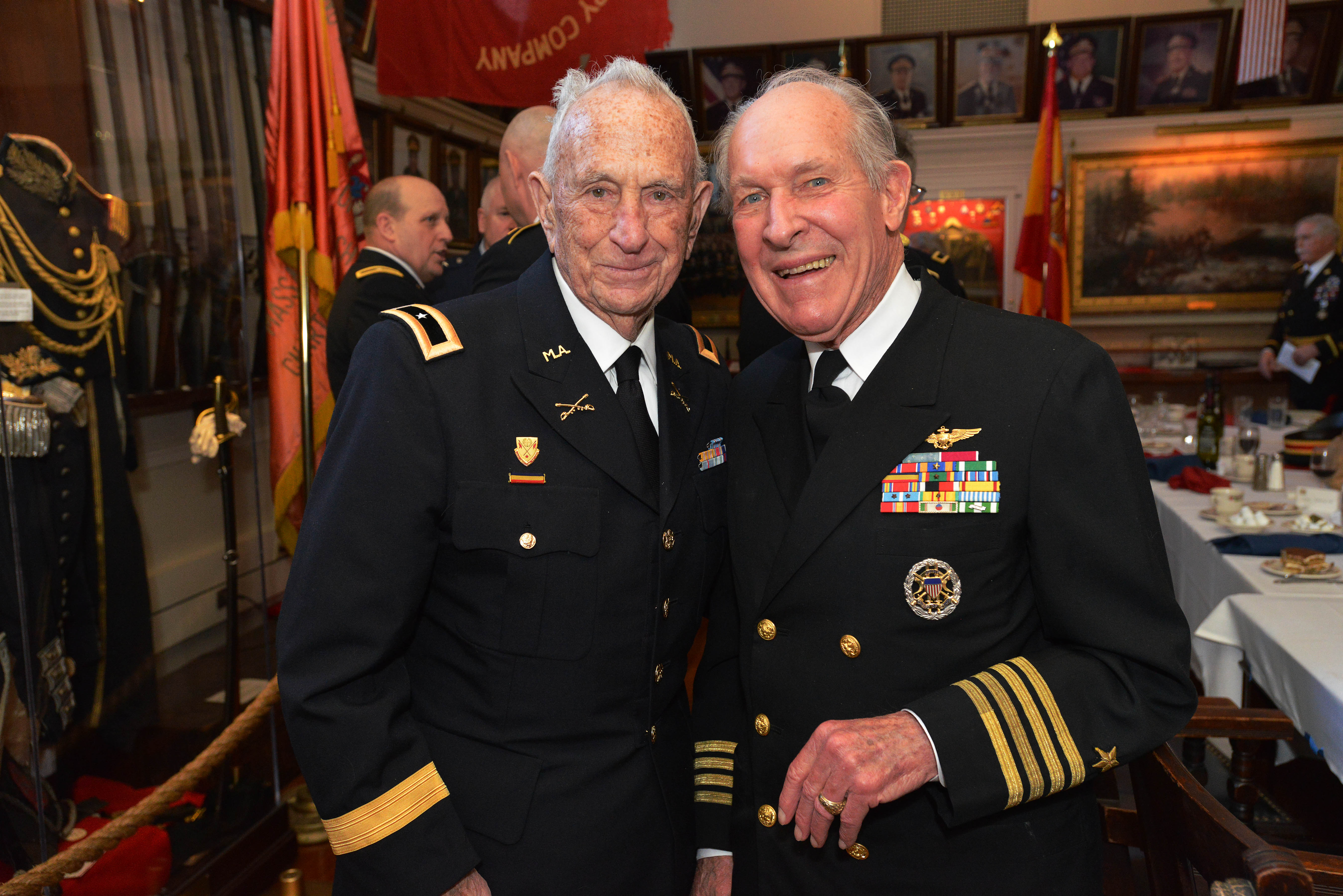
Brig. Gen. (MA) Mario DiCarlo, commander, National Lancers, and Retired U.S. Navy Capt. Thomas Hudner in 2014.

The National Lancers serve as both the ceremonial cavalry of the Massachusetts Organized Militia and as a search and rescue unit. In July 2004, the National Lancers were ordered into active state service to guard Camp Curtis Guild during the 2004 Democratic National Convention. In their ceremonial capacity, the Lancers annually reenact the ride of Paul Revere and William Dawes.

== Legal status ==
The National Lancers are recognized as a component of the Massachusetts Organized Militia under Massachusetts state law.

== See also ==
- Ancient and Honorable Artillery Company of Massachusetts
- Massachusetts Naval Militia
- Massachusetts Wing Civil Air Patrol
