= Home for Destitute Catholic Children =

Temporary home for children in Massachusetts, US

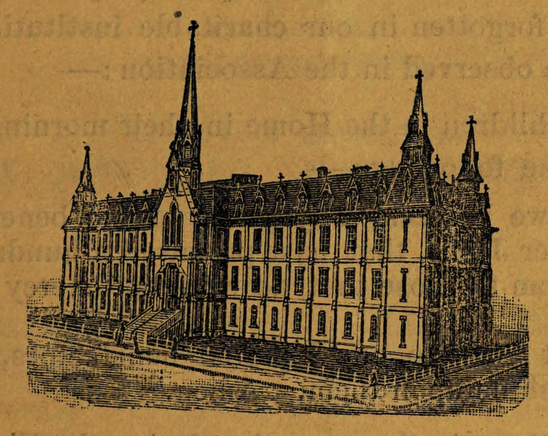
Home for Destitute Catholic Children (1881)

Home for Destitute Catholic Children, Boston was a temporary home in Boston, Massachusetts, for destitute and neglected children, aged 4 to 12, of any race, creed, or nationality. The Home was incorporated in 1891, succeeding the Association for the Protection of Destitute Roman Catholic Children in Boston, incorporated in 1864.

No children were received for pay. Members of the Sisters of Charity instructed and cared for the children until they returned to their friends, placed in situations, or provided with a Catholic home, the Home continuing its oversight. The Home could be appointed guardian of any child. Persons wishing to adopt a child from the Home were required to bring recommendations from their parish priest.

== History ==
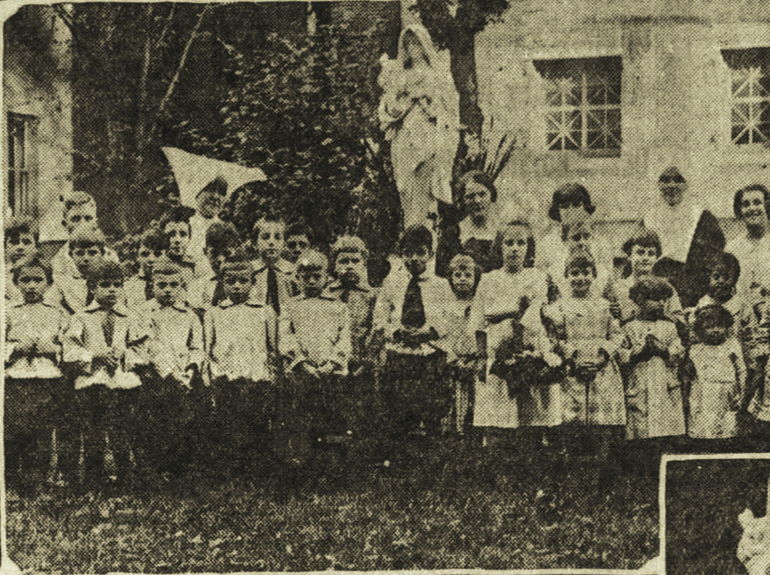
Home for Destitute Catholic Children (1923)

The Home and the work of the association grew out of the Eliot Charity School, founded by a Protestant, Samuel Eliot, on November 25, 1850, and for some time conducted at No. 9 High Street. The general management was held by a Board of Managers representing the different parishes of Boston and vicinity. Soon after the Sisters of Charity assumed the direction of its affairs, which was in 1866, the institution was removed to No. 10 Common Street.

In June 1867, a lot of 50,606 square feet (4,701.5 m^{2}) on Harrison Avenue, opposite the Church of the Immaculate Conception was purchased, and in October 1870, the cornerstone of the structure at Harrison Avenue, East Concord and Stoughton streets was laid. It opened in the following year at a cost of more than US$100,000. The Home was supported altogether by voluntary subscriptions, and an annual Charity Ball was given for its benefit.

In 1890, it had 225. Income in that year from charitable contributions was US$10,428. From legacies, US$4,086; from entertainments, US$668; miscellaneous, US$773; total income, US$15,957. Expenditures were US$15,597. Real estate occupied, US$140,000; mortgaged for US$150,000.

The report for year ending January 10, 1905 indicated that 1,152 children had been aided in that year, and that the number of beds was 255. There were ten paid officers or employees. The value of property owned and occupied for corporate purposes was US$140,000; and the value of investments was US$13,400.

The report for year ending January 13, 1910, indicated that 1,698 children had been aided in that year, and that the number of beds was 290. There were ten paid officers or employees. Total expenses were US$25,413; value of property owned and occupied for corporate purposes was US$140,000; and the value of investments was US$61,599. By this year, more than 26,000 children had been cared for in the Home.

== Architecture and fittings ==
The Homebuilding was well arranged for its purpose. It was 175 by 50 feet (53 m × 15 m), and three stories high, with a French roof. It had schoolrooms, playrooms, dormitories, infirmaries, bathrooms, and dining rooms, affording ample accommodation for more than 200 children at one time.

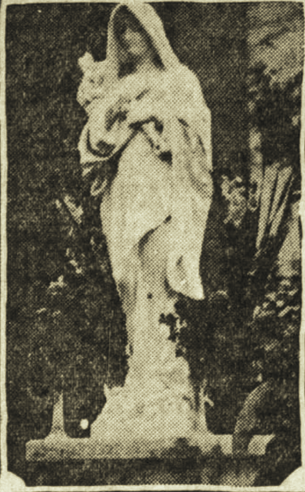
Statue of Our Lady of Purity (1923)

A statue of Our Lady of Purity, made of Italian marble, was mounted on a cement pedestal and occupied a prominent place in the gardens where it could be seen from the home building.

== Gallery ==
Annual reports of the Association for the Protection of Destitute Roman Catholic Children in Boston, From January 10, 1879, to January 13, 1881

Home for Destitute Catholic Children Annual Statement, January 13, 1887, to January 12, 1888
