= John Hanson (disambiguation) =

John Hanson (1715–1783) was President of the American Continental Congress.

John Hanson may also refer to:

== People ==
- John Wesley Hanson (1823–1901), American Universalist minister and historian
- John Fletcher Hanson (1840–1910), American industrialist
- John L. Hanson Jr. (b. circa 1950) is an American radio broadcaster, disc jockey, and interviewer
- John Hanson (Liberian politician) (died 1860), Liberian senator associated with American Colonization Society
- Sir John Hanson (1919–1996), 3rd Baronet, of the Hanson baronets
- John Hanson (singer) (1922–1998), Canadian-born British singer and actor
- John Hanson (British diplomat) (1938–2017), British diplomat
- John Hanson (English footballer) (born 1962), English former footballer
- John Hanson (New Zealand footballer) (fl. 1988), New Zealand international football (soccer) player
- John Hanson (director) (fl. 1978–1987), American film director
- John Hanson (born 1973), British electronic musician in the band Magnétophone
- John Hanson (Jamaican politician), planter and politician in Jamaica

== Other uses ==
- Statue of John Hanson, a 1903 bronze statue
- John Hanson Community School in Andover, Hampshire, UK

== See also ==
- John Hansson (disambiguation)
- John Hansen (disambiguation)
