= John Hansen =

John or Johnny Hansen may refer to:

== Sports ==
- John Hansen (footballer, born 1924) (1924–1990), Danish Olympic footballer (BK Frem, Juventus, Lazio)
- John Hansen (footballer, born 1950), Scottish footballer (Partick Thistle)
- John Hansen (footballer, born 1973), Danish footballer (Esbjerg fB, Cambridge United)
- John Hansen (footballer, born 1974), Faroese international footballer (KÍ Klaksvík)
- John Hansen (rower) (born 1938), Danish Olympic rower
- Johnny Hansen (footballer, born 1943), Danish international footballer (Vejle BK, Bayern Munich)
- Johnny Hansen (footballer, born 1964), Danish international footballer (Ikast FS, Sturm Graz)
- Johnny Hansen (footballer, born 1966), Danish international footballer (Odense BK, Silkeborg IF, AFC Ajax)
- Jonny Hanssen (footballer) (born 1972), Norwegian international footballer
- Jonny Hansen (footballer) (born 1981), Norwegian footballer

== Other ==
- John Hansen (judge) (born 1945), New Zealand High Court Judge
- Johnny Hansen (musician) (born 1965), guitarist of Danish band Kandis
- John Hansen (voice actor), American voice actor
- John Hansen (Wisconsin politician) (1917–2015), Wisconsin politician
- John R. Hansen (1901–1974), U.S. Representative from Iowa
- John H.L. Hansen (born 1959), American speech technologist
- John P. Hansen (born 1943), Michigan politician

== See also ==
- John Hanson (disambiguation)
