= Colonel Thomas Cass =

Colonel Thomas Cass may refer to:

- Thomas Cass (colonel)
  - Statue of Thomas Cass, called Colonel Thomas Cass
