= John McGraw (politician) =

2nd governor of Washington

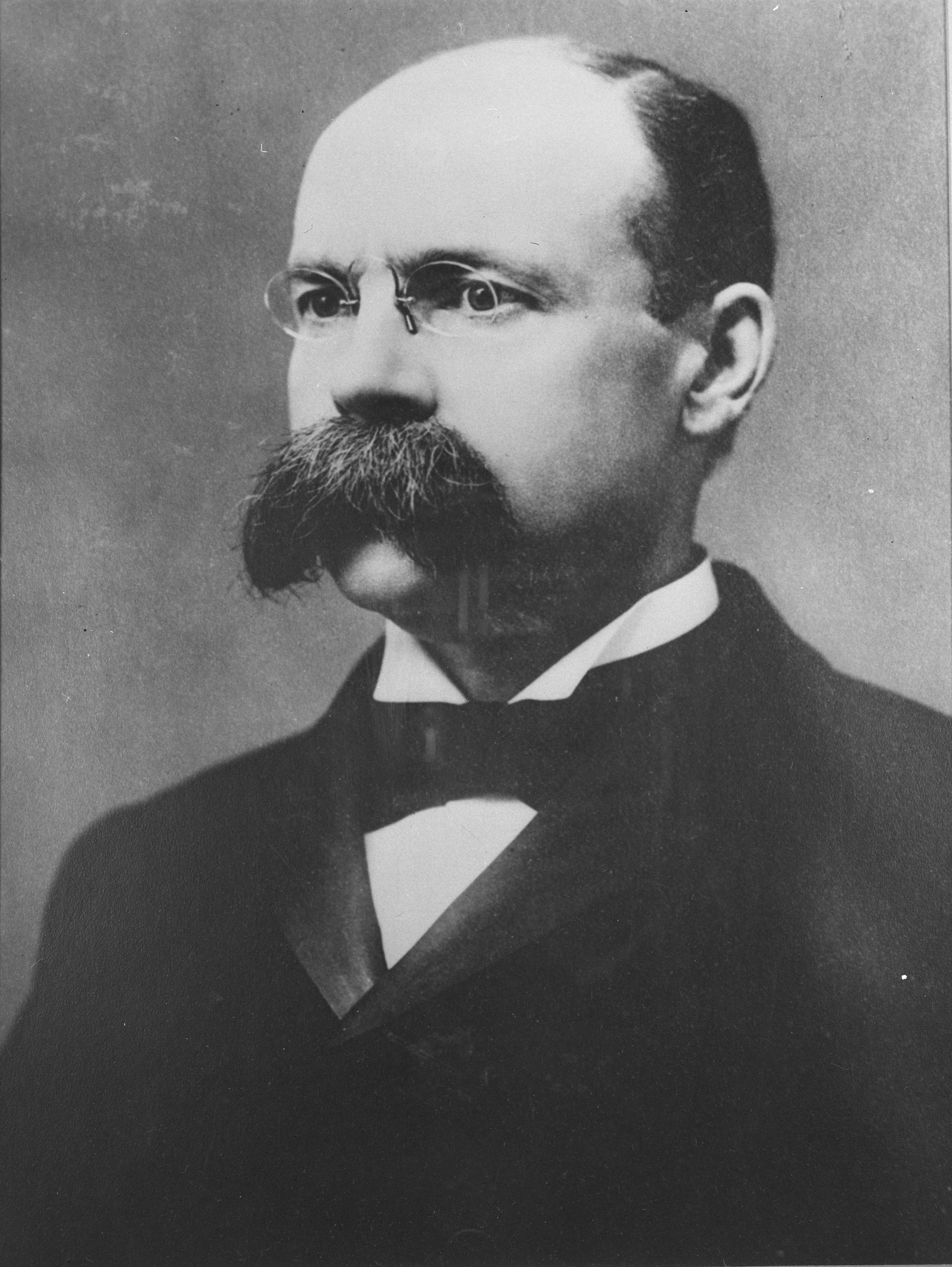
- McGraw c. 1893–1897

2nd Governor of Washington
- In office January 11, 1893 – January 13, 1897
- Lieutenant: F. H. Luce
- Preceded by: Elisha P. Ferry
- Succeeded by: John Rankin Rogers

Personal details
- Born: John Harte McGraw; October 4, 1850 Penobscot County, Maine, U.S.
- Died: June 23, 1910 (aged 59) Seattle, Washington, U.S.
- Party: Republican
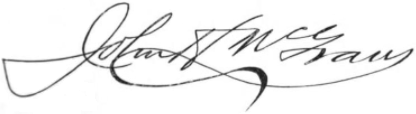
- Signature

John Harte McGraw (October 4, 1850 – June 23, 1910) was an American attorney, businessman, and politician who served as the second governor of Washington from 1893 to 1897.

== Biography ==
McGraw was born in Penobscot County, Maine and arrived in Washington in December 1876. He served as Republican governor January 9, 1893 - January 11, 1897. Previously he was chief of the Seattle Police Department and was also sheriff of King County, Washington during the Seattle riot of 1886.

McGraw, a law graduate, had also been President of Seattle First National Bank and Seattle Chamber of Commerce. After leaving office, he made money during the Klondike Gold Rush, much needed since he had to repay the State $10,000 following an investigation into his term of office.

He died from typhoid fever in Seattle on June 23, 1910.

A bronze statue of McGraw sculpted by Richard E. Brooks in 1913 stands at McGraw Square in Seattle.

Party political offices
Preceded by Elisha P. Ferry	Republican nominee for Governor of Washington; 1892	Succeeded by Potter C. Sullivan
Political offices
Preceded by Elisha P. Ferry (R)	Governors of Washington; 1893– 1897	Succeeded by John Rogers (D)
