= John Hansson =

John Hansson may refer to:

- John Hansson Steelman (1655–1749), fur trader and interpreter
- Johnny Hansson (born 1989), Swedish Strongman

== See also ==
- John Hanson (disambiguation)
