= Thomas Cass =

Thomas Cass may refer to:

- Thomas Cass (colonel) (1821–1862), founder and commander of the 9th Regiment Massachusetts Volunteer Infantry of the Union Army
- Thomas Cass (surveyor) (1817–1895), pioneer surveyor in New Zealand
