= Hanson-Thomas Houses =

Historic house in Maryland, United States

- Formerly listed on the U.S. National Register of Historic Places
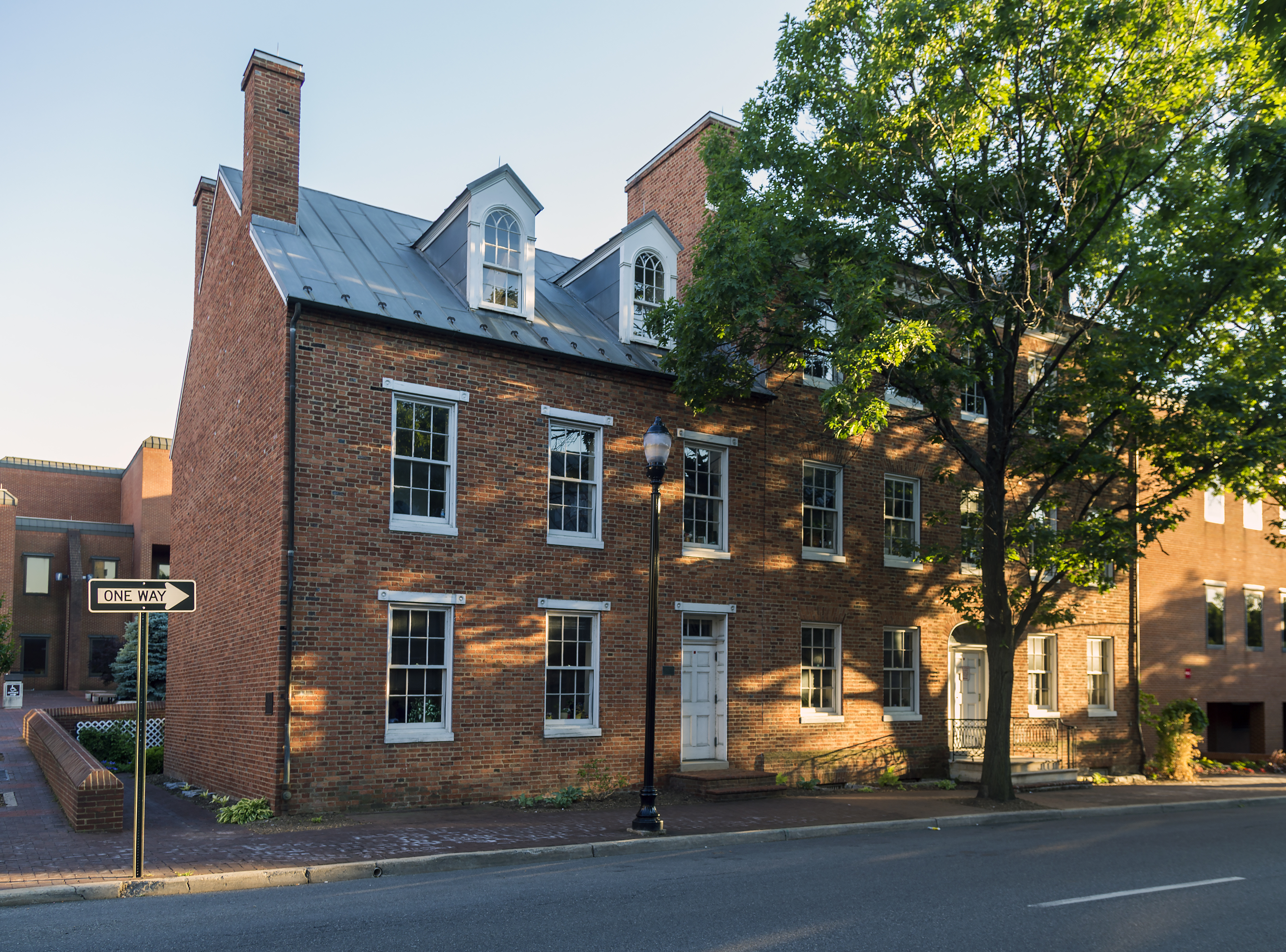
- John Hanson House (reconstructed), June 2014

- Location within Maryland Location within the United States
- Location: 108 and 110 W. Patrick St., Frederick, Maryland
- Coordinates: 39°24′54″N 77°24′36″W
- Area: 1 acre (0.40 ha)
- Built: 1775
- Architectural style: Federal
- NRHP reference No.: 72000579

Significant dates
- Added to NRHP: January 20, 1972
- Removed from NRHP: March 4, 1982

Hanson-Thomas Houses were two adjoining historic homes located at Frederick, Frederick County, Maryland, United States. They were adjoining three-story, brick dwellings, with Federal-style details. They were the homes of two Maryland patriots, one of whom, John Hanson (1715-1783), was President of the United States In Congress Assembled (1781-1782). The adjoining home was that of John Hanson's son-in-law, Dr. Philip Thomas (1747-1812), a prominent physician in Frederick County.

The houses were listed on the National Register of Historic Places in 1972, and delisted in 1982, after being partially demolished for reconstruction.
