= 9th Massachusetts Infantry Regiment =

9th Regiment Massachusetts Volunteer Infantry
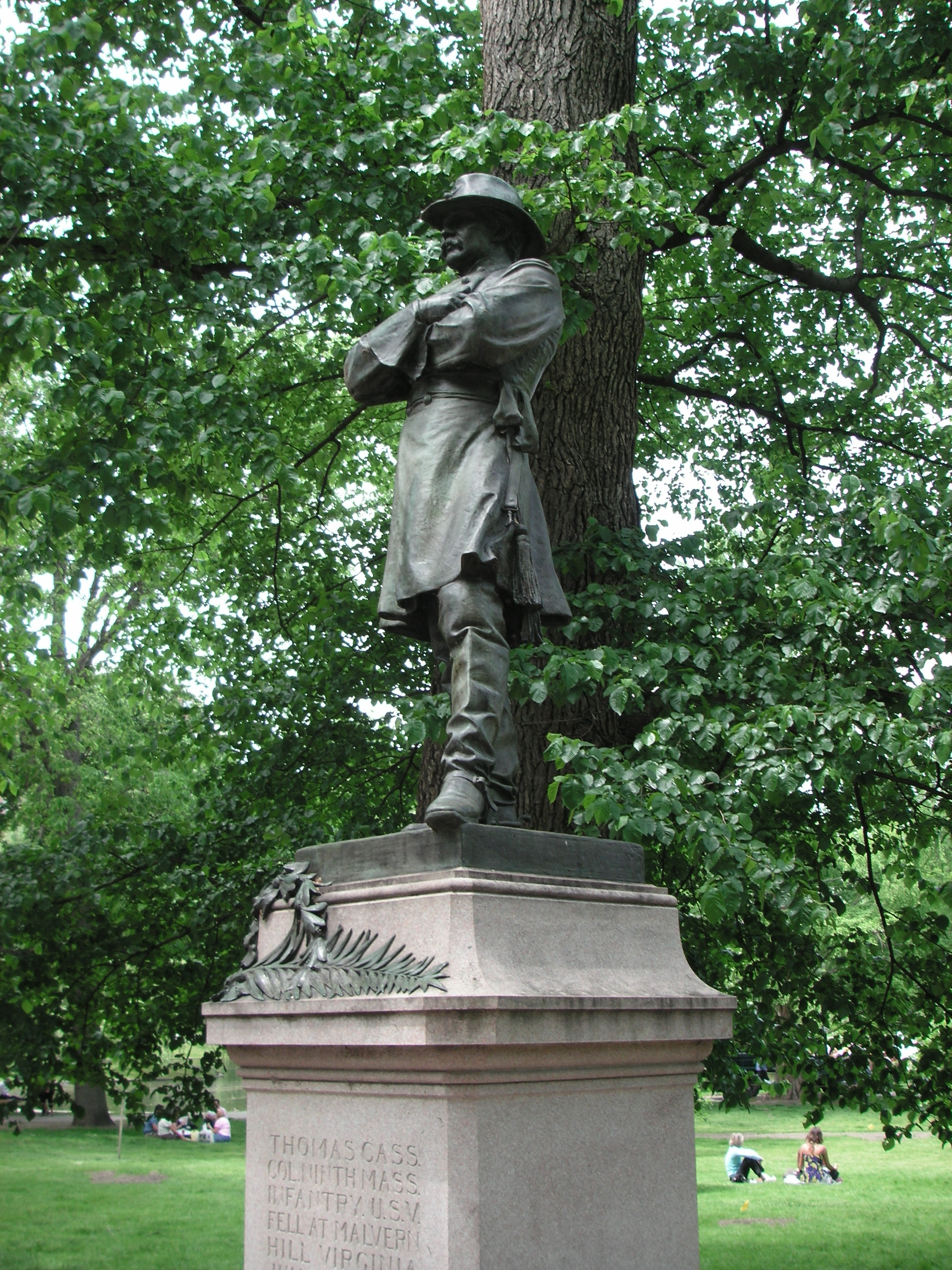
- Statue of Colonel Thomas Cass standing in the Boston Public Garden
- Active: 11 June 1861 – 21 June 1864
- Country: United States of America
- Allegiance: Union
- Branch: United States Army
- Type: Infantry
- Size: 1,650
- Part of: In 1863: Sweitzer's Brigade, Barnes's Division, V Corps, Army of the Potomac
- Motto: "The Fighting Ninth"
- Engagements: Siege of Yorktown; Battle of Hanover Court House; Battle of Mechanicsville; Battle of Gaines's Mill; Battle of Malvern Hill; Second Battle of Bull Run; Battle of Antietam; Battle of Fredericksburg; Mud March; Battle of Chancellorsville; Battle of Gettysburg; Bristoe Campaign; Battle of the Wilderness; Battle of Spotsylvania Court House; Battle of Cold Harbor

Commanders
- Notable commanders: Col. Thomas Cass; Col. Patrick Robert Guiney

Insignia
- V Corps badge

The 9th Regiment Massachusetts Volunteer Infantry was a military unit from Boston, Massachusetts, USA, part of the Army of the Potomac during the American Civil War. It is also known as "The Fighting Ninth". It existed from 1861 to 1864 and participated in several key battles during the war. The unit is an Irish heritage unit, with many volunteers having been born in Ireland.

== History ==
The Ninth Regiment was created on 11 June 1861 under the command of Colonel Thomas Cass in Boston recruiting primarily Irish-Americans. Initial funding for the regiment came from Patrick Donahoe, publisher of The Boston Pilot. Initially barracked at Boston's Faneuil Hall, they soon were sent to Camp Wightman on Long Island in Boston Harbor for training. On 25 June 1861, the regiment received the National Colors and Regimental colors from Governor Andrew and officers of local Irish organizations at Faneuil Hall. The Regimental colors were a green silk flag with the US coat of arms and a scroll saying, "Thy sons by adoption; thy firm supporters and defenders from duty, affection, and choice." On the other side was the Irish Harp and the motto, "The Union must and shall be preserved."

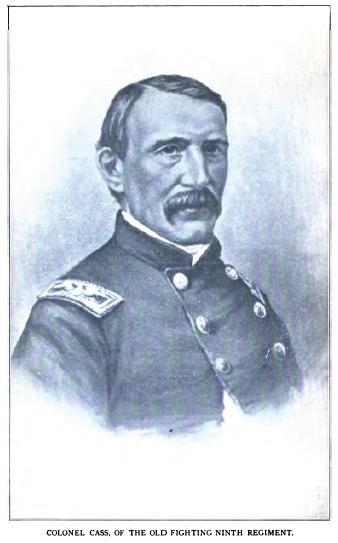
Colonel Thomas Cass

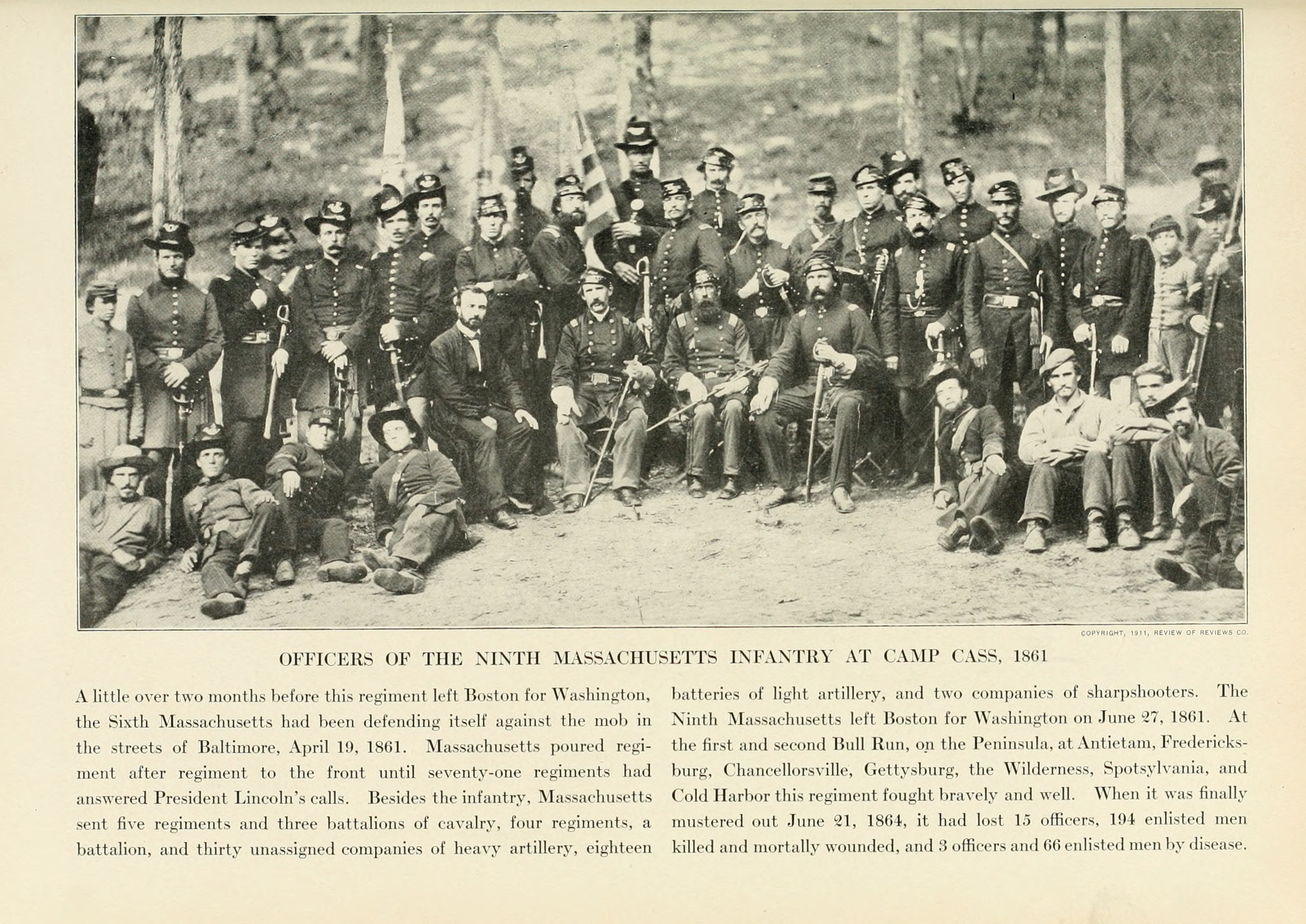
Officers and men of the 9th Mass Regiment at Camp Cass, 1861

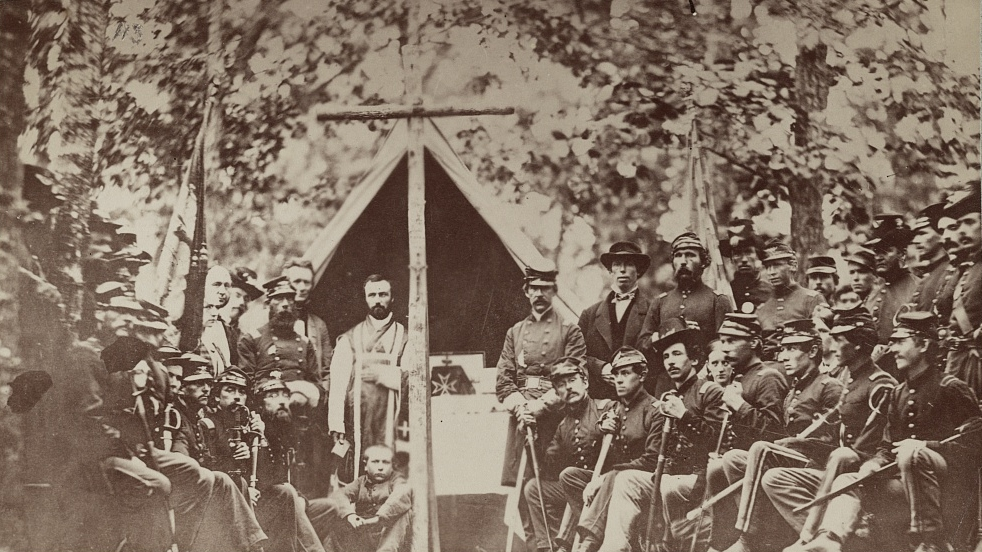
Men of the 9th MAss Regiment and their chaplain pause before celebrating mass at Camp Cass, Virginia, 1861

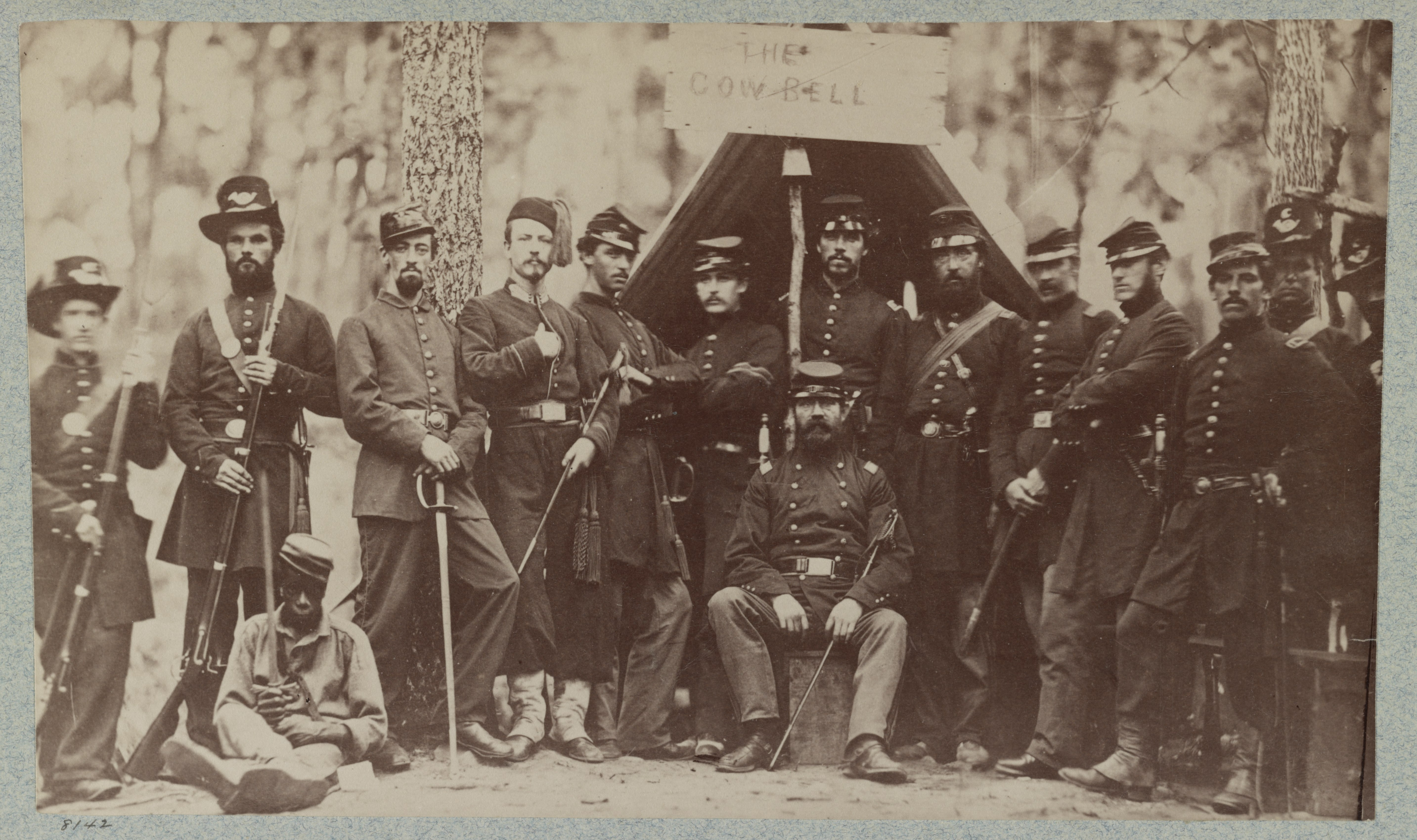
Ninth Massachusetts Infantry Camp near Washington, D.C., 1861

On 30 June 1861, the unit arrived in the Washington, D.C. vicinity and was welcomed by President Abraham Lincoln. They remained in the vicinity of Arlington Virginia performing picket duty and built a fort on the Potomac River called Fort Cass after their commanding officer. As a unit of the Army of the Potomac under the command of Major General George B. McClellan, the regiment moved south with the rest of the Army in pursuit of the Confederate forces.

The 9th Massachusetts were armed with .69 caliber smoothbore muskets and used them all through the campaigns of 1862–63. In the fall of 1863, shortly before the Mine Run Campaign, the regiment was reequipped with Springfield rifles.

On 26 June 1862 the regiment participated in the Battle of Mechanicsville, about six miles from Richmond Virginia which resulted in a Union Army victory and more than 2,000 Confederate casualties. The next day the regiment was assigned to hold the bridge over the mill creek in the action that later became known as the Battle of Gaines Mill. The regiment was told to hold the bridge pending the arrival of two supporting regiments. The support troops were delayed in their arrival new and the Ninth Regiment successfully repelled several Confederate assaults on the bridge. The supporting troops, including a regiment of New York Irishmen, the 63rd New York eventually arrived, but by this point the opposing forces had built their strength and the Ninth was unable to hold the bridge. Eventually the Confederate forces led by General James Longstreet and General Ambrose Powell Hill, broke the Union line forcing the Union Army into retreat. The Ninth Regiment brought up the rear of the retreat fighting a rearguard action against the opposing forces. The Union Army lost 6,000 killed or wounded in this battle and the Ninth's casualties totaled 252 men.

The Ninth participated in the Battle of Malvern Hill on 1 July 1862 as part of the Peninsular Campaign waged by the Union Army intending to capture the city of Richmond. The Ninth Regiment held the hill and prepared it to withstand a siege by the Confederate Army. Supported by five US Navy gunboats on the nearby James River, and benefiting from favorable geography and extensive defensive preparations, the Union Army withstood repeated charges inflicting heavy casualties on the Southern forces. It was in this battle that Colonel Cass received a mortal wound in his face and mouth that eventually took his life. When Colonel Cass fell in battle, command of the Ninth was assumed by Acting Lieutenant Colonel Hawley. Colonel Hawley was subsequently wounded in the same action, and command fell to Acting Major, Captain O’Leary. The unit's casualties were very heavy; along with losing their two top commanders, roughly half the regiment was put out of action, totaling 166 men. Colonel Cass died in Boston Massachusetts on 12 July 1862 and was buried with full military honors at Mt Auburn cemetery. Today, a statue of the Colonel stands in the Boston Public Garden.

Following the death of its commander, Colonel Patrick Robert Guiney took command of the regiment on 4 August 1862. At this point the Ninth took its place in the newly formed Army of Virginia under the command of General John Pope. The regiment participated in the Second Battle of Bull Run, which resulted in a decisive defeat for the Northern Army. News of the defeat at Bull Run so shook the inhabitants of Washington, D.C. that plans were made to abandon the city before the arrival of the Confederate Army. At his urging, General George Brinton McClellan was given command of the Army of the Potomac and led the army to Antietam Creek near Sharpsburg, Maryland on 17 September 1862 where they successfully engaged General Robert E. Lee's army.

The regiment subsequently played supporting roles in the Battle of Fredericksburg and the Battle of Chancellorsville. On 2–4 July 1863 the regiment was assigned to hold the strategically important position of Big Round Top during the Battle of Gettysburg. With the help of substantial stone breastworks, the regiment successfully withstood several assaults by the Confederate Army, taking casualties of 15 killed, wounded, or missing.

The regiment received orders on 30 April 1864 to meet the enemy under the command of General Ulysses S. Grant. The regiment participated in the Battle of the Wilderness in Virginia which resulted in the wounding of Colonel Guiney in the eye. Command of the regiment fell to Lieutenant Colonel Hanley. Along with Colonel Guiney, the regiment suffered casualties of 138 men.

The 9th Massachusetts declined to renew their enlistment term in the spring of 1864.

It suffered more severe losses at the Orange Turnpike, losing 78 men killed and wounded. The regiment continued to fight at North Anna River and Bethesda Church near Cold Harbor with light losses. On 10 June 1864, the Fighting 9th withdrew from the field and was transported to Boston Harbor, arriving on 15 June. The regiment was mustered out of the Army on 24 June 1864.

Following the battle, the regiment mustered out of service and returned to Boston on 15 June 1864. Soldiers who had elected to renew their enlistment terms were transferred to the 32nd Massachusetts. Following a welcoming parade and banquet at Faneuil Hall, the men of the regiment were mustered out in a ceremony on Boston Common on 21 June 1864 and the regiment was disbanded. According to Miller's Photographic History of the Civil War the regiment had killed/mortally wounded 15 officers and 194 enlisted men with an additional loss of 3 officers and 66 men by disease.

== See also ==
- List of Massachusetts Civil War units
- Massachusetts in the Civil War
