= 1892 Washington gubernatorial election =

- November 8, 1892
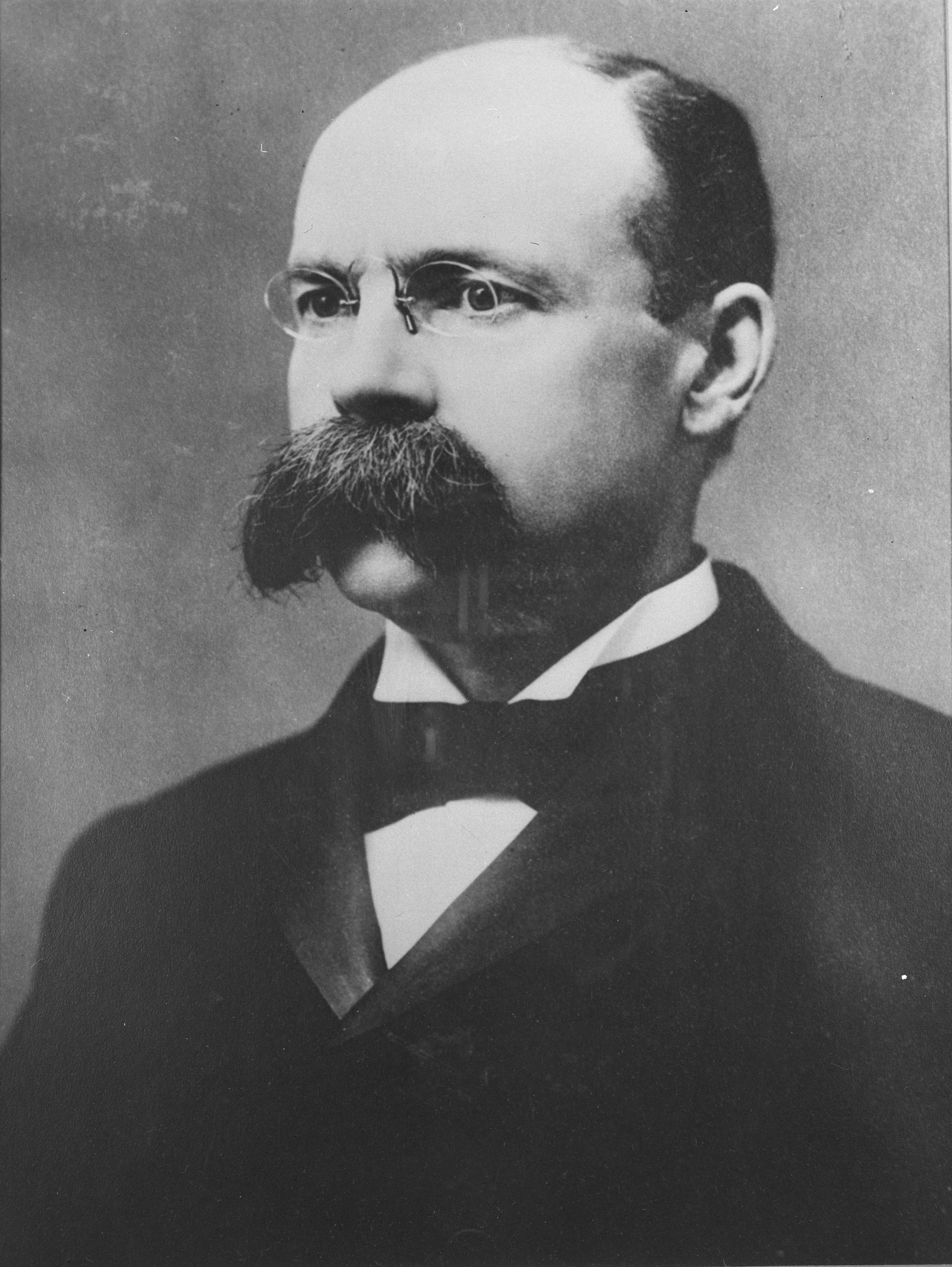

Nominee	John H. McGraw	Henry J. Snively	Cyrus W. Young
Party	Republican	Democratic	Populist
Popular vote	33,228	28,948	23,780
Percentage	36.96%	32.20%	26.45%
- County results McGraw: 30–40% 40–50% 50–60% Snively: 30–40% 40–50% Young: 30–40% Tie: 30–40%
Governor before election
Elisha P. Ferry
Republican
Elected Governor
John McGraw
Republican

The 1892 Washington gubernatorial election was held on November 8, 1892.

Republican nominee John McGraw defeated Democratic nominee Henry J. Snively and Populist nominee Cyrus W. Young, with 36.96% of the vote.

== General election ==
=== Candidates ===
Major party candidates

- John McGraw, Republican, King County Sheriff
- Henry J. Snively, Democratic

Other candidates

- Cyrus W. Young, Populist
- Roger Sherman Greene, Prohibition

=== Results ===
1892 Washington gubernatorial election (Note: Some sources give slightly different totals. The figures below are the ones as canvassed by the Washington state legislature and they also agree with the individual county returns held at the Washington State Archives)
Party	Candidate	Votes	%	±%
Republican	John H. McGraw	33,228	36.96%	−20.71%
Democratic	Henry J. Snively	28,948	32.20%	−10.11%
Populist	Cyrus W. Young	23,780	26.45%	
Prohibition	Roger S. Greene	3,941	4.38%	
Majority		4,280	4.76%	
Total votes		89,897	100.00%	
Republican hold		Swing	+10.60%	

=== Results by county ===
County	John H. McGraw Republican		Henry J. Snively Democratic		Cyrus W. Young Populist		Roger S. Greene Prohibition		Margin		Total votes cast
County	#	%	#	%	#	%	#	%	#	%	Total votes cast
Adams	226	39.58%	132	23.12%	207	36.25%	6	1.05%	19 (Note: McGraw's margin over Young)	3.33%	571
Asotin	183	49.19%	143	38.44%	25	6.72%	21	5.65%	40	10.75%	372
Chehalis	793	33.12%	796	33.25%	663	27.69%	142	5.93%	-3	-0.13%	2,394
Clallam	526	39.28%	391	29.20%	408	30.47%	14	1.05%	118	8.81%	1,339
Clark	890	33.88%	1,091	41.53%	484	18.42%	162	6.17%	-201	-7.65%	2,627
Columbia	571	37.10%	647	42.04%	209	13.58%	112	7.28%	-76	-4.94%	1,539
Cowlitz	646	36.75%	500	28.44%	547	31.11%	65	3.70%	99	5.63%	1,758
Douglas	353	34.51%	263	25.71%	383	37.44%	24	2.35%	-30 (Note: Young's margin over McGraw)	-2.93%	1,023
Franklin	27	21.77%	52	41.94%	43	34.68%	2	1.61%	-9 (Note: Snively's margin over Young)	-7.26%	124
Garfield	322	35.42%	300	33.00%	237	26.07%	50	5.50%	22	2.42%	909
Island	130	32.18%	106	26.24%	130	32.18%	38	9.41%	0	0.00%	404
Jefferson	568	40.78%	624	44.80%	180	12.92%	21	1.51%	-56	-4.02%	1,393
King	7,773	51.84%	3,222	21.49%	3,496	23.32%	503	3.35%	4,277	28.52%	14,994
Kitsap	501	34.67%	291	20.14%	567	39.24%	86	5.95%	-66	-4.57%	1,445
Kittitas	774	33.35%	784	33.78%	724	31.19%	39	1.68%	-10	-0.43%	2,321
Klickitat	557	42.71%	264	20.25%	411	31.52%	72	5.52%	146	11.20%	1,304
Lewis	1,168	35.80%	1,041	31.90%	823	25.22%	231	7.08%	127	3.89%	3,263
Lincoln	858	34.38%	860	34.46%	697	27.92%	81	3.25%	-2	-0.08%	2,496
Mason	352	38.43%	349	38.10%	193	21.07%	22	2.40%	3	0.33%	916
Okanogan	594	49.71%	440	36.82%	155	12.97%	6	0.50%	154	12.89%	1,195
Pacific	721	49.66%	560	38.57%	111	7.64%	60	4.13%	161	11.09%	1,452
Pierce	1,790	16.10%	5,034	45.29%	3,770	33.92%	522	4.70%	-1,264	-11.37%	11,116
San Juan	341	52.46%	191	29.38%	84	12.92%	34	5.23%	150	23.08%	650
Skagit	1,103	37.59%	793	27.03%	899	30.64%	139	4.74%	204	6.95%	2,934
Skamania	81	36.99%	97	44.29%	38	17.35%	3	1.37%	-16	-7.31%	219
Snohomish	1,388	30.70%	1,311	29.00%	1,704	37.69%	118	2.61%	-316	-6.99%	4,521
Spokane	3,214	42.55%	2,267	30.01%	1,808	23.93%	265	3.51%	947	12.54%	7,554
Stevens	633	37.66%	480	28.55%	552	32.84%	16	0.95%	81	4.82%	1,681
Thurston	784	31.14%	797	31.65%	671	26.65%	266	10.56%	-13	-0.52%	2,518
Wahkiakum	252	44.68%	230	40.78%	74	13.12%	8	1.42%	22	3.90%	564
Walla Walla	1,211	41.80%	1,322	45.63%	88	3.04%	276	9.53%	-111	-3.83%	2,897
Whatcom	1,331	32.38%	1,123	27.32%	1,431	34.81%	226	5.50%	-100	-2.43%	4,111
Whitman	2,063	35.83%	1,843	32.01%	1,563	27.15%	288	5.00%	220	3.82%	5,757
Yakima	504	32.81%	604	39.32%	405	26.37%	23	1.50%	-100	-6.51%	1,536
Totals	33,228	36.96%	28,948	32.20%	23,780	26.45%	3,941	4.38%	4,280	4.76%	89,897

==== Counties that flipped from Democratic to Republican ====
- Clallam

==== Counties that flipped from Republican to Democratic ====
- Chehalis
- Clark
- Columbia
- Jefferson
- Kittitas
- Lincoln
- Pierce
- Thurston
- Walla Walla
- Yakima

==== Counties that flipped from Republican to Populist ====
- Douglas
- Kitsap
- Snohomish
- Whatcom
