= John Hanson =

American Founding Father and merchant (1721–1783)

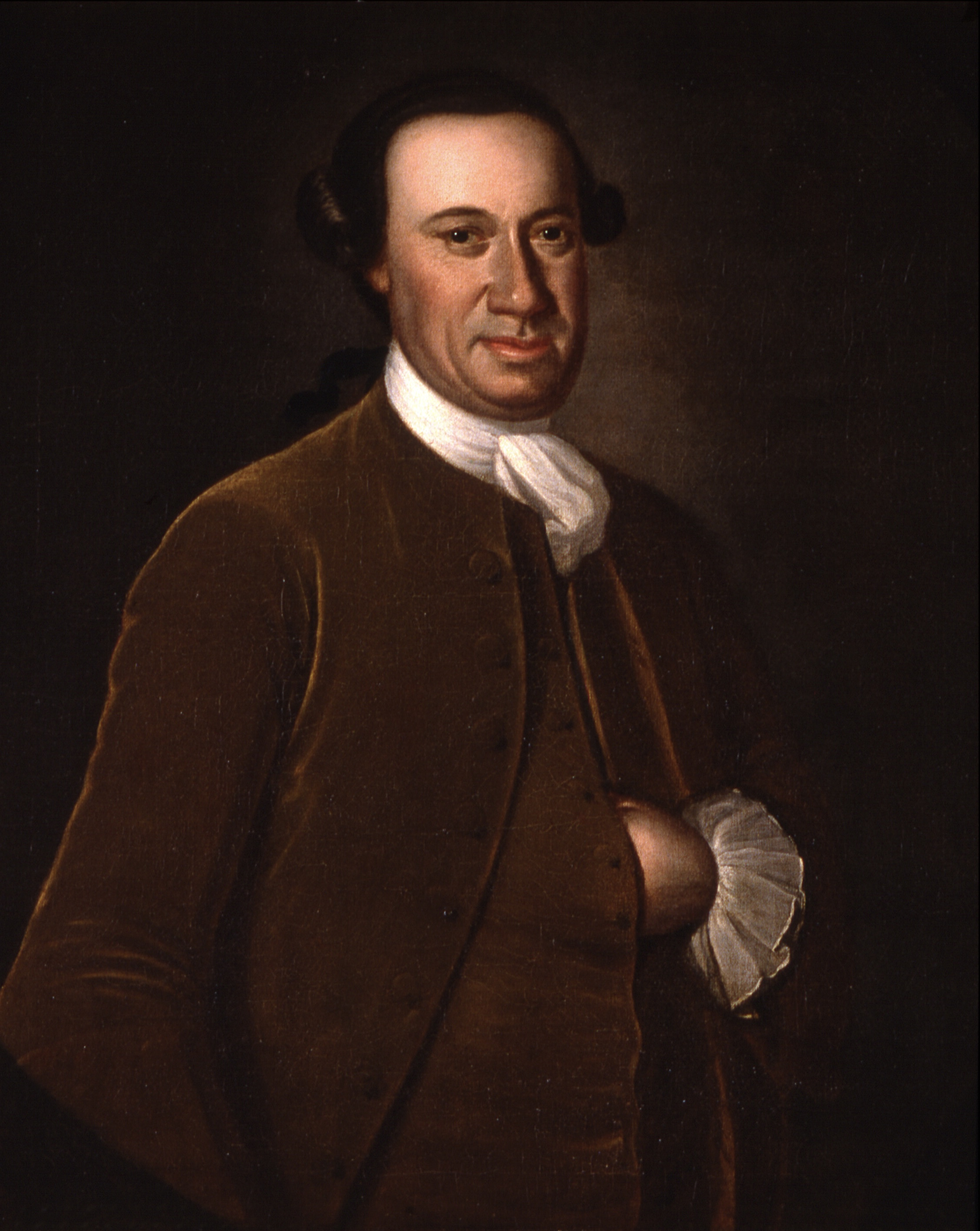
- Portrait attributed to John Hesselius, c. 1765–1770

3rd President of the Confederation Congress
- In office November 5, 1781 – November 3, 1782
- Preceded by: Thomas McKean
- Succeeded by: Elias Boudinot

Personal details
- Born: April 14, 1721 near Port Tobacco, Maryland, British America
- Died: November 15, 1783 (aged 62) Oxon Hill, Maryland, U.S.
- Spouse: Jane Contee (m. ~1744)
- Children: 8, including Alexander
- Parent(s): Samuel Hanson; Elizabeth Storey
- Occupation: Merchant, politician

John Hanson (14 April [O.S. 3 April] 1721 – November 15, 1783) was an American Founding Father, merchant, and politician from Maryland during the Revolutionary Era. In 1779, Hanson was elected as a delegate to the Continental Congress after serving in a variety of roles for the Patriot cause in Maryland. He signed the Articles of Confederation in 1781 after Maryland joined the other states in ratifying them. In November 1781, following ratification of the articles, he was elected President of the Confederation Congress—a mostly ceremonial and clerical position, sometimes styled President of the United States in Congress assembled—by his fellow delegates.

He was not the first person to hold the office. Samuel Huntington and Thomas McKean had each preceded him under the Articles of Confederation, as had five other men as President of the Continental Congress before ratification. Some Hanson descendants and biographers have falsely claimed that he was actually the first holder of the office of President of the United States, an unrelated executive position created in 1789 by the Constitution of the United States.

== Early life ==
Hanson was born in Port Tobacco Parish in Charles County in the Province of Maryland on April 14, 1721. Sources published prior to a 1940 genealogical study sometimes listed his birth date as April 13 or his year of birth as 1715. Hanson was born on a plantation called "Mulberry Grove" into a wealthy and prominent family. The Hanson Family was of English descent. His parents were Samuel (c. 1685–1740) and Elizabeth (Storey) Hanson (c. 1688–1764). Samuel Hanson was a planter who owned more than 1,000 acres (4.0 km^{2}), and held a variety of political offices, including serving two terms in the Maryland General Assembly.

Hanson's grandfather, also named John, came to Charles County, Maryland, as an indentured servant around 1661. In 1876, a writer named George Hanson placed Hanson in his family tree of Swedish-Americans descended from four Swedish brothers who emigrated to New Sweden in 1642. This story was often repeated over the next century, but scholarly research in the late 20th century showed that Hanson was not related to those Swedish-American Hansons.

Little is known about Hanson's early life; he was presumably privately tutored as was customary among the wealthy of his time and place. He followed his father's path as a planter, slave owner, and public official. He was often referred to as John Hanson, Jr., to distinguish him from an older man of the same name.

== Political career ==
Hanson's career in public service began in 1750, when he was appointed sheriff of Charles County. In 1757, he was elected to represent Charles County in the lower house of the Maryland General Assembly, where he served for twelve years, sitting on many important committees. Maryland was a proprietary colony, and Hanson aligned himself with the "popular" or "country" party, which opposed any expansion of the power of the proprietary governors at the expense of the popularly elected lower house. He was a leading opponent of the 1765 Stamp Act, chairing the committee that drafted the instructions for Maryland's delegates to the Stamp Act Congress. In protest of the Townshend Acts, in 1769 Hanson was one of the signers of a non-importation resolution that boycotted British imports until the acts were repealed.

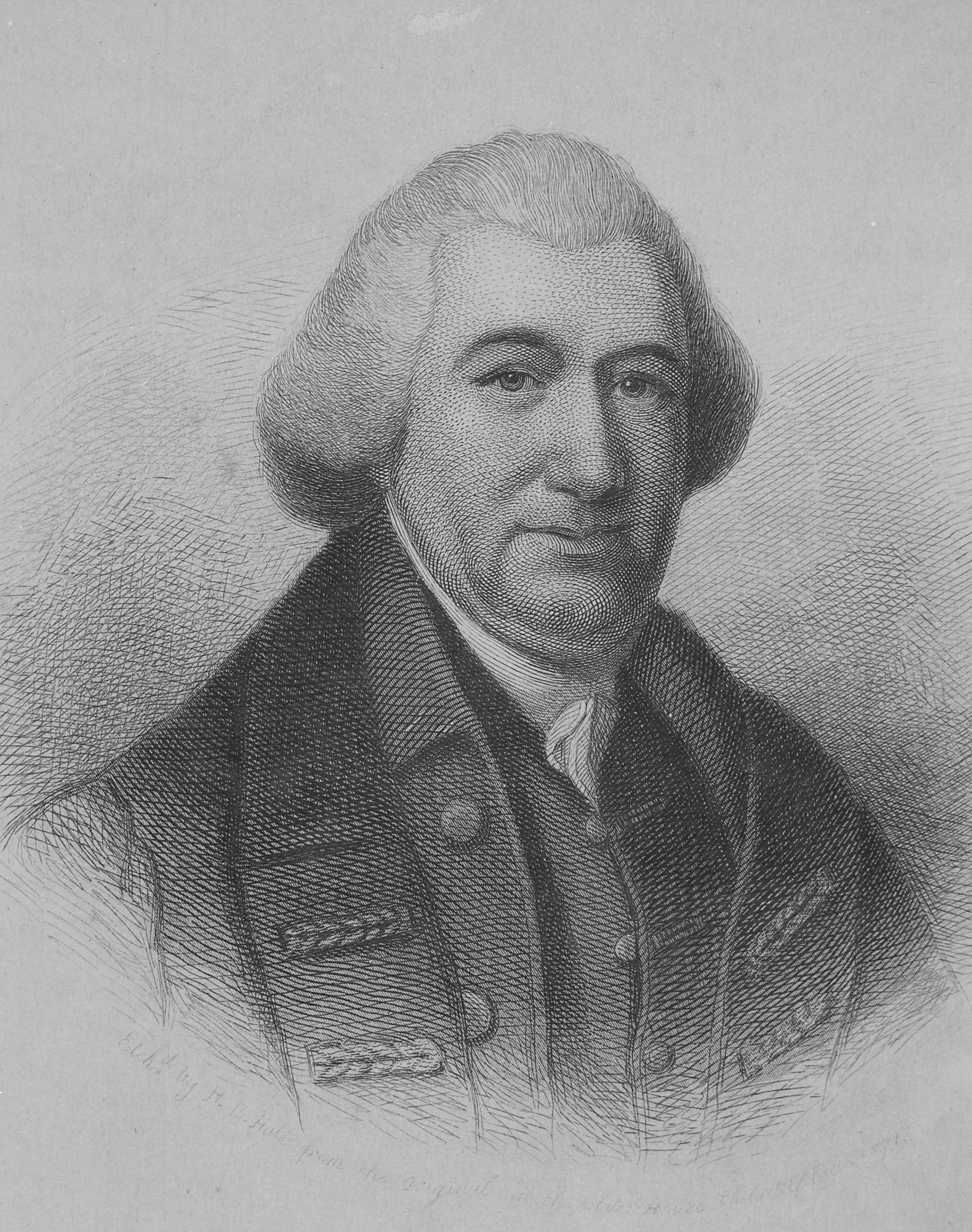
Etching of Hanson based on a portrait by Charles Willson Peale that was painted from life in 1781–1782

Hanson changed course in 1769, apparently to better pursue his business interests. He resigned from the General Assembly, sold his land in Charles County, and moved to Frederick County in western Maryland. There he held a variety of offices, including deputy surveyor, sheriff, and county treasurer. When relations between Great Britain and the colonies became a crisis in 1774, Hanson became one of Frederick County's leading Patriots. He chaired a town meeting that passed a resolution opposing the Boston Port Act. In 1775, he was a delegate to the Maryland Convention, an extralegal body convened after the colonial assembly had been prorogued. With the other delegates, he signed the Association of Freemen on July 26, 1775, which expressed hope for reconciliation with Great Britain but also called for military resistance to the enforcement of the Coercive Acts.

With hostilities underway, Hanson chaired the Frederick County Committee of Observation, part of the Patriot organization that assumed control of local governance. Responsible for recruiting and arming soldiers, Hanson proved to be an excellent organizer, and Frederick County sent the first southern troops to join George Washington's army. Because funds were scarce, Hanson frequently paid soldiers and others with his own money. In June 1776, Hanson chaired the Frederick County meeting that urged provincial leaders in Annapolis to instruct Maryland's delegates in the Continental Congress to declare independence from Great Britain. While Congress worked on the Declaration of Independence, Hanson was in Frederick County "making gunlocks, storing powder, guarding prisoners, raising money and troops, dealing with Tories, and doing the myriad other tasks which went with being chairman of the committee of observation".

Hanson was elected to the newly reformed Maryland House of Delegates in 1777, the first of five annual terms. In December 1779, the House of Delegates named Hanson as a delegate to the Second Continental Congress; he began serving in Congress in Philadelphia in June 1780. "Hanson came to Philadelphia with the reputation of having been the leading financier of the revolution in western Maryland, and soon he was a member of several committees dealing with finance."

When Hanson was elected to Congress, Maryland was holding up the ratification of the Articles of Confederation. The state, which did not have any claims on western land, refused to ratify the Articles until the other states had ceded their western land claims. When the other states finally did so, the Maryland legislature decided in January 1781 to ratify the Articles. When Congress received notice of this, Hanson joined Daniel Carroll in signing the Articles of Confederation on behalf of Maryland on March 1, 1781. With Maryland's endorsement, the Articles officially went into effect. Many years later, some Hanson biographers claimed that Hanson had been instrumental in arranging the compromise and thus securing ratification of the Articles, but according to historian Ralph Levering, there is no documentary evidence of Hanson's opinions or actions in resolving the controversy.

In 1782, Hanson proclaimed on behalf of the Continental Congress for a day of "Solemn Thanksgiving".

=== President of Congress ===
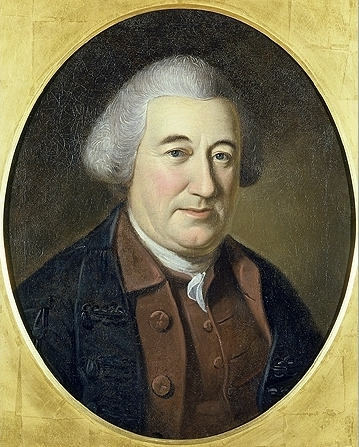
John Hanson, portrait from life painted by Charles Willson Peale in 1781–1782

On November 5, 1781, Congress elected Hanson as its president. Under the Articles of Confederation, both legislative and executive government were vested in the Congress (as it was and still is in Britain); the presidency of Congress was a mostly ceremonial position, but the office did require Hanson to serve as neutral discussion moderator, handle official correspondence, and sign documents. Hanson found the work tedious and considered resigning after just one week, citing his poor health and family responsibilities. Colleagues urged him to remain because Congress at that moment lacked a quorum to choose a successor. Out of a sense of duty, Hanson remained in office, although his term as a delegate to Congress was nearly expired. The Maryland Assembly re-elected him as a delegate on November 28, 1781, and so Hanson continued to serve as president until November 4, 1782.

The Articles of Confederation stipulated that presidents of Congress serve one-year terms, and Hanson became the first to do so. Contrary to the claims of some of his later advocates, however, he was not the first president to serve under the Articles nor the first to be elected under the Articles. When the Articles went into effect in March 1781, Congress did not bother to elect a new president; instead, Samuel Huntington continued serving a term that had already exceeded a year. On July 9, 1781, Samuel Johnston became the first man to be elected as president of Congress after the ratification of the Articles. He declined the office, however, perhaps to make himself available for North Carolina's gubernatorial election. After Johnston turned down the office, Thomas McKean was elected. McKean served just a few months, resigning in October 1781 after hearing news of the British surrender at Yorktown. Congress asked him to remain in office until November, when a new session of Congress was scheduled to begin. It was in that session that Hanson began to serve his one-year term. A highlight of Hanson's term was when George Washington presented Cornwallis's sword to Congress. Hanson retired from public office after his one-year term as president of Congress.

== Personal life and death ==
About 1744, he married Jane Contee (1728–1812), daughter of Alexander Contee (1692–1740). They had eight children, including: Jane Contee Hanson (1747–1781), who married Philip Thomas (1747–1815), Peter Contee Hanson (1748–1776), who died in the battle of Fort Washington during the American Revolutionary War, and Alexander Contee Hanson Sr. (1749–1806), who was a notable essayist. Alexander Hanson is sometimes confused with his son, Alexander Contee Hanson, Jr. (1786–1819), who became a newspaper editor and U.S. Senator.

In poor health, he died on November 15, 1783, while visiting Oxon Hill Manor in Prince George's County, Maryland, the plantation of his nephew Thomas Hawkins Hanson. He was buried there. Hanson owned at least 223 acres of land and 11 slaves at the time of his death.

== Legacy ==
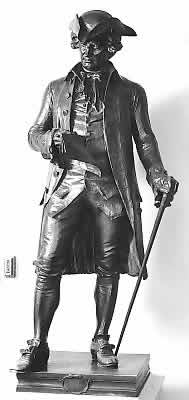
The bronze statue of Hanson in the National Statuary Hall Collection

In 1898, Douglas H. Thomas, a descendant of Hanson, wrote a biography promoting Hanson as the first true President of the United States. Thomas became the "driving force" behind the selection of Hanson as one of the two people who would represent Maryland in the National Statuary Hall Collection in Washington, D.C. Hanson was not initially on the shortlist for consideration, but he was chosen after lobbying by the Maryland Historical Society. In 1903, bronze statues of Hanson and Charles Carroll by sculptor Richard E. Brooks were added to Statuary Hall; Hanson's is currently located on the 2nd floor of the Senate connecting corridor. Small versions of these two statues (maquettes) sit on the president's desk in the Senate Chamber of the Maryland State House.

Some historians have questioned the appropriateness of Hanson's selection for the honor of representing Maryland in Statuary Hall. According to historian Gregory Stiverson, Hanson was not one of Maryland's foremost leaders of the Revolutionary era. In 1975, historian Ralph Levering said that "Hanson shouldn't have been one of the two Marylanders" chosen, but he wrote that Hanson "probably contributed as much as any other Marylander to the success of the American Revolution". In the 21st century, Maryland lawmakers have considered replacing Hanson's statue in Statuary Hall with one of Harriet Tubman.

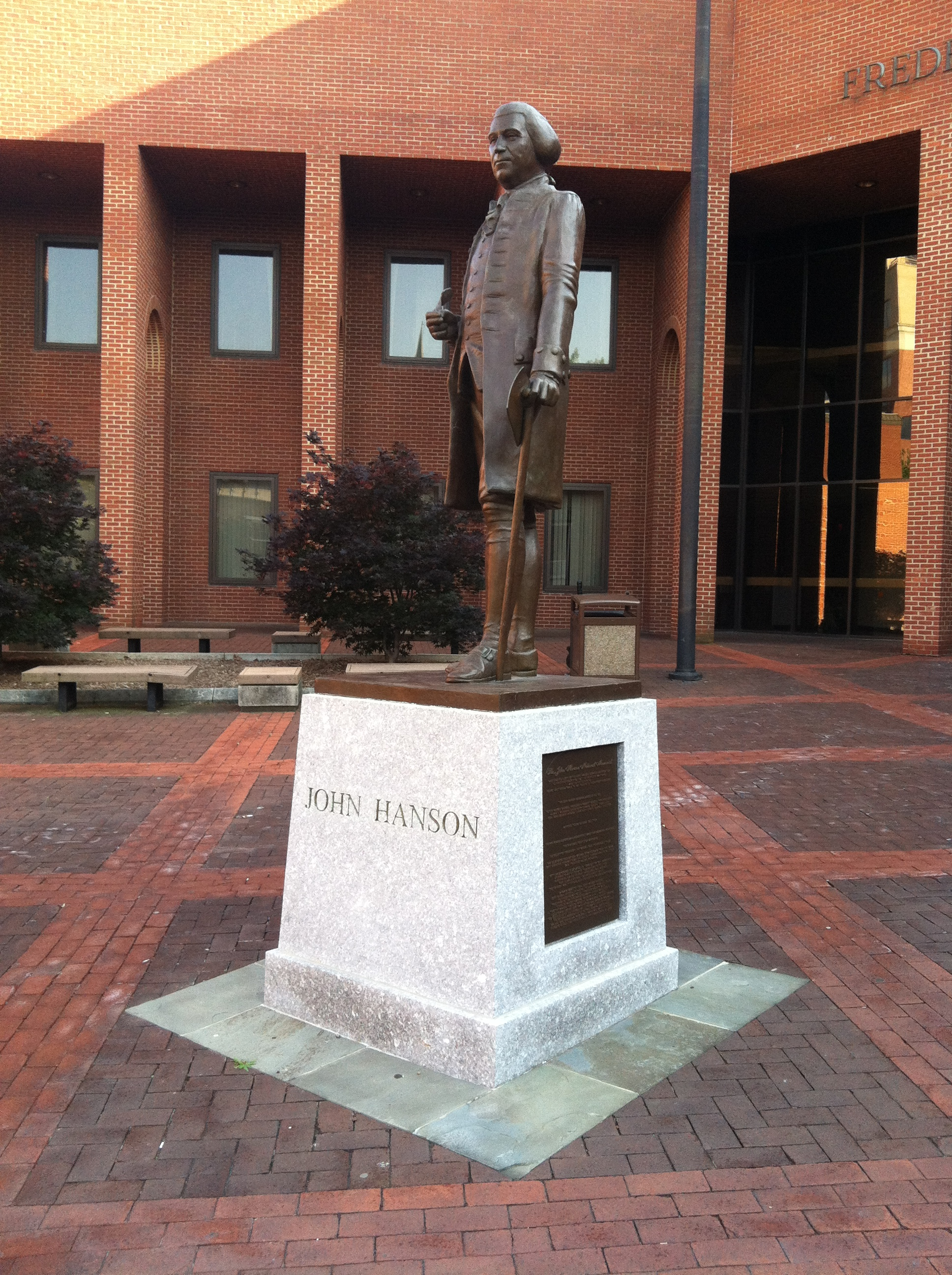
John Hanson National Memorial, located in front of the Frederick County Courthouse in Frederick, Maryland

The idea that Hanson was the forgotten first president of the United States was further promoted in a 1932 biography of Hanson by journalist Seymour Wemyss Smith. Smith's book asserts that the American Revolution had two primary leaders: George Washington on the battlefield and John Hanson in politics. Smith's book, like Douglas H. Thomas's 1898 book, was one of a number of biographies written seeking to promote Hanson as the "first President of the United States". Regarding the opinion, historian Ralph Levering stated: "They're not biographies by professional historians; they aren't based on research into primary sources." According to historian Richard B. Morris, if a president of Congress were to be called the first president of the United States, "a stronger case could be made for Peyton Randolph of Virginia, the first president of the first and second Continental Congresses, or for John Hancock, the president of Congress when that body declared its independence." The claim that Hanson was a forgotten president of the United States was revived on the Internet, sometimes with a new assertion that he was actually a black man; an anachronistic photograph of Senator John Hanson of Liberia has been used to support this claim.

In 1972, Hanson was depicted on a 6-cent U.S. postal card, which featured his name and portrait next to the word "Patriot". Historian Irving Brant criticized the selection of Hanson for the card, arguing that it was a result of the "old hoax" promoting Hanson as the first president of the United States. In 1981, Hanson was featured on a 20-cent U.S. postage stamp. U.S. Route 50 between Washington, D.C., and Annapolis is named the John Hanson Highway in his honor. There are also middle schools located in Oxon Hill, Maryland, and Waldorf, Maryland, named after him. A former savings bank named for him was merged in the 1990s with Industrial Bank of Washington, D.C. The Hanson-Thomas Houses were listed on the National Register of Historic Places in 1972, and delisted in 1982, after being partially demolished for reconstruction.

In the 1970s, a descendant of Hanson, John Hanson Briscoe, served as Speaker of the Maryland House of Delegates, which passed "a measure establishing April 14 as John Hanson Day." In 2009, the John Hanson Memorial Association was incorporated in Frederick, Maryland, to create the John Hanson National Memorial and to educate Americans about Hanson as well as to educate people about the many myths written about him.

Books, journals, and encyclopedias

- Burnett, Edward Cody (1941). The Continental Congress. New York: Norton.
- Chaney, Kevin R. (2000). "Hanson, Alexander Contee". American National Biography Online. Oxford University Press.(subscription required)
- Fanelli, Doris Devine; Diethorn, Karie (2001). History of the Portrait Collection, Independence National Historical Park. Philadelphia: American Philosophical Society.
- Hanson, George A. (1876). Old Kent: The Eastern Shore of Maryland. Baltimore: Forges.
- Lee, Jean B. (1994). The Price of Nationhood: The American Revolution in Charles County. New York City: W. W. Norton & Company. ISBN 978-0393036589.
- Levering, Ralph B. (1976). "John Hanson, Public Servant". Maryland Historical Magazine. 71 (Summer): 113–33.
- Mereness, Newton D. (1932). "Hanson, John" (PDF). Dictionary of American Biography. Vol. VIII. New York: Scribner. pp. 231–32.
- Morris, Richard B. (1987). "The Origins of the Presidency". Presidential Studies Quarterly. 17 (4 [Fall]): 673–87.
- Newman, Harry Wright (1970) [First published 1940]. Charles County Gentry: A Genealogical History of Six Emigrants... Baltimore: Genealogical Publishing.
- Papenfuse, Edward C.; Day, Alan F.; Jordan, David W.; Stiverson, Gregory A. (1979). "Hanson, John, Jr." (PDF). A Biographical Dictionary of the Maryland Legislature, 1635–1789. Vol. 1. Johns Hopkins University Press. pp. 405–06. ISBN 0-8018-1995-4.
- Sanders, Jennings B. (1930). The Presidency of the Continental Congress, 1774–89. pp. 20–21, 24 – via Hathitrust.
- Stiverson, Gregory A. (2000). "Hanson, John, Jr". American National Biography Online. Oxford University Press.(subscription required)
- Wilson, Rick K. (1994). Congressional Dynamics: Structure, Coordination, and Choice in the First American Congress, 1774–1789. Stanford University Press.
- Winquist, Alan H.; Rousselow-Winquist, Jessica (2006). Touring Swedish America. Minnesota Historical Society.

Newspapers and online sources

- Brant, Irving (December 9, 1972). "President Whatsizname". The New York Times.(subscription required)
- Bykowicz, Julie (February 22, 2011). "A historical battle over Maryland statues". The Baltimore Sun.
- Du Lac, J. Freedom (March 16, 2011). "Harriet Tubman vs. John Hanson: Statuary Hall smackdown". The Washington Post.
- Lidman, David (July 30, 1972). "John Hanson, Patriot and President". The New York Times.(subscription required)
- Peterson, Audrey (March 6, 2009). "Black History Urban Legends". American Legacy. Archived from the original on March 31, 2009.
- "Arago: John Hanson Issue". National Postal Museum, Smithsonian Institution.
- "John Hanson". The National Statuary Hall Collection. Architect of the Capitol.
- "The New Senate Chamber". The Maryland State House. Maryland State Archives. 2007.

Political offices
Preceded by Thomas McKean	President of the Continental Congress; November 5, 1781 – November 3, 1782	Succeeded by Elias Boudinot
