= Patrick Robert Guiney =

U.S. Army officer (1835–1877)

Patrick Robert Guiney (15 January 1835 in Parkstown, County Tipperary, Ireland – March 21, 1877 in Boston) was an American Civil War soldier.

== Early life and career ==
Patrick Robert Guiney was the second and eldest surviving son of James Roger Guiney, who was descended from Jacobites, and Judith Macrae. James Guiney, impoverished after a failed runaway marriage, brought with him on his second voyage to New Brunswick his favourite child Patrick, then not six years old. After some years, Mrs. Guiney and their younger son, William, rejoined her husband, recently crippled by a fall from his horse; they settled in Portland, Maine. The young Guiney worked as a wheel boy in a rope factory, and at the age of fourteen apprenticed to a machinist in Lawrence, Massachusetts, but stayed only a year and a half before returning to Portland.

He hoped to better himself through education, and attended the public grammar school. He matriculated at the College of the Holy Cross in Worcester, Massachusetts. His depleting finances caused him to leave after about a year, despite the fact that the college president offered to make some arrangement for him to stay, which, according to Guiney's daughter, his honor would not allow him to accept. Guiney's book-loving father having meanwhile died, he went to study for the Bar under Judge Walton, and was admitted in Lewiston, Maine, in 1856, taking up the practice of criminal law.

In politics he was a Republican. For the Massachusetts Society for the Prevention of Cruelty to Animals, he won its first suit. In 1859 he married in the old cathedral, Boston, Janet Margaret Doyle, related to James Warren Doyle, bishop of Kildare and Leighlin. They had one son, who died in infancy, and one daughter, the poet and essayist Louise Imogen Guiney. Home life in Roxbury and professional success were cut short by the outbreak of the Civil War.

== Civil War ==
Familiar with the manual of arms, Guiney enlisted for example's sake as a private, refusing a commission from Governor John A. Andrew until he had worked hard to help recruit the 9th Massachusetts Infantry Regiment. By June 1861, Guiney was a captain. Within two years (July, 1862), the first colonel having died from a wound received in action, Lieutenant-Colonel Guiney succeeded Young to the command. He won high official praise, notably for courage and presence of mind at the Battle of the Chickahominy, or Gaines's Mill, Virginia. Here, after three successive color-bearers had been shot down, the colonel himself reportedly seized the flag, threw aside coat and sword-belt, rose white-shirted and conspicuous in the stirrups, inspired a final rally, and turned the fortune of the day.

Guiney fought in over thirty engagements, including the Battle of Antietam, the Battle of Fredericksburg, and the Battle of Chancellorsville.

The 9th Massachusetts was present at Gettysburg in second brigade first division V Corps on July 1, 1863. Col Jacob B. Sweitzer the brigade commander, detached Guiney's regiment for picket duty. Consequently, the regiment missed the second day's fighting at the Battle of Gettysburg.

In 1864, through the battle of the Wilderness, Guiney frequently had been in command of his brigade, the second brigade, first division, Fifth Corps. After many escapes from dangerous combats without serious injury, he was shot in the face by a sharpshooter at the Battle of the Wilderness on May 5, 1864. The Minié ball destroyed his left eye, and inflicted, it was believed, a fatal wound. During an interval of consciousness, however, Guiney insisted on an operation which saved his life. Guiney was honorably discharged and mustered out of the U.S. Volunteers on June 21, 1864, just before the mustering out of his old regiment.

On February 21, 1866, President Andrew Johnson nominated Guiney for the award of the honorary grade of brevet brigadier general, to rank from March 13, 1865, for gallant and meritorious services during the war. The U.S. Senate confirmed the award on April 10, 1866.

== Postbellum ==
Kept alive for years by nursing, he ran unsuccessfully for Congress on a sort of "Christian Socialist" platform, was elected assistant district attorney (1866–70), and acted as consulting lawyer (not being longer able to plead) on many locally celebrated cases.

His last exertions were devoted to the defeat of the corruption and misuse of the Probate Court of Suffolk County, Massachusetts, of which he had become registrar (1869–77). Guiney died of heart disease at his residence after collapsing on a street near his home. General Guiney was Commandant of the Loyal Legion, Major-General Commandant of the Veteran Military League, member of the Irish Charitable Society, and one of the founders and first members of the Catholic Union of Boston. He also published some literary criticism, a few graphic prose sketches and some verse.

== See also ==
- List of Massachusetts generals in the American Civil War
- Massachusetts in the American Civil War

== Sources ==
- Commanding Boston's Irish Ninth: the Civil War letters of Colonel Patrick R. Guiney, Ninth Massachusetts Volunteer Infantry, ed. Christian G. Samito, New York: Fordham University Press, 1998.
- Eicher, John H. and Eicher, David J. Civil War High Commands. Stanford, CA: Stanford University Press, 2001. ISBN 0-8047-3641-3.
- Hunt, Roger D. and Brown, Jack R. Brevet Brigadier Generals in Blue. Gaithersburg, MD: Olde Soldier Books, Inc., 1990. ISBN 1-56013-002-4.
