= Statue of John McGraw =

Statue in Seattle, Washington, U.S.

John Harte McGraw
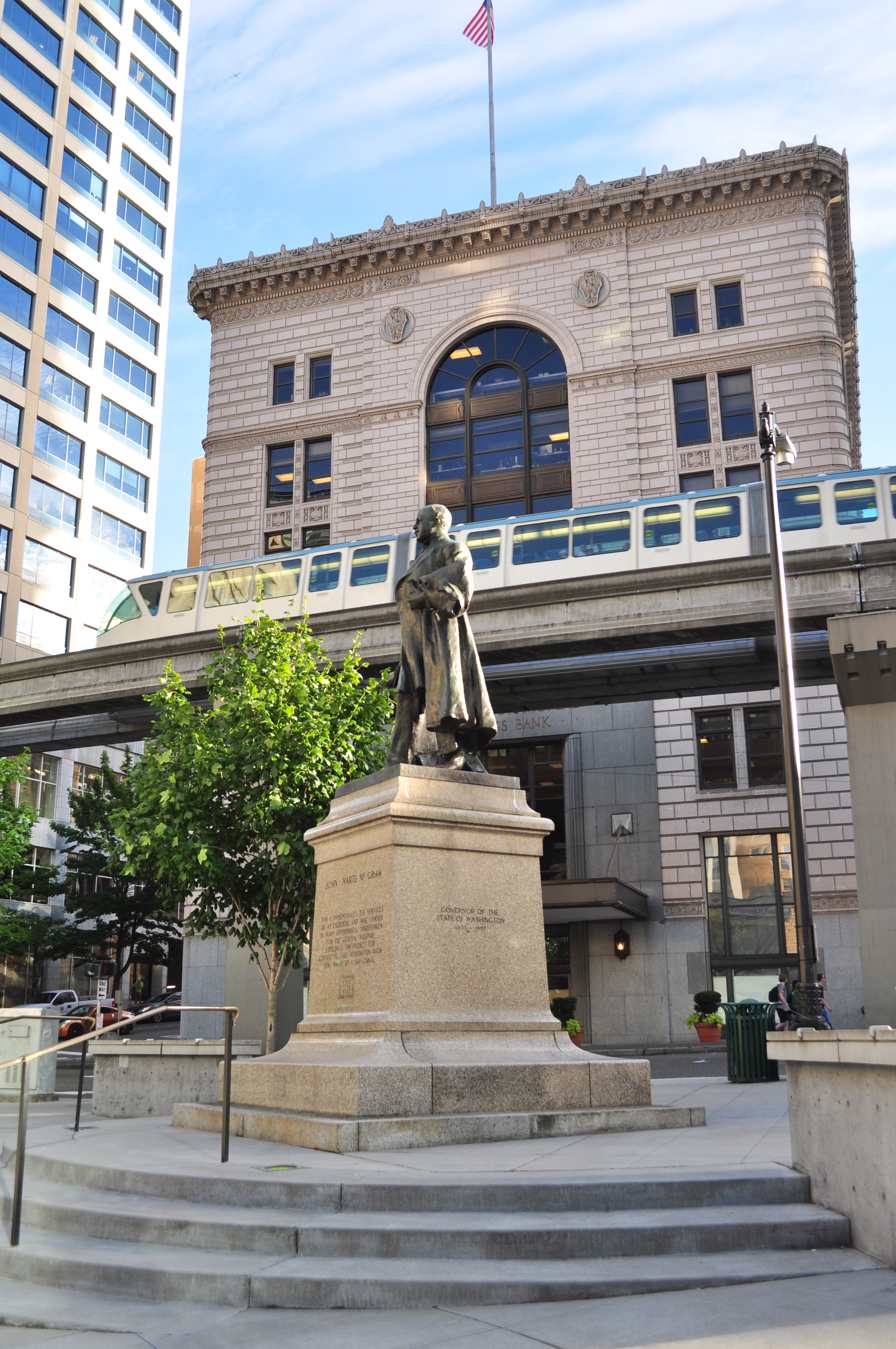
- Artist: Richard E. Brooks
- Year: 1912
- Type: Sculpture
- Medium: Sculpture: bronze Base: granite
- Subject: John McGraw
- Dimensions: 1.8 m × 1.2 m × 1.2 m (6 ft × 4 ft × 4 ft)
- Condition: "Well maintained" (1995)
- Location: Seattle, Washington, United States; 47.612979°N 122.337594°W

John Harte McGraw is an outdoor 1912 bronze sculpture depicting the former governor of the same name by Richard E. Brooks, installed in McGraw Square at the intersection of Fifth Avenue and Olive Street in Seattle, in the U.S. state of Washington.

== Description ==
The statue measures approximately 6 feet (1.8 m) x 4 feet (1.2 m) x 4 feet (1.2 m) and rests on a granite base that measures approximately 7 feet (2.1 m) x 6.5 feet (2.0 m) x 6.5 feet (2.0 m).

== History ==
The work was surveyed and deemed "well maintained" by the Smithsonian Institution's "Save Outdoor Sculpture!" program in June 1995.

== See also ==
- 1912 in art
