= John Hansen (footballer, born 1974) =

Faroese footballer

Personal information
- Date of birth: 16 March 1974 (age 52)
- Place of birth: Faroe Islands
- Position: Midfielder

Senior career*
Years	Team	Apps	(Gls)
1991–2003	KÍ Klaksvík	118	(17)

International career
1998	Faroe Islands	3	(0)
- * Club domestic league appearances and goals

John Ryan (born 16 March 1974) until 1999 named John Ryan Hansen is a Faroese former international footballer who played as a midfielder. Hansen spent his entire club career with KÍ Klaksvík. He played three matches for the Faroe Islands national football team from 1992 to 1999.
