= John Hanson (Liberian politician) =

Liberian politician (died 1860)

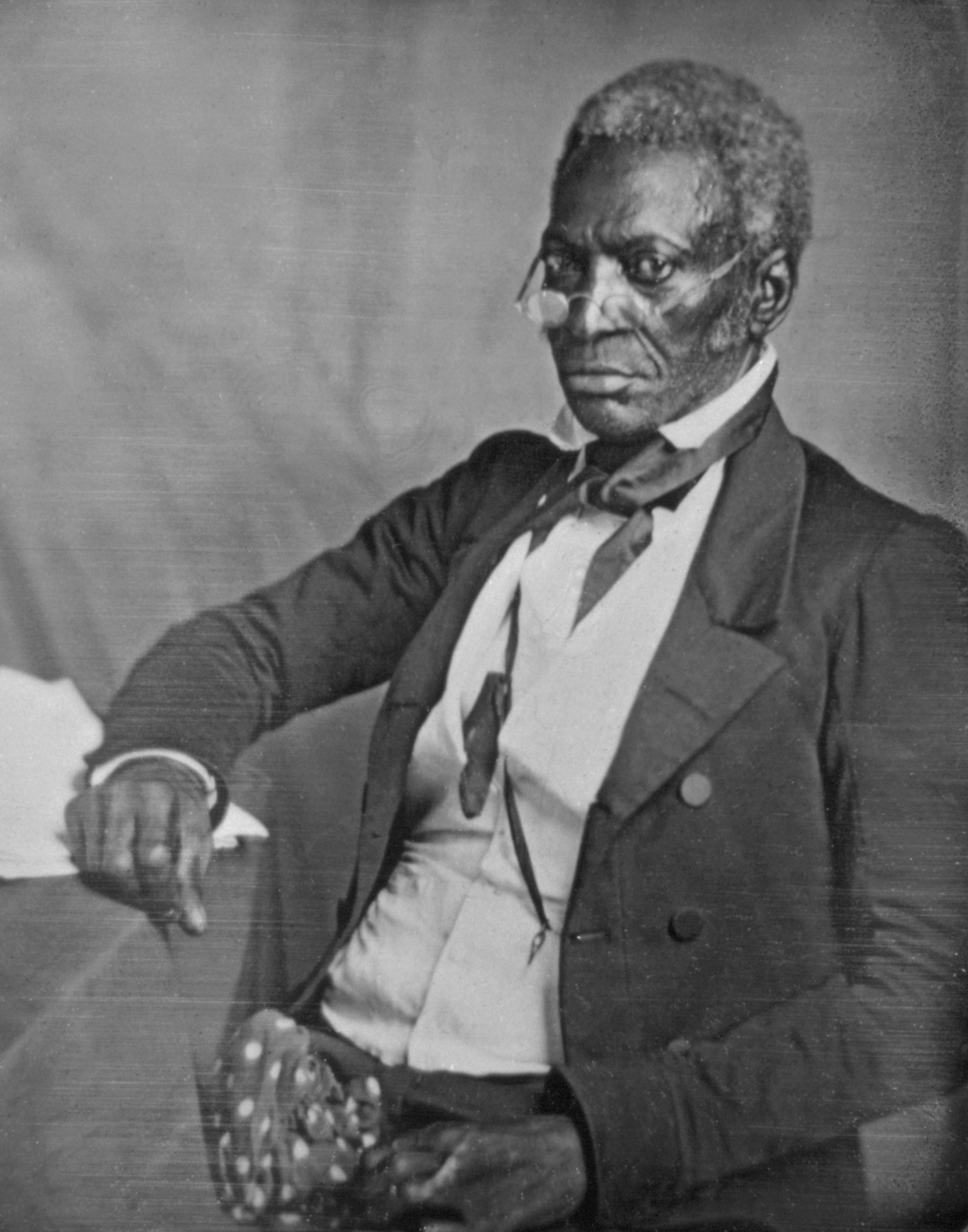
John Hanson, c. 1856, from a daguerreotype attributed to Augustus Washington

John Hanson (died c. 1860) was a politician in Liberia. He served in Colonial Council and as a senator from Grand Bassa County following Liberia's independence in 1847.

Hanson was born into slavery, but purchased his freedom and emigrated from Baltimore to Liberia aged 36. In Liberia, he joined the growing mercantile class. He also served as Commissary in the same county for several years, furnishing a house for the storage of arms and ammunition. Hanson died in 1860, and was mourned as a "faithful and patriotic servant" by Liberian president Stephen Allen Benson.

Senator Hanson has sometimes been misidentified as being John Hanson of Maryland, a white politician who served as a President of the Continental Congress during the American Revolution.
