= Statue of Thomas Cass =

Statue in Boston, Massachusetts, U.S.

Colonel Thomas Cass
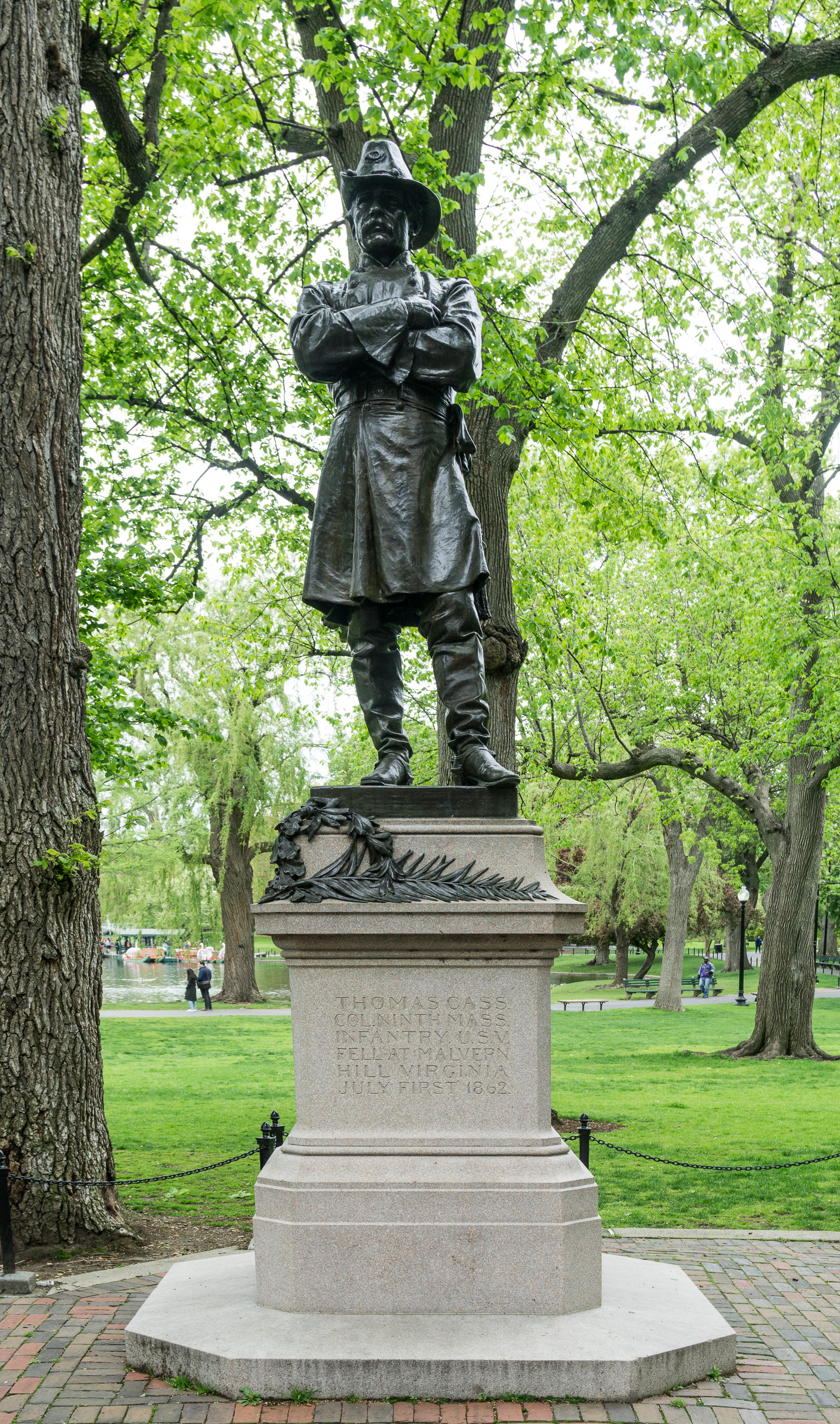
- The statue in 2017
- Artist: Richard E. Brooks
- Year: 1899
- Subject: Thomas Cass
- Location: Boston, Massachusetts, U.S.; 42.352602°N 71.068800°W

A statue of Thomas Cass by Richard E. Brooks, called Colonel Thomas Cass, is installed in Boston's Public Garden, in the U.S. state of Massachusetts.

== Description and history ==
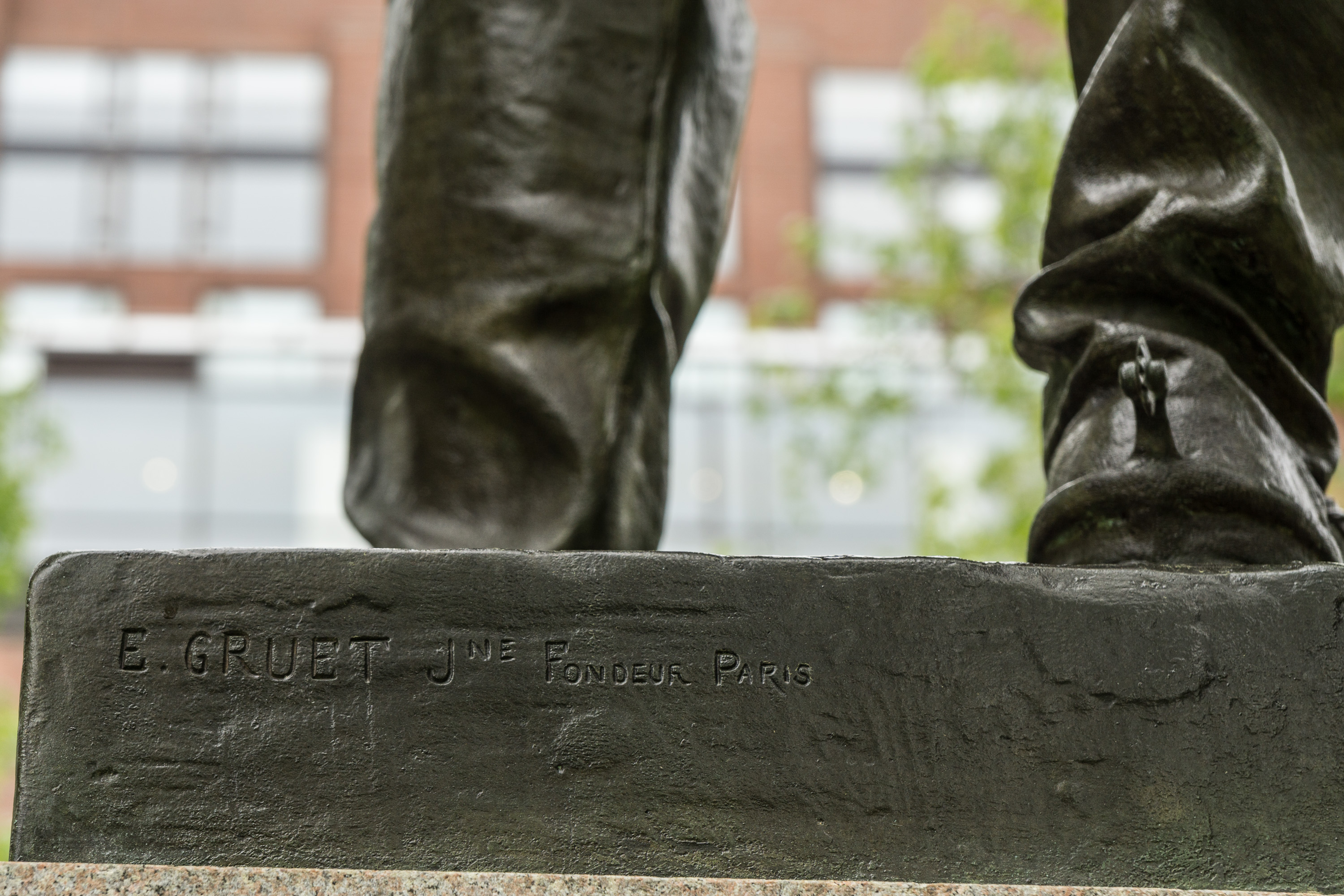
Foundry mark

After a previous statue at the same site was found to be ugly, Brooks was commissioned to design a statue of Cass by the Boston Arts Commission in 1897. The bronze sculpture was cast in 1899 and unveiled on September 22 of the same year. It replaced a previous granite memorial of Cass. The statue earned Brooks a gold medal at the Exposition Universelle of 1900.

The statue depicts Cass in a Civil War uniform with his arms folded across his chest. It measures approximately 8 ft. x 2 ft. 4 in. x 2 ft. 4 in., and rests on a granite base measuring approximately 6 ft. 6 in. x 3 ft. 8 in. x 3 ft. 8 in. The granite came from Red Beach, Maine. The artwork was surveyed as part of the Smithsonian Institution's "Save Outdoor Sculpture!" program in 1993.

The monument has been recognized as an historic feature of the Public Garden, which is listed on the National Register of Historic Places, by the National Park Service.

In 2009, Peters F. Stevens of the Boston Irish Reporter wrote:

A statue of Colonel Cass was erected in the Boston Public Garden, but surviving veterans of his regiment railed that the memorial was both stiff and a poor likeness of the fallen hero. The Society of the Ninth Regiment raised funds to tear down the statue and commissioned noted sculptor Richard E. Brooks to craft a bronze statue of Cass. On September 22, 1899, the striking bronze, which captured the visage and commanding presence of Colonel Thomas Cass and garnered high praise and a prestigious award for Brooks, was unveiled. It stands there today, testimony to a hero – a Boston Irish and American hero.

== See also ==
- 1899 in art
- History of Irish Americans in Boston
