= Statue of John Hanson =

Statue in the U.S. Capitol

John Hanson
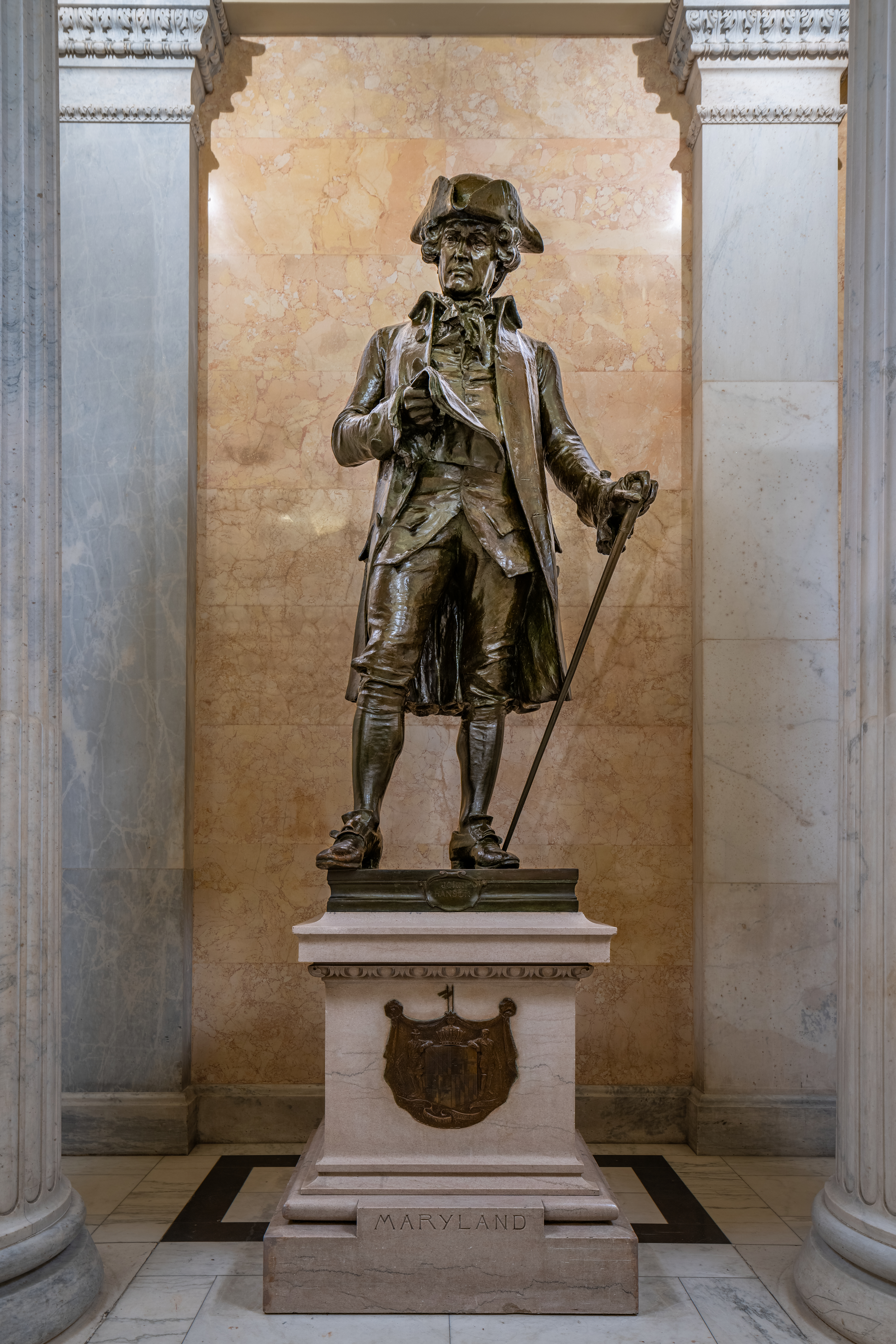
- The statue at the Hall of Columns in 2023
- Artist: Richard E. Brooks
- Medium: Bronze sculpture
- Subject: John Hanson

John Hanson is a bronze statue by Richard E. Brooks of Founding Father John Hanson, installed in the United States Capitol in Washington, D.C., as part of the National Statuary Hall Collection. It is one of two statues donated by the state of Maryland.

Though the statue is dated 1902 it was unveiled on January 31, 1903 by Maryland Senator George Louis Wellington. It portrays Hanson in Colonial-era garb, with a tricorn hat and a cane in his left hand.
