= John Hanson (Jamaican politician) =

Jamaican planter and politician

John Hanson (died between 1829 and 1832) was a planter in Jamaica and the owner of the Salt Pond Pen. He inherited this estate from his father, the planter and slave owner John Hanson. He was elected to the House of Assembly of Jamaica in 1820.

He was married to Elizabeth Williams Hanson, with whom he had three daughters: Sarah Ann Hanson, Jane Curtis Hanson and Susannah Joyce Hanson.
