= John H. L. Hansen =

American academic

- Born: November 17, 1959 (age 66); Plainfield, NJ
- Citizenship: American
- Education: Georgia Institute of Technology; Rutgers University
- Known for: Fundamental Research in Robust Speech & Speaker Recognition under Stress and Noise
- Scientific career
- Fields: Speech Processing; Language Technology
- Workplaces: The University of Texas at Dallas; The University of Colorado at Boulder; Duke University
- Doctoral advisor: Mark A. Clements

John H. L. Hansen (born November 17, 1959, in Plainfield, New Jersey) is professor of electrical engineering (EE) and associate dean for research in Erik Jonsson School of Engineering & Computer Science, at the University of Texas at Dallas (UTD). He is also the University Distinguished Chair in Telecommunications Engineering, and holds a joint appointment as professor in the School of Behavioral and Brain Sciences. He is the son of Henrik Hansen, Danish wrestling champion who won a bronze medal in Greco-Roman wrestling, welterweight class, at the 1948 Summer Olympics in London.

== Education ==
Hansen received the B.S.E.E. degree with the highest honors from Rutgers University, New Brunswick, NJ in 1982. He received the M.S. and Ph.D. degrees in electrical engineering from the Georgia Institute of Technology, Atlanta, Georgia, in 1983 and 1988, respectively.

== Career ==
He started his academic career as assistant professor in the Department of Electrical & Computer Engineering and Department of Biomedical Engineering, Pratt School of Engineering, Duke University, in 1988, where he established the Robust Speech Processing Laboratory, (RSPL) and worked closely with the Duke Medical Center and corporations in Research Triangle Park, NC.

In 1999, he moved to The University of Colorado at Boulder (CU-Boulder), where he served as department chairman and professor in the Department of Speech, Language & Hearing Sciences, and held a joint appointment as professor in the Department of Electrical & Computer Engineering. While at CU-Boulder, he co-founded the Center for Speech and Language Research (CSLR), where he served as associate director from 1999 to 2003.

In 2005, he was named head of the Electrical Engineering Department at the University of Texas at Dallas (UTD), a position he held till November 2012 before he was appointed as associate dean for research in Erik Jonsson School of Engineering & Computer Science at UTDallas. At UTD, he established the Center for Robust Speech Systems (CRSS), which is focused on interdisciplinary research in speech processing, hearing sciences, and language technologies.

== Awards and honors ==
Hansen was the recipient of a Whitaker Foundation Biomedical Research Award in 1993, a National Science Foundation's Research Initiation Award in 1990, and has been named a Lilly Foundation Teaching Fellow for "Contributions to the Advancement of Engineering Education".
