= Thomas Cass (colonel) =

Union Army officer and businessman (1821–1862)

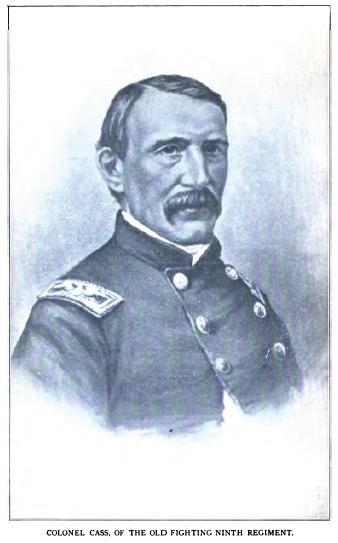
- Colonel Thomas Cass
- Born: c. 1821; Farmly, Queen's County, Ireland
- Died: July 12, 1862 (aged 40–41); Boston, Massachusetts, US
- Burial place: Mount Auburn Cemetery
- Military career
- Allegiance: United States of America; Union
- Branch: (United States) Union Army
- Rank: Colonel
- Commands: 9th Regiment Massachusetts Volunteers
- Conflicts: American Civil War: Mechanicsville; Gaines Mill; Malvern Hill

Colonel Thomas Cass (c. 1821 – July 12, 1862) founded and was commander of the 9th Regiment Massachusetts Volunteer Infantry of the Union Army, which saw extensive service in the American Civil War. Cass was wounded at the Battle of Malvern Hill and died shortly after from his wounds in Boston, Massachusetts. A memorial statue to him stands in the Boston Public Garden.

== Early life ==
Thomas Cass was born in Ireland, in Farmly, Queen's County, in about 1821, and moved to America with his parents, landing in Boston. They settled in the North End of Boston, and after a few years at school, he learned the currier's trade. Later, he joined his father in business, became well known as a businessman in the North End, and served with ability on the school committee.

He was an active member of the Columbian Artillery, Co. B., Fifth Regiment Artillery, M. V. M., and advanced through all the grades in his company to that of captain.

== Service with the 9th Regiment ==
=== Establishment ===
The Ninth Regiment was created on June 11, 1861, under the command of Colonel Cass in Boston, recruiting primarily Irish-Americans. Initial funding for the regiment came from Patrick Donahoe, publisher of the Boston Pilot. Initially bivouacked at Boston's Faneuil Hall, they later camped at Long Island in Boston Harbor.

=== Potomac duty ===
On June 30, 1861, the unit arrived in the Washington, D.C., vicinity and was welcomed by President Abraham Lincoln. They remained in the vicinity of Arlington, Virginia, performing picket duty and building a fort on the Potomac River named Fort Cass after their commanding officer. As a unit of the Army of the Potomac under the command of Major General George B. McClellan, the Ninth Regiment moved south with the rest of the Army in pursuit of Confederate forces.

=== Battle of Mechanicsville ===
On June 26, 1862, the Ninth Regiment participated in the Battle of Mechanicsville, about six miles from Richmond, Virginia, which resulted in a Union Army victory and more than 2,000 Confederate casualties. The next day, the regiment was assigned to hold the bridge over the mill creek in the action that later became known as the Battle of Gaines Mill. The regiment was ordered to hold the bridge pending the arrival of two supporting regiments. The support troops were delayed in their arrival, and the Ninth Regiment successfully repelled several Confederate assaults on the bridge. The supporting troops eventually arrived, but by this point the opposing forces had built their strength and the Ninth was unable to hold the bridge any longer. Eventually, Confederate forces led by General James Longstreet and General Ambrose Powell Hill broke the Union line, forcing the Union Army into retreat. The Ninth Regiment brought up the rear of the retreat, fighting a rearguard action against the opposing forces. The Union Army lost 6,000 killed or wounded in this battle and the Ninth Regiment’s casualties totaled 252 men.

=== Wounded at Malvern Hill ===
The Ninth Regiment participated in the Battle of Malvern Hill on July 1, 1862, as part of the Peninsular Campaign waged by the Union Army, intending to capture the city of Richmond, Virginia. The Ninth Regiment held the hill and prepared it to withstand a siege by the Confederate Army. Supported by five Union gunboats on the nearby James River, and benefiting from favorable geography and extensive defensive preparations, the Union Army withstood repeated charges and inflicted heavy casualties on the Southern forces. It was in this battle that Colonel Cass received the mortal wound in his face and mouth that eventually took his life. When Colonel Cass fell in battle, command of the Ninth Regiment was assumed by Acting Lieutenant Colonel Hawley and Cass was removed from the field. Colonel Hawley was subsequently wounded in the same action, and command fell to Acting Major, Captain O’Leary. The unit’s casualties were very heavy; along with losing their two top commanders, roughly half the regiment was put out of action, totaling 166 men.

=== Death and burial ===
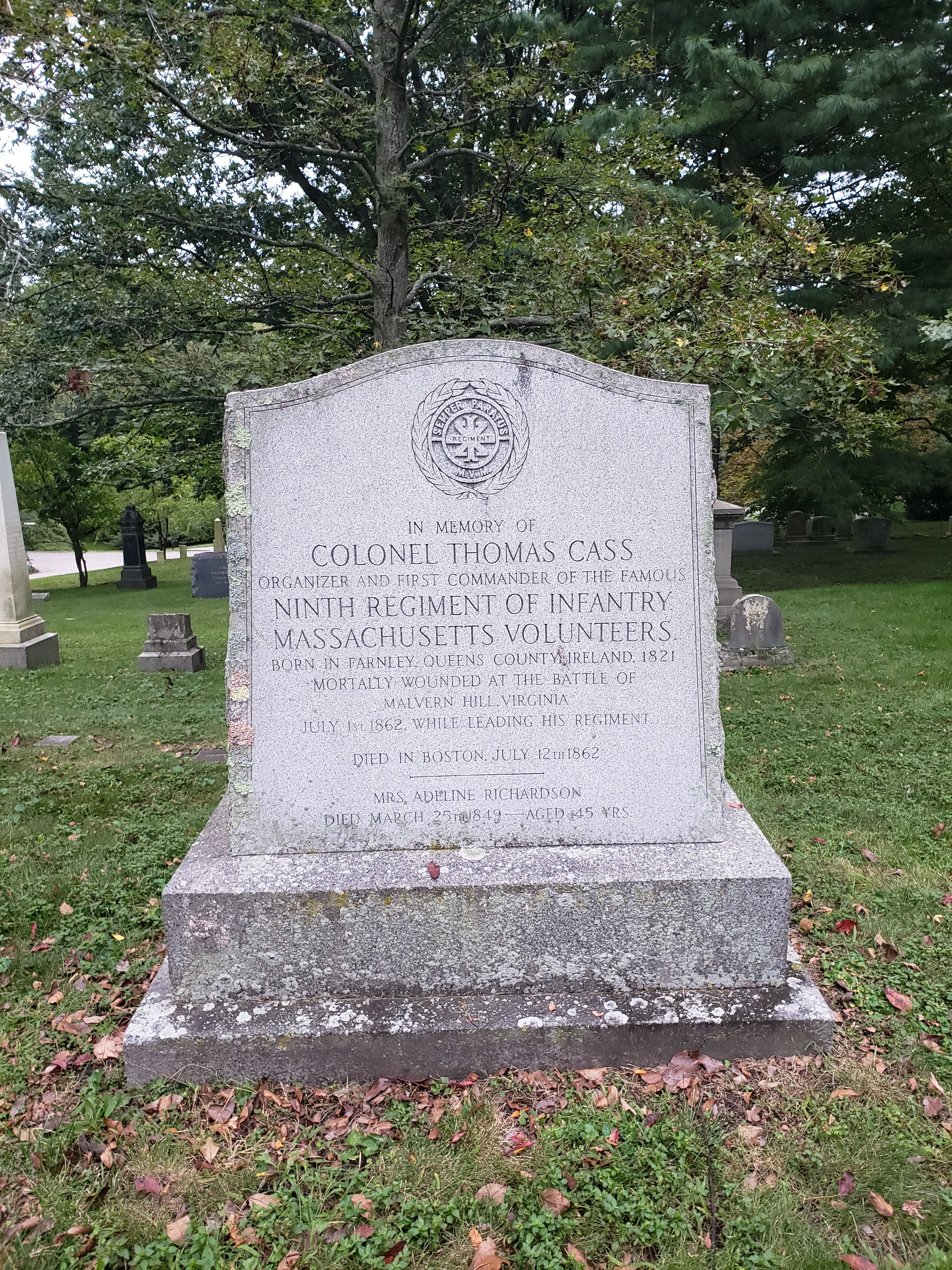
Thomas Cass gravestone in Mount Auburn Cemetery

Cass died in Boston on July 12, and his funeral was attended by Lieutenant-Colonel Guiney, Major Hanley, and other men of the Ninth who were home on sick leave. About this time, the men of the Ninth Regiment heard of his death. Colonel Cass was buried with military honors at Mount Auburn Cemetery, and his widow and children were the chief mourners. His military awards were the Purple Heart and the Medal of Honor.

== Memorial ==
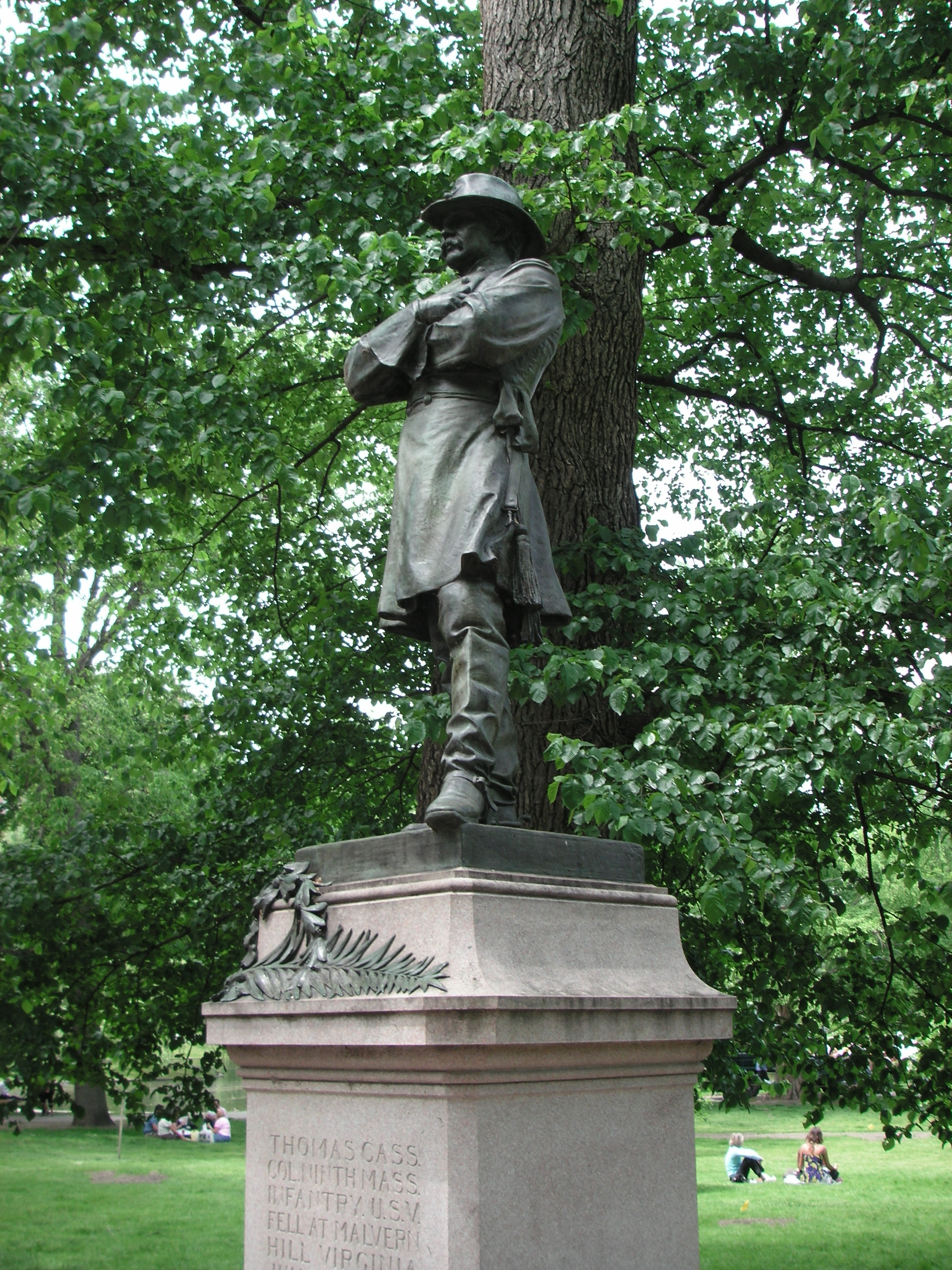
Statue of Thomas Cass in the Boston Public Garden

Some years after Colonel Cass's death, a memorial statue of him was placed in the Boston Public Garden. It was, however, so roundly criticized for its lack of artistic merit that the Society of the Ninth Regiment commissioned sculptor Richard E. Brooks to create a new bronze statue of the Colonel. The new monument was unveiled on September 22, 1899. Brooks received a gold medal for the statue, underscoring the improvement on the original. This statue may be seen today on the south walk of the Public Garden.
