= Richard E. Brooks =

American sculptor (1865–1919)

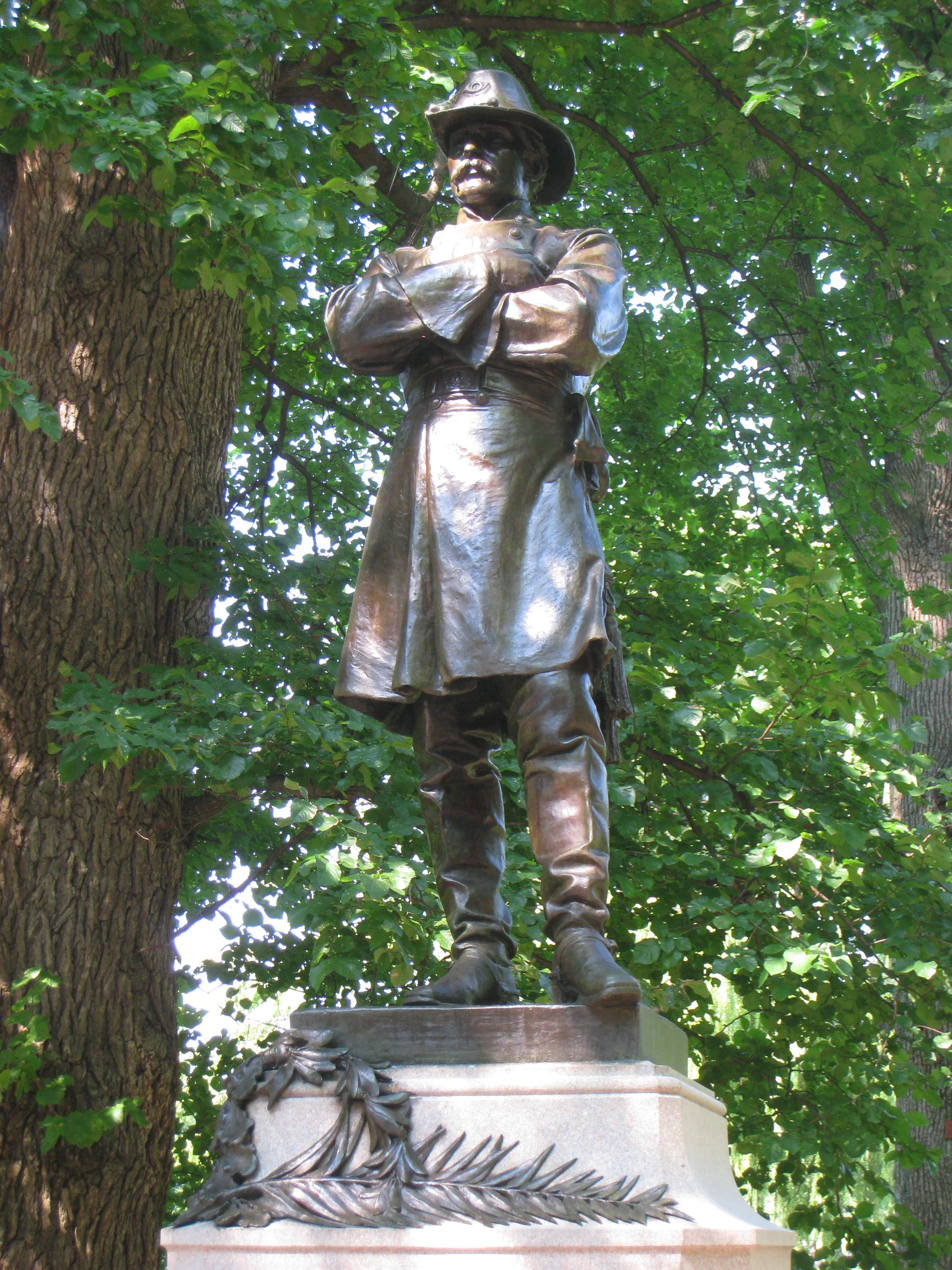
Statue of Thomas Cass by Richard E. Brooks, 1899

Richard Edwin Brooks (1865–1919) was born in Braintree, Massachusetts, studied in Paris under the sculptor Jean-Paul Aubé (1837–1916). His early work Chant de la Vague (Song of the Wave) was idealistic; later works were more conventional statues.

== Notable works ==
- Statue of Thomas Cass, in Boston (1899).
- Bust of Francis Amasa Walker in the Boston Central Library (1899).
- Statues for Maryland in the National Statuary Hall Collection (1903):
  - Charles Carroll
  - John Hanson
- Statue of William Henry Seward, in Seattle (1909) for the Alaska–Yukon–Pacific Exposition and moved to Volunteer Park in 1910.
- Statue of Robert Treat Paine (a Signer of the Declaration of Independence) in Taunton, Massachusetts (1904)
- Statue of John H. McGraw, in Seattle (1913).

== Gallery ==
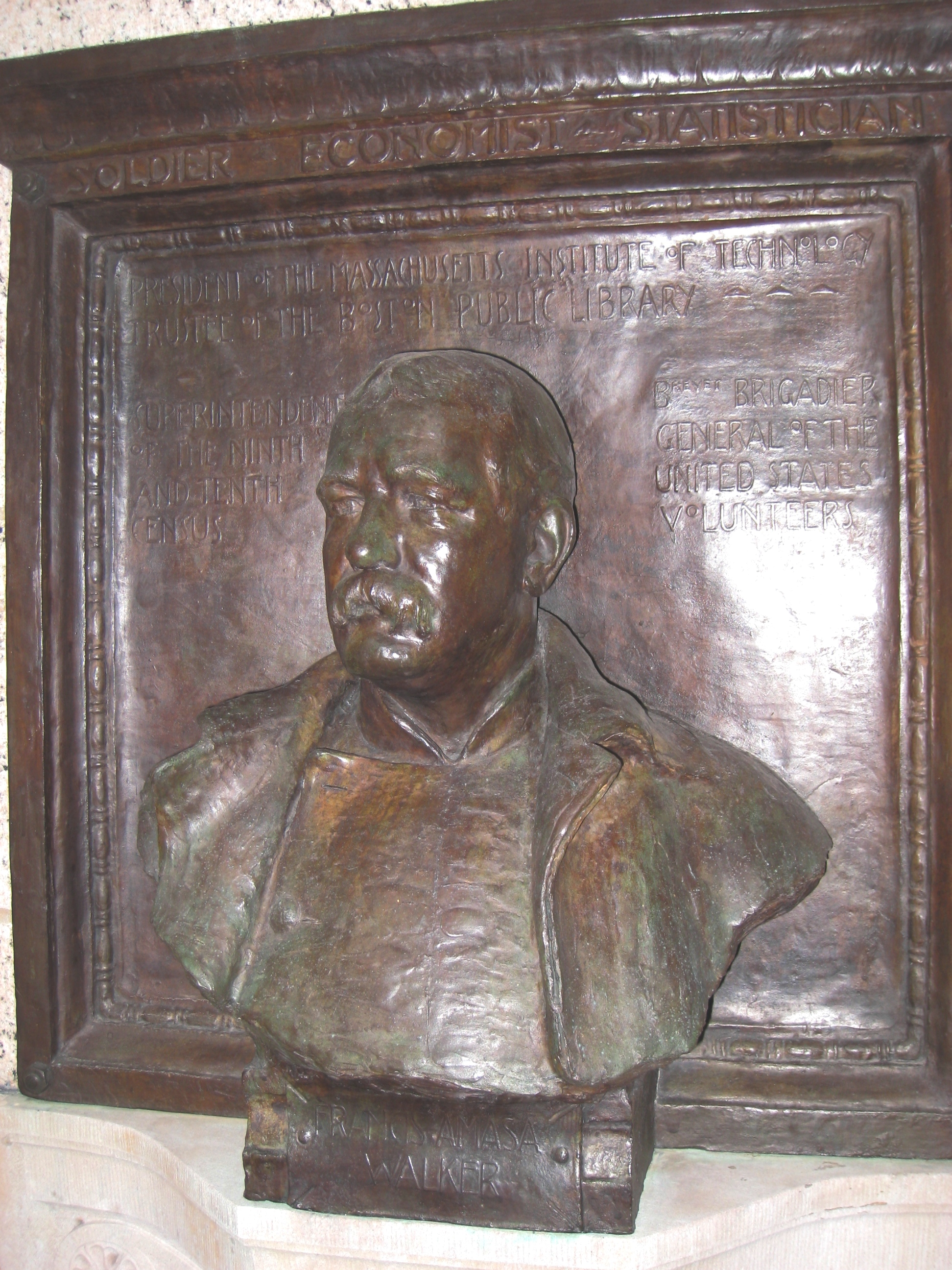
Francis Amasa Walker, 1899

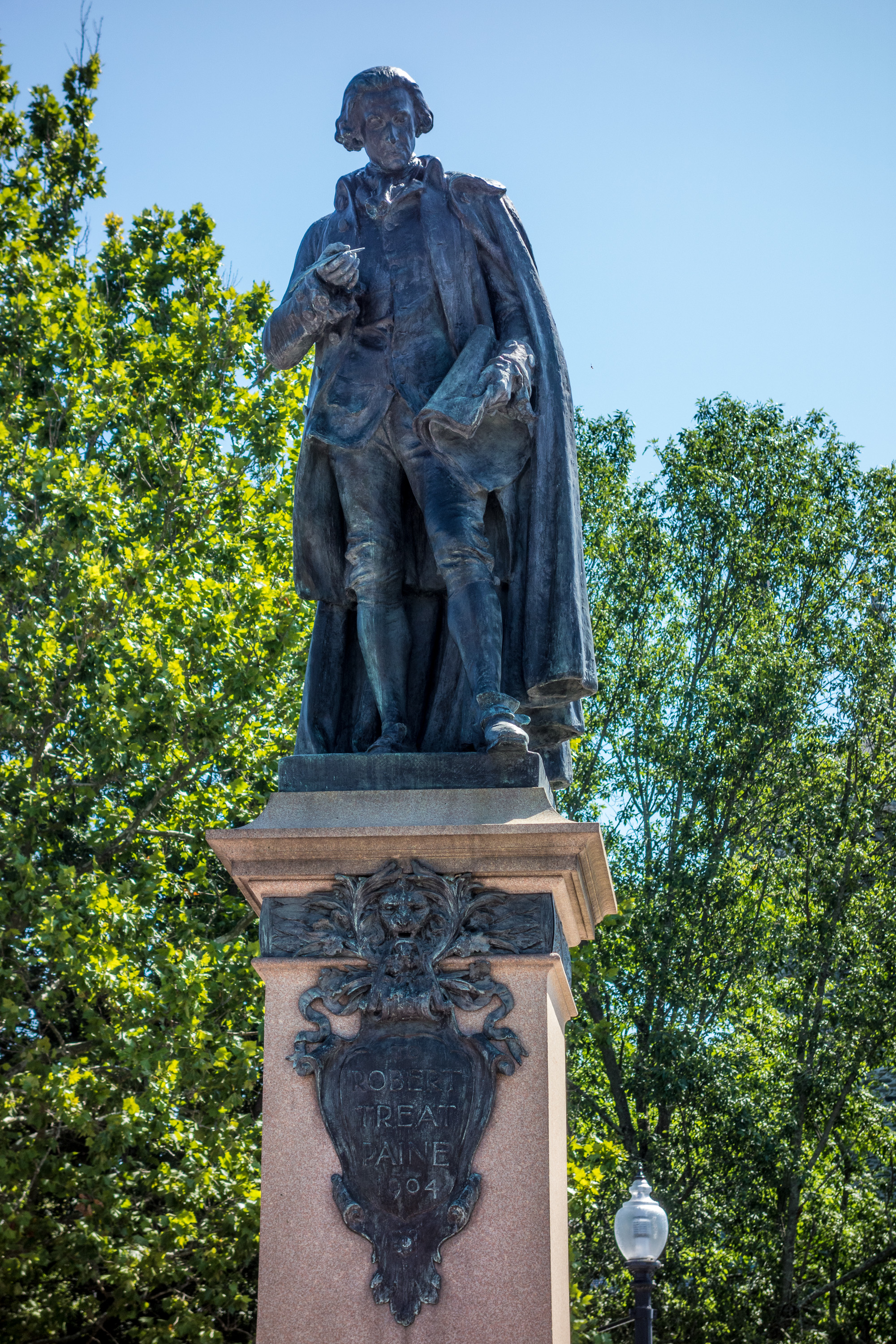
Robert Treat Paine, 1904

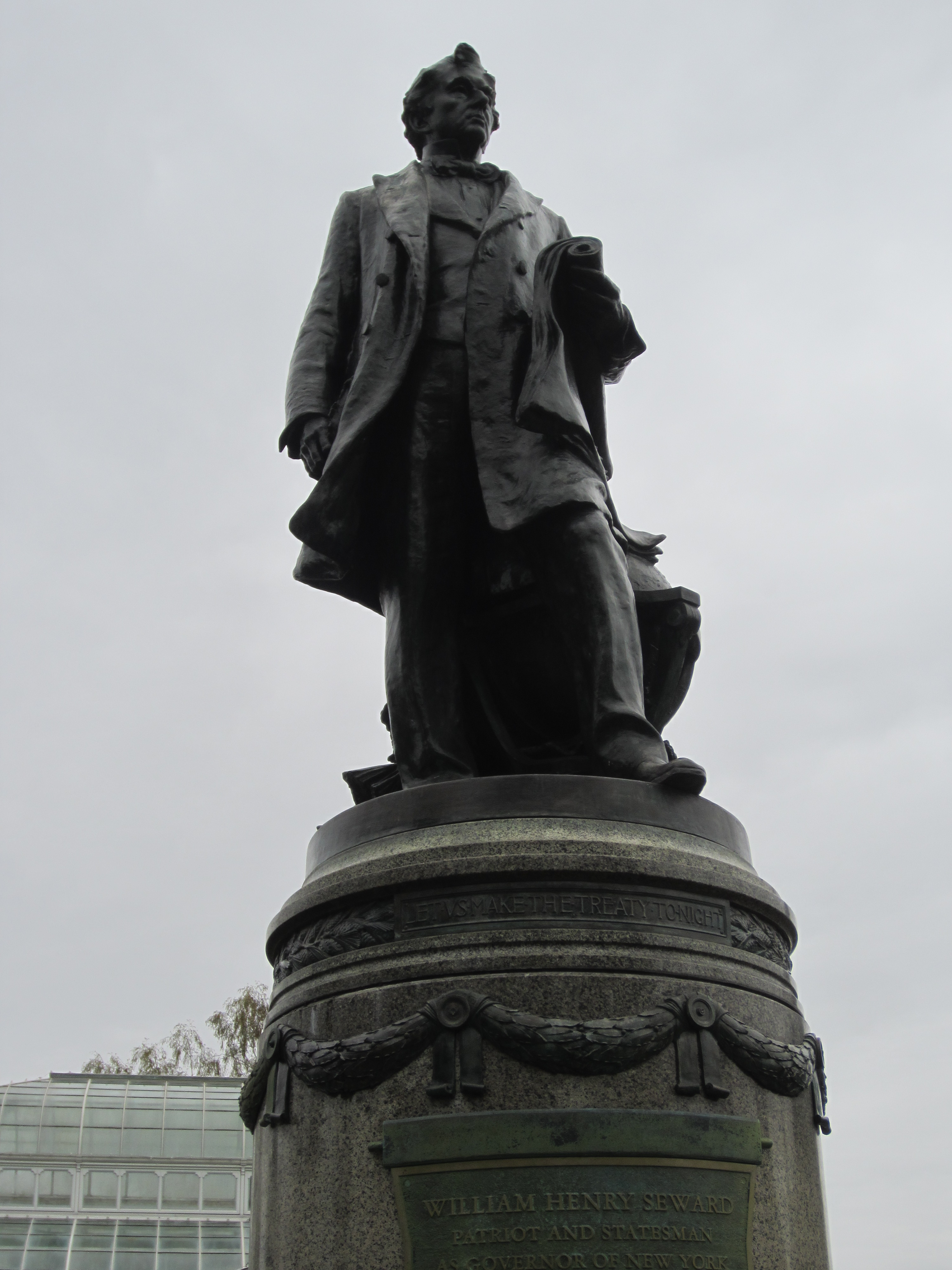
William Henry Seward, 1909

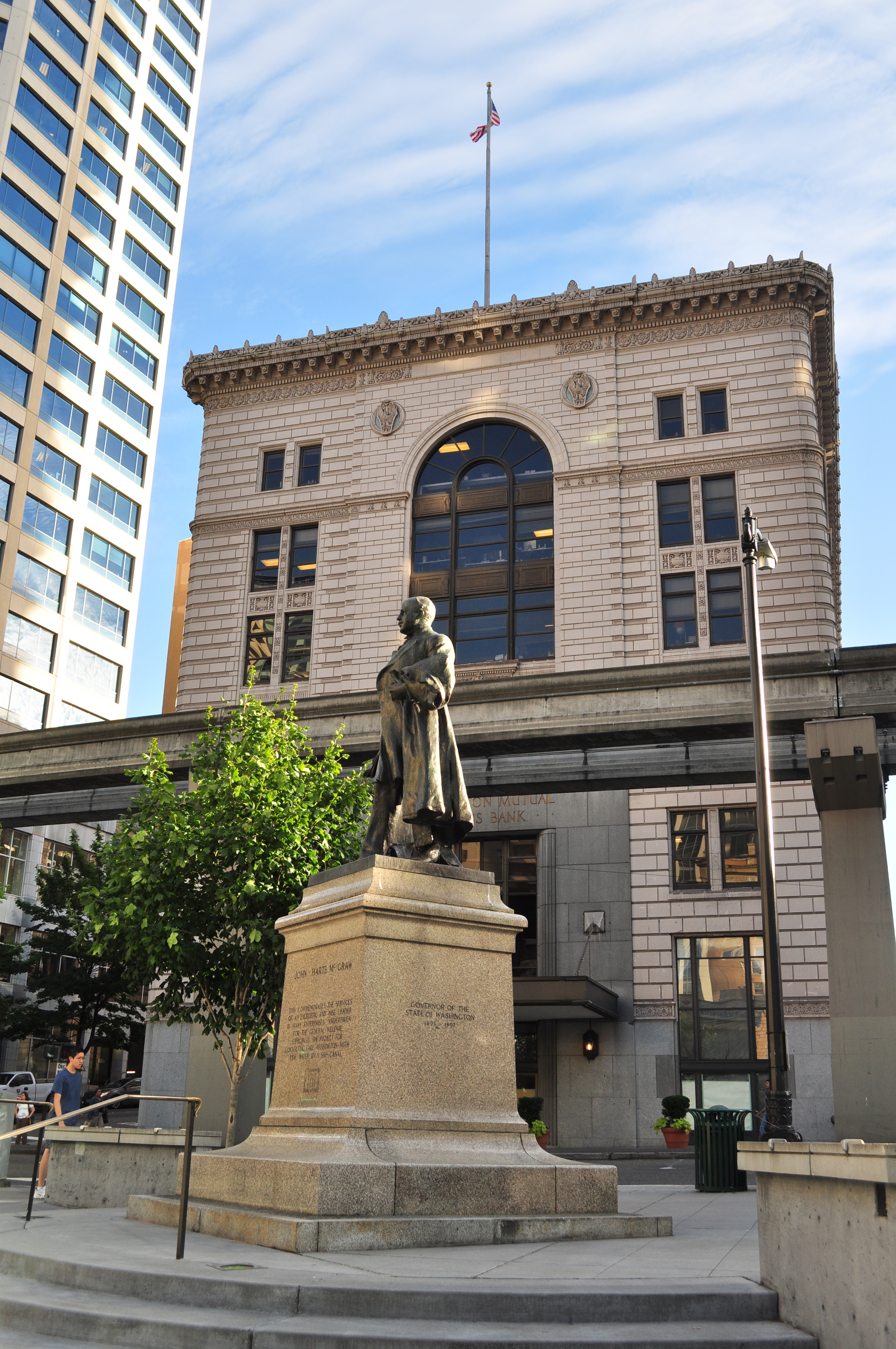
Statue of John McGraw, 1913

== Honors ==
- Elected to National Sculpture Society (1897).
- Gold medal in sculpture at the Buffalo Pan-American Exposition 1901.
- Elected to American Academy of Arts and Letters in 1908.
