= Irish Heritage Trail =

Historical walking trail in Boston, Massachusetts

- Length: 3 mi (4.8 km)
- Location: Boston, Massachusetts
- Established: 1994
- Trailheads: Rose Kennedy Garden to Fenway Park
- Use: Walking, History
- Difficulty: Easy
- Sights: 20 historical sites
- Website: www.irishheritagetrail.com

The Irish Heritage Trail, a heritage trail in Boston, Massachusetts, was created in June 1994 as a way of highlighting the history of Irish Americans in Boston through its landmarks.

== Structure ==
The self-guided walk in Boston and Back Bay is approximately 3 miles (5 km) in length. It starts at the Rose Kennedy Garden on Boston's waterfront and ends at Fenway Park in the Fens. The trail contains 20 sites in Boston, including the Back Bay area, and an additional 20 sites in Boston's neighborhoods. It is managed by Boston Irish Tourism Association.

In 2025, Boston Irish Tourism Association officials announced it was adding five new landmarks to the Irish Heritage Trail, including the iconic Swan Boats in the Public Garden, launched in 1877 by Irish immigrants. In August, 2025, the tourism association announced it was adding the new Tom Brady statue to the Irish Heritage Trail in the months ahead. Tom Brady's ancestors emigrated from Ireland to Boston during the famine years of the 19th century, and lived in Boston a few years before moving out west to California.

== Coverage ==
The Irish Heritage Trail was featured on the nightly New England show on WCVB. In 2019, the Irish Echo newspaper in New York ran a story on the 25th anniversary of the Irish Heritage Trail.

The Worcester Telegram also announced that an Irish Heritage Trail was being developed in Central Massachusetts.

== Trail sites ==
Points on the trail include:

1. Rose Kennedy Garden
2. Kevin White Statue
3. James Michael Curley Statues
4. Boston City Hall
5. Boston Irish Famine Memorial
6. Granary Burying Ground
7. Colonel Shaw Memorial
8. Massachusetts State House
9. Soldiers & Sailors Memorial
10. Commodore John Barry Memorial
11. Boston Massacre Memorial
12. Central Burying Grounds
13. Colonel Thomas Cass Statue
14. David I. Walsh Statue
15. Maurice Tobin Statue
16. Patrick Collins Memorial
17. John S. Copley Statue
18. Boston Public Library
19. John Boyle O'Reilly Memorial
20. Fenway Park
