= CBS 21 =

CBS 21 may refer to one of the following television stations in the United States:

== Current ==
- KNBN-DT2 in Rapid City, South Dakota
- WECP-LD in Panama City, Florida
- WHP-TV in Harrisburg, Pennsylvania

== Former ==
- WNHT in Concord, New Hampshire (1988 to 1989)
