= Channel 68 =

Channel 68 refers to several television stations:

== Canada ==
The following television stations broadcast on analog channel 68 (UHF frequencies covering 794-800 MHz) in Canada:

- CISR-TV in Santa Rosa, British Columbia

== See also ==
- Channel 68 virtual TV stations in the United States
