= WBPX-TV =

Television station in Boston

WBPX-TV and WPXG-TV
WBPX-TV: Boston, Massachusetts; WPXG-TV: Concord–Manchester, New Hampshire; United States
- Channels for WBPX-TV: Digital: 22 (UHF), shared with WDPX-TV; Virtual: 68
- Channels for WPXG-TV: Digital: 23 (UHF), shared with WYDN; Virtual: 21

Programming
- Affiliations: 68.1: Ion Television; for others, see § Technical information and subchannels

Ownership
- Owner: Ion Media; (Ion Media Boston License, LLC)
- Sister stations: WDPX-TV

History
- First air date: WBPX-TV: January 2, 1979; WPXG-TV: September 1, 1995 (Note: In this capacity. The first use of this license was from April 16, 1984, to March 31, 1989, as WNHT.)
- Former call signs: WBPX-TV: WQTV (1979–1993); WABU (1993–1999); WPXG-TV: WNBU (1995–1999)
- Former channel number: WBPX-TV: Analog: 68 (UHF, 1979–2009); Digital: 32 (UHF, 2004–2019); WPXG-TV: Analog: 21 (UHF, 1995–2009); Digital: 33 (UHF, 2003–2019)
- Former affiliations: WBPX-TV: Independent (1979–1999); FNN (secondary, 1981–1984)
- Call sign meaning: WBPX-TV: "Boston Pax"

Technical information
- Licensing authority: FCC
- Facility ID: WBPX-TV: 7692; WPXG-TV: 48406
- ERP: WBPX-TV: 150 kW; WPXG-TV: 80.6 kW
- HAAT: WBPX-TV: 334.59 m (1,098 ft); WPXG-TV: 342 m (1,122 ft)
- Transmitter coordinates: WBPX-TV: 42°23′2.7″N 71°29′35.3″W; WPXG-TV: 43°11′4″N 71°19′10″W

Links
- Public license information: WBPX-TV: Public file; LMS; WPXG-TV: Public file; LMS
- Website: iontelevision.com

WBPX-TV (channel 68) is a television station in Boston, Massachusetts, United States, airing programming from the Ion Television network. It is owned by the Ion Media subsidiary of the E. W. Scripps Company, which also owns Woburn-licensed Grit station WDPX-TV (channel 58); the two channels share the same TV spectrum. WBPX-TV and WDPX-TV are broadcast from a tower on Parmenter Road in Hudson, Massachusetts.

WBPX-TV's programming is duplicated on WPXG-TV (channel 21) in Concord, New Hampshire, which shares its channel with Lowell, Massachusetts–licensed Daystar station WYDN (channel 48) and broadcasts from Fort Mountain near Epsom, New Hampshire.

WBPX-TV began broadcasting as WQTV in 1979 and originally broadcast subscription television programming to paying customers, which ended in 1983, with the station operating as a full-time commercial independent station until succumbing to financial troubles and paring back its programming. After being sold to The Christian Science Monitor in 1986, WQTV became the nucleus of a major production operation, which in 1991 spawned a cable television channel, the Monitor Channel. After $325 million in losses, this service shut down in 1992, and The Monitor sold WQTV to Boston University, which operated it for six years as commercial independent WABU. Boston University also bought the Concord station, which had been silent since it failed as CBS affiliate WNHT in 1989, and turned it into a satellite of WABU in 1995. Both stations were sold in 1999 to become outlets of the Pax network, which changed its name to i in 2005 before becoming known as Ion in 2007.

== Early history ==
=== The subscription television years ===
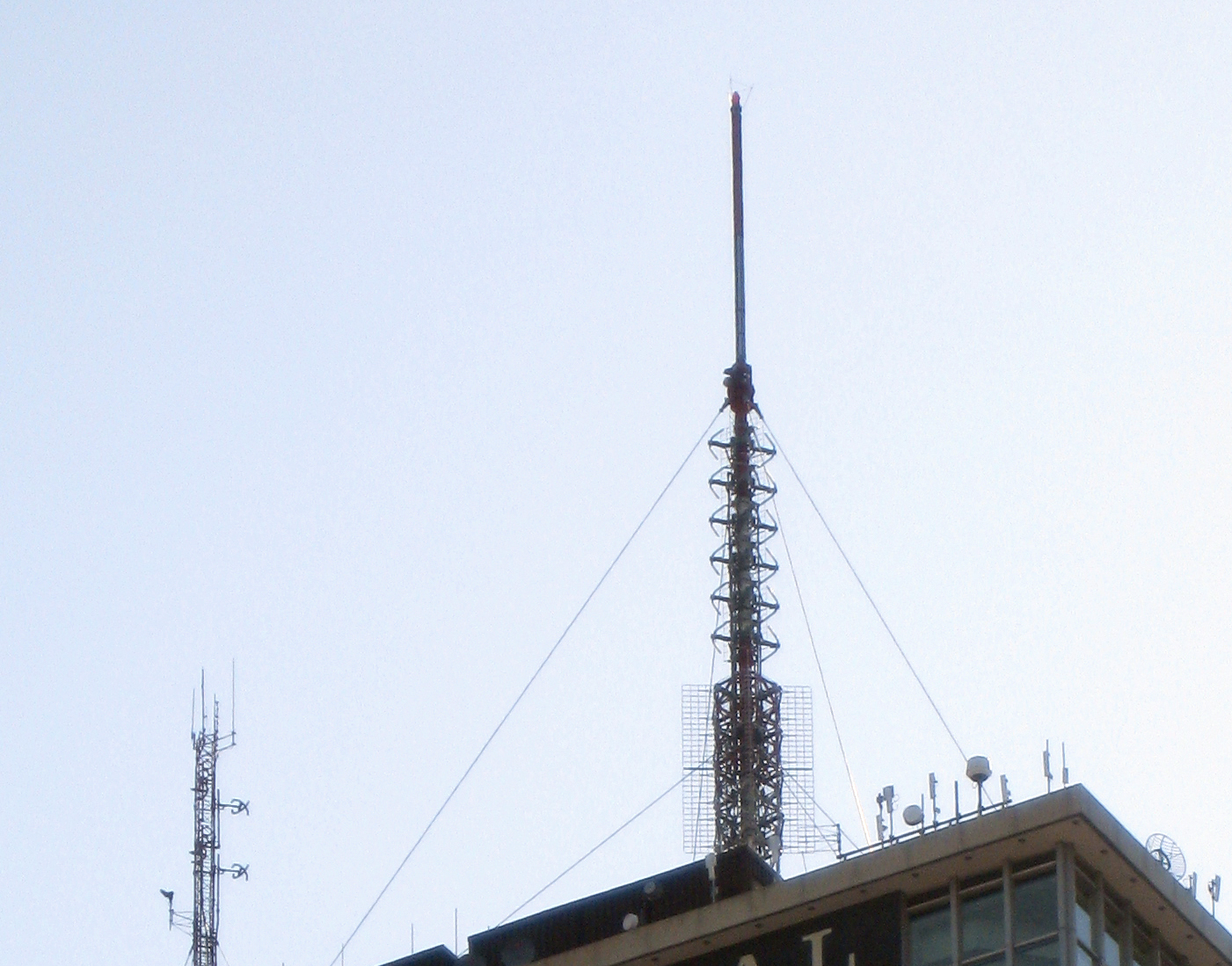
WQTV originally broadcast from an antenna (pictured) atop the Prudential Tower.

On June 3, 1966, Boston Heritage Broadcasting, Inc.—a consortium of local owners and New Jersey–based Blonder-Tongue Laboratories—filed an application for a construction permit for channel 68 in Boston, which the Federal Communications Commission (FCC) granted on September 23, 1969, after a comparative hearing. Boston Heritage then filed the third-ever application for authority to install subscription television (STV) equipment in July 1970, which the FCC granted three years later.

Even though a construction permit had been awarded in 1969, it would be nearly a decade before channel 68 broadcast. By late 1977, Boston Heritage had begun work to build the transmitter on the Prudential Tower, and Blonder-Tongue's pay-TV system was already in use in the New York area. The subscription television programs to be aired on the station would come from Universal Subscription Television, a subsidiary of Canadian company CanWest Capital Corporation. CanWest was in the middle of assembling a network of stations to air its programming, with outlets in various stages of consideration on New York's Long Island and in Detroit, Minneapolis, and Sacramento.

WQTV began program testing at the very end of 1978 and regular programming on January 2, 1979. The subscription service, named BEST at launch, became known as StarCase in May 1979. That month, the station's only non-subscription programs were paid-for ethnic and religious hours. Universal was prompted to abandon its plan to sign up subscribers by area because prospective customers kept calling, having dialed past channel 56 to see the new station on their sets. Further interest was sparked when StarCase began broadcasting adult films in late-night hours.

Universal Subscription Television was acquired in two parts during the course of 1981 by Satellite Television & Associated Resources (STAR) of Santa Monica, California; after acquiring franchises for unbuilt services on stations in San Jose (KSTS) and Detroit (WGPR-TV) in January, STAR then spent $20.5 million (equivalent to $59.7 million in 2025 dollars) to acquire the Boston StarCase service and another $600,000 for WQTV itself. The service was rebranded Star with the sale. Star offered partial-season coverage of the Boston Celtics to subscribers in the 1981–82 season, mostly because cable carrier PRISM New England was not available on the Boston cable system at the time.

Channel 68 was not the only purveyor of subscription television programming in Massachusetts; alongside a microwave distribution system carrying HBO, its primary over-the-air competition came from Preview, owned by American Television and Communications (ATC)—the cable division of Time, Inc.—and broadcast on WSMW-TV from Worcester. By June 1982, generally the zenith of STV's existence nationally, Star was the 8th-largest service in the nation with 52,000 subscribers; Preview was the 7th-largest with 60,000.

Beginning in late 1982, subscription television began to decline as an industry due to increased penetration of cable services. Satellite Television & Associated Resources would be one of the first and highest-profile failures in the industry. At the end of January, Star's 23,000 remaining subscribers received Preview program guides for February; the end for Star came on the night of February 12, when customers were confronted with a graphic slide after a second mortgage holder foreclosed on the operation and sold its assets privately. Preview bought the subscriber list and temporarily simulcast most of its programming on both channels 68 and 27 until it could switch Star's subscribers to Preview equipment. At the end of March, Satellite Television & Associated Resources, with $12 million (equivalent to $31.7 million in 2025 dollars) in liabilities, was forced into Chapter 7 bankruptcy by three movie studios and an advertising company in Los Angeles.

=== "Where the Stars Shine" ===
Handy-man special. A station in search of an image, Ch. 68 relies on worn-out shows like I Dream of Jeannie and The Flying Nun in the prime-time slot. Weak signal and low ratings, station failed to garner even 1 percent of the viewing audience in the latest ratings period report by the Nielsen Co.

— Gregory A. Patterson, The Boston Globe, on the situation of WQTV in 1986

Preview's transitional service for former Star customers and promotional messages for Preview occupied WQTV's evening hours until September 5, 1983, when channel 68 launched a new ad-supported evening lineup. The station's existing daytime programming from the Financial News Network (FNN) was joined by syndicated fare including Kojak, Barnaby Jones and Tic-Tac-Dough. The new programming proved popular enough that the FNN daytime programming was discontinued on April 2, 1984.

WQTV became an aggressive buyer of programs and an aggressive promoter of its programming. The station relocated its studios to a site on Soldiers Field Road in Brighton. It managed to see ratings increases, and sales nearly doubled in 1985 to $4.2 million ($10.4 million in 2025 dollars). However, the early 1980s had brought a boom in independent stations and rapid increases in the prices for syndicated programming that formed the backbone of these stations. WQTV succumbed in December 1985 and laid off all except "the essential operating staff"—dismissing more than half of its 40 workers—in a desperate bid to cut costs; it also put itself on the market. Many popular programs were axed by the station because they had become too expensive, while WQTV's national sales representative resigned from the position and began considering "further action" to obtain back payments. Clifford Curley, the general manager, managed to get the station to turn an operating profit in the first months of 1986 by subsisting on pre-1948 films, any and every network show turned down by the local affiliates, and other titles it owned in perpetuity, along with aggressively promoting the studios for lease to industrial filmmakers.

Within six months of going on the market, it had been joined by two competing independent stations: WXNE-TV (channel 25) and WSBK-TV (channel 38), with stronger programming portfolios and higher asking prices. Emerson College, owner of noncommercial WERS, was invited to make a bid.

== Christian Science Monitor ownership ==
On May 28, 1986, The Christian Science Monitor, a daily newspaper owned by the Boston-based Church of Christ, Scientist, announced it would purchase WQTV for $7.5 million (equivalent to $18.2 million in 2025 dollars). It was the first broadcasting property to be owned by The Monitor, though the long-running publication had been involved in electronic media for nearly a decade with a news service for commercial radio stations, begun in 1977, and the half-hour Monitoradio program distributed through American Public Radio. The transaction closed six months later, by which time channel 68 had essentially fallen out of contention in the Boston market. After selling the station, former owner WQTV, Inc., was forced into Chapter 7 bankruptcy liquidation by program distributors at the start of 1987; MCA Television, Paramount Television and 20th Century Fox Television alleged they had not been paid in six months. The Christian Science Monitor Syndicate was formed to serve as WQTV's licensee to comply with equal employment opportunity laws for broadcasters; The Monitor itself employed only Christian Scientists.

The Monitor hired Allan Ginsberg, the former vice president of Metromedia, and announced that it would not operate WQTV with an all-religious lineup; instead, channel 68 would feature commercial programs along with some programming already produced by the newspaper, such as the weekly Christian Science Monitor Reports, which was distributed through Independent Network News to 88 stations across the country. This program had debuted as a monthly show in 1985, though it aired in off hours and often on smaller, lesser-viewed stations. It had reason to begin an extensive expansion into broadcasting: the newspaper was prestigious but a longtime money-loser for Christian Science.

They had gone and built this whole apparatus, bought a lot of equipment, hired a lot of people, and they didn't know what to do. They were wading into the ocean and found that the water was deeper than they thought.

— Sanford Socolow, on the situation prior to the launch of World Monitor

The Monitor-produced programming was restructured in September 1988, when World Monitor, a half-hour international news program hosted by former NBC News correspondent John Hart, debuted on WQTV in Boston and nationally on The Discovery Channel; the program almost aired on A&E, but Monitor executive John H. Hoagland, Jr., turned it down for a higher-priced offer from Discovery, a decision he would later regret. The original concept for World Monitor involved four co-anchors in Boston, London, Tokyo and Washington; this was scrapped when Hoagland hired Sanford Socolow, former executive producer of the CBS Evening News, who deemed the concept unworkable. The new program debuted to favorable reviews in the national media.

The introduction of World Monitor presaged a total programming change in April 1989; WQTV dropped almost all of its remaining entertainment programming—retaining just a handful of nature and children's shows—and began offering a suite of new Monitor-produced public affairs programs. The move was ordered by Hoagland, an ex-CIA officer and head of the Christian Science Publishing Society who became chair of the new Monitor television operation, against the advice of broadcast consultants; the new programs would appeal to the psychographic of the "global citizen" as opposed to demographics typically used in television targeting. Newer, more expensive consultants were then hired; one television producer noted that these consultants "talked The Monitor into incredible expenses" that amounted to a "flagrant waste of money", while a church member described the new consultants as "yes-men". An unsolicited $25 million ($54.9 million in 2025 dollars) offer for WQTV, made in 1988 by a group of outside investors, was rejected as a new project emerged on the horizon, using the internal name of "TV: Special Programming"—a 24-hour cable television service.

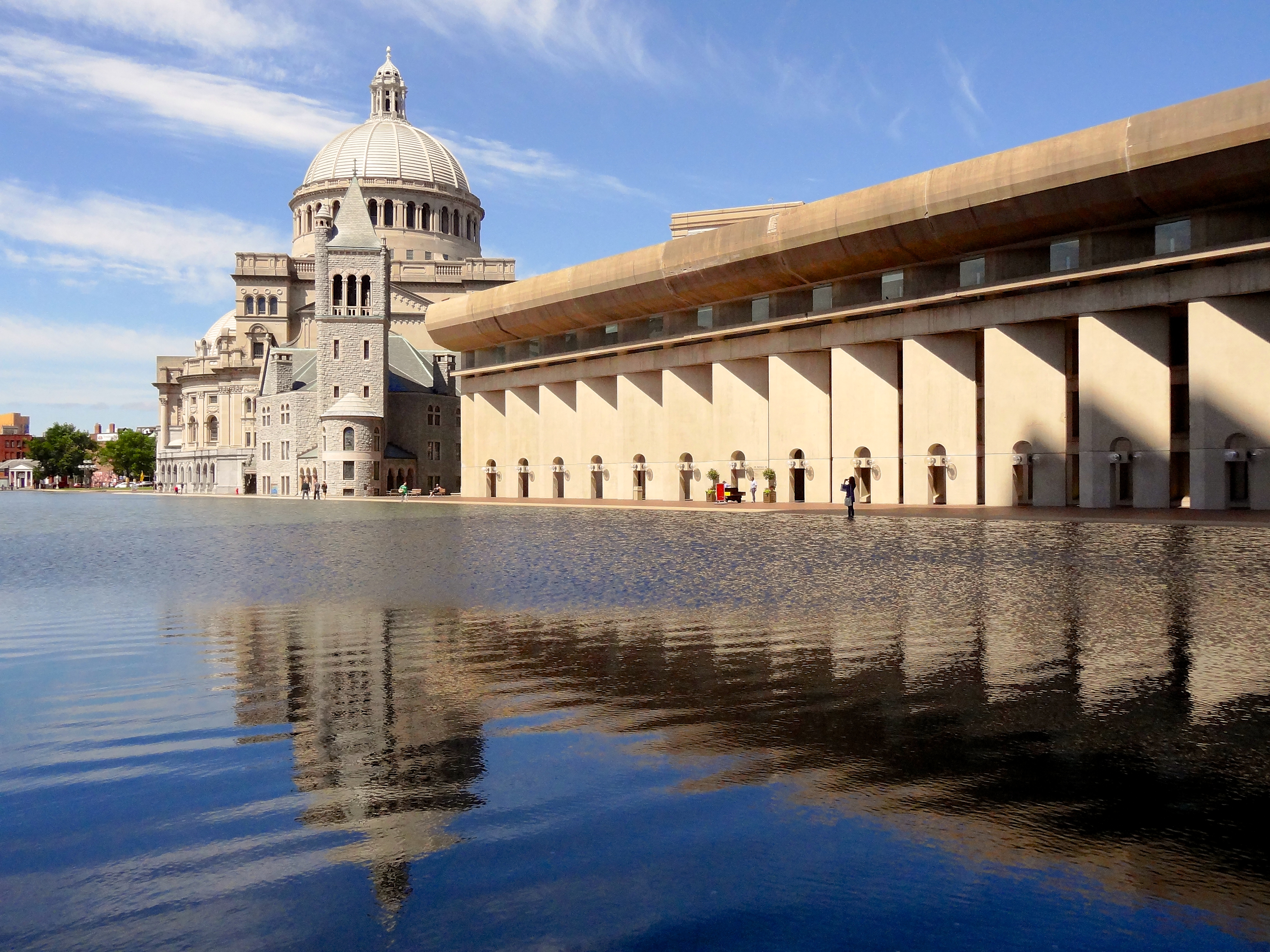
The Colonnade Building of the Christian Science Center housed The Monitor's production facilities, separate from WQTV's Brighton site.

Even though ratings dropped precipitously for channel 68 after the removal of many of the syndicated shows, with the network plan well into development but still not publicly announced, Monitor officials forged ahead and announced they would add another 24 hours a week of new output on WQTV by early 1990, intending to syndicate some of it nationally. Programs on the air at this time included the newsmagazine One Norway Street; Today's Monitor, featuring looks at stories in that day's newspaper; the Spanish-language Monitor de Hoy, the first-ever Spanish-language TV show in Boston; 50 Years Ago Today, featuring excerpts from 50-year-old issues of The Monitor; and the weekly minority-oriented Inner City Beat, hosted by longtime Monitor journalist Luix Overbea. Religious programs featured in only a limited capacity: a daily Bible lesson and a five-minute reading of the religious article in The Monitor. This was supplemented by foreign-purchased programs, such as the 42-part Japanese documentary The Silk Road. Some of the new programs found their way to the WWOR EMI Service, the superstation feed of New York television station WWOR-TV, which was created at the start of 1990 to substitute some of the New York station's programming due to new syndication exclusivity rules. By 1990, World Monitor alone cost some $20 million ($58.2 million in 2025 dollars) a year to produce; that same year, Canadian journalist Peter Kent joined as reporter and substitute anchor, a post he would hold until the program ceased production in 1992.

=== The Monitor Channel ===
I don't think it could be profitable any time in the foreseeable future, and I probably shouldn't say this, just as a Boston operation. Yes [it can be profitable] if this can be a springboard to national distribution.

— John H. Hoagland, Jr., member of the WQTV board, on channel 68's new format in 1989

At the 1990 National Cable Television Association conference in Atlanta, The Monitor announced its plans to launch the Monitor Channel, a full-time cable television channel growing out of the newspaper's television output already seen on WQTV that would launch in May 1991. The new service would aim itself at people who were not frequent television viewers with a range of substantive, globally minded programs.

The Monitor Channel soft-launched on May 1, 1991 (with the official start date of May 15), into a crowded landscape. Between regulatory paralysis and a lack of channel capacity, a number of new channel launches at the start of the decade were struggling to get traction; Hoagland believed that the new service could wait out early lean years because most of its expenses were tied up in existing radio and WQTV operations. The launch was a major risk for the Monitor Syndicate. WQTV's programming was seen as in-depth but slow in pace and was not garnering audience interest in Boston, an image that would transfer to the Monitor Channel. At WQTV, the only show getting ratings attention of any variety was a weekly airing of Star Trek: The Next Generation, and Monitor Television president Netty Douglass admitted to Variety that the station had lost as much as $10 million a year prior to restoring some of its catalog of syndicated shows to its schedule. However, major expenditures were made, including $14 million in newsgathering equipment.

As early as April 1990, when ABC's World News Tonight ran a report on the financial losses of the Monitor television division, concern arose among some within The Christian Science Monitor about the scope and priority placed on the broadcasting operation. Even before the Monitor Channel launched, several maneuvers prompted financial questions: church officials were touring the country urging an increase in contributions, while the Monitor Channel began to court outside investment. In April 1991, the church was revealed to have transferred $25 million (equivalent to $51.2 million in 2025 dollars) from its retirement fund to its general fund, sparking more concerns. Dissidents in the church complained of losing jobs or being warned of potential excommunication for criticizing the board of trustees.

[The Monitor's approach to television] made you scratch your head all the time. I think their chances in the short run are next to nil. I don't think they're dealing with reality.

— Bob Klein, television consultant, on the channel's launch

While the Monitor Channel featured many of the same shows seen in Boston on WQTV, World Monitor could not be scheduled on the national service because of the existing Discovery contract. New shows included one helmed by comedian Mort Sahl. In the early months, the Monitor Channel performed well. With four million homes signed up in a difficult environment, regional Emmy and other awards for its programming, positive media reception, and new shows coming to air on a regular basis, the channel seemed set up for long-term success.

That fall, World Monitor—the most widely available Monitor program, with a national viewership of 450,000—underwent turmoil. Hart resigned on October 31, 1991, citing differences over the religious mission of the church, as well as the program's coverage of the Twitchell case in which two Christian Scientist parents were tried for refusing medical care for their child. A lengthy biography depicting Hart as a brooding, isolated anchor ran in The Boston Globe magazine a week and a half after, unbeknownst to his Monitor colleagues; the resignation was made public days later. He was replaced by John Palmer, former host of The Today Show, but the resignation of Hart—who was a key element in Discovery chairman John Hendricks's decision to carry the program—prompted Discovery to pull out of its six-year contract to carry World Monitor. As a result, the show began to air only on the Monitor Channel, reducing its circulation from 56 million cable homes to just 2 million; indeed, the channel's existence was another reason for the end of the Discovery partnership. Executives would later regret not acting more decisively to combine what had essentially been parallel operations at that time. With the channel's carriage still severely limited by the same structural factors of channel capacity and an uncertain regulatory environment, the Monitor Channel offered World Monitor for air to cable systems free for two years, as long as the system added the Monitor Channel to its lineup at the end of that period.

Before long, any discussion of the Monitor television operation was overshadowed by financial considerations that by now were affecting the core religious functions of the Church of Christ, Scientist. In 1958, Bliss Knapp died and left a bequest to the church on one condition: that it publish The Destiny of The Mother Church, a book written by Knapp that had been repeatedly rejected by Christian Science leaders as blasphemous for depicting Christian Science founder Mary Baker Eddy as the fulfillment of a biblical prophecy and equal to Jesus Christ, by the year 1993. In 1991, the church published the book, leading to charges that this had only been carried out to obtain the money. (Note: In 2023, the Christian Science board of directors, with the concurrence of the Board of Trustees of The Christian Science Publishing Society, removed The Destiny of The Mother Church from publication. In doing so, the board cited contradictions between the book and Mary Baker Eddy's own writings as well as restrictive conditions on the availability of the book imposed by Knapp's will. It justified the removal by noting that "several of the ideas contained in Mr. Knapp's book have led to some confusion".) A continued soft advertising market due to the deepening early 1990s recession—worst in New England, home to WQTV—and threats of legal challenges that delayed any collection of the Knapp bequest money, however, amplified the financial problems that would define 1992 for the Monitor Channel and its Boston television station.

=== Demise of the Monitor Channel and sale of WQTV ===
Like PBS at its worst, the station betrays a distaste for television, rather than an appreciation of the medium.

— Ed Siegel, television columnist, The Boston Globe

The Christian Science Church revealed in March 1992 that it had borrowed $41.5 million (equivalent to $83.1 million in 2025 dollars) in the first two months of the year to underwrite its media operations, including WQTV and the Monitor Channel; in doing so, it denied that the borrowing from its own endowment and other sources would affect the church's pension fund. By this time, the Monitor Channel was in 4 million cable homes, far short of the 25 million needed to turn a profit, and even the bequest was in doubt due to a lawsuit from the other potential beneficiaries, Stanford University and the Los Angeles County Museum of Art. The legal action prompted an immediate hiring and salary freeze in February 1992. At home, the coverage of the Globe, which generally had a negative tone toward the Monitor Channel operation, grew; in 1992, the newspaper wrote more about its woes than about the troubles engulfing Boston technology companies Digital Equipment Corporation, Wang Laboratories and the Raytheon Company combined. Monitor Channel executives released a statement, titled "Staying the Course", in which they described the Globe's "all-out assault on the television activities of The Monitor"; according to Susan Bridge, a former employee who later wrote a book on the Monitor Channel's history, this had been provoked by continuing talks for a partnership between the Monitor Channel and The Providence Journal Company.

On March 9, the church announced it had put the Monitor Channel up for sale and would shut it down by June 15 if no buyer was found for the cable service; that same day, church leader Harvey W. Wood—who had been a supporter of the media expansion—resigned as chairman. WQTV would not be affected and was declared to not be for sale. The next month, the majority of the channel's 400-person workforce was laid off, with a small staff kept on to wind down operations; the cost of shutting down the channel was quoted at $45 million (equivalent to $90.1 million in 2025 dollars). Several last-minute sale talks were held in the two months that followed, but none bore fruit.

The last task confronting the church as it wound down its once-expansive media operation was to sell the Boston television station that had fueled its boom. The church announced on May 16, citing continued fiscal pressures, that it would seek to sell WQTV. With much of the equipment used in the Monitor Channel operation being sold separately and a poor signal from the Prudential Tower, added to a competitive market with many existing stations, the station would face some difficulty in its immediate future. As the Monitor Channel shut down on June 28, WQTV continued to air archive programming from the service. Continued litigation over the $97 million bequest, promoted by the two potential California beneficiaries, led the church to auction off equipment and the Monitor Channel transponder: the latter fetched $14.2 million (equivalent to $28.4 million in 2025 dollars), being sold at a profit to the Discovery Channel, while another $4 million (equivalent to $8.01 million in 2025 dollars) was raised from the equipment.

By early May 1993, two bidders presented proposals to the church: Krypton Broadcasting Corporation, owned by Elvin Feltner, and audio electronics manufacturer Ira Gale. Gale dropped out, leaving Feltner as the sole bidder; he pledged to turn channel 68 into an all-movie station. However, the church was not able to conclude negotiations with Feltner, who was facing mounting difficulties with his stations in the Southeast. Less than two weeks after Feltner emerged as the only prospective buyer, several program distributors asked a federal bankruptcy court to force Feltner's two Florida stations, WNFT in Jacksonville and WTVX serving West Palm Beach, into Chapter 11 reorganization, and the bank that had supported the purchase of WTVX in 1988 was suing for nonpayment on a $19 million loan.

In the end, The Christian Science Monitor lost $325 million (equivalent to $650 million in 2025 dollars) in its television venture, and the Monitor Channel cost $65.9 million to shut down (equivalent to $132 million in 2025 dollars). Bridge cites three outside factors that contributed to its closure: the recession, lack of channel capacity on cable systems in an uncertain and depressed investment environment, and the association of an "internal opposition" within Christian Science with The Globe.

== Boston University ownership ==
It is rare that a television license becomes available in a major market such as Boston, and the university would be remiss if it did not take advantage of this opportunity.

— John Silber, president, Boston University

With the Krypton bid in peril, another local group entered the picture: Boston University (BU) began to analyze the possibility of buying WQTV. The deal was officially announced in June, with WQTV being sold for $3.8 million (equivalent to $7.43 million in 2025 dollars), below the church's $4.5 million asking price. After the WQTV sale, Christian Science would retain only a small production facility to continue making religious programs.

While researching WQTV, Boston University also learned of other television opportunities. Less than a month after announcing its purchase of channel 68, BU reached a deal to buy WCVX (channel 58), an inactive television station licensed to Vineyard Haven and covering Cape Cod. Later that year, BU acquired WNHT (channel 21) in Concord, New Hampshire, which had been silent since going off the air in March 1989; it would not be able to go on air from Concord until 1995 due to complaints by other New Hampshire TV stations over competition. The combination of these stations, renamed WZBU and WNBU, created a station with regional coverage only surpassed by longtime regional superstation WSBK.

BU, through commercial affiliate Boston University Communications, closed on the purchase of WQTV in November 1993. The call letters were changed to WABU as the new ownership set out to build a commercial general entertainment station. The first local programs materialized three months later: hourly newsbreaks hosted by market veterans Ted O'Brien and Gail Harris, the latter of whom had also worked at the Monitor Channel. BU's presence also augmented the 37 paid staff with some two dozen student interns earning credit for their work at channel 68. Additionally, CBS This Morning briefly joined the channel 68 lineup in early 1994 after WHDH (channel 7) stopped carrying it. This would mark the start of two years of upgrades and new local programs. Adler on Line, a nightly call-in program hosted by Canadian broadcaster Charles Adler, started in August 1994 and was followed by two Sunday programs: news review Consider This and a business program, Business World with Jim Howell. Consider This became a nightly show the next year, and a new weeknight talk show fronted by Harris also joined the primetime lineup in 1995. By the end of 1995, WABU had upgraded its original programming and acquired newer and more popular syndicated shows than it aired at launch, including Baywatch, Northern Exposure and The Golden Girls. However, ratings had largely been flat.

At the same time, WABU ramped up its sports coverage. BU hockey was soon joined by the Beanpot and other events, and by 1995, the station aired 60 collegiate games a year. However, a bigger opportunity awaited. WSBK ended its 21-year run and dropped the Boston Red Sox after the 1995 season, and after another deal the Red Sox had been making collapsed, WABU became the new home of 80 Red Sox games for 1996 on a one-year contract. The deal, however, created upheaval for Red Sox fans outside of the Boston market, as WABU and the team had to seek new coverage partners where WSBK's regional cable carriage once sufficed. In the middle of the 1996 season, a new pact was reached between the Red Sox and WABU, extending the partnership through 1998. Also in 1996, the New England Revolution in the new Major League Soccer came to channel 68, which aired 19 of 32 games in the league's first season. In 1997, 68 Sports Night debuted, hosted by John Holt.

After the Red Sox arrived on WABU, potential buyers began to make themselves known. By February 1996, Boston University had received multiple unsolicited offers for channel 68 and its satellites, prompting BU to retain an investment firm to determine the value of the properties. One reported offer came from the Meredith Corporation, which had prepared a $50 million bid for WABU. BU's indebtedness began to increase university administration's desire to sell off the television station; in 1998, the USA Broadcasting group owned by Barry Diller signed a letter of intent to purchase WABU for a reported $30 to $40 million.

In 1998, WABU struck a three-year deal to replace WSBK as the home of Boston Celtics away games. That same year was the last for the Red Sox on WABU; with the station losing $5 million (equivalent to $8.95 million in 2025 dollars) a year, the Red Sox sold their television rights to a consortium known as JCS for the 1999 season.

== Pax and Ion ownership ==
On May 4, 1999, Boston University announced that it had sold WABU and its repeaters to an affiliate of Paxson Communications Corporation, which owned the Pax TV network. While the university had rejected a string of unsolicited offers, it felt comfortable with the Pax bid because of the network's family-friendly program orientation. Pax opted not to retain the Celtics, who moved all games to Fox Sports Net New England (now NBC Sports Boston). The buyer was not Paxson directly but DP Media, owned by Bud Paxson's son Devon; Pax had launched the year before in Boston over DP Media's WBPX (channel 46) and Paxson Communications-owned WPXB (channel 60) in Merrimack, New Hampshire. The WBPX call letters moved to channel 68 along with the Pax programming months later, and WNBU and WZBU became WPXG and WDPX, respectively. Paxson acquired the DP Media stations in December 1999.

Pax operated as a national network with very little program deviation and moved to shutter the entire WABU-TV local operation, resulting in 75 layoffs at channel 68, including a local personality who would move to WFXT: Butch Stearns, who had been a sports host at the station. The 1660 Soldiers Field Road studio space was acquired by the Staples Inc. office supply chain to expand its existing location; the Brighton store had been the chain's very first in 1986 and was now small compared to its more recent builds, and Pax moved into a former Ground Round restaurant at 1120 Soldiers Field Road. After changing its name to i: Independent Television in 2005, the network became known as Ion Television in 2007.

On May 18, 2016, the Boston Herald reported that NBCUniversal was considering acquiring WBPX to serve as the market's new NBC owned-and-operated station, after announcing in January that it was pulling the affiliation off of WHDH; such a purchase never materialized, as it ultimately purchased WYCN-LD and moved its programming there under the WBTS-CD call sign on January 1, 2017.

In the FCC's incentive auction, WDPX-TV sold its spectrum for $43,467,644 (equivalent to $54.5 million in 2025 dollars) and indicated that it would enter into a post-auction channel sharing agreement. WDPX now channel-shares with WBPX-TV; as WBPX's signal does not reach Vineyard Haven, WDPX changed its city of license to Woburn.

On February 27, 2021, Qubo, Ion Plus and Ion Shop ceased broadcasting, and WBPX-TV's second and fourth subchannels switched to Ion Mystery and Bounce TV; concurrently, WDPX-TV replaced Ion Plus with Court TV. This change was as part of the acquisition of Ion by the E. W. Scripps Company, which already owned a suite of diginets. The QVC and HSN subchannels were switched on July 1 to new multicast networks from Scripps, Defy TV and TrueReal, as part of their launch in 92 percent of the United States, with the Ion transmitters as their primary carriers. The two new channels' programs combined as Defy TV in March 2023, and Defy was replaced nationwide with Ion Plus on July 1, 2024.

== Technical information and subchannels ==
WBPX-TV and WDPX-TV transmit using WBPX-TV's spectrum from a tower on Parmenter Road in Hudson, Massachusetts.

Subchannels of WBPX-TV and WDPX-TV
| License | Subchannel | Res. | Short name | Programming |
|---|---|---|---|---|
| WBPX-TV | 68.1 | 720p | ION | Ion Television |
| WBPX-TV | 68.2 | 480i | Mystery | Ion Mystery |
| WBPX-TV | 68.3 | 480i | Laff | Busted |
| WBPX-TV | 68.4 | 480i | Bounce | Bounce TV |
| WBPX-TV | 68.5 | 480i | IONPlus | Ion Plus |
| WBPX-TV | 68.6 | 480i | GameSho | Game Show Central |
| WBPX-TV | 68.8 | 480i | HSN2 | HSN2 |
| WDPX-TV | 58.1 | 720p | Grit | Grit |

WPXG-TV and WYDN transmit using WPXG-TV's spectrum from a tower on Fort Mountain near Epsom, New Hampshire.

Subchannels of WPXG-TV and WYDN
| License | Subchannel | Res. | Short name | Programming |
|---|---|---|---|---|
| WPXG-TV | 21.1 | 720p | ION | Ion Television |
| WPXG-TV | 21.2 | 480i | Mystery | Ion Mystery |
| WPXG-TV | 21.3 | 480i | Laff | Busted |
| WPXG-TV | 21.4 | 480i | Bounce | Bounce TV |
| WPXG-TV | 21.5 | 480i | IONPlus | Ion Plus |
| WPXG-TV | 21.6 | 480i | GameSho | Game Show Central |
| WPXG-TV | 21.8 | 480i | HSN2 | HSN2 |
| WYDN | 48.1 | 480i | WYDN | Daystar |

One channel on each multiplex is devoted to the channel-sharing stations: WDPX-TV (58.1 Grit) on the WBPX-TV multiplex and WYDN (48.1 Daystar) on the WPXG-TV multiplex.

=== Analog-to-digital conversion ===
WBPX-TV shut down its analog signal, over UHF channel 68 (removed from television use after the transition), on April 16, 2009. The station's digital signal continued to broadcast on its pre-transition UHF channel 32, using virtual channel 68.

=== Former translators ===
WBPX's signal was previously relayed on translator stations WMPX-LP (channel 33) in Dennis and W40BO (channel 40) in Boston. On December 15, 2014, Ion transferred WMPX-LP and W40BO to Word of God Fellowship, parent company of the Daystar network.

== See also ==
- Channel 68 virtual TV stations in the United States
- Channel 32 digital TV stations in the United States
- List of television stations in Massachusetts
- WNHT (TV) (for information on WPXG prior to 1993)

== Bibliography ==
- Bridge, Susan (1998). Monitoring the news: the brilliant launch and sudden collapse of the Monitor Channel. Armonk, N.Y.: M.E. Sharpe. ISBN 0-7656-0315-2. OCLC 38304466.
