= Boston Irish Famine Memorial =

Sculpture in Boston, Massachusetts, U.S.

- Memorial as seen from the front
- Interactive map of Boston Irish Famine Memorial
- Type: Memorial Park
- Location: Between Washington Street and School Street
- Nearest city: Boston, Massachusetts
- Coordinates: 42°21′26″N 71°03′31″W
- Created: 1998
- Visitors: 3 million visitors each year.

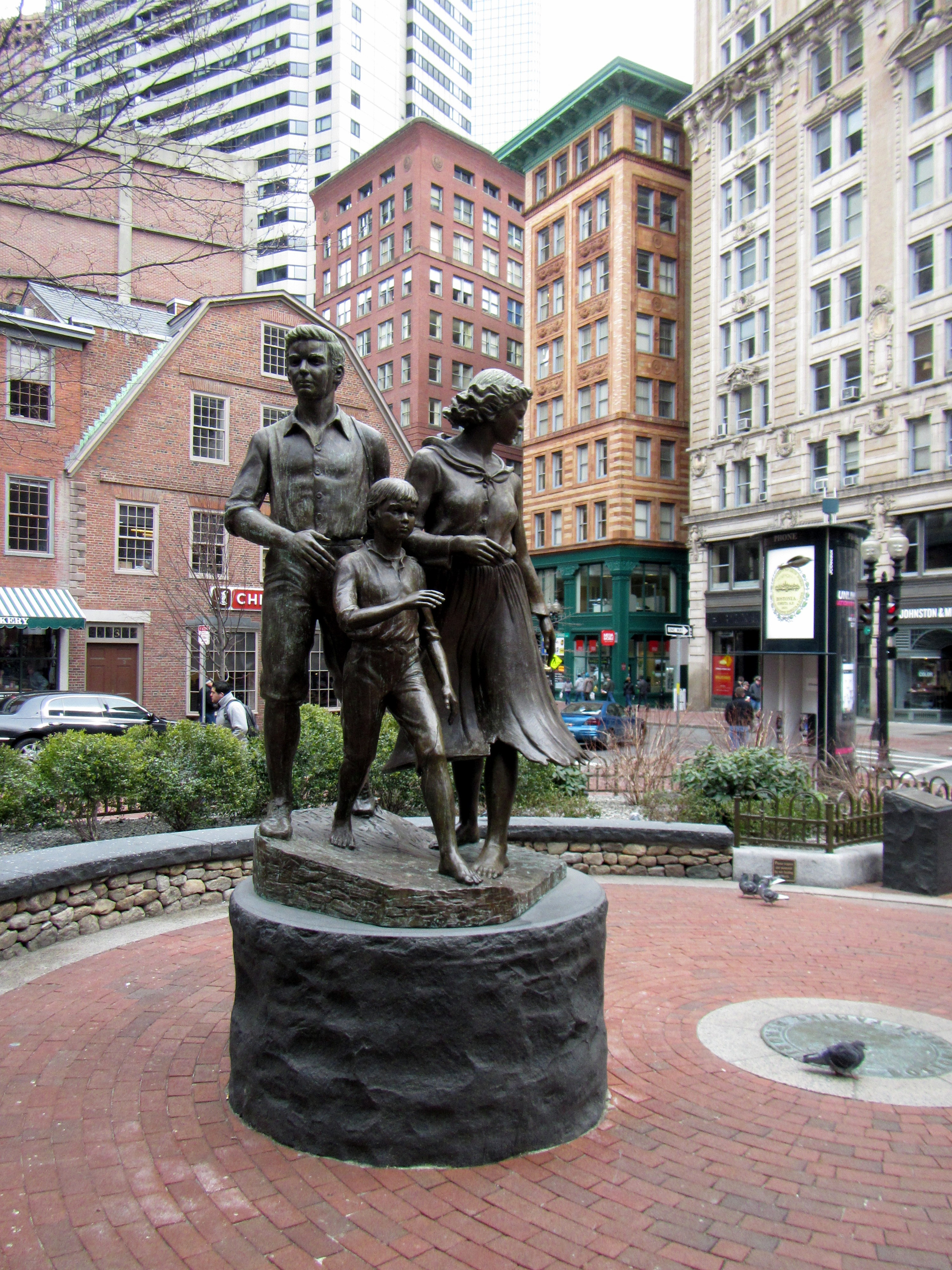
Part of the memorial in 2013

The Boston Irish Famine Memorial is a memorial park located on a plaza between Washington Street and School Street in Boston, Massachusetts. The park contains two groups of statues to contrast an Irish family suffering during the Great Famine of 1845–1852 with a prosperous family that had immigrated to America. Funded by a trust led by Boston businessman Thomas Flatley, the park was opened in 1998. It has received contrasting reviews and has since been called "the most mocked and reviled public sculpture in Boston".

== Development ==
The idea for an Irish Famine Memorial was first announced by Boston Mayor Raymond Flynn in May 1993, and the original spot was located at Faneuil Hall Marketplace. "This isn't just about Ireland, this is about human dignity, about respect," Flynn said at the announcement. When Flynn left City Hall to become U.S. ambassador to the Vatican in 1993, the project languished for a few years, until Thomas J. Flatley, an Irish-American real estate tycoon based in Boston, stepped in to revitalize it. In April, 1996, Flatley announced his intention to spearhead the project, and on May 1, convened a full committee meeting that included Irish-American officials, business leaders, historians and university presidents. The group set about soliciting design bids with the help of the Boston Arts Commission, and in April 1997, selected sculptor Robert Shure to create the Famine memorial.

The land for the memorial park was leased to the memorial trust by the Boston Redevelopment Authority in 1998. The $1 million trust was led by Flatley and was supported by Peter Lynch and others, particularly from Boston's Irish-American community.

== Description ==
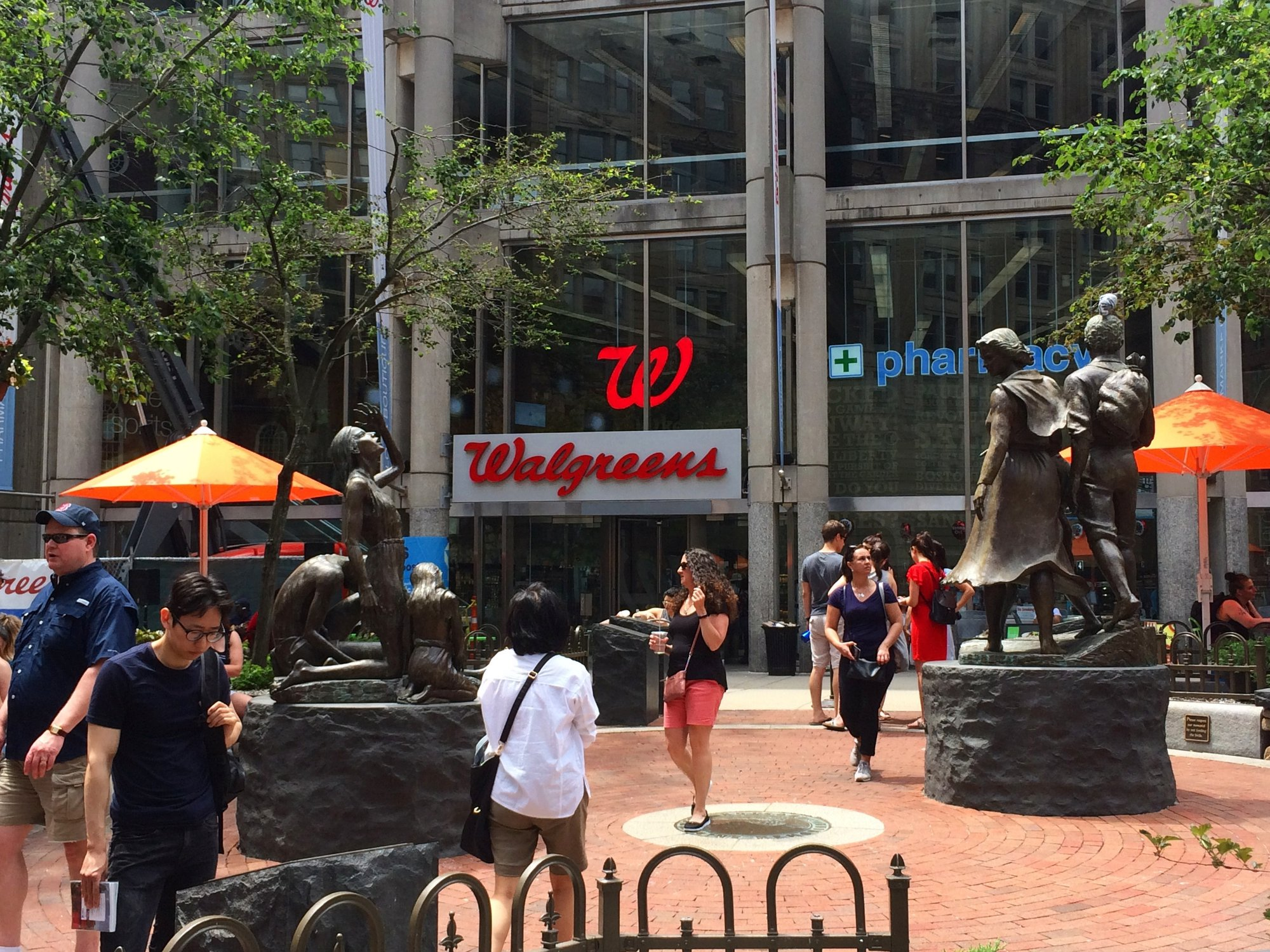
The memorial in 2018

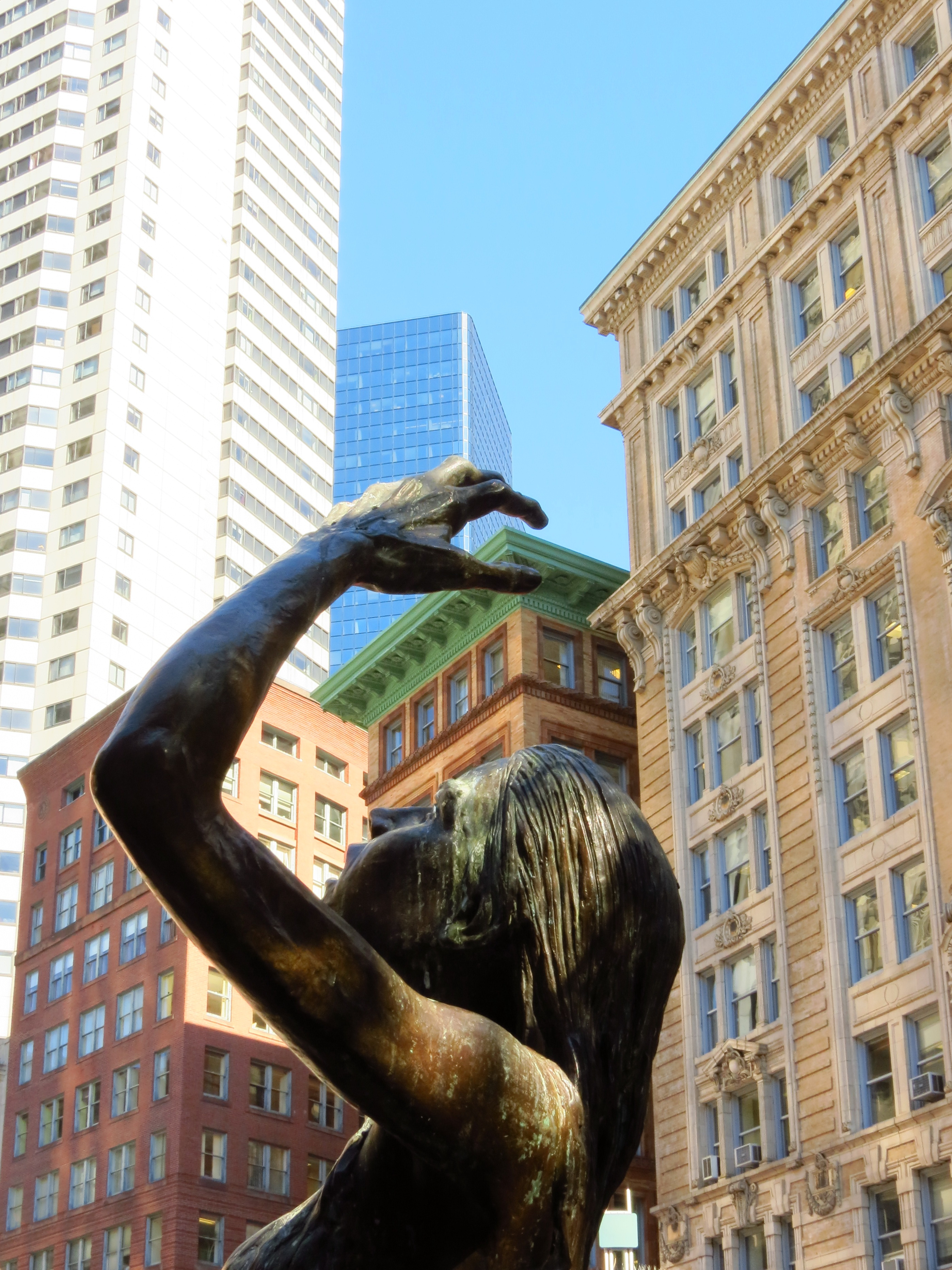
Detail, 2013

The statues are the centerpiece of the park and were sculpted by Robert Shure. The two groups represent two families, one starved and ragged owing to the deprivations of the famine, the other well-fed having found prosperity in America. It is said to emphasize the transformation from an "anxious immigrant" to a "future of freedom and opportunity" in America for the Irish, the first of a long line of immigrants to Boston and America. The sculptures are accompanied by eight narrative plaques. The memorial lies on Boston's Freedom Trail (across from the Old South Meeting House)and is visited by more than 3 million people per year.

== History ==
The statues and park were unveiled on June 28, 1998, to mark 150 years since the height of the Great Famine, in a ceremony attended by 7,000 people.

Although the memorial won immediate praise by those who visited, the statues were criticized by Fintan O'Toole of the Irish Times who said they represented "pious cliches and dead conventions". In 2013, Sebastian Smee, art critic for The Boston Globe, called it "the most mocked and reviled public sculpture in Boston". Others have decried the monument as a commemoration of the accomplishments of Irish Americans rather than a memorial to the Famine.

In response to the criticism, Boston Irish Reporter columnist Bill O'Donnell wrote, "Once again we learn that they (writers, journalists, et al.) don’t like the memorial. The latest of the naysayers is the Boston Globe’s Pulitzer Prize-winning art critic, Sebastian Smee. Before Smee’s recent harsh words there was Fintan O’Toole of the Irish Times. After too long a wait, we have a lasting memorial that recognizes history’s truth and tells its poignant story to some three million viewers each year. What’s the problem?”

When the Memorial was unveiled in 1998, the committee established a Maintenance Fund to keep the park clean year round. The Downtown Boston Business Improvement District and a nearby Walgreens pharmacy help with cleaning the park area, but the site was described in 2013 as a "magnet for vagrants and pigeons".

The memorial was the site of a July 2014 rally in support of the sheltering of immigrant children in Boston. It was also the site, in January 2017, of a protest against a crackdown on illegal immigrants.

In spring 2023, as the 25th Anniversary of the Boston Irish Famine Memorial approached, the Flatley Company and Boston Irish Famine Memorial Trust undertook restoration work on the twin bronze sculptures and eight narrative plaques, along with upgrades to the grounds, fencing, benches and landscaping in the park. An event took place on June 28, 2023, to mark the 25th anniversary of the memorial.

== See also ==
- List of memorials to the Great Famine
- The Irish Famine Memorial is part of the Irish Heritage Trail.
- History of Irish Americans in Boston
