= The Silk Road (Japanese TV series) =

Japanese documentary television program

The Silk Road (NHK特集 シルクロード) is a documentary television series produced by the Japan Broadcasting Corporation (NHK) that was first broadcast during the 1980s. The travelogue traced the ancient Silk Road from Chang'an (modern day Xi'an) to Rome covering the history, archaeology, culture, religion, and art of countries along the route.

The series first aired in Japan on 7 April 1980, with sequels being broadcast over a 10-year period. It took a total of 17 years from conception to complete what many considered a landmark in Japan's broadcast television history. The intention of the program was to reveal how ancient Japan was influenced by the exchange of goods and ideas along the trade route.

== Background ==
In September 1972, an NHK director covered Japanese Prime Minister Tanaka Kakuei's visit to Beijing, China. During the visit, Chinese Premier Zhou Enlai invited journalists and reporters for their support in introducing China to the rest of the world, which signalled the thaw of post-war Sino-Japanese relations. The director proposed the Silk Road could be the subject of a TV program to illustrate cultural exchange between China and the rest of the world. The executives of NHK supported this idea, but by mid-1970s the camera crew had not been able to enter the Silk Road region due to the Cultural Revolution in China. A breakthrough came after various negotiations by the end of October 1978, with Deputy Premier Deng Xiaoping's visit to Japan. At the end of 1978, permission was granted and a joint project with China Central Television (CCTV) was created.

It was the first time a foreign television crew had been granted entry into the Silk Road region within Chinese territory since the beginning of the reform and opening up. The historic documentary also reflected international tension in the Central and Western Asia regions at the time, which would lead to the Soviet–Afghan War and Iran–Iraq War.

Since the program was first broadcast in the 1980s, several archaeological sites visited in the series have been destroyed by natural disasters or by Islamic State extremists.

== Production ==
The first series was jointly produced with China's CCTV, and filming began in September 1979. The 12-part series covers segments of the Silk Road within the People's Republic of China from Xi'an up to the Chinese borders with Pakistan and the former Soviet Union.

The second series covers segments of the Silk Road outside China, in the Indian subcontinent, Central and Western Asia, Caucasus, Anatolia, until the crew reached Rome, Italy. The 18-part series was broadcast between April 1983 and September 1984.

While the series makes frequent references to early Western explorers of the early 20th century like Sven Hedin, Aurel Stein and Pyotr Kozlov, as well as the legendary travels of Xuanzang, contemporary Orientalists such as Inoue Yasushi, Ryōtarō Shiba, Chin Shunshin and Kato Kiyoshi participated in the series and provided expert consultation who also later published their own travelogues.

The original Japanese version was narrated by Kôji Ishizaka. The initial English version was narrated by Australian actor and presenter Graham Webster (first series only). A second English version, aired on The Monitor Channel in the U.S. in 1991, was narrated by journalist Takashi Oka.

== Episodes ==
=== Season 1 (1980-1981) ===
No.	Title	Original release date
1	"Glories of Ancient Chang-an"	April 7, 1980
2	"A Thousand Kilometers Beyond the Yellow River"	May 5, 1980
3	"The Art Gallery in the Desert"	June 2, 1980
4	"The Dark Castle"	July 7, 1980
5	"In Search of the Kingdom of Lou-Lan"	August 4, 1980
6	"Across the Taklamakan Desert"	September 1, 1980
7	"Khotan — Oasis of Silk and Jade"	October 6, 1980
8	"A Heat Wave Called Turfan"	November 3, 1980
9	"Through the Tian Shan Mountains by Rail"	December 1, 1980
10	"Journey into Music -- South Through the Tian Shan Mountains"	January 5, 1981
11	"Where Horses Fly Like the Wind"	February 2, 1981
12	"Two Roads to the Pamirs"	March 2, 1981

=== Season 2 (1983-1984) ===
No.	Title	Original release date
1	"Across the Pamirs"	April 4, 1983
2	"The Kings Road"	May 2, 1983
3	"Legendary Ladakh"	June 6, 1983
4	"The Travels of Xuang Zang in India"	July 4, 1983
5	"The Scorching Sun and the Southern Road of Iran"	August 1, 1983
6	"The Desert: In Search of Wisdom"	September 5, 1983
7	"Beyond Baghdad"	October 3, 1983
8	"The Road Vanished into a Lake"	November 7, 1983
9	"Across the Steppes"	December 5, 1983
10	"The Sky Horses of Davan"	January 9, 1984
11	"The Soghdian Merchants"	February 6, 1984
12	"The Glory of Samarkand"	March 5, 1984
13	"Across the Karakum Desert"	April 2, 1984
14	"The Other Silk Road"	May 7, 1984
15	"The Caravans Move West"	June 4, 1984
16	"The Horsemen of Turkey"	July 2, 1984
17	"The Silk City at the Edge of Asia"	August 20, 1984
18	"All Roads Lead to Rome"	September 3, 1984

== Accolades ==
On average, The Silk Road was watched by about 20% of the viewing audience. In response to viewers' requests that the series be extended to cover the Silk Road all the way to Rome, sequels were made over the next 10 years. The series was broadcast in 38 countries in Asia and Europe.

Writer Ryōtarō Shiba described The Silk Road series as "the most fruitful Sino-Japanese cultural exchange in postwar history."

The popularity of the series launched the career of Kitaro who produced the theme and background music. Kitaro was awarded at the 18th Galaxy Awards for his work with the series.

== Spin-off ==
In 2005, in commemoration of NHK's 80th anniversary, CCTV and NHK jointly produced for the second time a Silk Road documentary. The 10-part series, according to the general director, takes a new approach to the subject, as it reveals many of the archaeological discoveries and relics that have not been disclosed to the public in previous documentaries. The footage was edited into separate Chinese and Japanese versions. Known as The New Silk Road, the Chinese language series was first aired on 10 March 2006.

== Related books and media ==
As part of NHK's 80th anniversary in 2005, the footage was digitally remastered, and broadcast in conjunction with NHK's "New Silk Road" special. DVD set with remastered version is also being sold.

English dub was released and distributed by Central Park Media on VHS in 1990. A digitally remastered DVD set was released in 2005.

Eighteen books were published on the making of The Silk Road and 3 million copies were sold. A 10-volume photo series sold 660,000 copies, and 380,000 videos, too, were sold. Seven million records and CDs of the soundtrack have been sold in Japan and abroad.
