= Thomas Flatley =

American businessman

- Born: August 30, 1931; Kiltimagh County Mayo, Ireland
- Died: May 17, 2008 (aged 76)
- Known for: Real estate development
- Spouse: Charlotte McLeod (m. 1956)
- Children: 5

Thomas J. Flatley (August 30, 1931 - May 17, 2008) was an Irish–American billionaire and philanthropist engaged in real estate development.

== Early life ==
Flatley was born on August 30, 1931, in Kiltimagh County Mayo, Ireland and grew up on a 25-acre farm. In 1950, he immigrated to New York City with only $32.

He worked at a Bronx delicatessen, served in the army for 2 years and then moved to Boston, enrolling at Wentworth Institute of Technology on the G.I. Bill. He dropped out, and in 1956, he started a plumbing and air conditioning business. In 1958, he developed his first apartment complex.

In 1972, he formed Democrats for Nixon along with John Connally.

Between 1984 and when he shut it down in 1989, Flatley owned WNHT, a television station in New Hampshire; he also owned WSYT in Syracuse, New York.

By 1996, he owned and operated 12 malls and shopping centers, 56 office buildings, 15 hotels, 7 nursing homes and 14 apartment complexes with 6,000 units. His developments included the Sheraton Tara Hotel in Braintree, Massachusetts, built based on the design of Irish castles, and the Quincy Marriott.

In 1997, he sold 2 hotels on Cape Cod for $29 million.

In 1998, Flatley funded construction of the Boston Irish Famine Memorial.

In 1999, he sold 3 nursing homes for $33 million.

In 2002, he sold 11 properties to Aimco for $500 million.

In March 2007, Flatley was ranked 754th by Forbes on the list of the world's billionaires.

In May 2007, Flately sold his 10 shopping centers for $500 million.

In 2008, Flatley died of amyotrophic lateral sclerosis.

== Personal life ==
Flatley lived in Milton, Massachusetts. He attended mass every morning at St. Agatha's Church, lived in a modest home, and usually flew coach.

He established a foundation with $200 million. Flatley gave millions to Catholic Charities USA, Boston College, Africa relief, and Irish causes.
