= Luix Overbea =

American journalist (1923–2010)

Luix Virgil Overbea
- Born: February 15, 1923; Chicago, Illinois, U.S.
- Died: July 10, 2010 (age 87); Boston, Massachusetts, U.S.
- Education: Northwestern University
- Occupation: Journalist
- Years active: 1955–1992

Luix Virgil Overbea (February 15, 1923 – July 10, 2010) was an American journalist who was one of the founding members of the National Association of Black Journalists (NABJ).

== Biography ==
Luix Overbea was a native of Chicago; and received a bachelor's degree in philosophy in journalism from Northwestern University. He moved to North Carolina to work for the Winston-Salem Journal from 1955 to 1968, where he was the only Black reporter. He did not want to be confined to just covering "black news" and covered everything from professional and social events to sports; during that period however, white townspeople were insulted when he would show up to cover things like aldermen's meetings, and let him know. Overbea was one of the first people to interview the young Jesse Jackson in 1964 as Jackson led lunch-counter sit-ins at North Carolina A&T University.

In the 1960s, Overbea worked as editor of the Black-owned St. Louis Sentinel and then for the Globe-Democrat. In 1971, he went to work for the Christian Science Monitor, where he stayed for 21 years. In his role at the Monitor, he served as a writer and TV show host for the Monitor's TV channel, a newspaper reporter, and was the vice president for community relations for the Monitor's broadcast operations. He was noted for his coverage of the Boston school desegregation in the 1970s. He was also a contributor to the Boston Globe, the Bay State Banner, and other papers.

Overbea worked to help other Black journalists find their way in the business. He was one of the founders of the National Association of Black Journalists. and in 1993 received a Lifetime Achievement Award from that organization.

Overbea retired in 1992. He died on July 10, 2010, in Boston at 87 years of age. Upon his death, NABJ President Kathy Y. Times said that "without leaders like Luix Overbea there would be no NABJ. He truly paved the way for many black journalists to follow in his footsteps." Overbea's funeral took place on July 16, and he was buried in Mount Hope Cemetery, Boston.

== Personal life ==
Overbea was married to Elexie (Culp) Overbea and had one daughter, named Adgirene. He was noted for his sense of humor, and for being "free of bitterness" from the discrimination faced early in his career.

In addition to his journalism work, Overbea was an artist and poet. His poem "Hometown" was engraved on a monument at the Roxbury Crossing Boston Orange line train stop.

== Selected works ==
- Poets on the horizon : a collection of poetry (1988)
