= The Destiny of The Mother Church =

Book by Bliss Knapp

The Destiny of the Mother Church
- 1991 edition
- Author: Bliss Knapp
- Language: English
- Published: 1991
- Publication place: United States
- Media type: Print

The Destiny of The Mother Church is a book about Christian Science written by Bliss Knapp, published privately by him in 1947, and publicly in 1991 by Christian Science Publishing Society. Knapp and his parents, Ira O. and Flavia Stickney Knapp, all knew Christian Science founder Mary Baker Eddy. His parents were students of hers and his father was one of the original members of the Board of Directors of The First Church of Christ, Scientist ("The Mother Church"). Until 1991, the book was repeatedly rejected for publication by the church's Board of Directors because of its depiction of Eddy as the fulfillment of biblical prophecy and equating her with Jesus, a position which Eddy considered blasphemous. Destiny's publication caused divisions within the church, including several resignations of prominent church employees. Critics claimed that the failure of the church's then-recent television venture, which had cost the church several hundred million dollars, had motivated the Board's reversal on publishing Knapp's book. Knapp, his wife and her sister left wills that granted bequests totalling over $100 million (in 1990s dollars) promised to the church if the book were to be published. The wills set a time limit of 20 years for the book to be published, otherwise the bequests were to be divided between Stanford University and the Los Angeles County Museum of Art, and the church would receive nothing. The 1973 death of Knapp's wife set the date of the time limit to May 1993.

== Controversy ==
Both of Bliss Knapp's parents were students of Eddy, and Ira O. Knapp was one of her students who believed her to be the "woman of prophecy", a view also held by his son. In 1925, the younger Knapp wrote a book about his parents, which he later expanded to include chapters on his view of Eddy's identity as the "woman clothed with the sun" described in Revelation 12:1. Eddy herself taught that the woman "symbolizes generic man, the spiritual idea of God". (Note: Eddy uses the word "man" in the older sense of "species" or "human being", it does not refer to gender.) She strongly rejected any comparison to Jesus. Nonetheless, her own difficulties establishing a new religion did make her identify with the apocalyptic woman's "travailing in birth", the dragon's persecution of the woman and other symbolism in the chapter.

Knapp published Destiny privately in 1947 and sent a book draft of Destiny to the Christian Science Board of Directors requesting that the church publish it as authorized literature. In a six-page reply in February 1948, they cited numerous points they regarded as departures from Eddy's teaching and said they could not publish the book without those points being corrected. Knapp did not revise the book as they proposed, but left a trust with approximately $100 million in 1990s dollars to revert to the Christian Science church if it published his work as "authorized literature", an official designation that identifies a work as being in consonance with Christian Science teaching. The trust set up a 20-year time limitation; with the death of Knapp's wife in 1973, that date became May 1993.

In September 1991, the Christian Science Board of Directors decided to publish The Destiny of The Mother Church, despite charges of blasphemy and protests that doing so violated the Manual of The Mother Church, which governs the church, including its publishing arm. It created a 15-book series of biographies of Eddy, the first time the church had published anything new about her in years.

A church spokesman defended the decision to publish saying that, since Knapp had known Eddy personally, his book was historically valuable and the decision had nothing to do with the bequest. The church treasurer, however, told the Philadelphia Inquirer that the church's board of directors would have been "fiscally irresponsible" not to have discussed publishing Destiny. The church had lost substantial sums of money in its television venture, begun in 1986, reallocating funds from its newspaper, The Christian Science Monitor, to the extent that its editor, Kay Fanning and others resigned in protest, then borrowing $41.5 million from its pension fund, $20 million from a restricted endowment fund and another $5 million from money left to the church by Eddy. In 1992, the church estimated it had lost $327.5 million. In addition, membership had been in decline, reducing income.

The third printing of the book was marked "authorized literature". In 1992, at the annual meeting of church members held in Boston, Al M. Carnesciali, manager of the Publishing Society, spoke of "Christian Science literature" as opposed to "authorized literature", a term which signified that which the church endorsed as being consonant with official church teachings. Carnesciali made a distinction between "Christian Science literature" consonant with official church teachings and "authorized literature", which did not have to be doctrinally "correct". Additionally, the Publishing Society announced that it considered "books" to be a separate category from "literature," and that although Destiny was not considered "literature," it qualified as a "book" as well as "authorized literature."

In order to fulfill the terms of the trust, the book was to be designated "authorized literature" and prominently displayed in "substantially all" Christian Science reading rooms. The Knapp estate reached a compromise with the church in October 1993, allowing the church to publish the book without declaring it "authorized literature" and split the bequest with the other two beneficiaries. This was challenged by a Knapp family member who said Bliss Knapp had stipulated there be full compliance with the trust. In addition, a group of church members sought the court to prevent distribution based on the Manual by-law prohibiting the church from publishing "incorrect literature." In addition, many reading rooms refused to carry the book, though precise figures are difficult to establish.

The court challenges failed and the money was eventually distributed three ways, with the church getting 53% and Stanford University and the Los Angeles County Art Museum splitting the rest.

== Church Board withdraws support in 2023 ==
Acknowledging their earlier mistake, the Christian Science Board of Directors, with the concurrence of the Trustees of the Christian Science Publishing Society, withdrew the book from publication in September 2023. In a message published in The Christian Science Journal, the board of directors acknowledged the difficulty of adhering to some of the requirements of Knapp's bequest and noted that some of the ideas in the book had caused "confusion". However, none of the funds accepted by the Church have been returned to the original donors nor redirected to Stanford and the Los Angeles County Museum of Art.
