= Church of Christ, Scientist =

Christian Science denomination

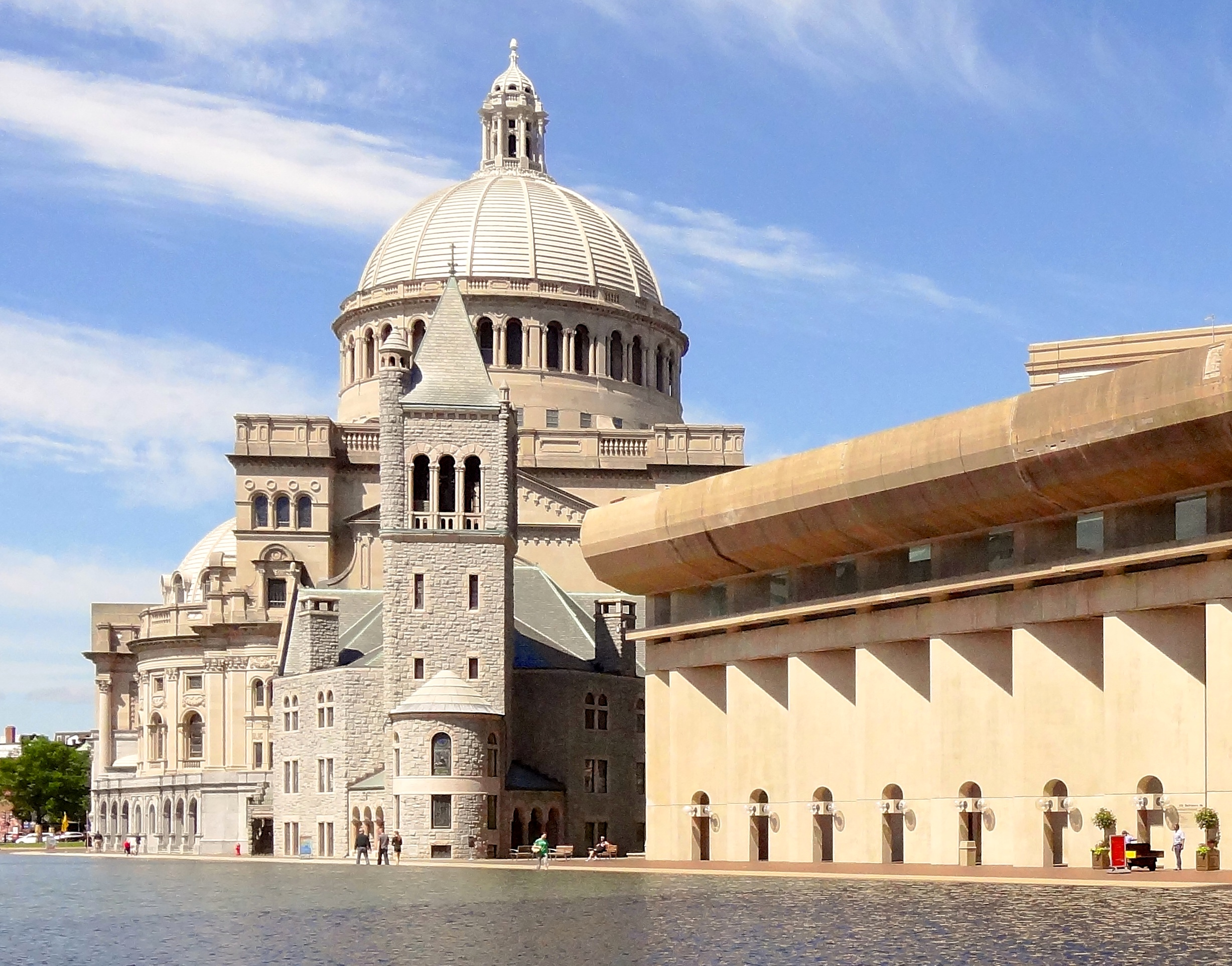
- The First Church of Christ, Scientist in Boston, the church's administrative headquarters
- Classification: Christian new religious movement Restorationist
- Orientation: Nontrinitarianism
- Scripture: Science and Health with Key to the Scriptures and Bible
- Region: United States
- Founder: Mary Baker Eddy
- Origin: 1879; 147 years ago Boston, Massachusetts, U.S.
- Congregations: approximately 1,750 worldwide (1,153 in US as of 2010)
- Members: estimates range from under 100,000 to around 400,000.

The Church of Christ, Scientist is a Christian new religious movement founded in 1879 in Boston, Massachusetts, by Mary Baker Eddy, the author of Science and Health with Key to the Scriptures and founder of Christian Science. According to Eddy, the church was founded "to commemorate the word and works of Christ Jesus" and "reinstate primitive Christianity and its lost element of healing". The church is known for shunning medical treatment in favor of prayer.

In the early decades of the 20th century, Christian Science churches were founded in communities around the world. During the final decades of that century, there was a marked decline in membership, except in Africa, where there has been growth. Headquartered in Boston, the church does not officially report membership, and estimates as to worldwide membership range from under 100,000 to about 400,000. In 2010, there were 1,153 churches in the United States.

== History ==
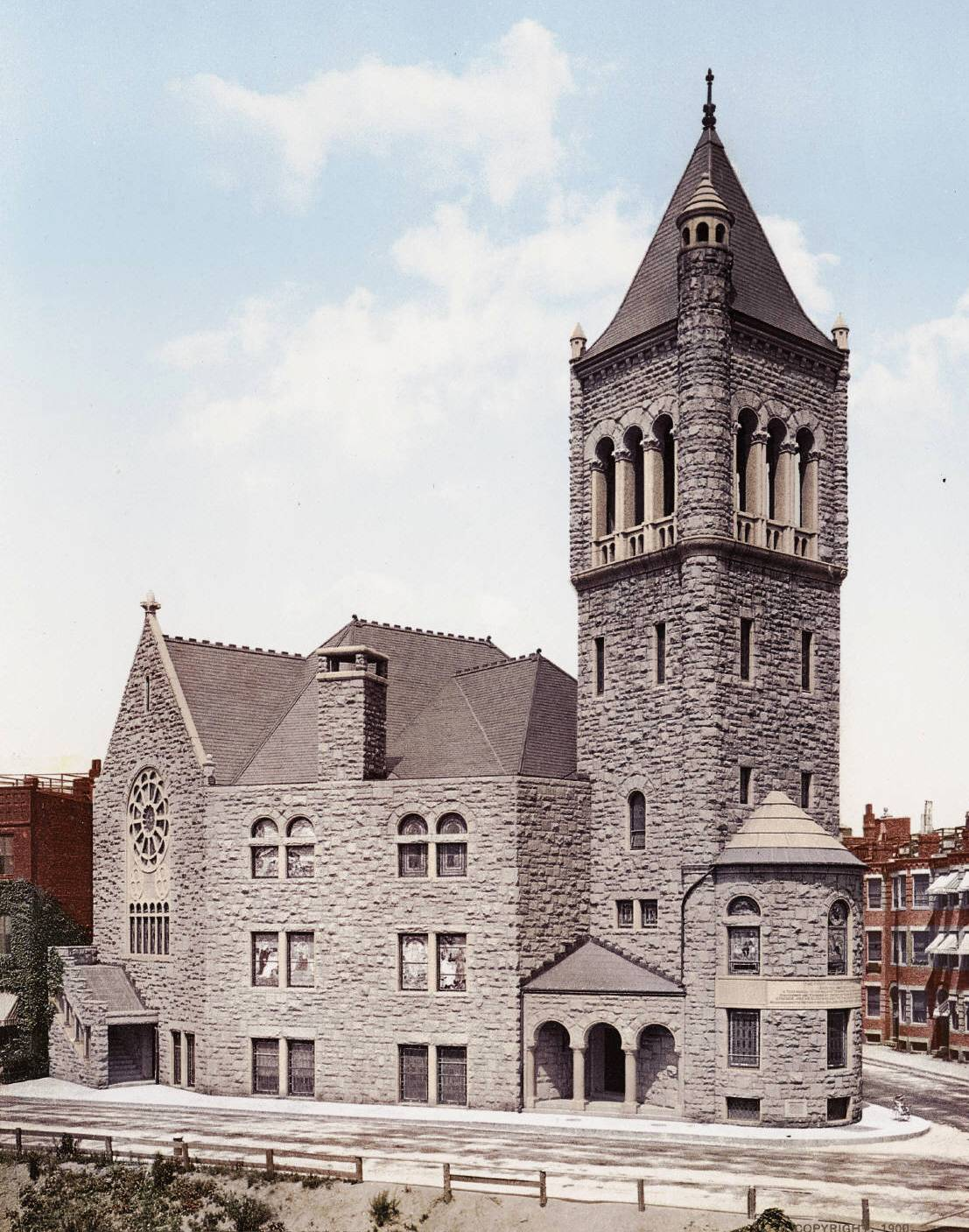
The church building, Huntington Ave., Boston, 1900

The church was incorporated by Mary Baker Eddy in 1879, following a claimed personal healing in 1866, which she said resulted from reading the Bible. The Bible and Eddy's textbook on Christian healing, Science and Health with Key to the Scriptures, are together the church's key doctrinal sources and have been ordained as the church's "dual impersonal pastor".

The First Church of Christ, Scientist publishes the weekly newspaper The Christian Science Monitor in print and online.

=== Broadcasting ===
Beginning in the mid-1980s, church executives undertook a controversial and ambitious foray into electronic broadcast media. The first significant effort was to create a weekly half-hour syndicated television program, The Christian Science Monitor Reports. "Monitor Reports" was anchored in its first season by newspaper veteran Rob Nelson. He was replaced in the second by the Christian Science Monitor's former Moscow correspondent, David Willis.

In October 1991, Christian Science Monitor anchor John Hart, who is not a Christian Scientist, resigned following professional disputes with the Monitor regarding Christian Science teachings and his journalistic independence.

The hundreds of millions lost on broadcasting brought the church to the brink of bankruptcy. However, with the 1991 publication of The Destiny of The Mother Church by the late Bliss Knapp, the church secured a $90 million bequest from the Knapp trust. The trust dictated that the book be published as "Authorized Literature", with neither modification nor comment. Historically, the church had censured Knapp for deviating at several points from Eddy's teaching, and had refused to publish the work. The church's archivist, fired in anticipation of the book's publication, wrote to branch churches to inform them of the book's history. Many Christian Scientists thought the book violated the church's by-laws, and the editors of the church's religious periodicals and several other church employees resigned in protest. Alternate beneficiaries subsequently sued to contest the church's claim it had complied fully with the will's terms, and the church ultimately received only half of the original sum.

The fallout of the broadcasting debacle also sparked a minor revolt among some prominent church members. In late 1993, a group of Christian Scientists filed suit against the Board of Directors, alleging a willful disregard for the Manual of The Mother Church in its financial dealings. The suit was thrown out by the Supreme Judicial Court of Massachusetts in 1997, but a lingering discontent with the church's financial matters persisted as of 2011. The Destiny of The Mother Church ceased publication in September 2023.

=== Membership decline and financial setbacks ===
In spite of its early meteoric rise, church membership has declined over the past eight decades, according to the church's former treasurer, J. Edward Odegaard. Though the Church is prohibited by the Manual from publishing membership figures, the number of branch churches in the United States has fallen steadily since World War II. In 2009, for the first time in church history, more new members came from Africa than the United States.

In 2005, The Boston Globe reported that the church was considering consolidating Boston operations into fewer buildings and leasing out space in buildings it owned. Church official Philip G. Davis noted that the administration and Colonnade buildings had not been fully used for many years and that vacancy increased after staff reductions in 2004. The church posted an $8 million financial loss in fiscal 2003, and in 2004 cut 125 jobs, a quarter of the staff, at the Christian Science Monitor. Conversely, Davis noted that "the financial situation right now is excellent" and stated that the church was not facing financial problems.

== Beliefs and practices ==
Christian Scientists believe that prayer is effective for healing diseases. The Church has collected over 50,000 testimonies of incidents that it considers healing through Christian Science treatment alone. While most of these testimonies represent ailments neither diagnosed nor treated by medical professionals, the Church requires three other people to vouch for any testimony published in any of its official organs, including the Christian Science Journal, Christian Science Sentinel, and Herald of Christian Science; verifiers say that they witnessed the healing or know the testifier well enough to vouch for them.

A Christian Science practitioner is someone who devotes their full time to prayer for others, but they do not use drugs or make medical diagnoses. Christian Scientists may take an intensive two-week "Primary" class from an authorized Christian Science teacher. Those who wish to become "Journal-listed" (accredited) practitioners, devoting themselves full-time to the practice of healing, must first have Primary class instruction. When they have what the church regards as a record of healing, they may submit their names for publication in the directory of practitioners and teachers in the Christian Science Journal. A practitioner who has been listed for at least three years may apply for "Normal" class instruction, given once every three years. Those who receive a certificate are authorized to teach.

According to the church, both Primary and Normal classes are based on the Bible and the writings of Mary Baker Eddy. The Primary class focuses on the chapter "Recapitulation" in Science and Health with Key to the Scriptures. This chapter uses the Socratic method of teaching and contains the "Scientific Statement of Being". The "Normal" class focuses on the platform of Christian Science, contained on pages 330-340 of Science and Health.

== Organization ==
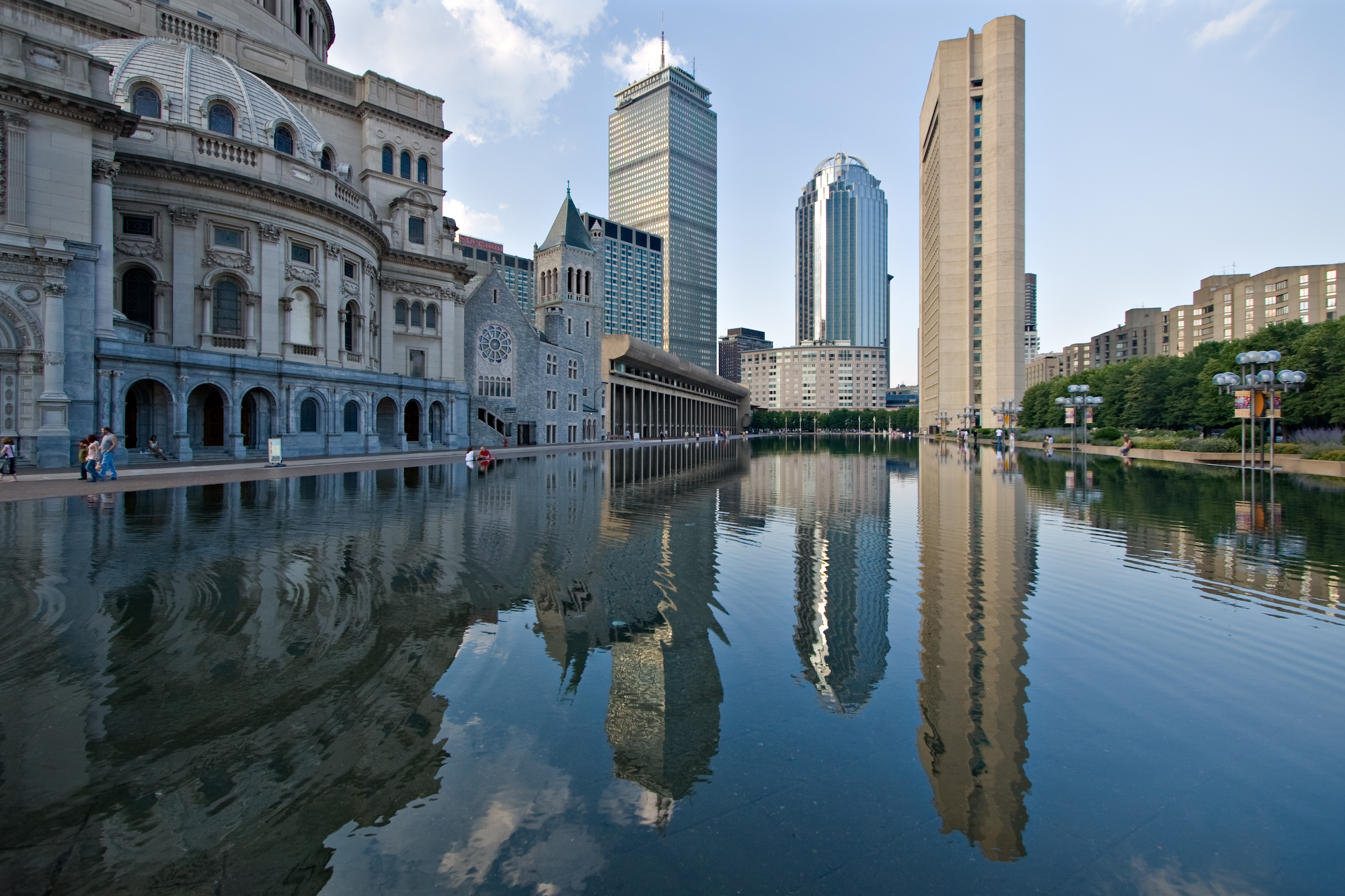
Reflecting pool of the headquarters of the Church of Christ, Scientist. The Prudential Tower, 177 Huntington Avenue, and 111 Huntington Avenue are in the background.

The First Church of Christ, Scientist is the legal title of The Mother Church and administrative headquarters of the Christian Science Church. The Mary Baker Eddy Library for the Betterment of Humanity is housed in an 11-story structure originally built for The Christian Science Publishing Society.

An international newspaper, The Christian Science Monitor, founded by Eddy in 1908 and winner of seven Pulitzer Prizes, is published by the church through the Christian Science Publishing Society.

=== Board of directors ===
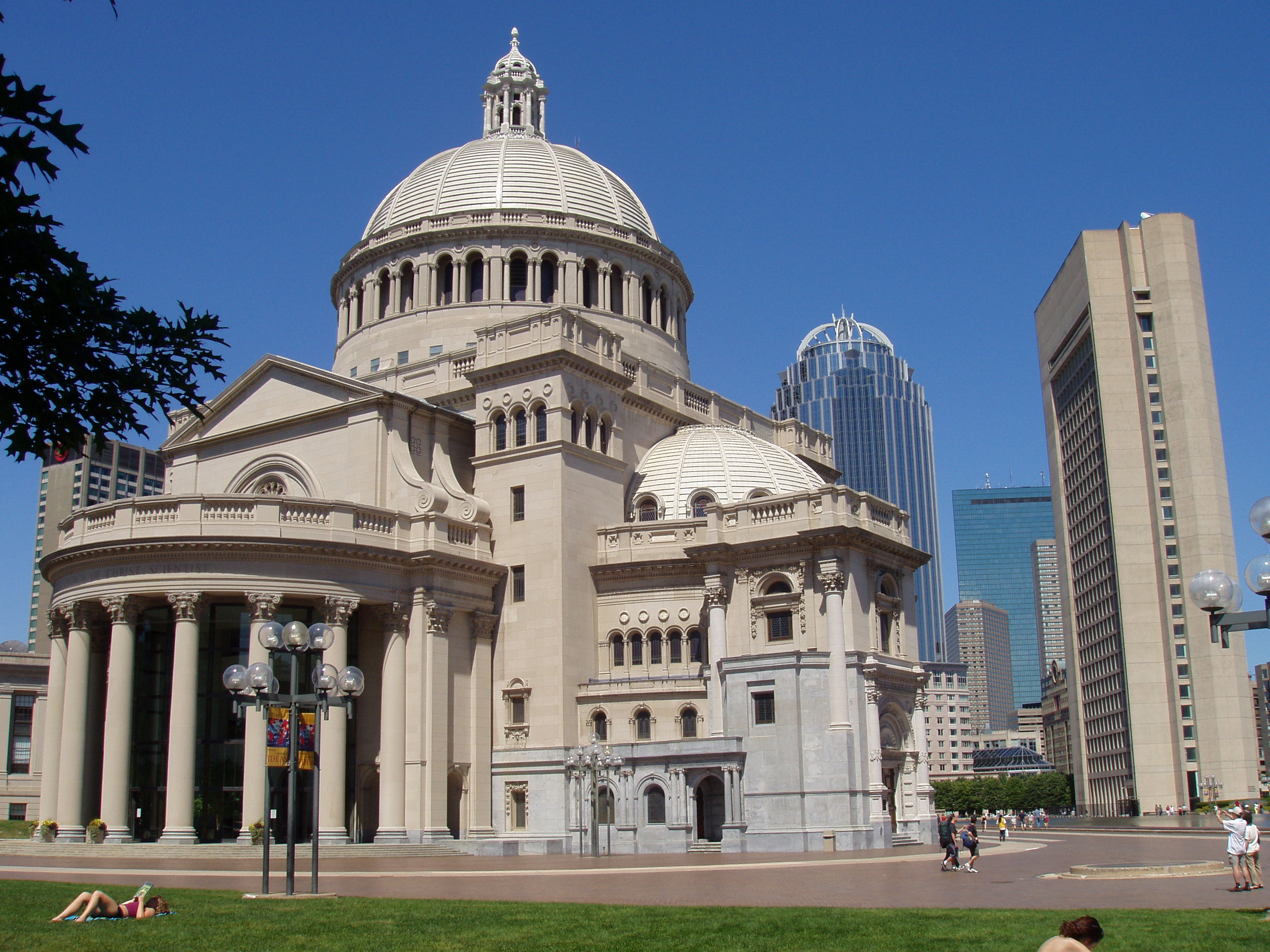
The First Church of Christ, Scientist is the Mother Church and administrative headquarters of the Christian Science Church.

The Christian Science Board of Directors is a five-person executive entity created by Mary Baker Eddy to conduct the business of the Christian Science Church under the terms defined in the by-laws of the Church Manual. Its functions and restrictions are defined by the Manual.

== Criticism ==
=== Use of spiritual healing in place of medical treatment ===
The use of prayer, often in place of medical treatment, has been an area of controversy since the founding of the church; and the legality of practicing Christian Science was raised as early as 1887, when some Christian Science practitioners were charged with practicing medicine without a license. Avoidance of medical care is not a doctrinal obligation and is considered a personal choice. However, during the 1980s and 1990s in the United States, a number of Christian Scientist parents whose children died from lack of access to medical treatment were the subject of considerable controversy and were charged with manslaughter or even murder, but the outcomes of the cases were inconsistent. The lack of consensus regarding medical care is reflected in the laws of various U.S. states, which have also been inconsistent regarding religious exemptions from medical care.

== See also ==
- Christian Science Reading Room
- Commonwealth v. Twitchell
- Jewish Science
- List of Christian Scientists (religious denomination)
- List of Former Christian Science Churches, Societies and Buildings
- Principia College, a college for Christian Scientists in Elsah, Illinois
- Reader (Christian Science Church)
