= WNHT (TV) =

Television station in Concord, New Hampshire (1984–1989)

- Concord–Manchester, New Hampshire; United States
- City: Concord, New Hampshire
- Channels: Analog: 21 (UHF)

Programming
- Affiliations: Independent (1984–1988); CBS (1988–1989)

Ownership
- Owner: The Flatley Company

History
- First air date: April 16, 1984
- Last air date: March 31, 1989
- Call sign meaning: "We're New Hampshire Television"

Technical information
- ERP: 1,845 kW
- HAAT: 345 m (1,133 ft)
- Transmitter coordinates: 43°11′14″N 71°19′11.5″W

WNHT (channel 21) was a television station in Concord, New Hampshire, United States. Owned for most of its existence by The Flatley Company, the organization of real estate developer Thomas Flatley, it broadcast from 1984 to 1989, first as an independent station and in its final year as a CBS affiliate with a full news department. The station's failure to attract New Hampshire news and CBS viewers, combined with a weakening advertising market, led to its closure on March 31, 1989; the station would not be reactivated until 1995 when it reemerged as WNBU, a satellite of Boston's WABU.

== Construction and launch ==
In 1980, the Federal Communications Commission (FCC) received two applications to build a new television station in Concord. One was made by Leon Crosby, who owned KEMO-TV in San Francisco and had filed for three other stations across the country; his lawyer, Lauren Colby, described the proposal as for a "relatively low-powered, relatively modest community-oriented operation". The other came from NH Channel 21 Limited Partnership, which consisted of five New Hampshire businessmen, four of them with no major broadcast holdings. However, it made up for that in political power: one of the five partners was Hugh Gregg, a former governor of New Hampshire, who had been thinking about filing for a station for some time but was spurred into action by the Crosby application, wanting to see the new outlet owned by local interests.

Somebody is going to spend $3 million or $4 million for a new station and go bust. I don't intend for it to be us.

— William Smith, president of competing WNDS

The FCC granted the NH Channel 21 application on April 15, 1981, after Crosby opted to pull out, and the company announced work would start on building the transmitter on Fort Mountain near Epsom. However, by 1983, the Gregg consortium had abandoned its plans and sold the construction permit to NHTV 21 Inc., owned by Bob and Frances Shaine and John S. Gikas, in a deal filed with the FCC the next year. Frances Shaine published a magazine, New Hampshire Profiles, and owned a manufacturing company in Holyoke, Massachusetts. After opposition dissuaded the station from setting up shop in the city's South End, a site on Hall Street was identified and approved to construct a studio. However, delays in obtaining equipment prevented NHTV 21 from meeting its goal to be on the air in time for the New Hampshire presidential primary.

Channel 21 began broadcasting on April 16, 1984; it was the fourth commercial television station established in New Hampshire. The station's sign-on came amidst a "television boom" in the state, long dominated by WMUR-TV in Manchester. In a short span, WNDS (channel 50) in Derry signed on while WNHT and WGOT (channel 60) in Merrimack all received construction permits, generating concerns as to whether the state could support them all. An article in the Concord Monitor asked, "Is New Hampshire Large Enough For Three New Stations?" Even though there were relatively few stations in New Hampshire, any new station in the state would have to compete more broadly in the Boston television market for programs, viewers, and advertisers. Launch programs included a nightly 5:30 p.m. newscast, a daily talk show titled New Hampshire Today, and a weekend public affairs program hosted by the editor of New Hampshire Profiles.

== Flatley ownership ==
Less than four months after channel 21 began broadcasting, NHTV 21 sold the station to Thomas Flatley, a real estate developer, for $5 million. This sale was precipitated by disagreements between the Shaines and Gikas. The transaction closed in December of that year; one of Flatley's first actions was to trim WNHT's news staff from seven to four employees and fire the general manager. A month later, the station axed its local news service altogether pending the hiring of a new general manager. By 1986, this had been restored in a reduced form: channel 21 aired five 90-second news breaks each evening and a six-minute program inserted into a half-hour of CNN Headline News, all produced by a three-person team.

Channel 21 programs included the Financial News Network (which had been dropped by Boston's WQTV), local news and public affairs programs, and other syndicated shows. The station's studios hosted the drawings for Tri-State Megabucks, the first game offered by the Tri-State Lottery—formed by Maine, New Hampshire, and Vermont—when it began in 1985. In 1986, Flatley was awarded a permit to build a second television station, channel 68 in Syracuse, New York, and channel 21 strengthened its sports portfolio the next year when it became the first-ever TV home of New Hampshire Wildcats athletic events.

== CBS affiliation ==
Flatley, however, also sought to raise WNHT's statewide profile, which led to a transformation in programming philosophy and orientation. In late 1987, the station applied for an affiliation with CBS. It commissioned a study that found that, in the Concord area, CBS was a poor third-place finisher and that an affiliation with channel 21 would make $2 million a year in profit for the network and increase its audience. CBS gave channel 21 the green light in January, after six months and nearly $50,000 spent on lobbying the network, and on February 2, 1988, WNHT became a CBS affiliate, the second New Hampshire-based network affiliate in the region alongside WMUR-TV. Further, the station invested $2 million to build out a full-sized news department to deliver nightly newscasts beginning May 31. Flatley and general manager Ron Pulera sensed that there was room in the growing state for a second network-affiliated station; further, Flatley believed that southern New Hampshire could become its own market within several years. Of the more than 2 million households in the Boston area of dominant influence in 1988, 311,100 came from the six included counties in southern New Hampshire; on its own, this would have been the 80th-ranked ADI, ahead of Chattanooga, Tennessee.

We believe that if we can get advertisers to focus on New Hampshire as a separate market, and on New Hampshire television as a separate medium, we will all benefit from it.

— Ron Pulera, general manager of WNHT

The switch from an independent station to CBS boosted ad revenue, though ratings in some time slots plummeted: the new local newscasts fared far worse than Star Trek had at 6 p.m. The station failed to draw viewers who had been used to tuning to WNEV-TV for CBS programming. Further exacerbating the young affiliate's woes, market conditions had begun to change during 1988. Total market advertising revenue started to decline, and there was increasing nervousness about the state of the regional and national economy. These changes came atop other structural factors, such as the need for the New Hampshire TV stations to compete with Boston outlets—which had stepped up their competition for New Hampshire advertisers—and their lack of statewide cable penetration. In Keene, WNHT started a signature-collecting campaign and enlisted letters of support from Governor John Sununu and representative Judd Gregg (son of station founder Hugh) to try and convince Paragon Cable to offer the station to the local system's 10,000 subscribers, but the system refused to bump the CBS affiliate in Hartford, Connecticut, to make room or to pay the out-of-market copyright fees that would be required to add channel 21. WNHT's weekly circulation of 134,000 New Hampshire homes was just over half that of WNDS (255,000) and far behind WMUR-TV (seen in 491,000 homes). Its 6 p.m. local newscast had 2,000 viewers; WMUR-TV had 51,000.

By late February 1989, the slow advertising market had caught up with channel 21: it cut back some local newscasts, axed its Sunday morning public affairs show, and laid off 15 staffers.

== Demise and sale ==
It was a strong station as an alternative before. People already have their viewing habits formed for CBS programming.

— Jack Foley, general manager of WNDS, on the challenges facing WNHT

The softening market, however, could not be responded to by merely cutting back on newscasts. On March 31, 1989, Flatley announced that WNHT would go off the air, with some of its staff and equipment being absorbed by WNDS, at the time up for auction without much interest from buyers; general manager Ron Pulera declared that the ratings "have now painfully shown us that there is no market for this type of station". On the final night of telecasting, the station did not air its local newscasts, instead airing episodes of Three's Company and an announcement advising viewers of the impending closure, and signed off at midnight, in the middle of The Pat Sajak Show. Flatley would compare the emotions he felt when announcing the station's closure to staffers to euthanizing his dog. It would turn out that WNDS would hire fewer WNHT staffers than Flatley claimed it would, though Flatley gave his customer list to the Derry station and would receive a portion of revenue generated from those advertising accounts.

The closure of WNHT, which had already lost $3 million in 1988 and was set to do the same in 1989, took the CBS network by surprise and revealed a series of miscalculations by Flatley as to the size of the advertising market. It was just the second time in the previous decade that a CBS affiliate had closed. After the station shut down, it was revealed that WNHT received no compensation from CBS to air its programming, unusual for the time, in part because Concord already received signals from two other CBS affiliates. The closure also left 55 people out of work; some of the news staff, including former main anchor Steve Schiff, sued Flatley and accused him of overpromising on the stability of the station and his willingness to honor what he called a three- to five-year commitment to news at WNHT. The station's newscast beat out WMUR for best in the state in that year's New Hampshire Broadcasters Association awards, held a month after it closed.

The channel 21 license remained active despite the station's shutdown. In 1990, Flatley exited television by selling the Syracuse TV station for $7 million to Charles A. McFadden of Norfolk, Virginia. The company then reached a deal to sell WNHT to Stephen M. Mindich, who owned the weekly Boston Phoenix newspaper. That deal, though, hinged on the ability of Mindich's Rogue Television Corporation to close a deal to buy Boston-area WHRC-TV (channel 46), which he was to rename WPHX; the stations were to be affiliates of the planned Star Television Network, airing classic TV shows.

The Mindich deal won FCC approval but fell apart in negotiations, and in 1992, Flatley sold channel 21 to New England Television, Inc., a company headed by Wilson Hickham; the station would likely have aired religious programming. The sale did not include the transmitter site, which Flatley retained. Ultimately, Hickham did not rebuild channel 21 himself and found a buyer from Boston who was interested. In late 1993, Boston University Communications, a for-profit division of the university, had started WABU (channel 68) in Boston, a general-entertainment commercial independent. A month after starting up that station, the company purchased WNHT from Hickham with plans to use it as a satellite station of WABU and gain signal parity with its competitors.

The use of the channel 21 facility by BU was delayed by complaints from WNDS and WGOT, who did not want to compete with a market-wide station for programming. In late June 1995, the BU purchase of WNHT was approved by the FCC; channel 21, renamed WNBU, returned that fall as a full-time repeater of the Boston outlet with no studio presence.

== See also ==
- WBPX-TV
