= Statues of James Michael Curley =

Pair of statues in Boston, Massachusetts, U.S.

- Artist: Lloyd Lillie
- Year: 1980
- Medium: Bronze
- Subject: James Michael Curley
- Dimensions: 200 cm × 76 cm × 200 cm (77 in × 30 in × 80 in)
- Location: Congress and North streets, Boston, Massachusetts; 42°21′37.9″N 71°3′25.2″W

Two statues of James Michael Curley (sometimes called James Michael Curley, Jr.) are installed at the intersection of Congress and North streets, in Boston, Massachusetts, United States. The bronze double portrait was created by Lloyd Lillie during 1979–1980, and dedicated on September 18, 1980. The standing figure measures approximately 77 x 30 x 80 in., and the seated statue measures approximately 55 x 38 x 43 in. The memorial was surveyed by the Smithsonian Institution's "Save Outdoor Sculpture!" program in 1993.

== See also ==
- 1980 in art
