= Channel 68 virtual TV stations in the United States =

The following television stations operate on virtual channel 68 in the United States:

- KPXD-TV in Arlington, Texas
- KTLN-TV in Novato, California
- W18EN-D in Sion Farm, St Croix, U.S. Virgin Islands
- WABM in Birmingham, Alabama
- WBPX-TV in Boston, Massachusetts
- WDTJ-LD in Toledo, Ohio
- WEFS in Cocoa, Florida
- WFUT-DT in Newark, New Jersey
- WIWN in Fond du Lac, Wisconsin
- WJAL in Hagerstown, Maryland
- WKMJ-TV in Louisville, Kentucky
- WLFG in Grundy, Virginia
- WMFD-TV in Mansfield, Ohio
- WNYS-CD in Ithaca, New York
- WSYT in Syracuse, New York
- WVSN in Humacao, Puerto Rico

The following stations, which are no longer licensed, formerly operated on virtual channel 68 in the United States:

- W38FI-D in Laurel, Mississippi
