= John Barry Tablet =

Sculpture in Boston, Massachusetts, U.S.

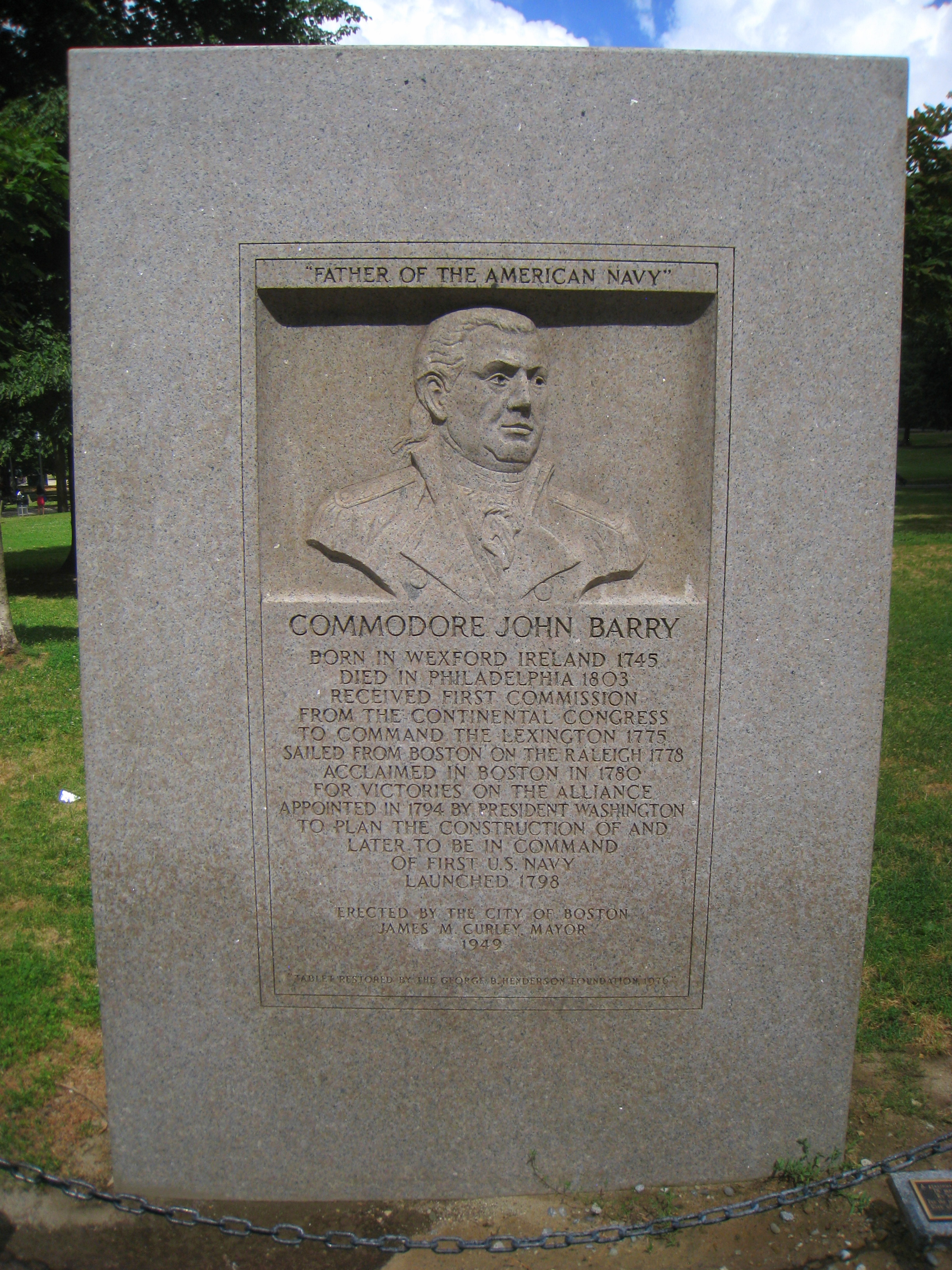
- Artist: John Francis Paramino
- Year: 1949 (original); 1977 (copy)
- Medium: Bronze (original); granite (copy)
- Location: Boston, Massachusetts, U.S.; 42°21′20.2″N 71°3′47.5″W

John Barry Tablet (also known as Commodore John Barry) is a tablet with a portrait bust in relief of naval officer John Barry by John Francis Paramino, installed in Boston Common in Boston, Massachusetts, United States.

== Description ==
The rectangular tablet features a portrait bust in relief of Barry. An inscription below reads: FATHER OF THE AMERICAN NAVY" / COMMODORE JOHN BARRY / BORN IN WEXFORD IRELAND 1745 / DIED IN PHILADELPHIA 1803 / RECEIVED FIRST COMMISSION / FROM THE CONTINENTAL CONGRESS / TO COMMAND THE LEXINGTON 1775 / SAILED FROM BOSTON ON THE RALEIGH 1778 / ACCLAIMED IN BOSTON IN 1780 / FOR VICTORIES ON THE ALLIANCE / APPOINTED IN 1794 BY PRESIDENT WASHINGTON / TO PLAN THE CONSTRUCTION OF AND LATER TO BE IN COMMAND / OF FIRST U.S. NAVY / LAUNCHED 1798 / ERECTED BY THE CITY OF BOSTON / JAMES M. CURLEY MAYOR / 1949 / TABLET RESTORED BY THE GEORGE HENDERSON FOUNDATION 1976.

== History ==
The original sculpture was commissioned by the City of Boston in 1948 and cast in bronze in 1949. After being stolen, a granite copy was commissioned and installed in 1977. The original was returned and became part of the collection of the Constitution Museum.

The work was surveyed as part of the Smithsonian Institution's "Save Outdoor Sculpture!" program in 1993.
