= Boston Public Garden =

Botanical garden in Boston, Massachusetts

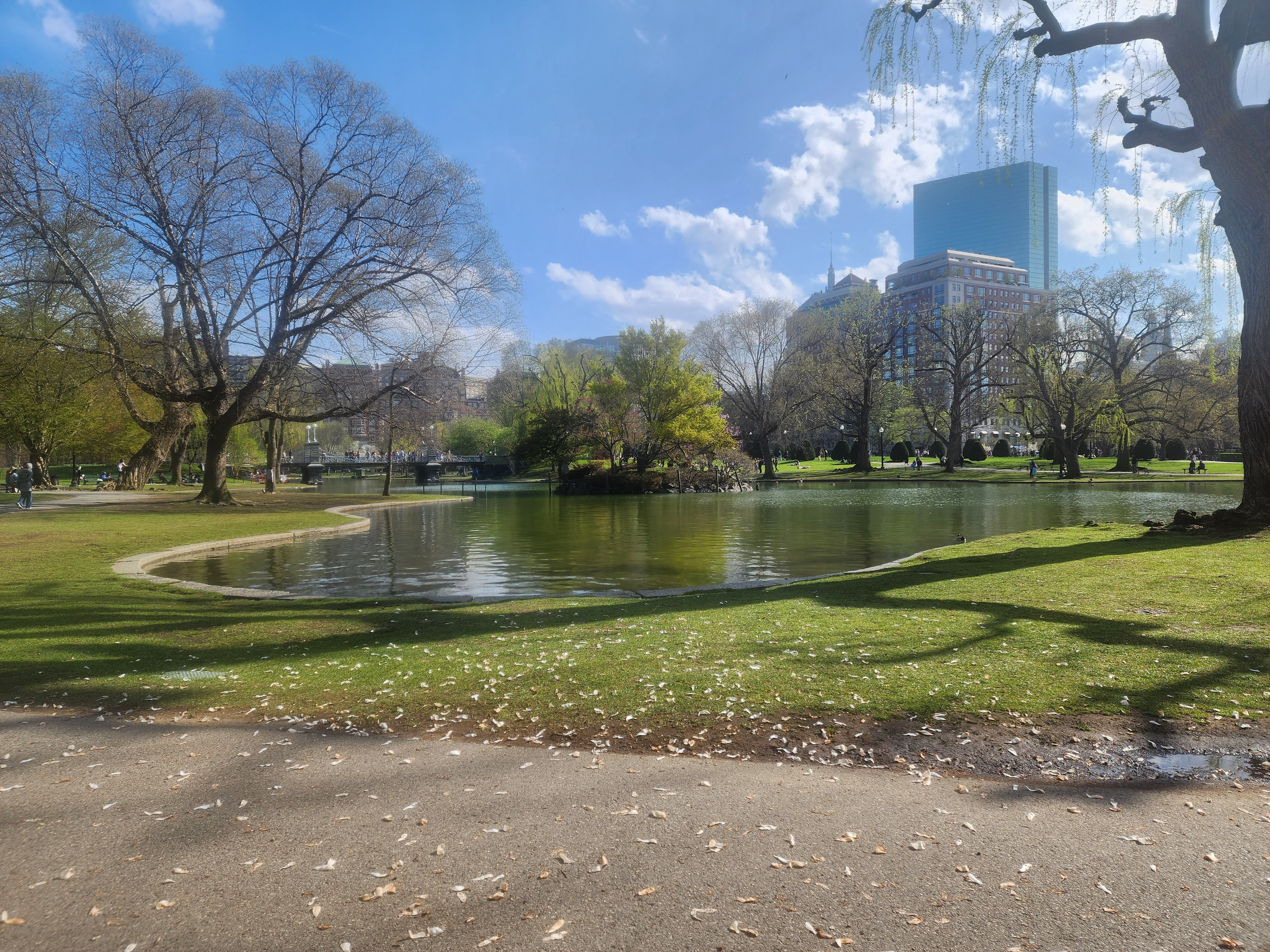
- Boston Public Garden Pond in 2025
- Interactive map of Boston Public Garden
- Location: Boston, Massachusetts, US
- Area: 24 acres (97,000 m^{2})
- Opened: 1837
- Boston Public Garden
- U.S. National Register of Historic Places
- U.S. National Historic Landmark District
- Boston Landmark
- Location within Boston Location within Massachusetts Location within the United States
- NRHP reference No.: 72000144 (original); 87000761 (new)

Significant dates
- Added to NRHP: July 12, 1972 (original, in NRHP also including Boston Common); February 27, 1987 (new, as NHL of Boston Public Garden alone)
- Designated NHLD: February 27, 1987
- Designated BOSL: May 10, 1977

The Public Garden, also known as Boston Public Garden, is a 24-acre (9.7 ha) park in the Downtown Boston neighborhood of Boston, Massachusetts, United States. Located just west of Boston Common, it is a part of the Emerald Necklace system of parks and is bounded by Charles Street and Boston Common to the east, Beacon Street and Beacon Hill to the north, Arlington Street and Back Bay to the west, and Boylston Street to the south. The Public Garden was the first public botanical garden in the United States, having been established in 1837. It is a National Historic Landmark District and a Boston Landmark.

The landscape was designed by George F. Meacham. The paths and flower beds were laid out by city engineer, James Slade and forester John Galvin. The plan for the garden includes over a dozen monumental fountains and statues, many of which were erected from the late 1860s onward. There is also a lagoon with a small bridge traversing it.

== History ==
=== Early history ===
Boston's Back Bay, including the Public Garden's site, was mudflats until filling began in the early 19th century. Originally, the Shawmut Peninsula's western shoreline in this area was at Charles Street, at the eastern end of the modern Public Garden. The first part of Back Bay to be filled was the Public Garden site, which was used as a ropewalk. The town of Boston granted ropemakers use of the land on July 30, 1794, after a fire had destroyed ropewalks in a more populated area of the city. The ropemakers were also authorized to construct a 60-foot-wide (18 m) road (now Charles Street), which was built c. 1804. After the new ropewalks burned down two more times, the ropewalks' owners offered to give back the site to the town government in 1824.

In 1824, the government of Boston (now reconstituted as a city) bought back the land for about $55,000. (Note: Equivalent to $2.0 million in 2025) This land constituted the northernmost 80 feet (24 m) of what would later become the Public Garden site. The government proposed filling the remaining area west of Charles Street and splitting it into five blocks, but this plan failed. The next year, a proposal to turn the land into a cemetery was defeated by a vote of 1,632–176. For the next decade, the land remained relatively undisturbed following an agreement between the city and the Water Power Company. The southern boundary of the site, Boylston Street, would not be laid out until August 1843. Much of the site was still mudflats extending to Clarendon Street, which at the time was the border between the then-independent cities of Boston and Roxbury.

=== Development ===
==== 1830s to early 1850s: Establishment and development threats ====
On September 25, 1837, philanthropist Horace Gray petitioned for the use of land as a botanical garden. Gray's petition was accepted on November 6, subject to deed restrictions that prevented any structures on the site except a small toolshed and greenhouse. The Public Garden thus became the first public botanical garden in the United States. By 1839, Gray and his associates had established a new corporation, the "Proprietors of the Botanic Garden in Boston", to create a garden. This organization built a plant and bird conservatory near Beacon and Charles streets. John Fottler Sr., dubbed "the Father of Our Parks", delivered the first load of plants ever set at the garden. One writer related that the garden's initial landscaping consisted of a wide pathway between Beacon Street and the Common, "with a border planted with ornamental trees, shrubbery, standard roses, herbaceous and other plants". Due to the site's topography, which included sections 4 to 6 feet (1.2 to 1.8 m) below grade, only part of the site was laid out. The garden also had the first poinsettia reported to have been planted in Boston, some large beds of dahlia, along with imported plants such as English tulips. The conservatory burned down after several years.

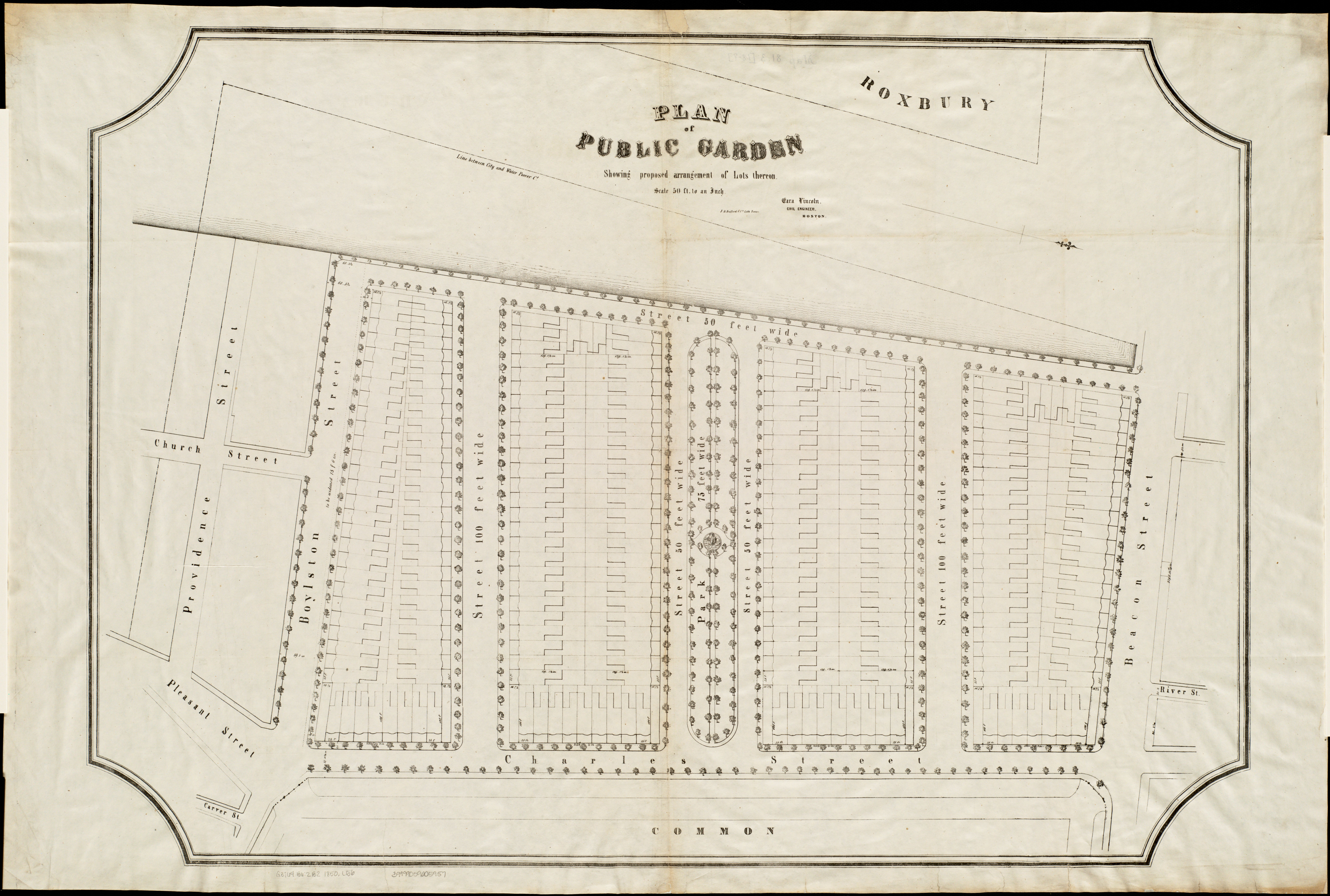
1850 plan for the Public Garden (not adopted)

Meanwhile, there was constant pressure for the land to be sold to private interests for the construction of new housing. In 1842 and 1843, there were unsuccessful attempts to sell the Public Garden. The early 1840s efforts led to the sale of land south of Boylston Street. The state's legislature, the Massachusetts General Court, created the Commissioners on Boston Harbor and the Back Bay in 1848 to determine how best to develop the land. The city of Boston wanted the state's permission to develop the mudflats west of Charles Street to the Roxbury city boundary, but it lost out to the state commission, which wanted to build an upper-class neighborhood. The city government lost its bid to develop the Back Bay to the Commissioners on Boston Harbor. In retaliation, the Boston City Council threatened to sell the garden to housing developers, which would have significantly reduced the desirability of the area for upper class residents.

As a compromise, in 1853, the state offered the city two sites at Berkeley Street, in exchange for the city's assurance that the Public Garden would not be developed. A proposal for the garden, published in the Gleason's Pictorial Drawing-Room Companion that year, called for a formal square landscape bounded by Beacon, Charles, and Boylston streets and a new road at the western boundary. The next year, the state commissioners proposed receding the Public Garden's northern boundary to Marlborough Street and its southern boundary to Newbury Street, providing an additional city block on either side for development. The garden's western boundary would also be moved westward one block from Arlington to Berkeley Street, connecting with Commonwealth Avenue, and adding 11 acres (4.5 ha) to the garden. The state rescinded the offer after the city demanded a much larger area. In response, the city proposed developing the Public Garden site and extending Commonwealth Avenue into the garden.

==== Late 1850s and 1860s: Construction of modern garden ====
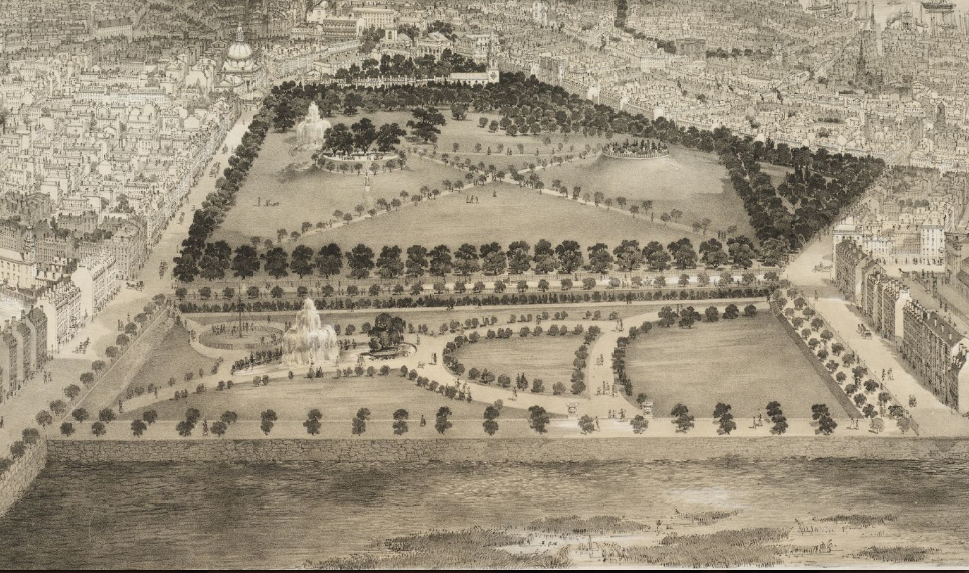
Drawing of the Public Garden in 1850, facing east. Note the empty foreground: where the Back Bay neighborhood is today, mudflats are seen in this drawing.

The conflict over the garden's area was finally resolved when the city, the state, and the Boston Water Power Company agreed to the Tripartite Indenture of 1856. As part of the agreement, Arlington Street was set as the garden's western boundary. Boston's government gave up its rights to develop any non-horticultural buildings on the garden's site between Arlington and Charles streets. It received in exchange a strip of land abutting Arlington Street, which was to become part of the garden. On April 26, 1859, voters approved the agreement by a 6,287–99 margin.

In October 1859, Alderman Crane submitted the detailed plan for the Garden to the Committee on the Common and Public Squares and received approval. Afterward, construction began on the modern garden. Earth from more hilly portions of Beacon Hill was used to fill the mudflats. The pond was finished that year, and the wrought iron fence at the perimeter was erected in 1862. At the north side of the pond was originally a peninsula, but the site became so popular with lovers that John Galvin, the city forester, decided to sever the peninsula's connection, turning it into an island. Arlington Street was laid out in 1861.

=== 1870s to 1890s ===
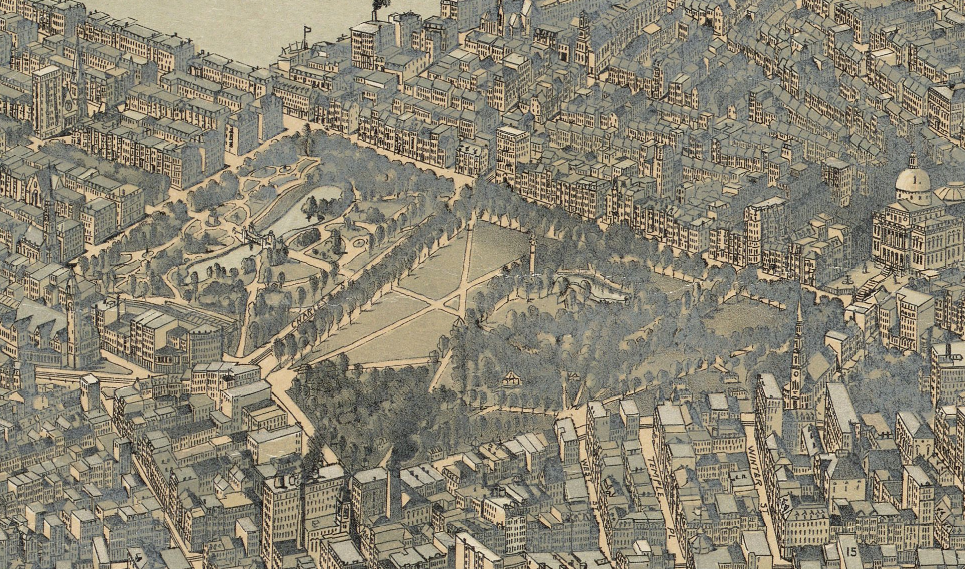
An 1899 drawing of the Common and garden. Compared to 49 years earlier, the Back Bay is now completely filled in, and the garden much more closely resembles that of today.

The garden retained the same general layout after its construction in the 1850s and 1860s. Gas lamps were originally used to light the garden at night, but in 1883, construction of electric lamps was begun. There was initially concern over the use of electric lamps, as it would require wires to be run through the garden, and some members of government feared that it would harm the esthetics of the place. Beacon Street became a toll-free road in 1868, leading to the construction of Back Bay around the garden.

Originally, the Charles Street side of the Public Garden (along with the adjacent portions of Boston Common) was used as an unofficial dumping ground, as it was the lowest-lying portion of the garden. This, along with the garden's originally being a salt marsh, resulted in this edge of the Public Garden being "a moist stew that reeked and that was a mess to walk over, steering people to other parts of the park". Although plans had long been in place to regrade this portion of the Garden, the cost of moving the amount of soil necessary—approximately 9,000 cu yd (6,900 m^{3}), weighing 14,000 short tons (13,000,000 kg)—prevented the work from being undertaken. This finally changed after the Tremont Street subway's Tremont incline was built in the garden in 1895. The soil from the incline's excavation was used to regrade the Charles Street sides of both the Public Garden and the Common.

=== 20th century ===
==== 1900s and 1910s ====
The city's park superintendent announced plans in 1901 to replant the area near the Arlington Street entrance, and the city's art commission approved the Common Council's action that year to remove a statue of Edward Everett, which had stood in the garden for three decades. Concurrently, merchant John Foster had bequeathed funds for a statue commemorating William Ellery Channing, who had once preached across the street from the garden. Installation of the Channing statue began in 1902, and it was dedicated in June 1903. In early 1906, Bunkio Matsuki arranged for the importation and installation of a Japanese lantern along the pond's shoreline. By that decade, the garden was recorded as having 985 tree specimens from 85 species, and there was a sand garden open only to children. Christmas trees were also gathered up and sold at the garden every year, and elaborate floral arrangements were displayed during the springtime.

By the early 1910s, the Boston Art Commission was studying the possibility of relocating three statues in the Commonwealth Avenue malls to a new row of statuary along the Charles Street side of the Public Garden. A water pumping station was also proposed to be installed under the Charles Street entrance in 1912, but the city government eventually decided to put the station in the Common. The City Council placed the garden and the Common under the direct management of the city's park department on January 6, 1913, and the statue of Edward Everett Hale was dedicated near Charles Street that May.

When James Michael Curley was elected as Boston's mayor in 1914, he suggested selling the Public Garden to raise an estimated $10 million to pay the city's debts. (Note: Equivalent to $237.1 million in 2025) Curley's proposal elicited substantial criticism and was not taken seriously. The park department also blocked the Art Commission's proposal to move the Commonwealth Avenue statues to Charles Street, prompting another disagreement over the statuary. Later that year, the Tremont Street subway's Tremont incline was closed; the portion of the garden occupied by the incline was incorporated into a widened Boylston Street. With the widening of Boylston Street, the park commission decided to place a mall of statues along that street. The first statue to be placed on the mall was a statue of Wendell Phillips, sculpted by Daniel Chester French and dedicated in April 1915. The US government temporarily added anti-aircraft defenses in the garden in 1918, during World War I, and the sidewalk on the Charles Street side was narrowed to provide parking space. The same year, an existing flagpole was destroyed by lightning.

==== 1920s to 1950s ====
In the 1920s, the garden's paths and landscaping was maintained by a series of civic groups, who often did not coordinate with each other. The city appropriated funds for a new flagpole, which was dedicated in November 1920. The next year, the city funded a bronze base for the flagpole, and an entrance to the Tremont Street subway's Arlington station was built within the Public Garden. Anna Coleman Ladd was also commissioned to design the Triton Babies Fountain, which was dedicated in 1922. By then, the existing footbridge above the pond had deteriorated, and the city government allocated funds for a new steel bridge. French was rehired to construct the George Robert White Memorial at the Boylston Street mall, which was dedicated in October 1924. The next year, a plaque honoring the 1775 fortification of Fox Hill during the Siege of Boston was added at the Charles Street gate.

During 1926, the parks department added tropical plantings around the Washington statue. Workers also laid a new water main, built a granolithic walkway between Arlington and Charles streets, and remodeled the entrance at Beacon and Charles streets. The next statue to be installed was Theo Alice Ruggles Kitson's Tadeusz Kościuszko statue, dedicated in October 1927, followed by the Small Child Fountain, cast in 1929. Further rearrangements of the garden's paths were conducted in the late 1920s, albeit with red gravel instead of granolithic pavement.

==== 1960s to 1990s ====
In advance of the United States Bicentennial, the Boston Parks and Recreation Department announced Operation Flash in 1973. This plan sought to restore the fences, gates, irrigation and lighting system, and landscape, in addition to adding a second storage building and repairing broken fountains. Work on restoring the garden's fence began in 1975 and was completed in 1978. In 1982, the city granted an additional $25,000 for improvements to the flagpole. A circular granite bench was installed around the pole by the Friends of the Public Garden, being dedicated as the Marvin E. Goody Memorial in 1984.

=== 21st century ===
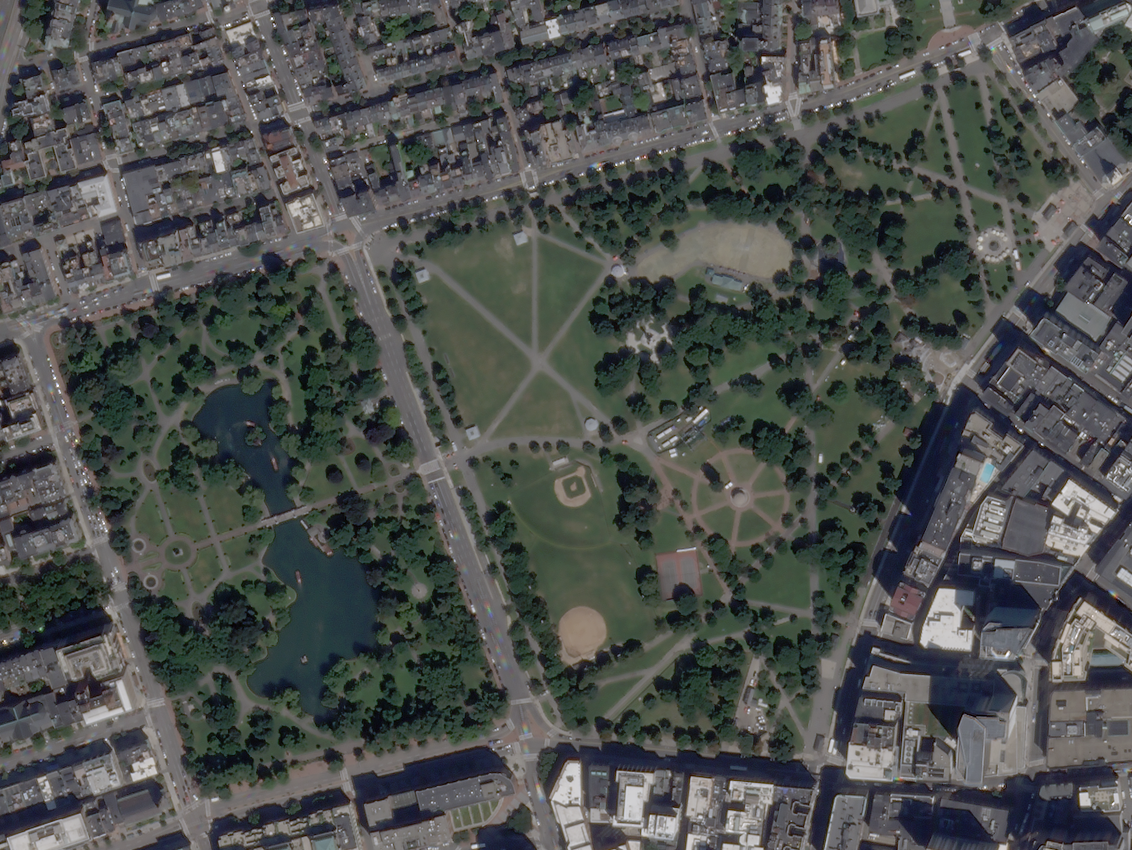
A 2017 satellite image of the Common and garden

Construction of a 9/11 memorial at the Public Garden began in 2003. The memorial, commissioned by the Massachusetts 9/11 Memorial Fund, was dedicated in July 2004; its construction was partly funded by the United States Department of Agriculture. An automated sprinkler system was installed at the Public Garden in 2008 for $800,000; the system's installation was complicated by heavy foot traffic, a multitude of plant types, the garden's historical and cultural importance, and a variety of microclimates.

Between 2020 and 2021, the Swan Boats were not operated due to the COVID-19 pandemic. Also in 2020, Friends of the Public Garden announced three renovation projects at the Public Garden and the neighboring Boston Common and Commonwealth Avenue Mall to celebrate its 50th anniversary. The project at the Public Garden involved renovating the Arlington Street entrance, along with the Boy and Bird Fountain, George Washington Statue, and Small Child Fountain near that entrance. Work on the Arlington Street entrance and monuments began in 2023 and was completed the next year. Friends of the Public Garden also created a master plan in 2024 for the gradual replacement and replanting of the garden's aging weeping willows.

== Description ==
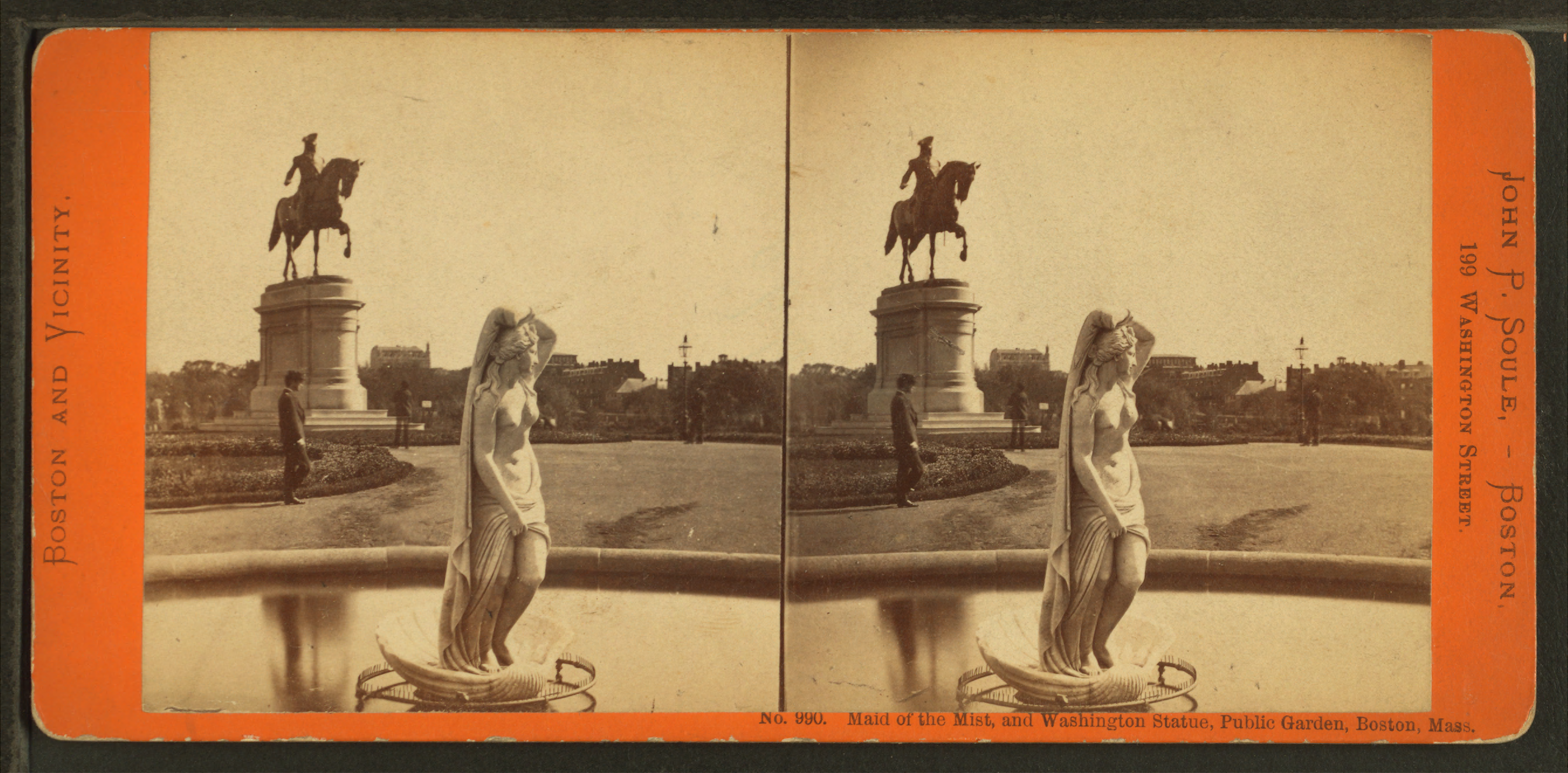
Maid of the Mist statue of Venus and behind it of George Washington in a stereoscopic image by John P. Soule

The Public Garden is located at the edge of the Back Bay (near Downtown Boston) in Boston, Massachusetts, United States. It spans 24 acres (97,000 m^{2}). (Note: A more precise area of 24.25 acres (9.81 ha) is sometimes cited.) Though the garden's name is sometimes pluralized as "Public Gardens", the official name is singular.. The park is often referred to as just the "Garden" by Boston residents.

=== Boundaries and surroundings ===
The Public Garden is rectangular and is bounded on the south by Boylston Street, on the west by Arlington Street, and on the north by Beacon Street where it faces Beacon Hill. To the east, Charles Street divides the Public Garden from Boston Common.

The Public Garden and the Common collectively span 75 acres (30 ha) and form the northern terminus of the Emerald Necklace, a meandering string of parks designed by Frederick Law Olmsted. Though the Public Garden and Common are sometimes considered one large green space, they operate independently. The Commonwealth Avenue Malls, which extends west toward the Back Bay Fens and the Muddy River, connect the Public Garden and Common with the rest of the Emerald Necklace. The city blocks to the west and north include residential structures of 5 to 6 stories. The garden's southwestern corner is next to the Arlington station on the MBTA subway's Green Line.

=== Landscaping and circulation ===
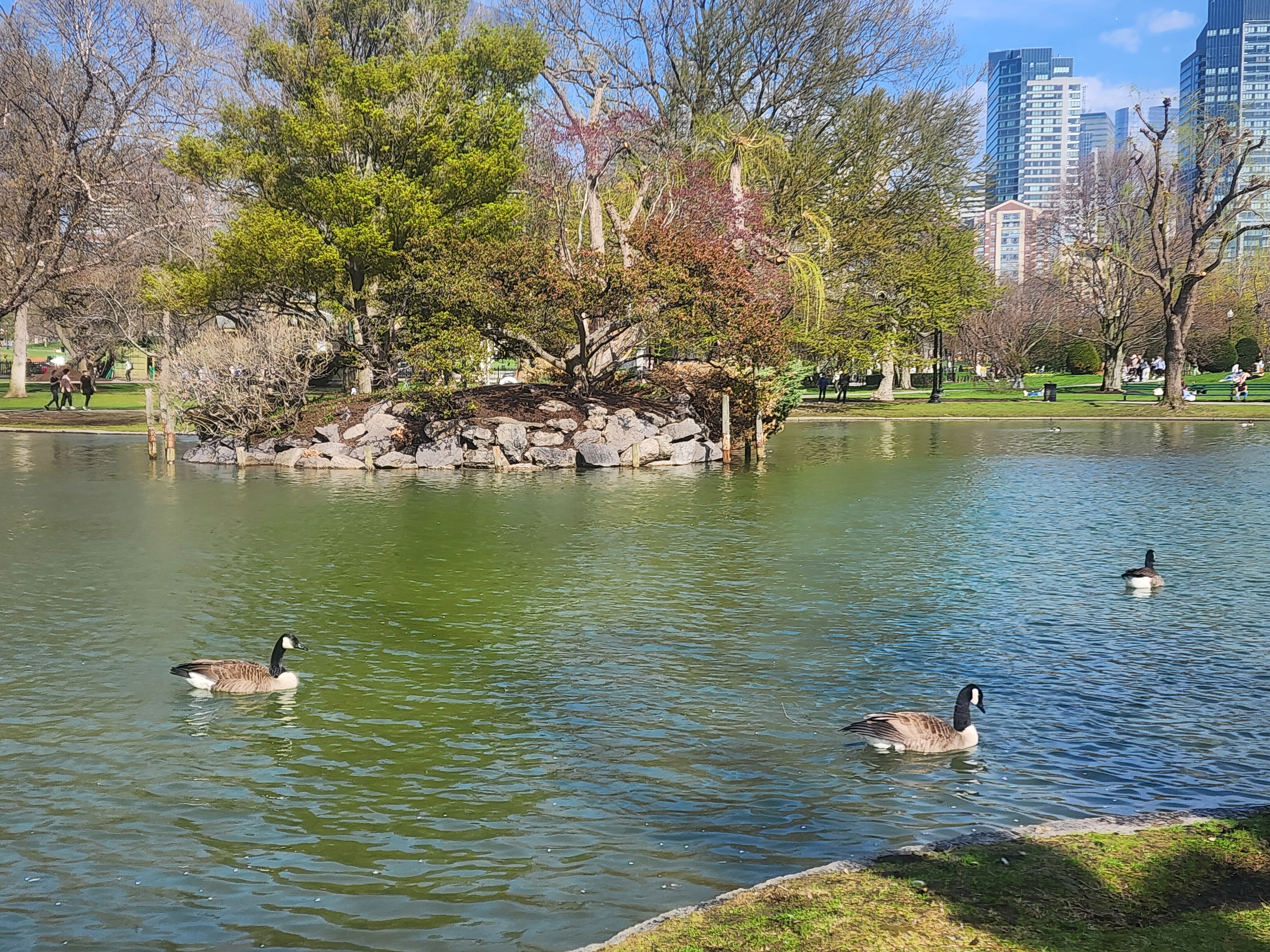
Boston Public Garden pond in April 2025

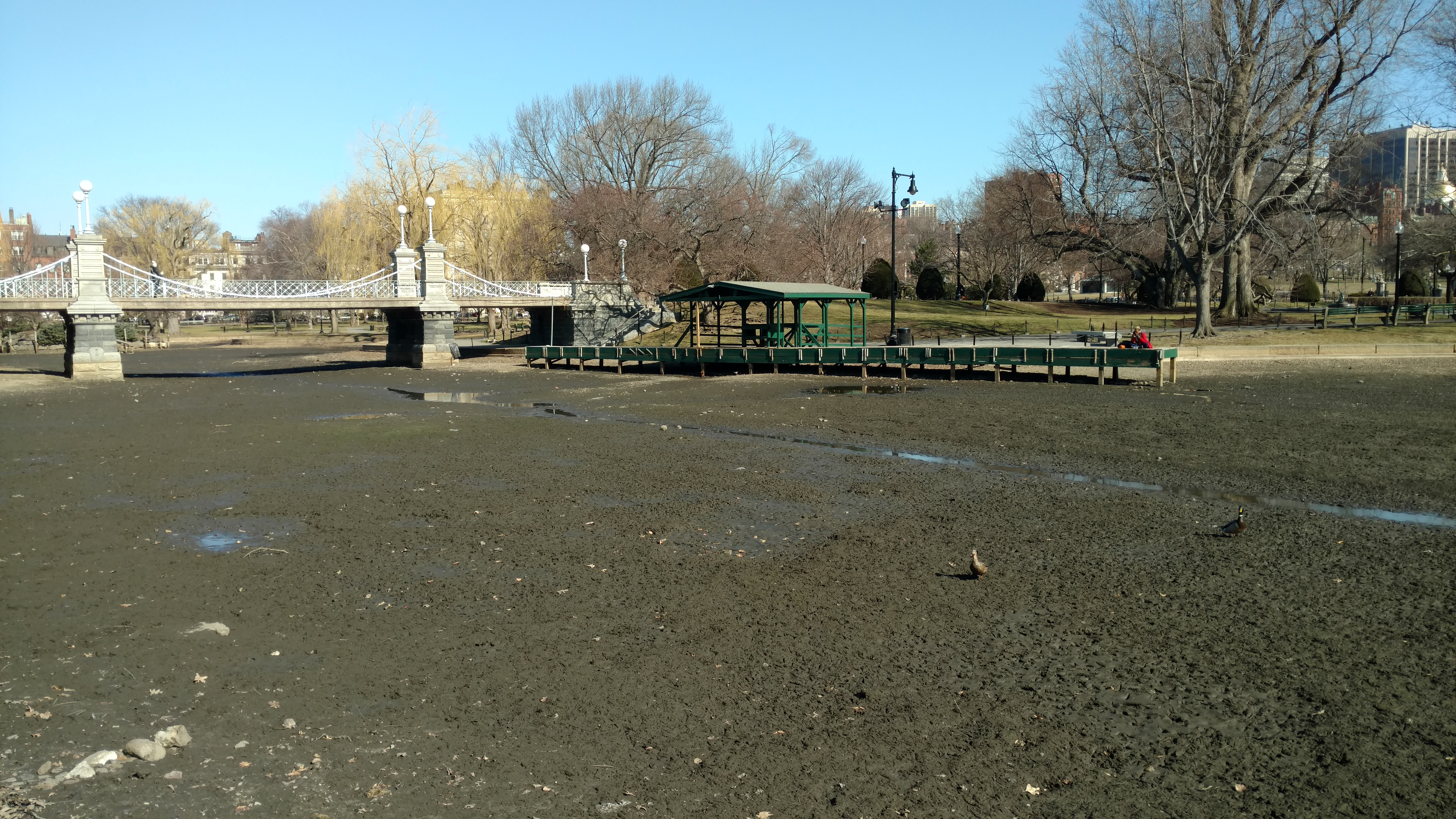
The pond drained for maintenance

The landscape was designed by George F. Meacham, who drew up plans for paths and flower beds centered around a bridge crossing a pond. The paths and flower beds were laid out by the city engineer, James Slade, and the forester, John Galvin. Mostly flat and varying in elevation by less than 5 feet (1.5 m), the garden is designed in the style of an English landscape garden, surrounding a central pond.

A straight pathway, including a bridge that crosses over its pond, spans the two main entrances of Charles and Arlington streets; this path is known as Haffenreffer Walk, after longtime Boston park commissioner Theodore Haffenreffer. The other pathways are winding and asymmetrical, and include a winding path encircling the pond. The pathways are constantly used, due to the park's central location.

==== Pond ====
The pond (also known as the lagoon) is variously cited as 4 acres (1.6 ha) or 6 acres (2.4 ha). It is the park's main feature. Being no more than 3 feet (0.91 m) deep, the pond easily freezes during the colder months. In 1879, the Boston City Council passed an order to maintain the pond for skating during the winter. The Frog Pond (located within Boston Common) drains into the Public Garden pond, being the pond's only inlet. The pond posed a significant health concern shortly after it was constructed, as it was fed by a combination of salt water from the Charles River, sewer water, and fresh water from the Frog Pond. As a result, there was often a thick slime and accompanying stench in the pond; consequently, the caretakers of the garden drain and clean the pond annually.

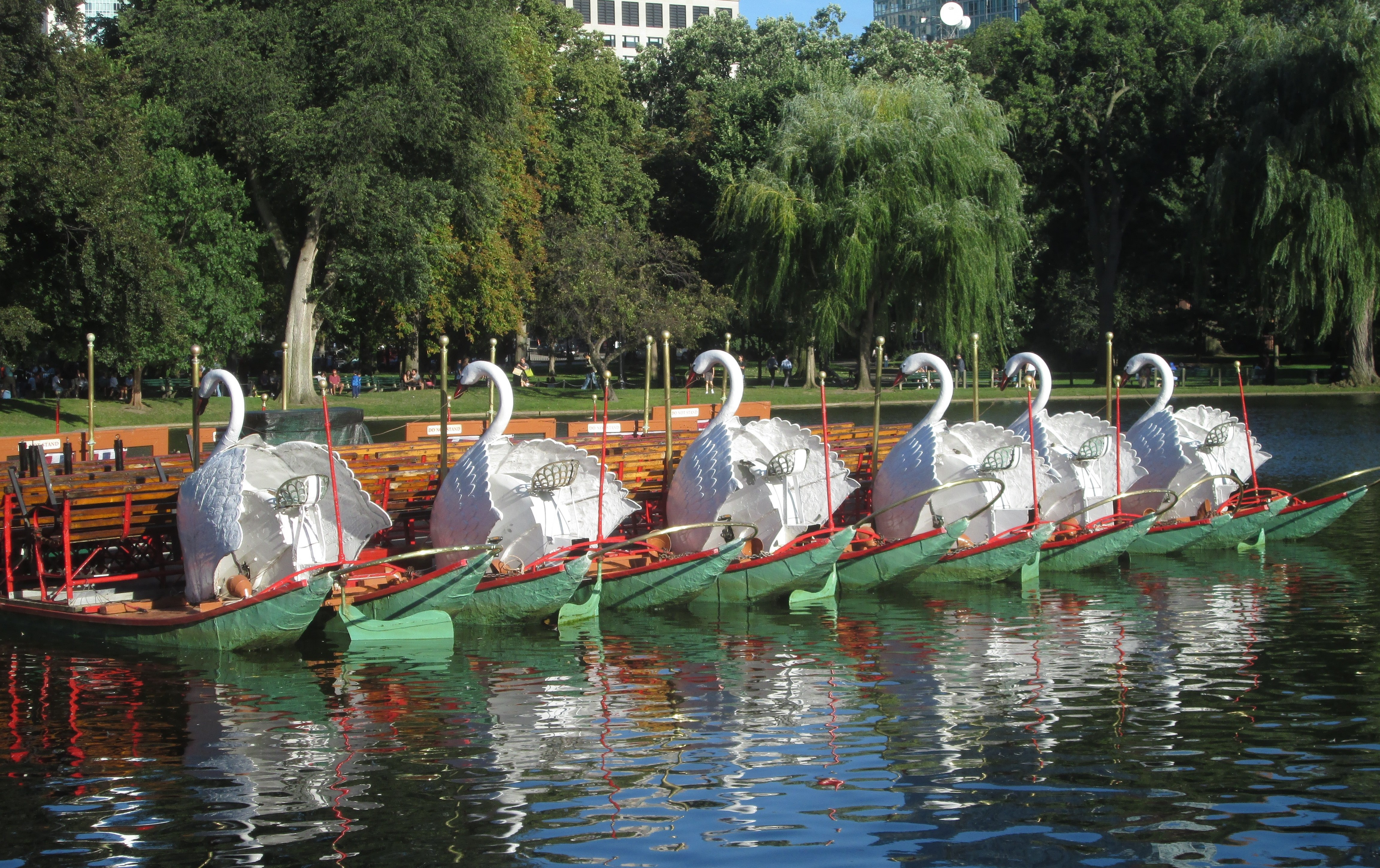
Swan boats tied up

A popular tourist attraction is the Swan Boats, which began operating in 1877. The first Swan Boats were made by Robert Paget, an immigrant shipbuilder who was inspired to create pedal-powered watercraft based on the "swan boats" depicted in the opera Lohengrin. The Swan Boats are made of copper or fiberglass and are operated by a pedal mechanism, and weigh 3 short tons (2.7 long tons; 2.7 t) when loaded with passengers. The boats operate seasonally, carrying passengers for a fee, and have been continuously operated by the Paget family into the 21st century.

The Boston Public Garden Foot Bridge crosses the pond at its narrowest point. Designed by William G. Preston, it opened in 1867. It was reportedly the world's shortest functioning suspension bridge. When the bridge was replaced in 1921, the cables became structurally redundant, with the addition of reinforcement below.

==== Plantings ====
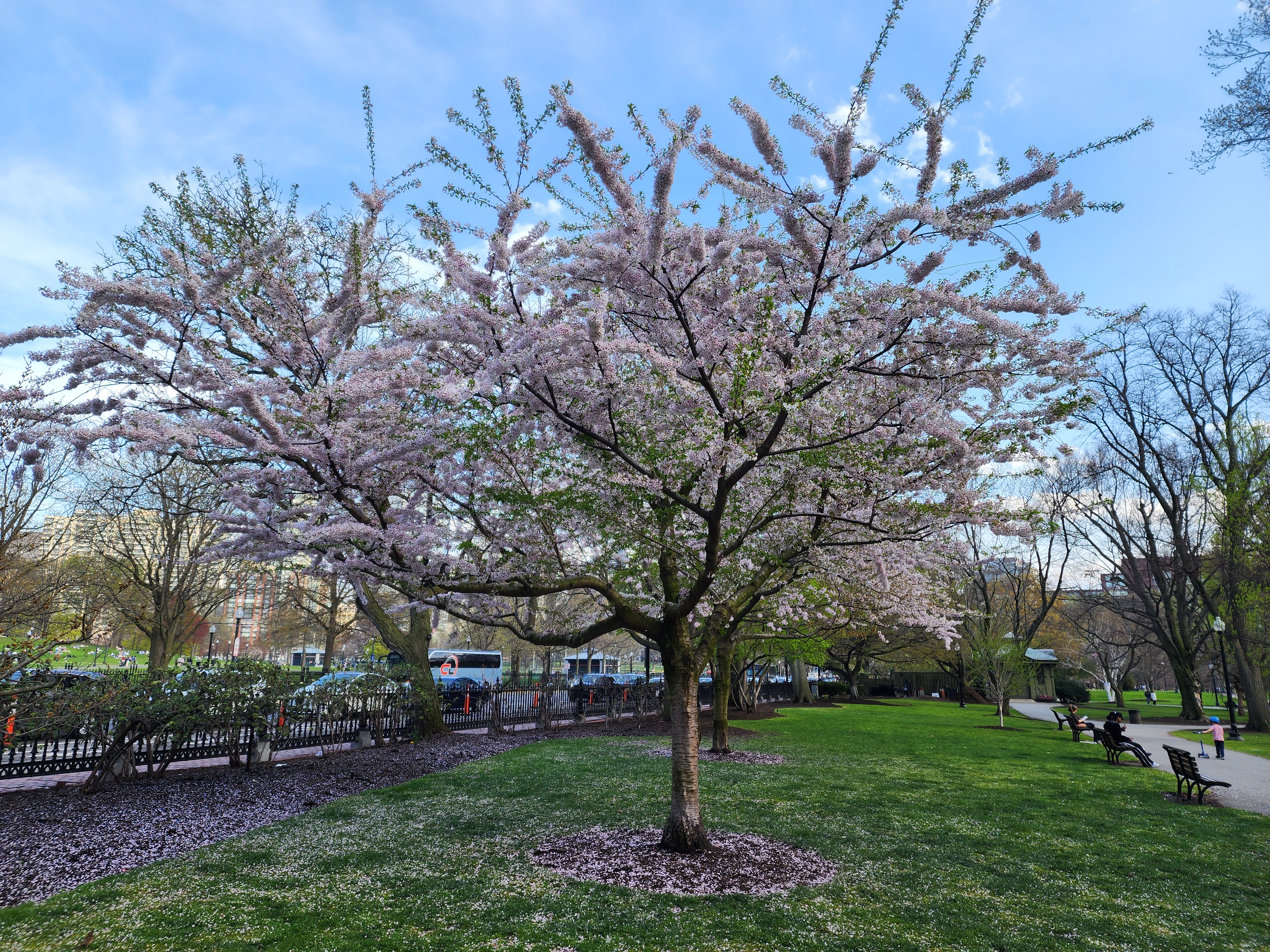
One of three Yoshino Cherry trees that currently resides in the Boston Public Garden

The Public Garden has over 80 flower species, along with approximately 125 tree species. There are 57 planting beds throughout the Public Garden. Permanent flower plantings in the garden include numerous varieties of bulbs (including tulips, heliotrope, celosia, and angelonia) and flowering shrubs. The beds flanking the central pathway are replanted on a rotating schedule throughout the year, with different flowers for each season from mid-spring through early autumn. Plantings are supplied from 14 greenhouses the city operates at Franklin Park for the purpose.

The Public Garden is planted with a wide assortment of native and introduced trees. Prominent among these are the weeping willows around the pond's shoreline, which have been present since the 1900s. The Arlington Street entrance to the garden has two Kwanzan cherries, similar to those planted in Washington, D.C.. There are various species of beeches, elms, lindens, maples, oaks, and pagodas. Other species include horse chestnuts, dawn redwoods, ginkgo trees, and one California redwood. By the late 20th century, many of the trees suffered from illness and deterioration due to pollution and pedestrian traffic.

=== Statues and monuments ===
Several statues and sculptures (including monuments) are located throughout the Public Garden. The Boston Preservation Alliance wrote in 2021 that the Public Garden had fourteen formal monuments and other sculptures (marked in the below table with bullets), of which five were sculpted by female artists. Several of the monuments—the Wendell Phillips, Thomas Cass, Tadeusz Kościuszko, and Charles Sumner statues—stand along Monument Row, a group of sculptures at the Public Garden's southern boundary on Boylston Street. The monuments include four non-circulating fountains (the Bagheera, Boy and Bird, Small Child, and Triton Babies fountains) which receive water from the city's water supply system and drain into the sewage system.

List of monuments
Name	Location	Artist	Date	Details	Refs
Bagheera Fountain •	east of the pond 42.354108°N 71.069167°W	Lilian Swann Saarinen	1986	A bronze sculpture of a lion lunging at an owl.	
Boy and Bird Fountain •	Arlington Street entrance 42.353624°N 71.071206°W	Bashka Paeff	1934	A bronze and granite statue depicting a bird landing in a boy's hand. Recast in 1977 and 1995 after being stolen.	
Charles Sumner •	Boylston Street between Arlington Street and Hadassah Way 42.352411°N 71.069832°W	Thomas Ball	1878	A bronze sculpture of Charles Sumner, a U.S. senator from Massachusetts from 1851 to 1874. Anne Whitney was supposed to have designed the statue, but outrage over the selection of a female artist led to Ball's selection instead.	
Edward Everett Hale •	Charles Street entrance 42.354469°N 71.068762°W	Bela Pratt	1913	A bronze statue of Edward Everett Hale, a preacher and writer. The statue stands on a pedestal made of pink Milford granite.	
Ether Monument •	near Arlington and Marlborough streets 42.354822°N 71.071455°W	John Quincy Adams Ward	1868	A monument commemorating the first use of ether as an anesthetic. Made of granite and red marble, the statue has carved figures telling the Parable of the Good Samaritan. It occupies the center of a square basin. Donated to the city by Thomas Lee, it is the oldest monument in the garden.	
Garden of Remembrance 9/11 Memorial	near Arlington and Newbury streets 42.352699°N 71.070782°W	Victor Walker	2004	A memorial to over 200 Massachusetts and New England residents who died during the September 11 attacks in 2001. It contains benches and a pink granite memorial amid a plant setting. It also includes a sapling from the Survivor Tree, planted in 2014.	
George Robert White Memorial •	corner of Arlington and Beacon streets 42.355351°N 71.072064°W	Daniel Chester French and Henry Bacon	1924	A fountain commemorating philanthropist George Robert White, who left $5 million for its upkeep. Constructed of granite and bronze, the fountain depicts a female figure standing above the waters. It was inoperative from the 1980s to 2016.	
George Washington •	Arlington Street entrance 42.353854°N 71.070943°W	Thomas Ball	1869	A bronze equestrian statue depicting George Washington, first President of the United States, standing upon a granite pedestal. It is one of three Washington equestrian statues in Boston.	
Japanese lantern	west shore of the pond 42.354376°N 71.070286°W	N/A	1587 (relocated 1906)	A Japanese garden lantern gifted to Boston by Bunkio Matsuki and installed at the edge of the pond in 1906. It was originally in the garden of the Momoyama palace in Kyoto and is made of cast iron.	
Make Way for Ducklings •	northeast corner of the pond 42.355515°N 71.069760°W	Nancy Schön	1987	A bronze sculpture showing eight ducklings following their mother, depicting a scene from the 1941 book Make Way for Ducklings. The sculpture was donated in memory of Robert McCloskey, author of the book, which was set at the Public Garden. Throughout the year, the eight ducklings are dressed in various outfits. A replica is installed at Novodevichy Park in Moscow.	
Marvin E. Goody Memorial •	southeast corner of the pond 42.353613°N 71.068591°W	Joan E. Goody	1984	A memorial to the sculptor's husband, architect and Public Garden advocate Marvin E. Goody. It consists of a series of granite benches surrounding a flagpole. The flagpole, consisting of a bronze base supporting a wooden shaft, was erected in 1922 by A. E. Austin and measures 100 feet (30 m) high. The flag is illuminated at night and is never lowered, and the benches were built around it in 1984.	
Michael P. Quinn plaque	top step of the footbridge's eastern landing 42.354173°N 71.069755°W	N/A	1986	A plaque honoring a soldier from Charlestown, who was killed in action during the Vietnam War in 1969.	
Small Child Fountain •	Arlington Street entrance 42.353886°N 71.071321°W	Mary E. Moore	1929	A bronze nude sculpture of a boy on a ledge. It was gifted by Mrs. Alfred Tozzer.	
Tadeusz Kościuszko •	Boylston Street and Hadassah Way 42.352554°N 71.069089°W	Theo Alice Ruggles Kitson	1927	A bronze sculpture depicting Polish soldier Tadeusz Kościuszko (sometimes anglicized as Thaddeus Kosciuszko), who fought with the Continental Army during the American Revolutionary War. The statue depicts Kościuszko in uniform with a hat in his left hand (behind his back) and papers from West Point in his right. It stands atop a bronze base.	
Thomas Cass •	Boylston Street between Hadassah Way and Charles Street 42.352623°N 71.068792°W	Richard Edwin Brooks	1899	A bronze sculpture of Thomas Cass, the commander of the 9th Regiment Massachusetts Volunteer Infantry that served in the American Civil War. The statue depicts Cass with his hands folded, and stands atop a bronze base.	
Triton Babies Fountain •	east of the pond 42.354639°N 71.069435°W	Anna Coleman Ladd	1922 (relocated 1924)	A bronze sculpture of two children playing. The sculpture was gifted by Mrs. Boylston Beal. The children are variously described as a boy and a girl, or as "two Cupids, about life size".	
Wendell Phillips •	Boylston Street between Hadassah Way and Charles Street 42.352698°N 71.068428°W	Daniel Chester French	1915	A sculpture of abolitionist Wendell Phillips commissioned for his 100th birthday, The bronze statue stands on a square base, in front of the Public Garden's south wall. It depicts Phillips with his right fist upraised and chains in his left fist.	
William Ellery Channing •	corner of Arlington and Boylston streets 42.352140°N 71.070661°W	Herbert Adams	1903	A bronze statue of preacher William Ellery Channing holding a Bible and ecclesiastical robes, set on a pink Milford granite base. Gifted by John Foster, the statue was placed across from Arlington Street Church (the site of a church where Channing once preached) at Foster's request.	

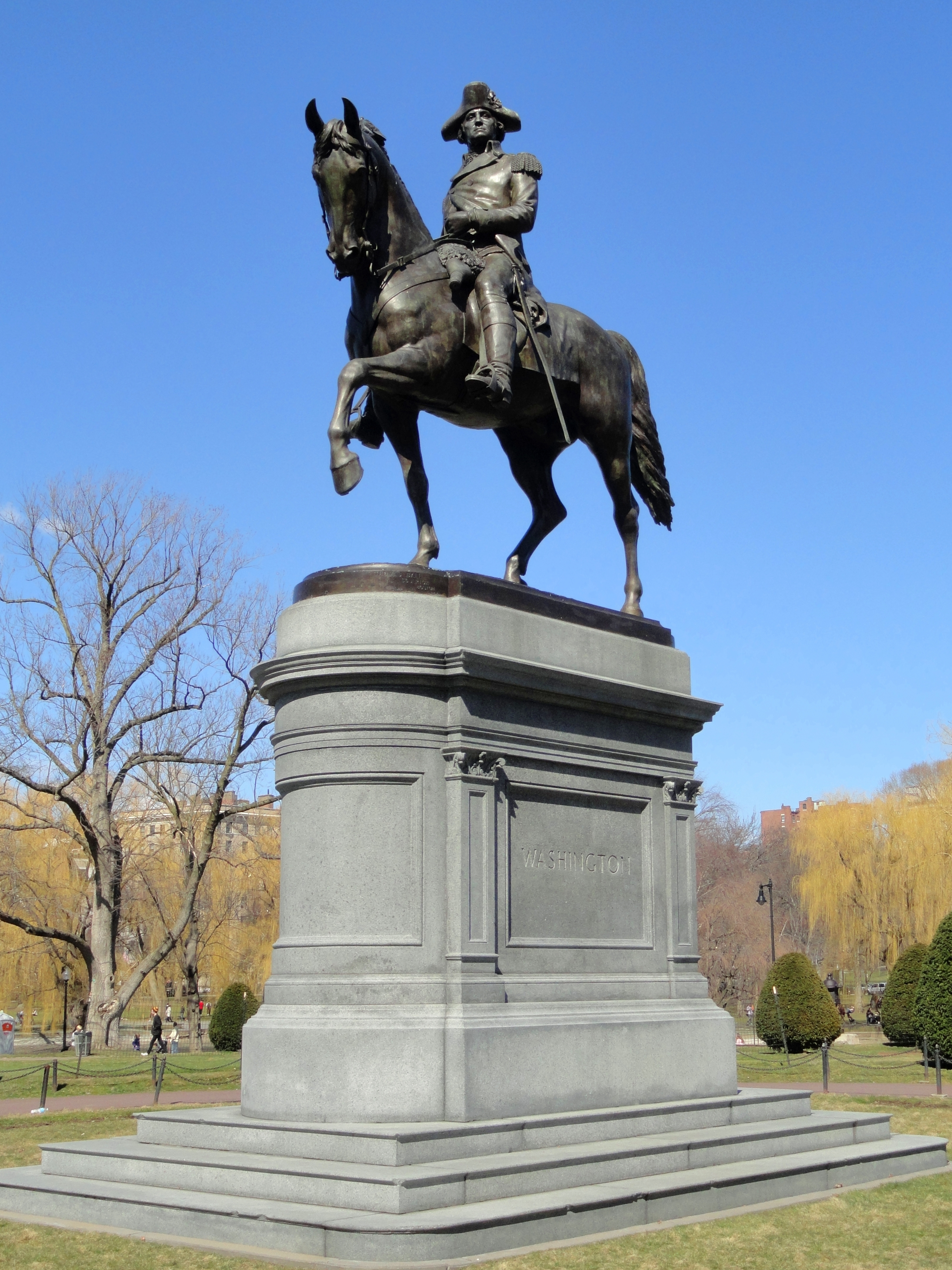
Equestrian statue of George Washington, designed by Thomas Ball

The Public Garden also includes a park bench facing the pond, which is known as the Good Will Hunting bench because it was a filming location in the 1997 film of the same name starring Robin Williams. After Williams died in 2014, the bench became an impromptu memorial to him. There was also once a birdhouse built by J. D. Wester in 1874.

=== Fauna ===
In the early 20th century, baby alligators were kept in a basin near the Arlington Street entrance; they were fed live rats and mice by local residents. The garden is also home to birds, squirrels, and other small animals. The bird species of the garden were documented in a 1909 book, Birds of the Boston Public Garden, by Horace W. Wright. There is a colony of gray squirrels as well. The Lewiston Evening Journal wrote that the island in the middle of the pond also had a large beehive in the late 20th century.

Mute swans have historically resided in the pond during the spring and summer months. A pair are annually reintroduced to the garden during the Return of the Swans celebration, where the birds are escorted to the water by a parade and brass band. The most recent pair, Romeo and Juliet, are named after the Shakespearian couple; they were discovered to both be female shortly after the legal recognition of same-sex marriage in Massachusetts in 2004.

== Management and operation ==
The garden is maintained by the Boston city government. It is open all year long, free of charge, throughout most of the day except overnight hours. The city's efforts are supplemented by a charitable organization known as the Friends of the Public Garden, founded in 1970 and registered as a 501(c)(3) organization in 1975. Friends of the Public Garden cared for the garden informally until 2020, when it signed a formal agreement with the City of Boston. The charity hires specialists to help care for the trees and bushes. Its volunteers have also helped repair monuments, provide labels for flora, and replant trees and plants.

When the city's Public Grounds Department took control of the garden in 1913, it prohibited visitors from walking upon the grass, and, at least in the early 20th century, made arrests for the offense. Nudity was also banned, though this prohibition was so broad that, in 1933, nude statues by Anna Coleman Ladd had to be covered up. After 1927, unaccompanied children were banned from entering after 9 pm. The modern-day park rules prohibit active recreation, hammocks, wading, and most events. The garden does allow wedding ceremonies.

== Impact ==
=== Reception ===
During the early 20th century, The Christian Science Monitor wrote that the garden was "the pride of every Bostonian" whenever the flowers bloomed, and that newspaper described the garden as an "oasis" with its lawns, pond, paths, and trees. Another critic wrote in 1950 that the pond and plantings "make the Boston Public Garden a place of color and enchantment from early May to late October". The Lewiston Evening Journal wrote in 1978 that the garden "remains a sort of modern day Eden, tranquil and beautiful, but never dull".

Writers Richard Berenson and Jon Marcus said in 2002, "If the Boston Common is the anchor of the Emerald Necklace, the Public Garden is the jewel". Boston Magazine wrote that "though it’s particularly lovely in the spring, there’s no season when it’s underwhelming".

=== Landmark designations ===
The Public Garden has been given official landmark designation for its role as the United States' oldest formal public botanical garden. It was added to the National Register of Historic Places in 1972 along with the adjacent Boston Common. The garden was one of the first five Boston Landmarks designated by the Boston Landmarks Commission in 1977, alongside the Common, the Adams-Nervine Asylum, the Donald McKay House, and the First Corps of Cadets' armory. The Public Garden was re-added to the NRHP in its own right in 1987 when it was designated a National Historic Landmark District

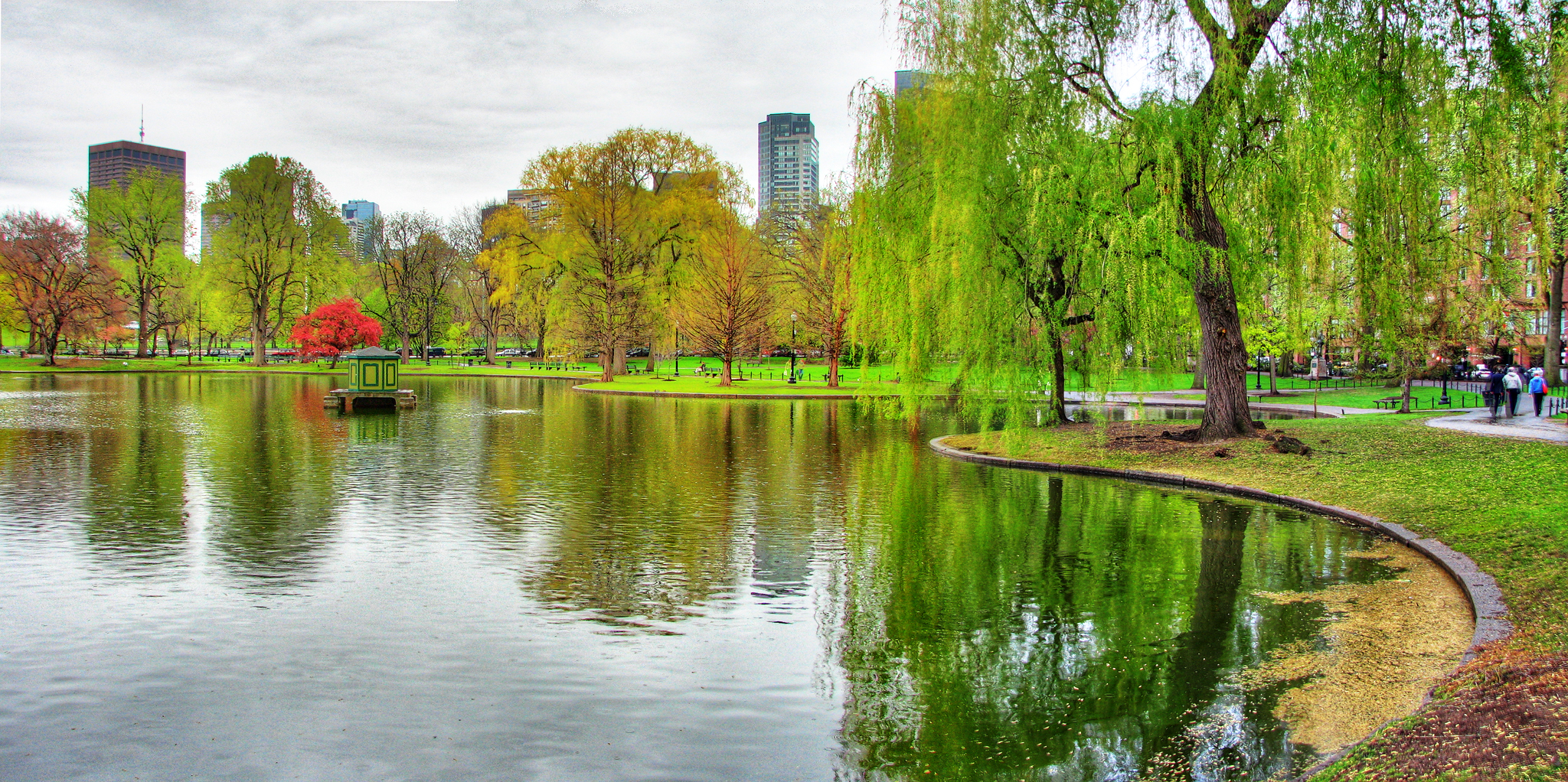
Panorama, 2006

== Gallery ==
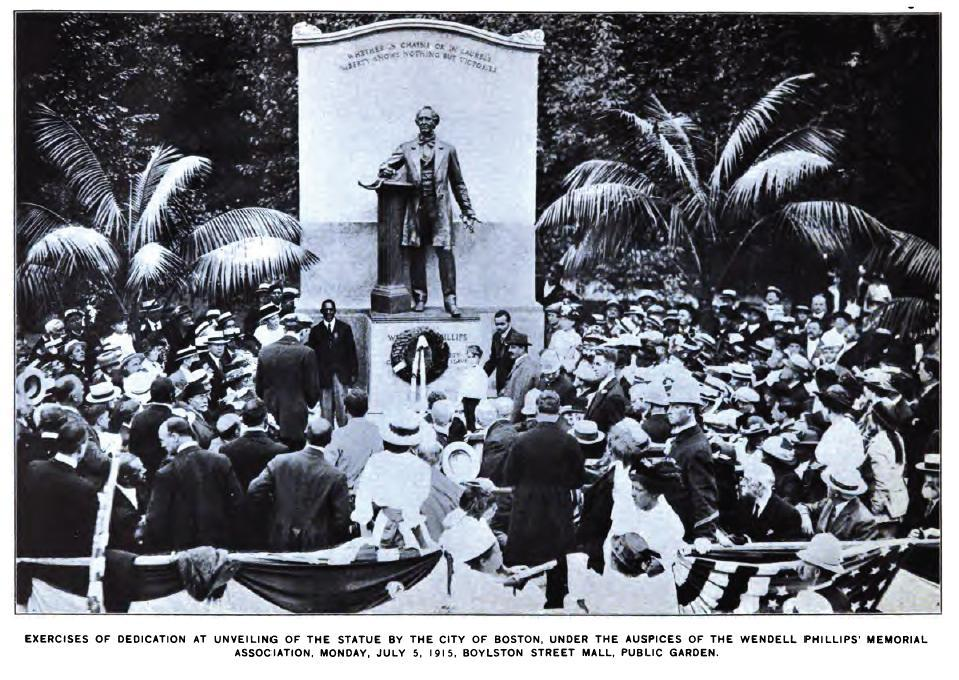
Dedication ceremony of the Wendell Phillips Monument in July 1915

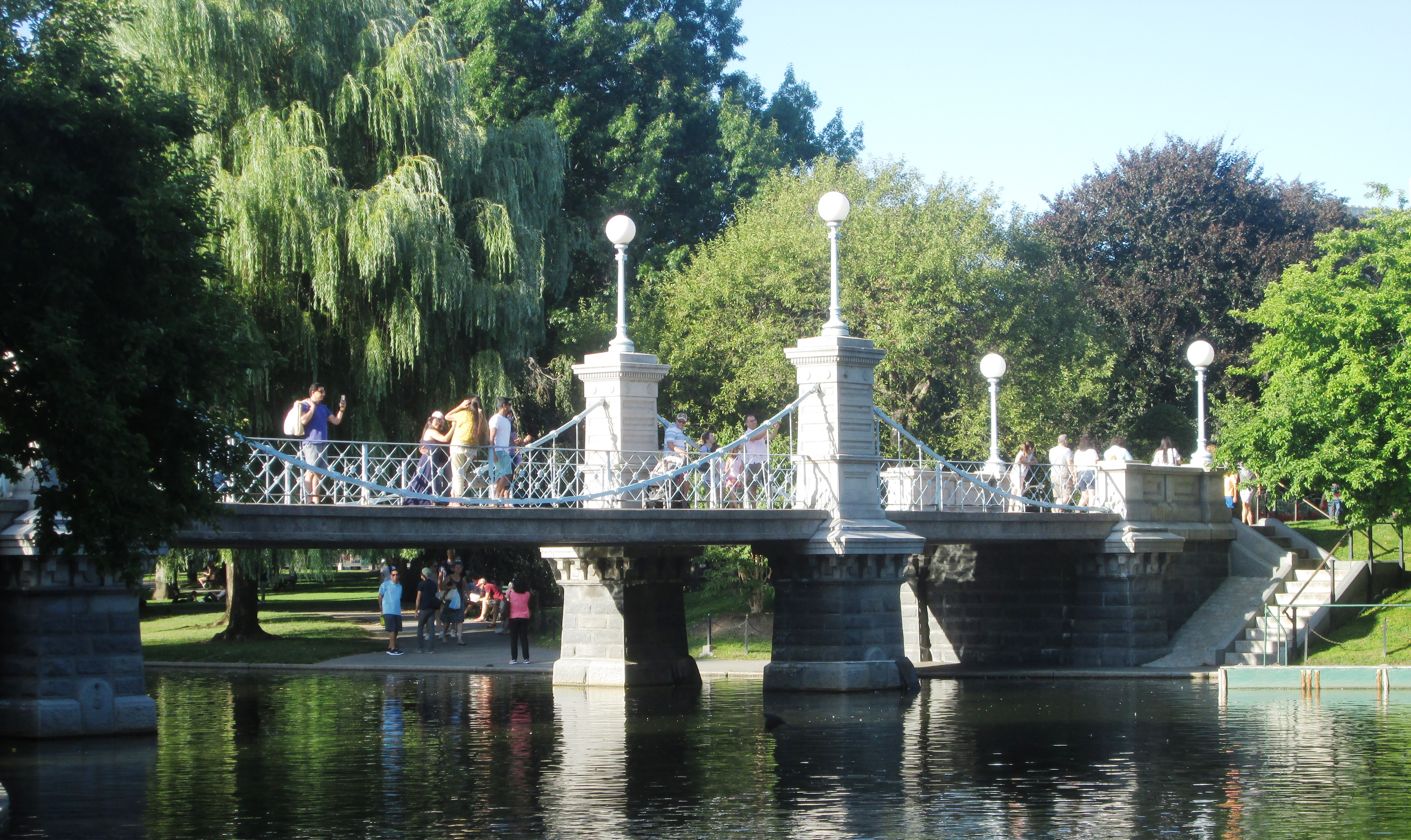
Lagoon bridge in the Boston Public Garden, 2017

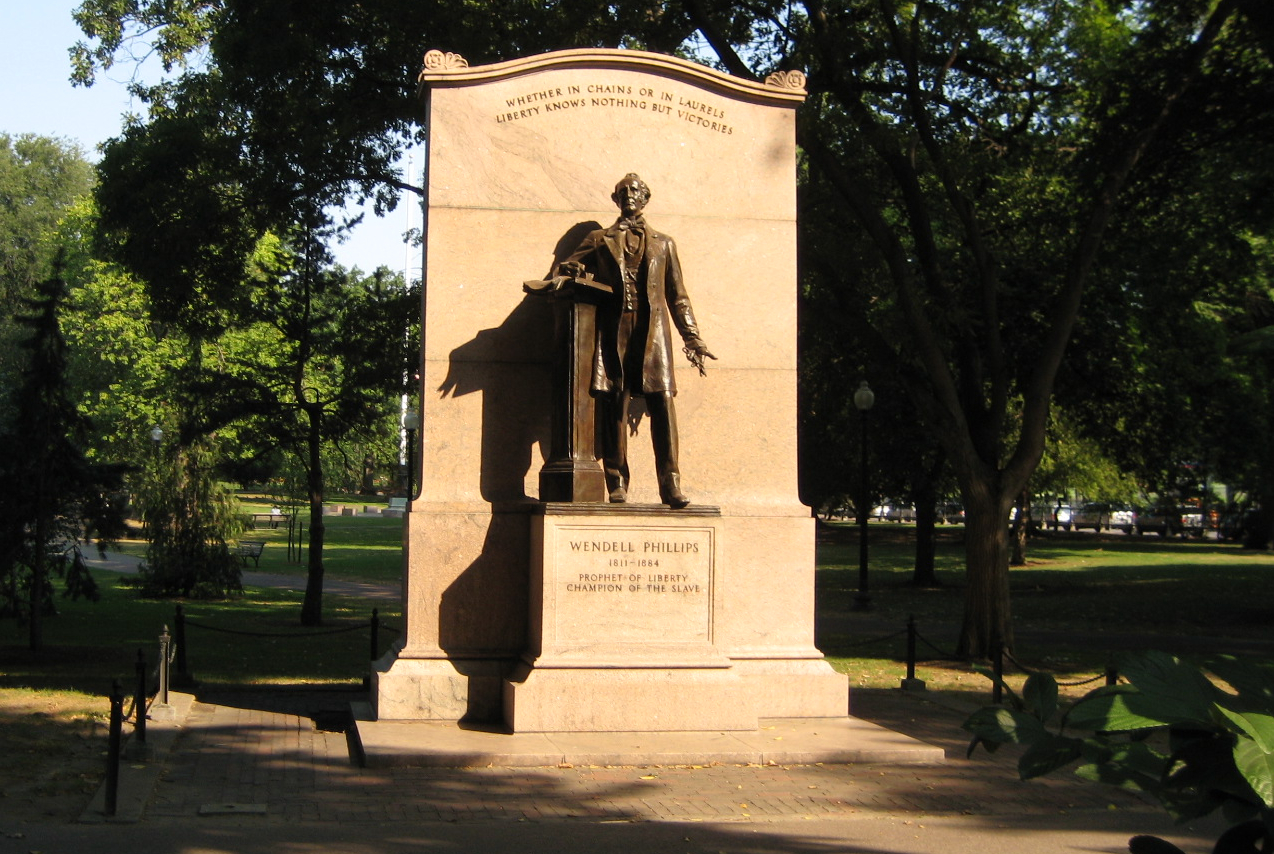
Memorial to Wendell Phillips, 2007

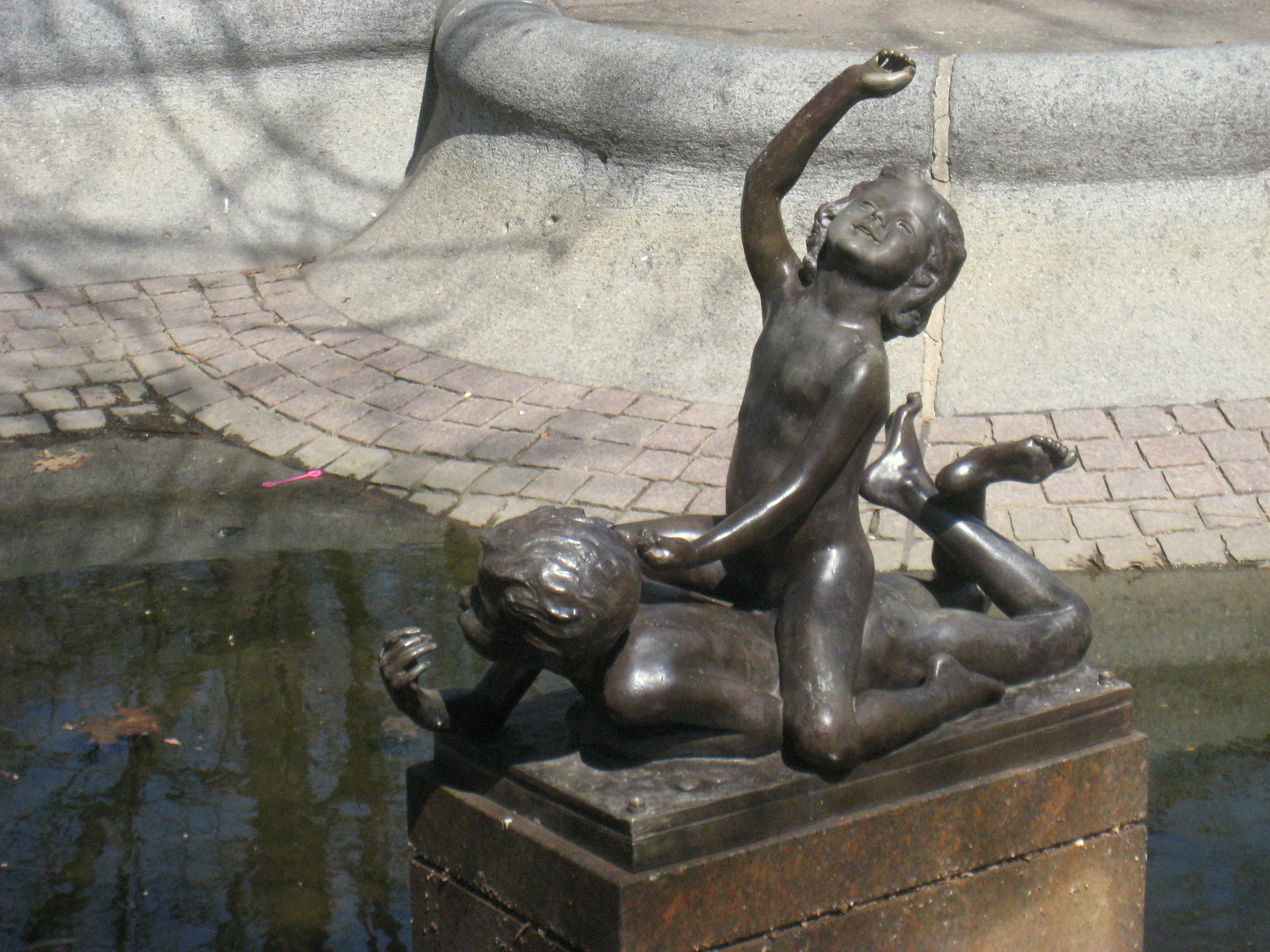
Triton Babies Fountain
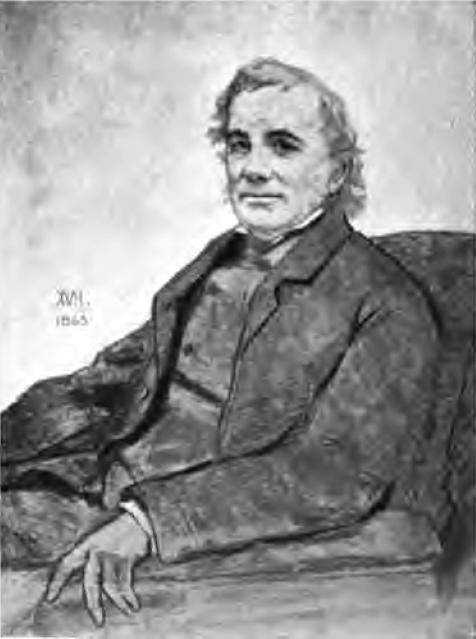
Horace Gray, father of the Boston Public Garden

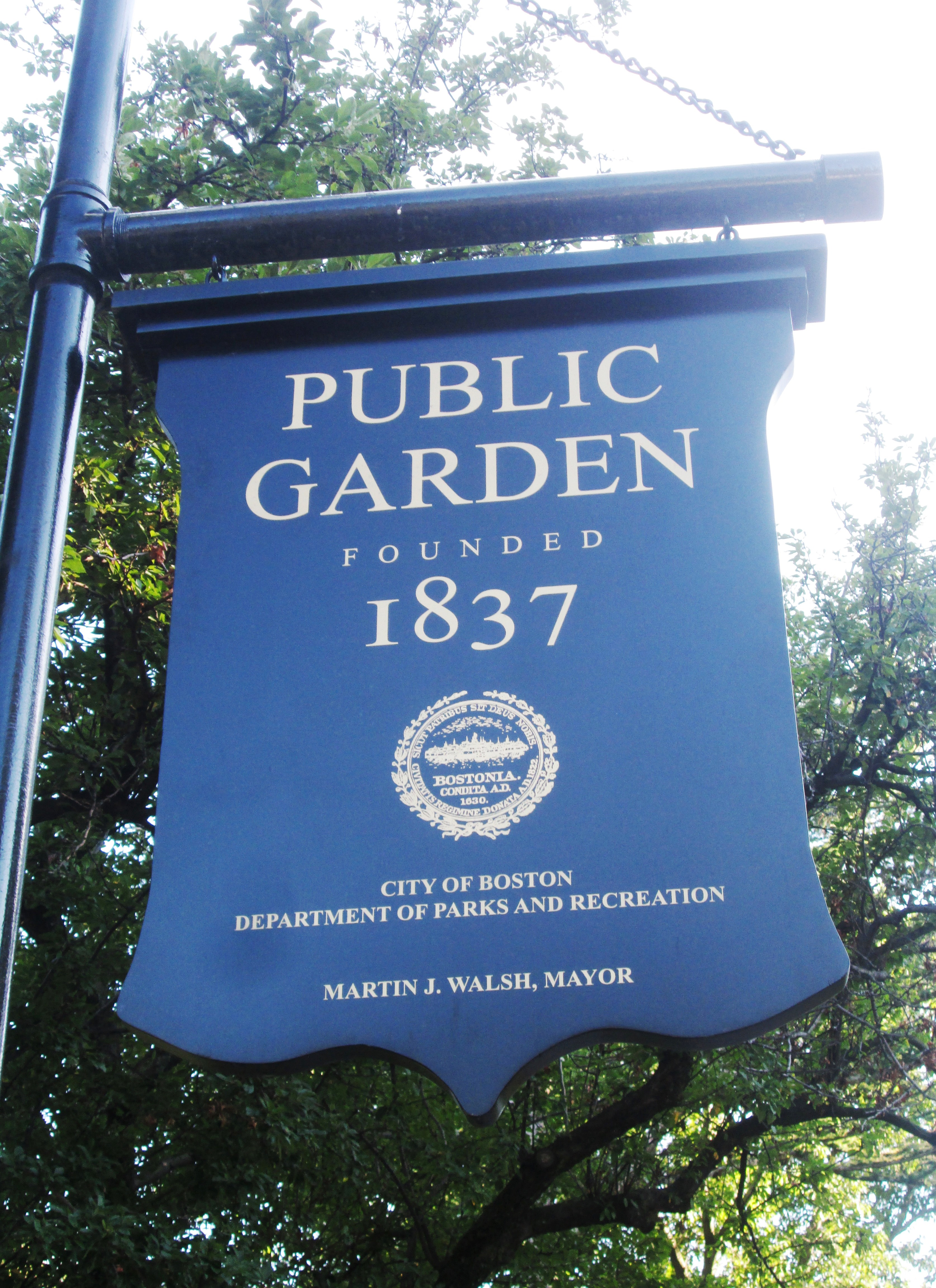
Entrance sign, 2017

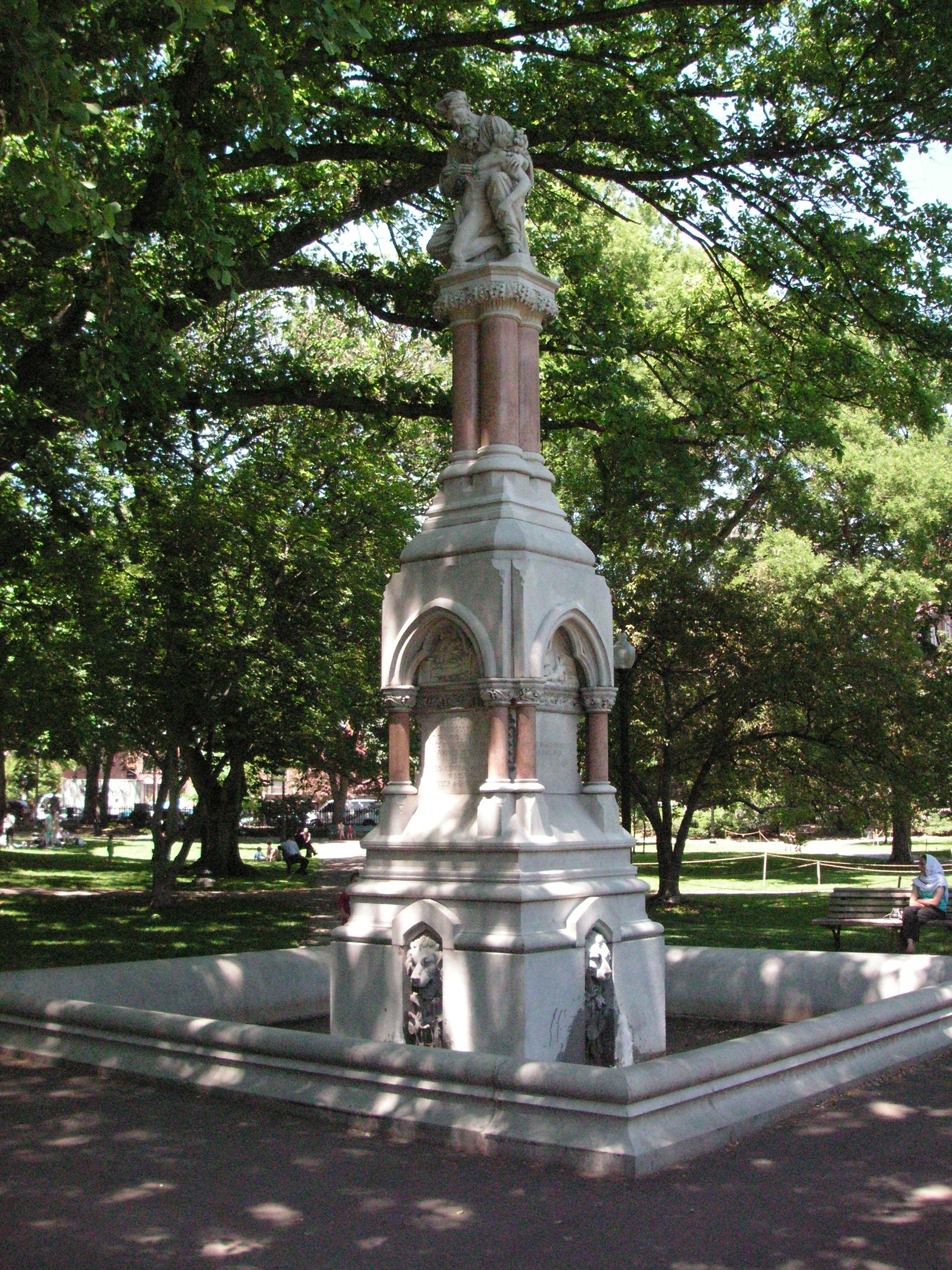
The Ether Monument by John Quincy Adams Ward, 2008

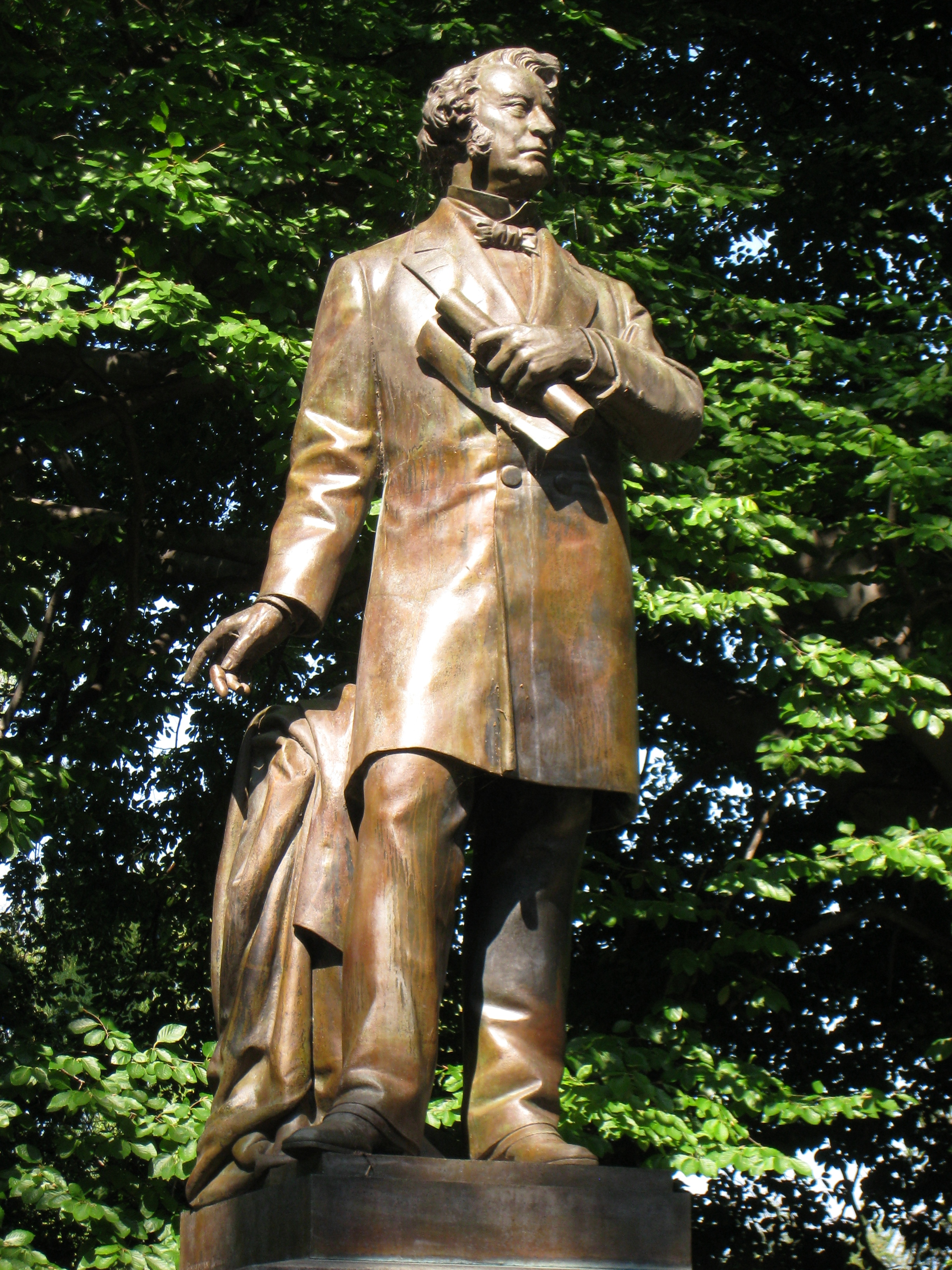
Statue of Charles Sumner

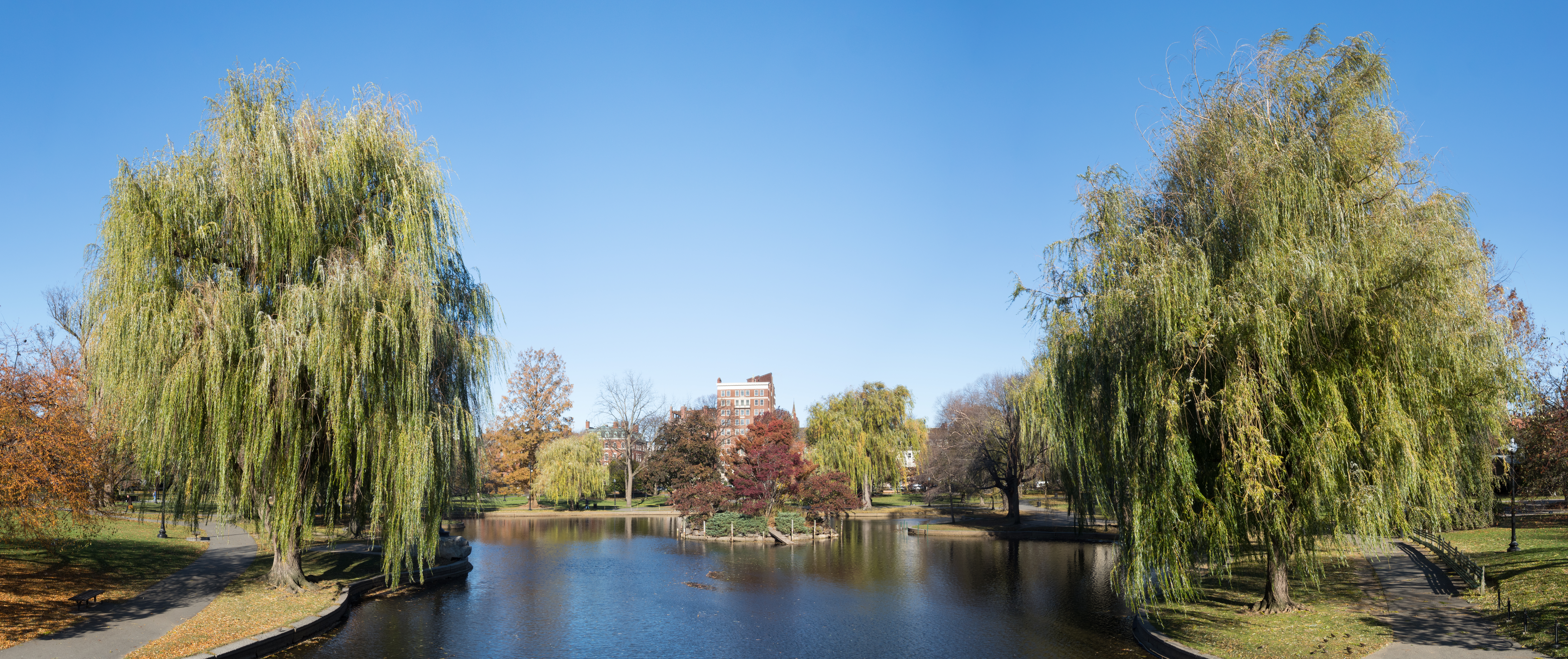
Public Garden in November 2019

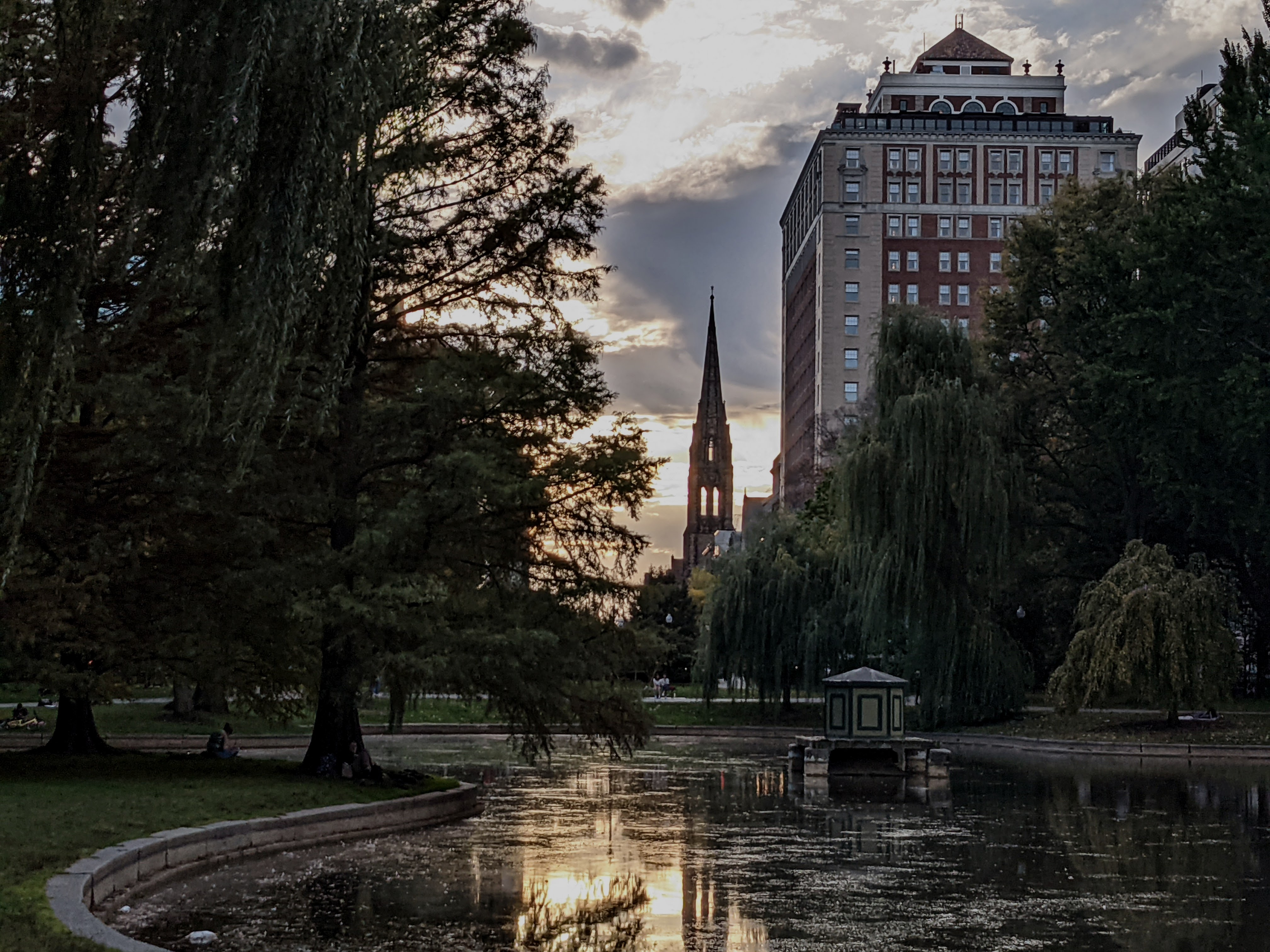
The swan pond at the Boston Public Garden with a view of the Arlington Street Church steeple.

== See also ==
- List of botanical gardens and arboretums in Massachusetts
- List of National Historic Landmarks in Boston
- National Register of Historic Places listings in northern Boston, Massachusetts
