= Japanese Lantern (Boston) =

Lantern sculpture in Boston, Massachusetts, U.S.

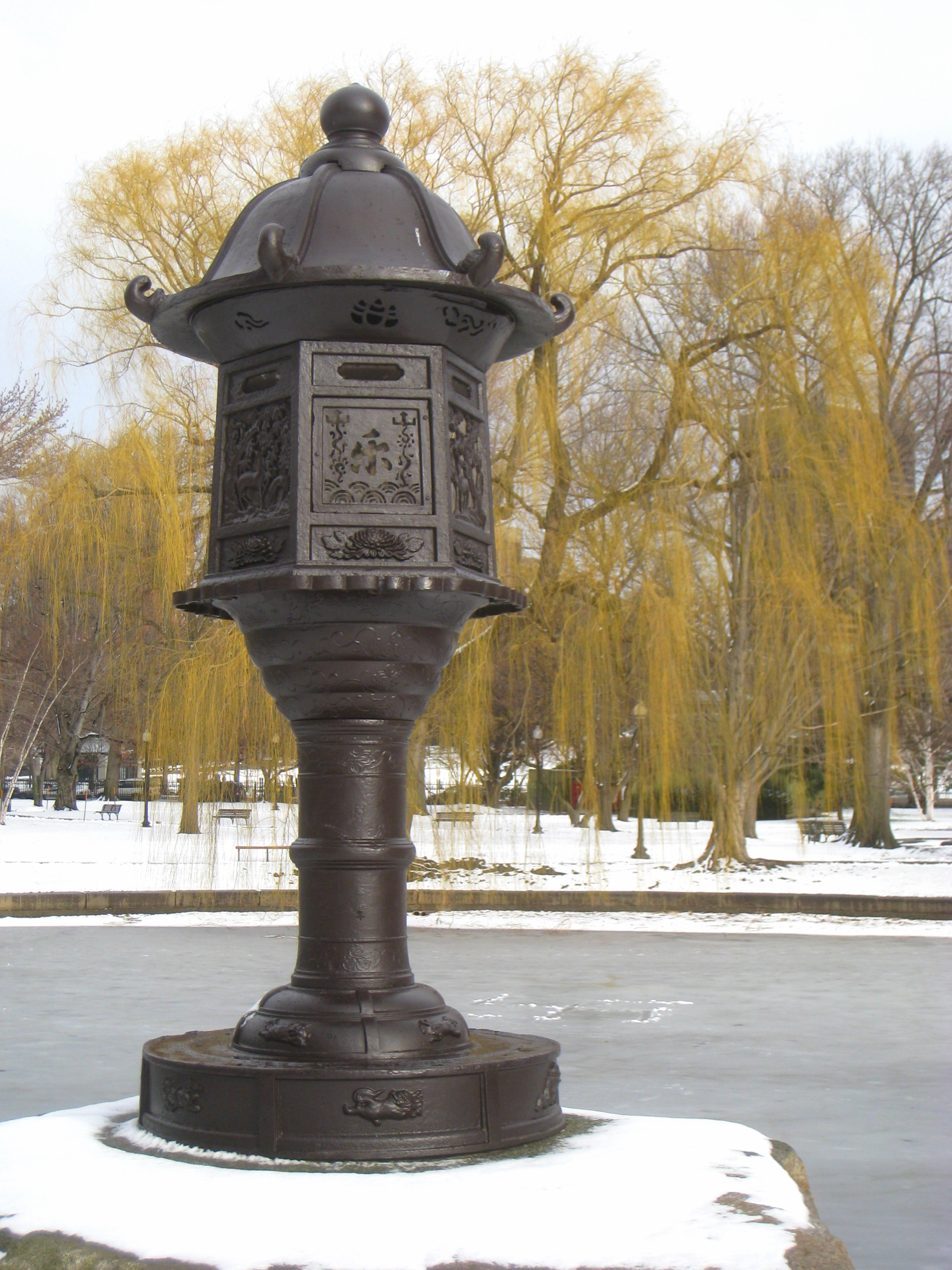
- The lantern in 2010
- Location: Boston, Massachusetts, U.S.
- 42.35439°N 71.07029°W

Japanese Lantern is a 1587 lantern sculpture, installed in Boston Public Garden, in Boston, MA, United States. The lantern was given to the city in 1904 by antiques dealer Bunkio Matsuki, who had been educated when he arrived in Salem MA by antiquarian Edward S. Morse.
