= Statue of Tadeusz Kościuszko (Boston) =

Statue in Boston, Massachusetts, U.S.

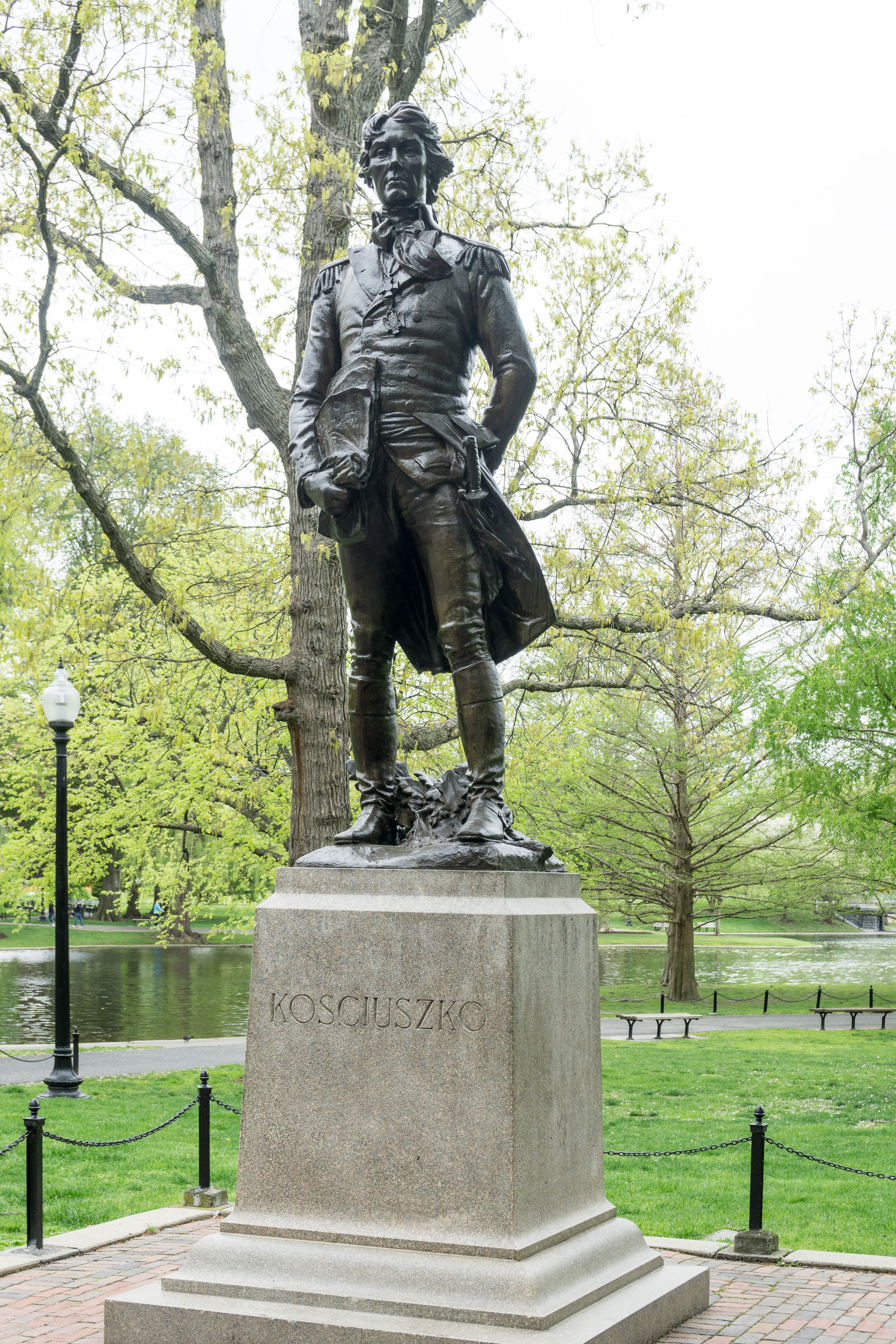
- The statue in 2017
- Artist: Theo Alice Ruggles Kitson
- Subject: Tadeusz Kościuszko
- Location: Boston, Massachusetts, U.S.; 42°21′9.2″N 71°4′8.7″W

A statue of Tadeusz Kościuszko by Theo Alice Ruggles Kitson is installed in Boston's Public Garden, in the U.S. state of Massachusetts.

== Description and history ==
The memorial was commissioned by the Polish people of New England on September 28, 1922. It was cast in 1927, and dedicated on September 28 of that year. The bronze sculpture of Kościuszko measures approximately 10 ft. x 32 in. x 27 in., and rests on a granite base that measures approximately 6 ft. x 6 ft. x 5 ft. 7 in. The work was surveyed as part of the Smithsonian Institution's "Save Outdoor Sculpture!" program in 1993.

== See also ==
- 1927 in art
