= Bagheera Fountain =

Fountain and sculpture in Boston, Massachusetts, U.S.

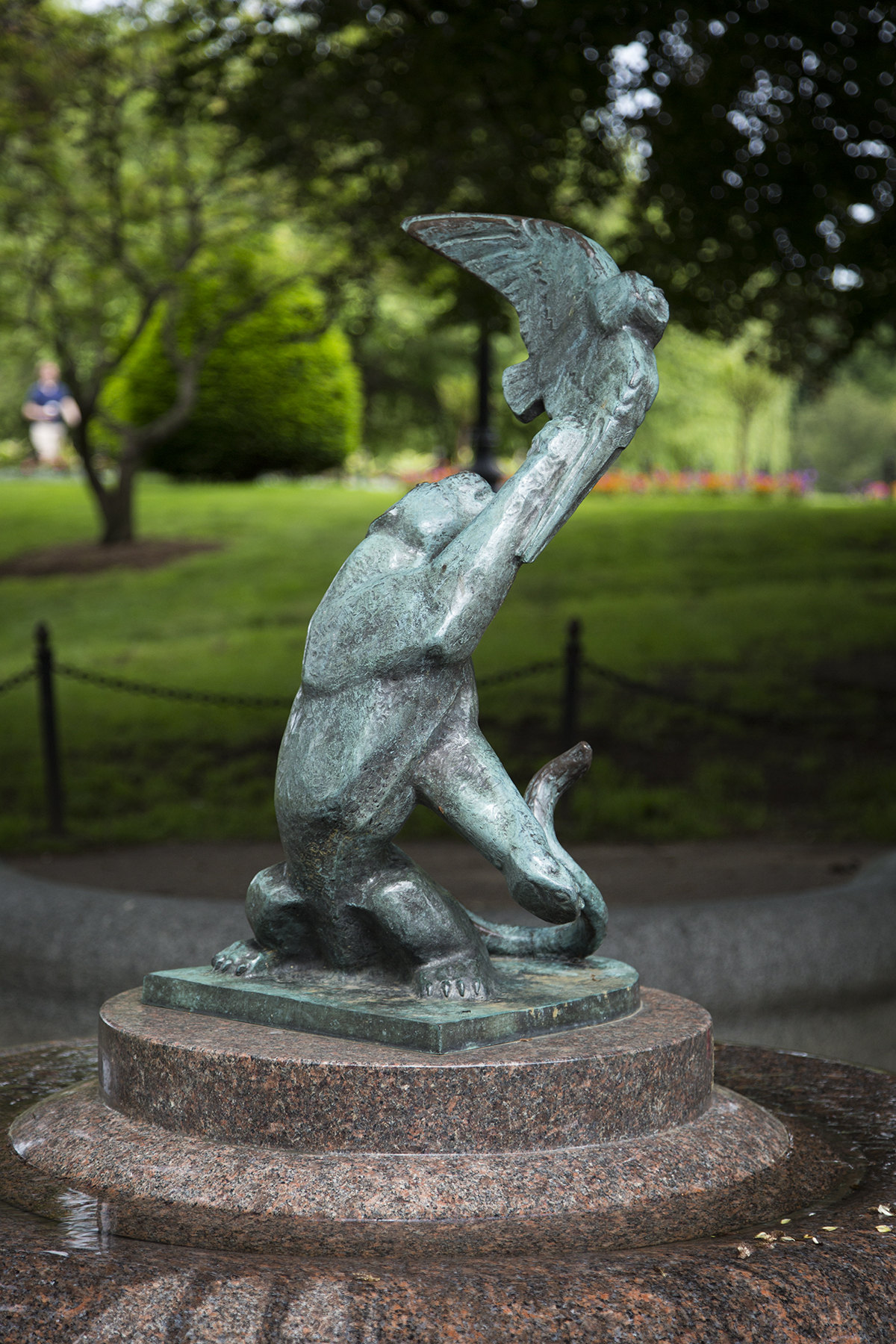
- The fountain in 2013
- Artist: Lilian Swann Saarinen
- Year: 1939
- Location: Boston, Massachusetts, U.S.; 42.354141°N 71.069134°W

Bagheera Fountain is a 1939 fountain by Lilian Swann Saarinen, installed in Boston's Public Garden, in the U.S. state of Massachusetts.

== Description and history ==
Inspired by Rudyard Kipling's The Jungle Book (1894), the fountain features a bronze sculpture of a mountain lion and owl, measuring approximately 32 x 16 x 16 in. The statue rests on a polished granite base that is approximately 57 in. tall and has a diameter of 60 in. The fountain was surveyed as part of the Smithsonian Institution's "Save Outdoor Sculpture!" program in 1993.

== See also ==
- 1939 in art
