= Triton Babies Fountain =

Fountain and sculpture in Boston, Massachusetts, U.S.

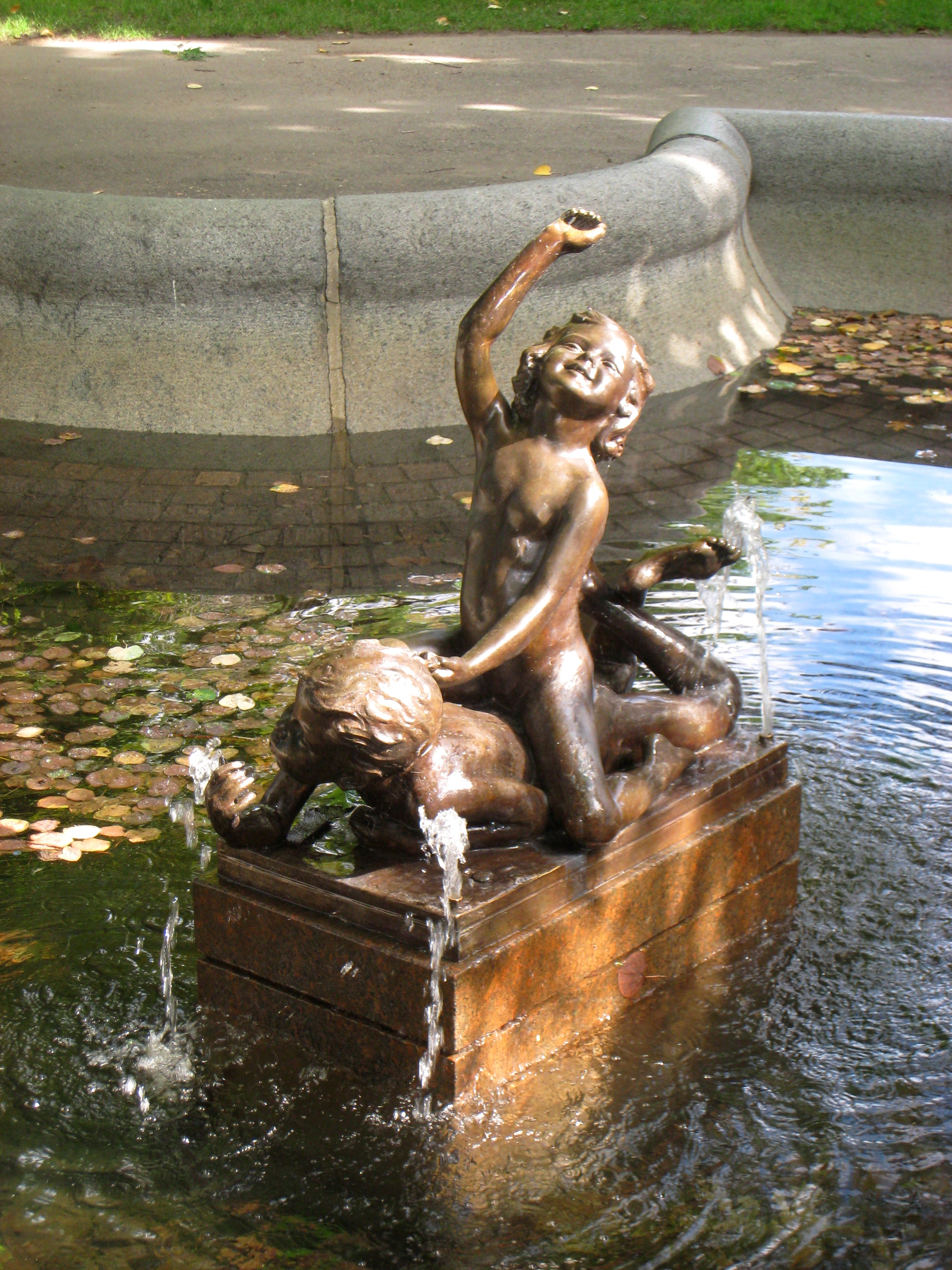
- The fountain in 2008
- Artist: Anna Coleman Ladd
- Year: 1922
- Location: Boston, Massachusetts, U.S.
- 42°21′16.8″N 71°4′10.1″W

Triton Babies Fountain is a fountain and sculpture by Anna Coleman Ladd, installed in Boston's Public Garden, in the U.S. state of Massachusetts. It features a bronze sculpture, cast in 1922, that depicts a boy and girl and measures approximately 2 ft. 3 in. x 19 in. x 39 in. The statue rests on a granite base measuring approximately 2 ft. 6 in. x 18 in. x 31 in. The work was surveyed as part of the Smithsonian Institution's "Save Outdoor Sculpture!" program in 1993.

A contemporary news item refers to the sculpture, a gift from Mrs. Boylston Beal, as "two Cupids, about life size".
