= Marvin E. Goody Memorial =

Memorial in Boston, Massachusetts, U.S.

- Interactive map of Marvin E. Goody Memorial
- Location: Public Garden, Boston, Massachusetts
- Coordinates: 42.353613°N 71.068602°W
- Designer: Joan Goody
- Type: Memorial
- Material: Red granite and Dakota mahogany
- Dedicated date: 1984
- Dedicated to: Marvin E. Goody

The Marvin E. Goody Memorial by Joan Goody is installed in Boston's Public Garden, in the U.S. state of Massachusetts. The red granite and Dakota mahogany memorial was dedicated in 1984, having been funded by Friends of the Public Garden and Common. It was surveyed as part of the Smithsonian Institution's "Save Outdoor Sculpture!" program in 1993.
