= Small Child Fountain =

Fountain and sculpture in Boston, Massachusetts, U.S.

- Baby Fountain
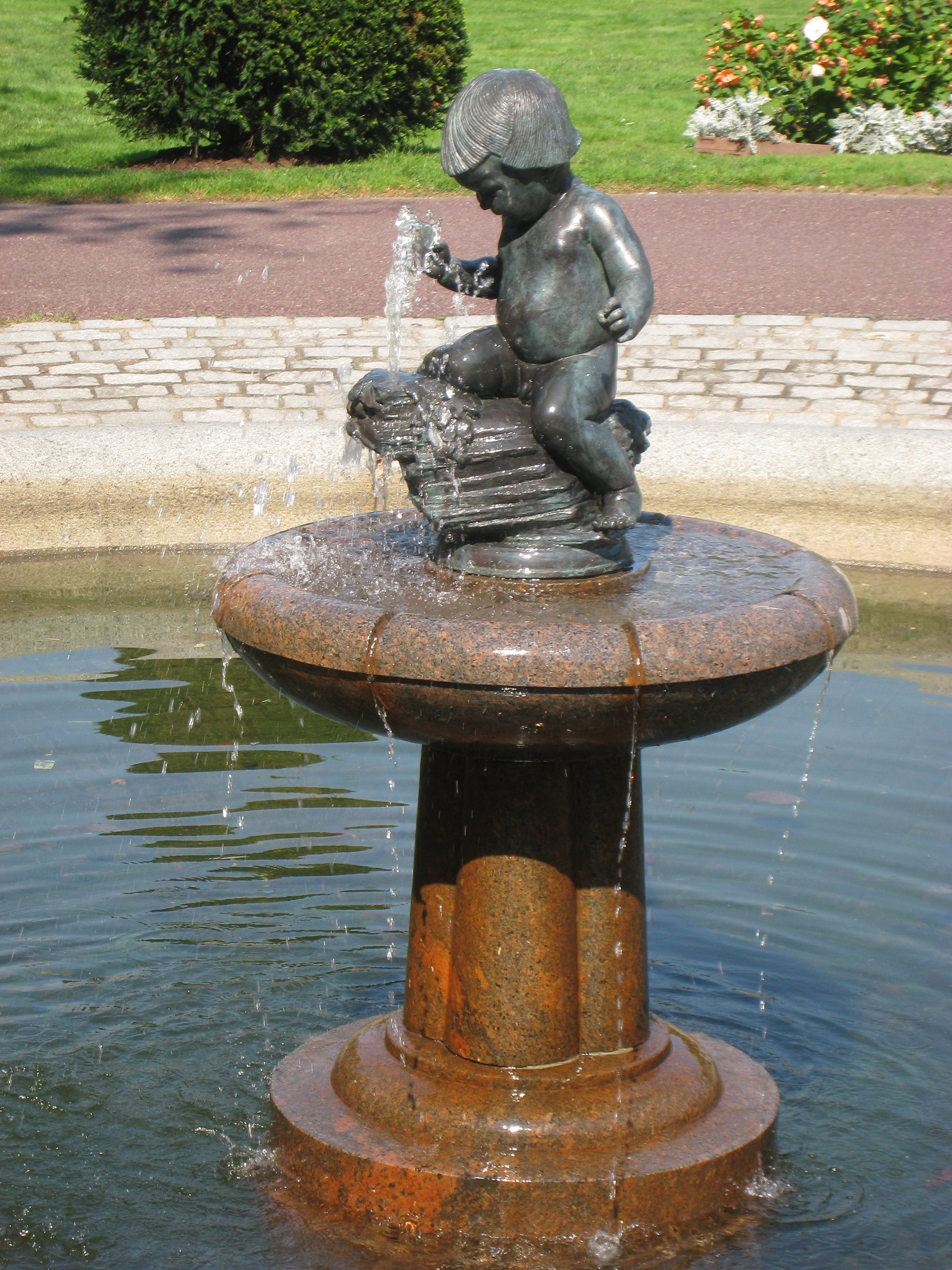
- The fountain in 2008
- Artist: Mary E. Moore
- Year: 1929
- Location: Boston, Massachusetts, U.S.
- 42°21′14″N 71°4′16.8″W

Small Child Fountain, also known as Baby Fountain, is a fountain and sculpture by Mary E. Moore, installed in Boston's Public Garden, in the U.S. state of Massachusetts. The fountain features a bronze sculpture of a nude boy, cast in 1929, that measure approximately 2 ft. 4 in. x 21 in. x 17 in. It rests on a granite base. The work was surveyed as part of the Smithsonian Institution's "Save Outdoor Sculpture!" program in 1993.
