= Statue of William Ellery Channing =

Statue in Boston, Massachusetts, U.S.

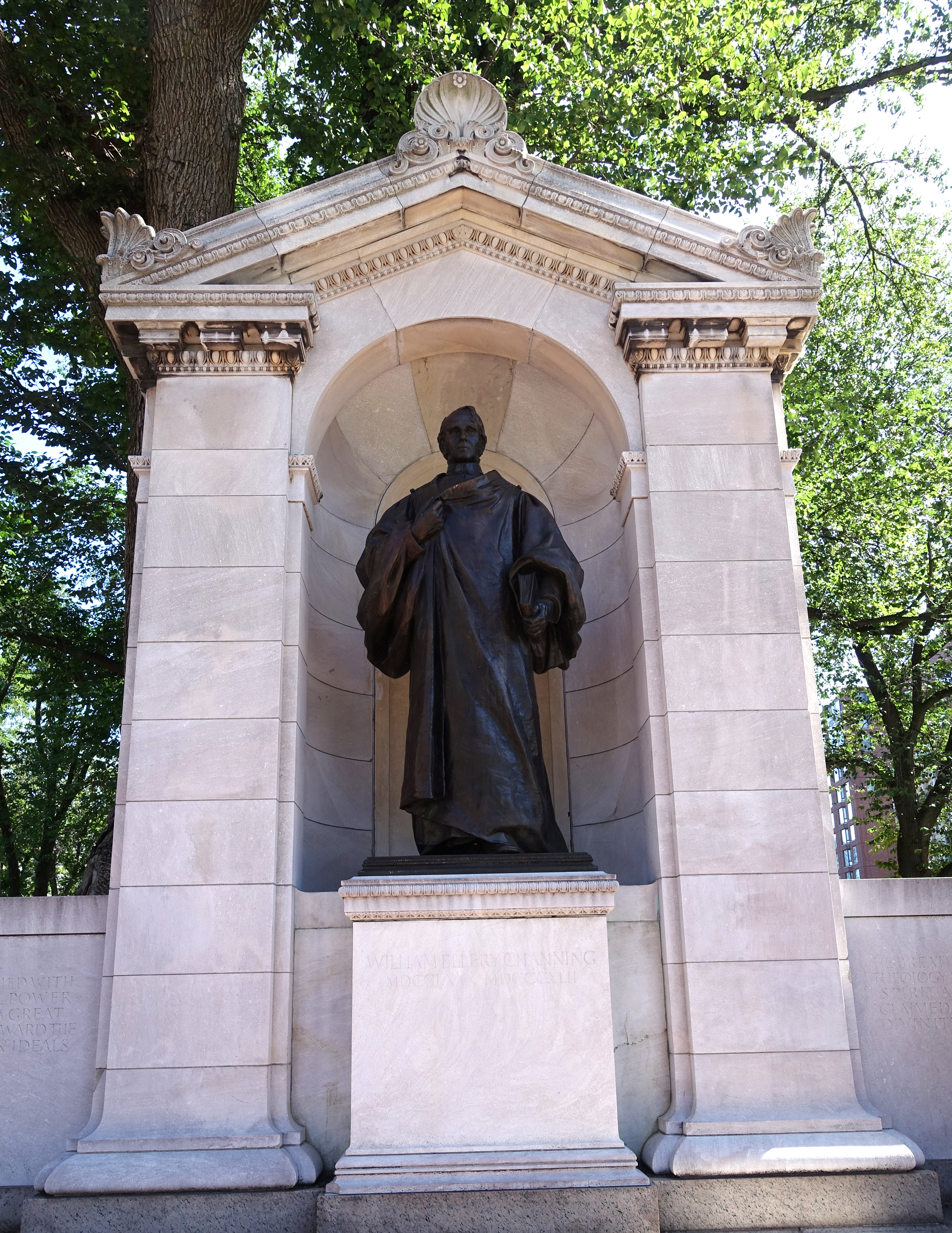
- The statue in 2014
- Subject: William Ellery Channing
- Location: Boston, Massachusetts, U.S.; 42.352189°N 71.070667°W

A statue of William Ellery Channing is installed near the intersection of Boylston and Arlington in Boston Public Garden, in Boston, Massachusetts, United States. The statue stands under a marble structure.
