= Boston Public Garden Foot Bridge =

Pedestrian bridge in Boston, Massachusetts, U.S.

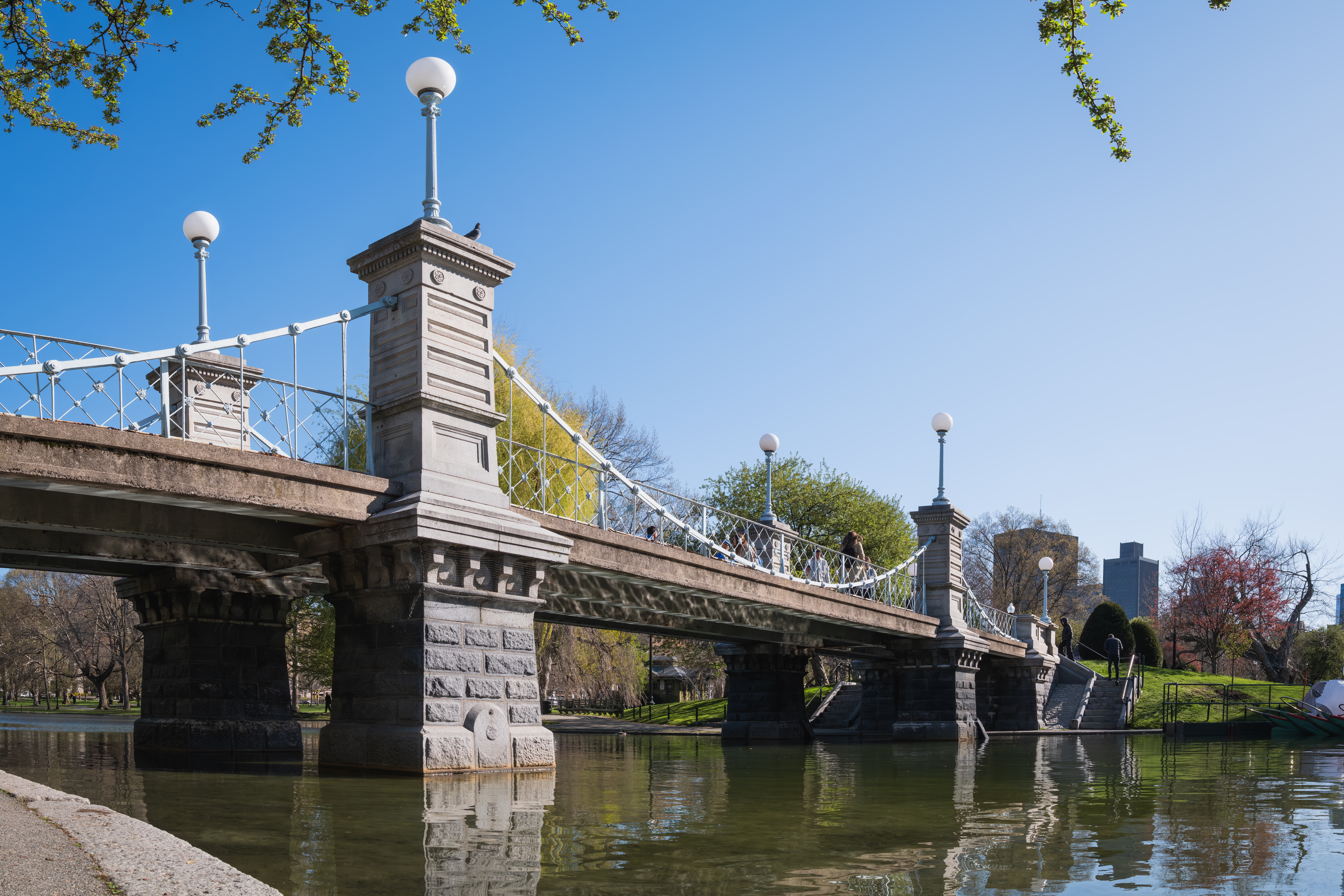
- The bridge in 2026
- Coordinates: 42.354127°N 71.069915°W
- Locale: Boston Public Garden

History
- Architect: William G. Preston
- Engineering design by: Clemens Herschel
- Opened: 1867

Location
- Interactive map of Boston Public Garden Foot Bridge

The Boston Public Garden Foot Bridge is a pedestrian bridge crossing the lagoon in Boston Public Garden, in Boston, Massachusetts, United States.

== Description and history ==
Built in 1867, it was the world's shortest functioning suspension bridge before its conversion to a girder bridge in 1921.

A plaque reads, "Public Garden / Foot Bridge / Opened June 1, 1867 / Designers / Clemens Herschel, Civil Engineer / 1842 - 1930 / William G. Preston, Architect / 1842 - 1910 / Tablet Placed June 1, 1936 / Boston Society of Civil Engineers".

The bridge is surrounded with "a horticultural effusion of specimen trees and carpet bedding (...) replacing a private effort to create a horticultural garden on the site of ropewalks that had been destroyed by fire".

The route of the Swan Boats passes under the bridge.

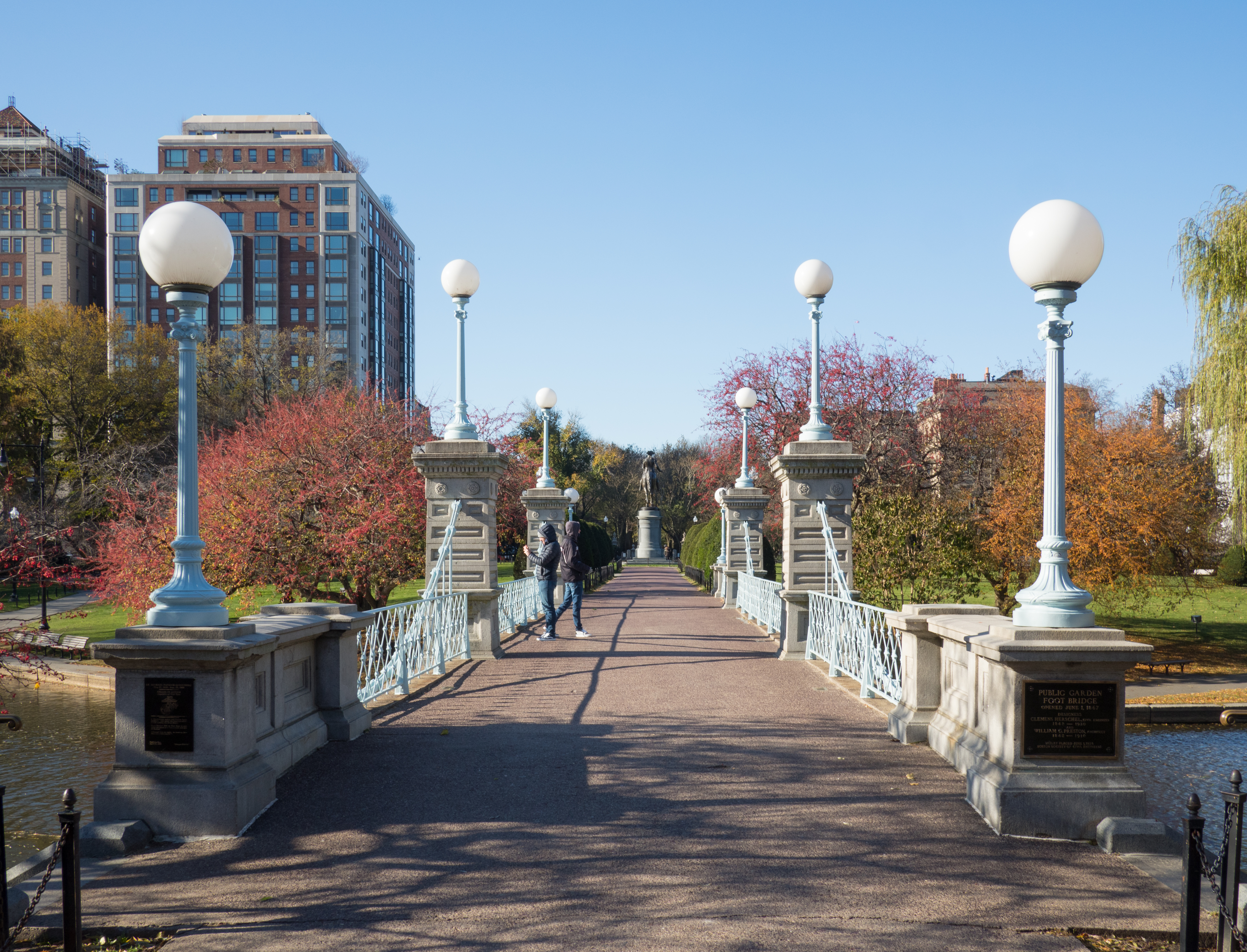
The bridge, 2019

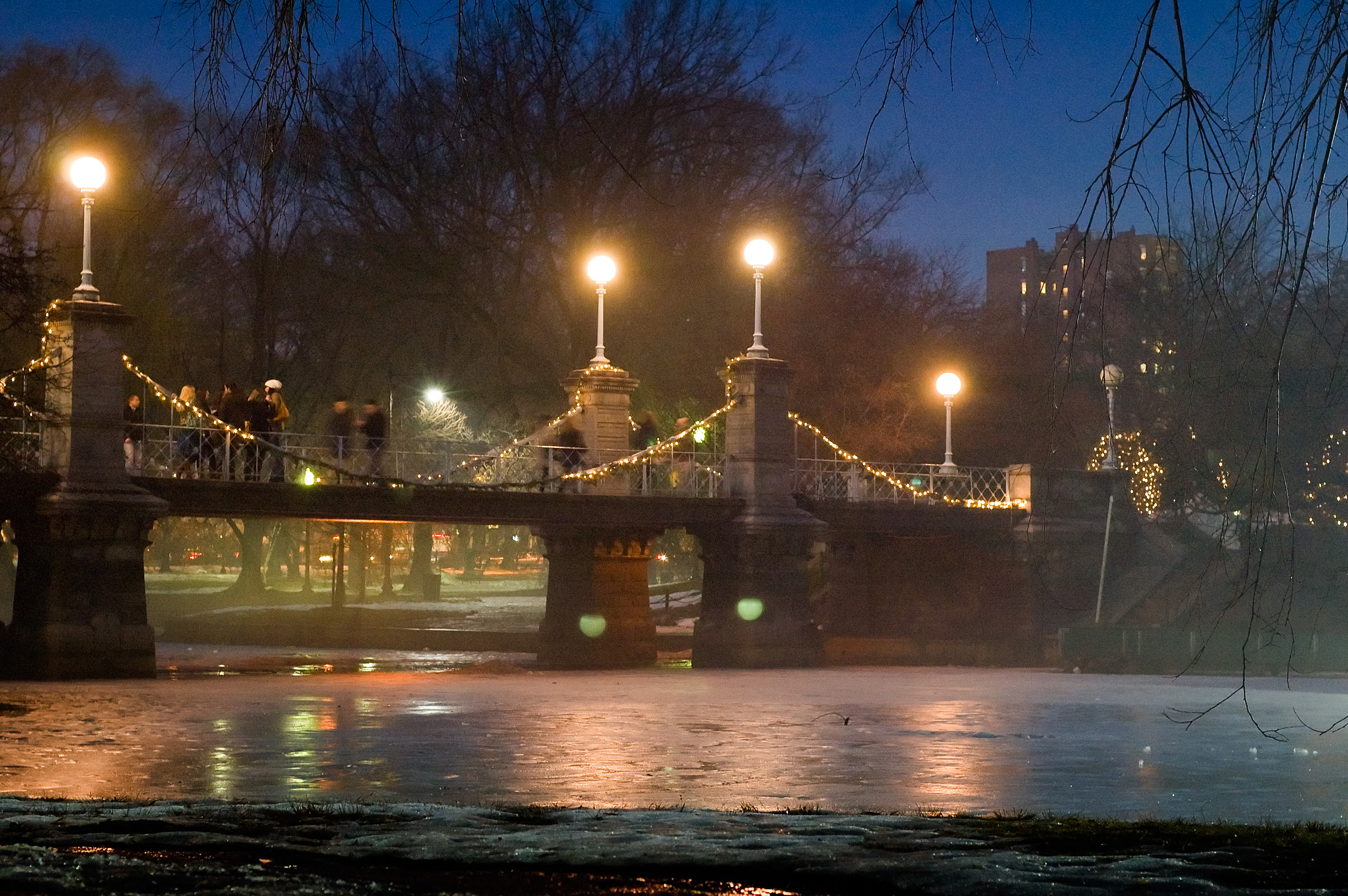
The bridge at night, 2007

== See also ==
- List of bridges documented by the Historic American Engineering Record in Massachusetts
