= Boston Public Garden 9/11 Memorial =

Memorial in Boston, Massachusetts, U.S.

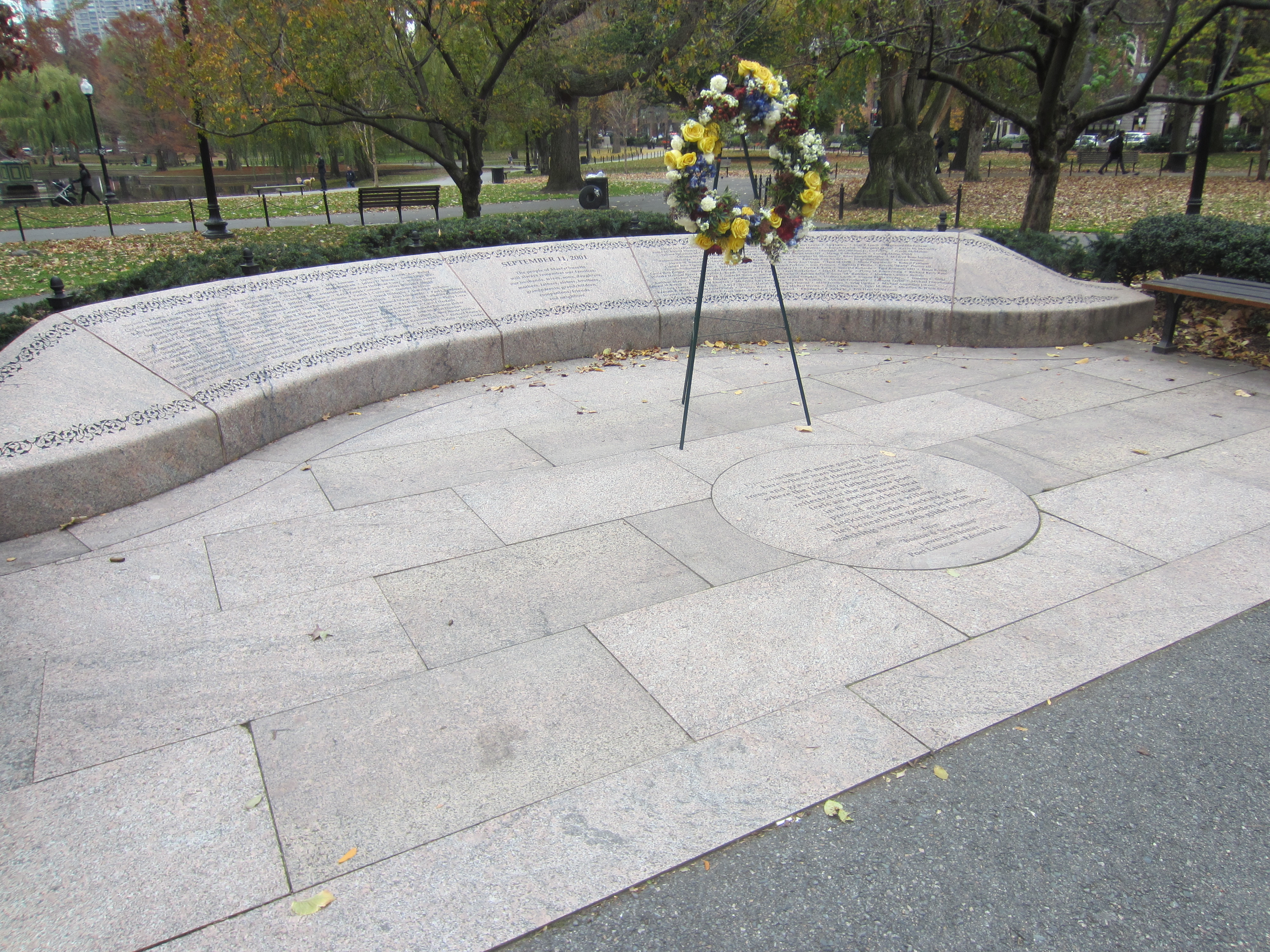
- The memorial in 2019
- Interactive map of Boston Public Garden 9/11 Memorial
- Location: Boston Public Garden
- Coordinates: 42.35273°N 71.07078°W
- Type: Memorial
- Dedicated to: Victims of the September 11 attacks
- Website: Boston Public Garden Memorial

A memorial commemorating victims of the September 11 attacks, known as the 9/11 Memorial or Garden of Remembrance, is installed in Boston Public Garden, in Boston, Massachusetts, United States.

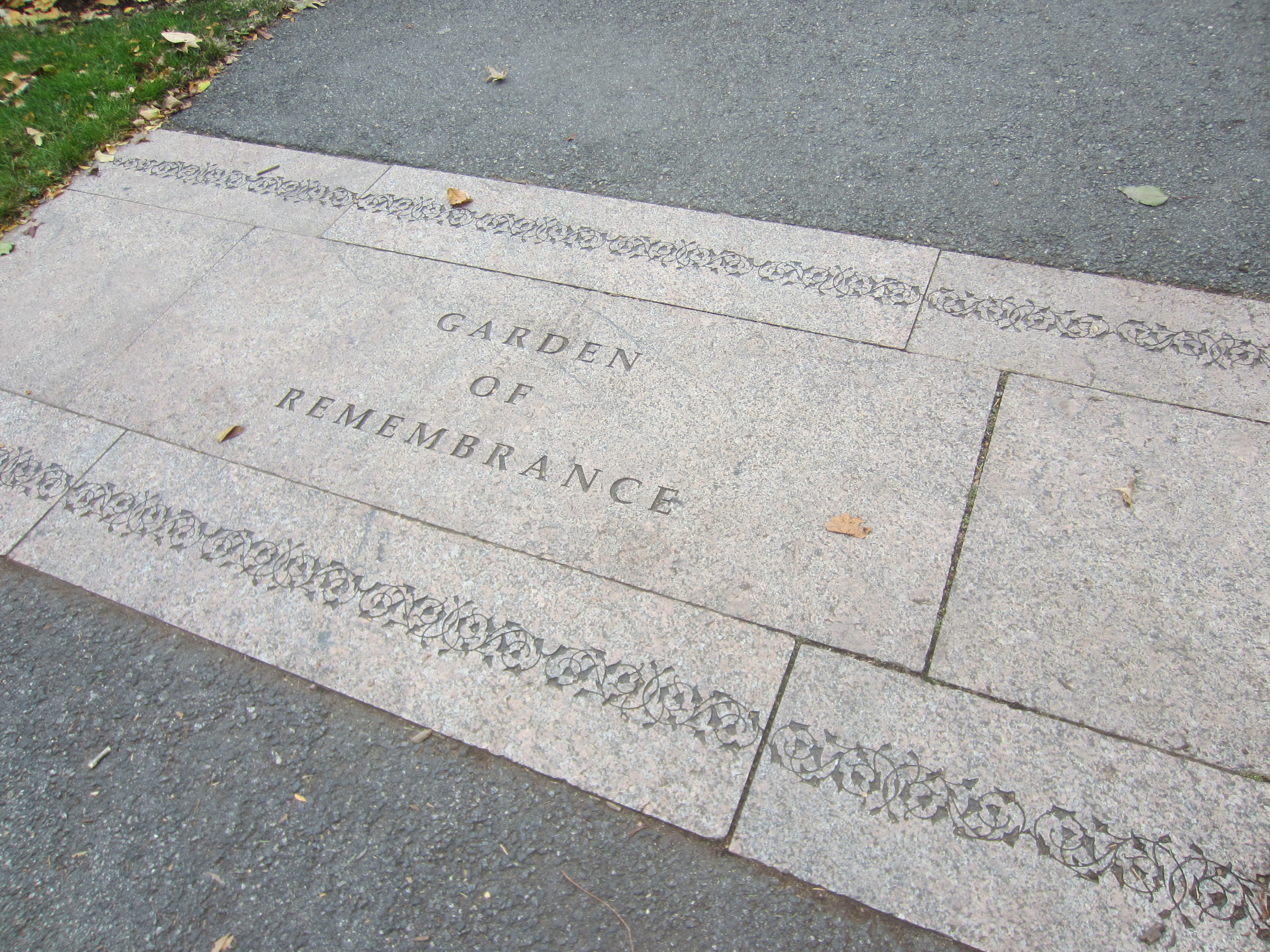
"Garden of Remembrance"

== See also ==
- Memorials and services for the September 11 attacks
