= Boy and Bird Fountain =

Fountain and sculpture in Boston, Massachusetts, U.S.

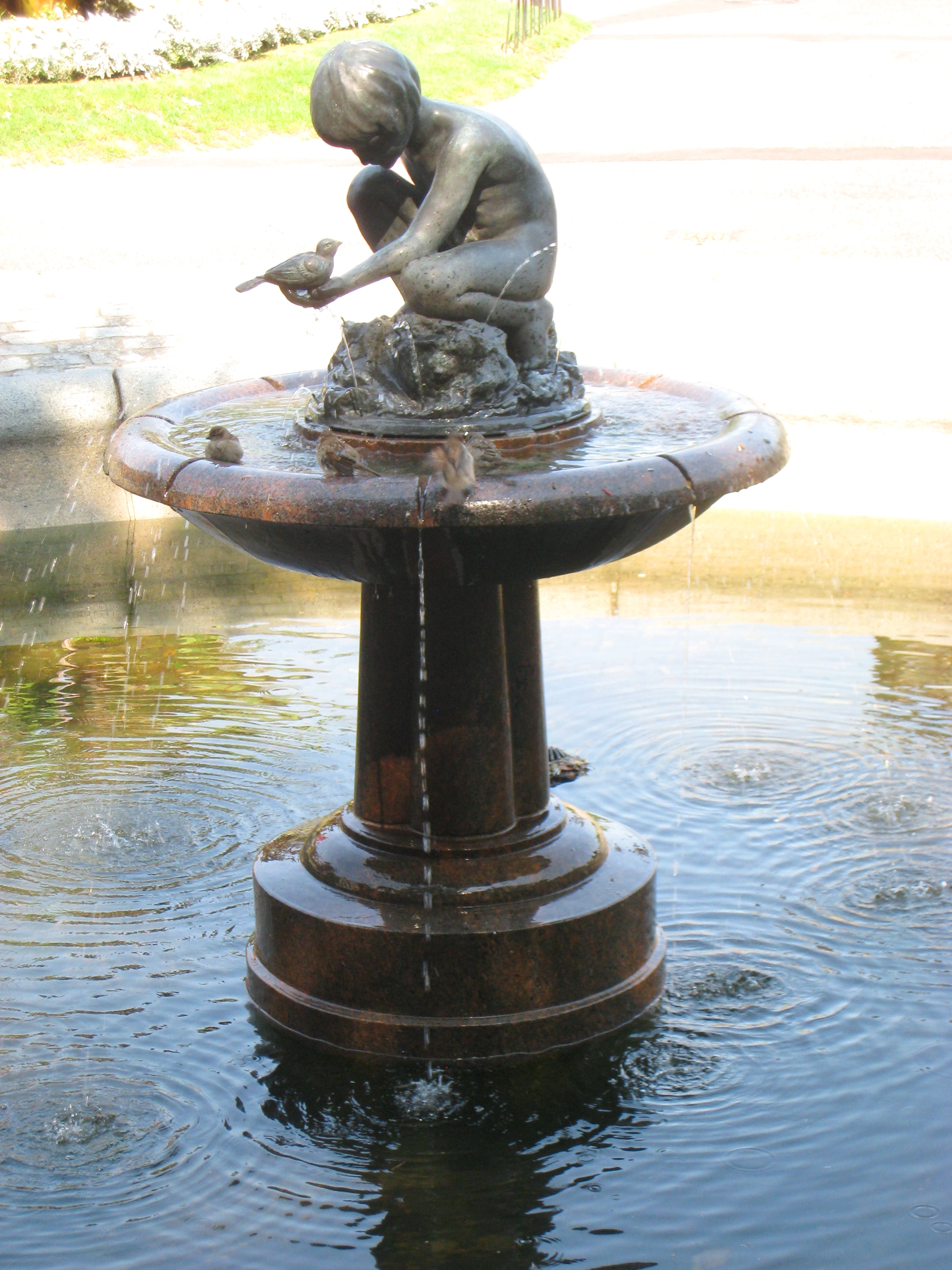
- The fountain in 2008
- Location: Boston, Massachusetts, U.S.
- 42.353633°N 71.071211°W

The Boy and Bird Fountain by Bashka Paeff is installed in Boston's Public Garden, in the U.S. state of Massachusetts. The original fountain was cast in 1934, then later recast in 1977 and 1992. It features a bronze sculpture of a nude boy holding a bird, resting on a granite base. The work was surveyed as part of the Smithsonian Institution's "Save Outdoor Sculpture!" program in 1993.
