= Tripartite Indenture of 1856 =

Development plan for Boston's Back Bay

The Tripartite Indenture of 1856 was an agreement between the Commonwealth of Massachusetts, the City of Boston, and the Boston Water Power Company signed December 11, 1856. The agreement settled the plan for the development of Boston's Back Bay, then a tidal flat.

The compromise is particularly significant because the decisions of the parties have had lasting impacts today. As part of the agreement, land was set aside for specific purposes, including the parks and public institutions that are now a part of Back Bay. It also heavily influenced the grid-and-alleyway system that is today part of the Commonwealth Avenue neighborhood. Now established as a residential-only district.
