= List of public art in Boston =

List of public artworks in Boston, Massachusetts, U.S.

This list features two sortable tables of art works on permanent public display in Boston, Massachusetts and its neighborhoods

It comprises works of public art, including sculpture, relief panels, tablets and fountains with sculptural features, accessible in an outdoor public spaces or inside state or federally owned public buildings. This does not include artwork visible inside museums or visible only on private property.

This table is not complete and most likely will not include recent installations. Please feel welcome to contribute/add these in the Additional Artworks area below.

== Usage ==
The tables' columns (except for note, Type and Image) are sortable by pressing the arrows symbols. The following gives an overview of what information is included in the table.

- Name: The artwork's commonly used name or name as it has been entered on its Wikipedia page (where it has one)
- Artist: name of the primary artist(s) or designer(s) if known.
- Year: variously the artwork's installation date; date of creation; or date of reinstallation at its current location
- Location: the street, park, intersection or plaza where the artwork is currently located
- Material: the main material(s) from which the artwork is constructed
- Dimensions: the approximate dimensions of the artwork, where known
- Notes: additional information, including ownership or known repairwork
- Image: a picture of the artwork, where available

This page seeks to be an aggregate list of general facts. For information on individual sculptures, please visit the individual artwork's pages.

== Artworks ==
=== City of Boston ===
Includes: Back Bay, Boston, North End, South End, Boston

Name	Artist	Year	Location	Material	Dimensions	Notes	Image
A. Philip Randolph	Tina Allen	1988	Back Bay station	bronze	height: 9 feet (2.7 meters)		
The Embrace	Hank Willis Thomas and MASS Design Group	2023	Boston Common	bronze	height: 6.7 m (22 ft)		
George Thorndike Angell Memorial	Peabody & Stearns	1912	Post Office Square, Boston Angell Memorial Plaza	terrazzo; gilded copper; steel.	h. 60 ft. x W. 10 ft.		
Appeal to the Great Spirit	Cyrus Edwin Dallin	1908	Boston Museum of Fine Arts	bronze	sculpture: 290 cm × 250 cm × 300 cm (114" × 100" × 120")	Boston Museum of Fine Arts	
Aristides Statue			Louisburg Square		height: 1.8 m (6 ft)		
Army Nurses Memorial	Bela Pratt		Massachusetts State House		sculpture: 2.5 m (96")		
Red Auerbach Statue	Lloyd Lillie	1985	Quincy Market	bronze	5 ft. x 6 ft. x 2 ft. 3 in		
Bagheera Fountain	Lilian Swann Saarinen	1939	Boston Public Garden	bronze; granite	sculpture: 32" x 16" x 16" plinth: 57" high, 60" diameter.		
John Barry Tablet	John Francis Paramino	1949, 1977 copy	Boston Common	bronze; granite			
Beacon Hill Monument		1898 rebuilt	Massachusetts State House, Ashburton Park	granite; slate, Bronze			
Boston Common Tablet	R. Clipston Sturgis	1913	Boston Common	slate, granite	15 x 5 x 20 ft		
Boston Irish Famine Memorial	Robert Shure	1998	Washington Street and School Street plaza				
Boston Massacre Monument	Robert Kraus	1889	Boston Common	bronze; granite			
Boston Public Garden Flagpole Base	William D. Austen	1921	Boston Public Garden	bronze; granite	sculpture: 6 x 4 x 4 ft plinth: 3.5 x 7 x 7 ft.		
Boston Women's Memorial	Meredith Bergmann	2003	Commonwealth Avenue Mall	bronze; granite			
Boy and Bird Fountain	Bashka Paeff	1934, recast 1977, 1992	Boston Public Garden	bronze			
Brewer Fountain	Michel Joseph Napoléon Liénard	1868	Park Street and Tremont Street corner	bronze; granite	height: 22 ft (6.7 m)		
Phillips Brooks Statue	Augustus Saint-Gaudens; Frances Grimes	1910	Copley Square	bronze; granite; marble			
Robert Burns Statue	Henry Hudson Kitson	1920, relocated 1975	Back Bay Fens	bronze; granite	sculpture: 108" x 60"x 60" plinth: 56" x 48" x 62"		
Thomas Cass Statue	Richard E. Brooks	1899	Boston Public Garden	bronze; granite (red beach Maine)	sculpture: 8 ft. x 2 ft. 4 in. x 2 ft. 4 in. plinth: 6 ft. 6 in. x 3 ft. 8 in. x 3 ft. 8 in		
William Ellery Channing Statue	Herbert Adams	1903	Boston Public Garden, exterior wall	bronze; granite (Milford); marble	sculpture: 8 ft. 5 in. x 45 in. x 46 in. plinth: 25 ft. x 24 ft. x 86 in.		
Charlestown Civil War Memorial	Martin Milmore	1872	Winthrop Square	Granite			
China Trade Gate	David Judelson	1988	Chinatown (Beach Street)				
City Carpet	Lilli Ann Killen Rosenberg	1983	Old City Hall	Mosaic: ceramic; bronze; stone; brick; concrete			
Bust of Patrick Collins	Theo Alice Ruggles Kitson, Henry Hudson Kitson	1908	Commonwealth Avenue Mall	bronze; granite			
Christopher Columbus Statue, Beacon Hill		1850	Louisburg Square	marble			
Christopher Columbus Statue, North End	Andrew J. Mazzola	1979	Christopher Columbus Waterfront Park	marble; granite			
John Singleton Copley Statue	Lewis Cohen	2002	Copley Square	bronze			
James Michael Curley Statues	Lloyd Lillie	1980	Faneuil Hall	bronze			
Edwin Upton Curtis Memorial		1924	Charles River Esplanade				
Bust of Richard Cushing	James Rosati	1980-1	Cardinal Cushing Memorial Park	Bronze; Granite (red)			
Declaration of Independence Tablet	John Francis Paramino	1925	Boston Common	bronze; granite			
Tony DeMarco Statue	Harry Weber	2012	North End	bronze			
Democratic Donkey		1998 installed	Old City Hall	bronze			
Charles Devens Statue	Olin Levi Warner	1894	Charles River Esplanade	bronze; granite	sculpture: 7 x 3 x 3 ft plinth: 7 x 3 x 3 ft		
Dolphins of the Sea	Katharine Lane Weems	1977	New England Aquarium	bronze			
Mary Dyer Statue	Sylvia Shaw Judson	1959	Massachusetts State House	bronze; granite			
Echo of the Waves	Susumu Shingu	1981	New England Aquarium	painted steel; Teflon coated fiberglass			
Charles Eliot Memorial		1831	Charles River Esplanade	granite			
John Endecott Statue	C. Paul Jennewein	1936	Forsyth Park	granite (white, red)			
Leif Erikson Statue	Anne Whitney	1887	Commonwealth Avenue Mall	bronze; granite			
Ether Monument	William Robert Ware or John Quincy Adams Ward	1868	Boston Public Garden	granite	height: 12 m (40 ft)		
Edward Everett Statue	William Wetmore Story	1866	Richardson Park	bronze; granite	sculpture: 7 x 4 x 2.5 ft. plinth: 7 x 5.5 x 5.5 ft		
David Farragut Statue	Henry Hudson Kitson	1891	Marine Park	bronze; granite			
Arthur Fiedler Memorial	Ralph Helmick	1984	Charles River Esplanade	aluminum, granite			
Benjamin Franklin Statue	Richard Saltonstall Greenough; Thomas Ball	1856	Old City Hall		sculpture: 100" x 26". x 26" plinth: 111" x 90" x 90"		
The Founders Memorial	John Francis Paramino	1930	Boston Common	bronze; granite			
William Lloyd Garrison Statue	Olin Levi Warner	1886	Commonwealth Avenue Mall	bronze; granite (Quincy)	sculpture: 7 ft. x 4 ft. x 6 ft. 4 in. plinth: 4 ft. 9 in. x 4 ft. x 6 ft. 4 in.		
John Glover Statue	Martin Milmore	1875	Commonwealth Avenue Mall	bronze; granite	sculpture: 8 ft. x 3 ft. 6 in. x 3 ft. 6 in plinth: 6 ft. 6 in. x 5 ft. 6 in. x 5 ft. 6 in.		
Marvin E. Goody Memorial	Joan Goody	1984	Boston Public Garden	granite (red, Dakota mahogany)			
Edward Everett Hale Statue	Bela Pratt	1913	Boston Public Garden	bronze; granite			
Alexander Hamilton Statue	William Rimmer	1865	Commonwealth Avenue Mall	granite	sculpture:10 ft. x 3 ft. 4 in. x 3 ft. 4 in.		
Harbor Fog	Ross Miller	2009	Rose Fitzgerald Kennedy Greenway	steel; bronze; granite; LED lights			
Joseph Hooker equestrian statue	Daniel Chester French; Edward Clark Potter	1903	Massachusetts State House, Ashburton Park	bronze; granite			
Hotel Vendome Fire Memorial	Ted Clausen; Peter White	1997	Commonwealth Avenue Mall	granite			
Hungarian Revolution Memorial	E. Gyuri Hollosy	1986	Liberty Square Park	bronze; granite; steel			
Anne Hutchinson Statue	Cyrus Edwin Dallin	1915	Massachusetts State House	bronze; granite	sculpture: 98" x 52" x 30" plinth: 78" x 66" x 48"		
Indian Hunter	Paul Manship		Museum of Fine Arts, Boston	bronze; granite		Museum of Fine Arts, Boston	
John F. Kennedy Statue	Isabel McIlvain	1990	Massachusetts State House	bronze; granite	sculpture: 8 ft. 2 in. x 3 ft. x 18 in. plinth: 27 x 72 x 87.5 in		
Tadeusz Kościuszko Statue	Theo Alice Ruggles Kitson	1927	Boston Public Garden	bronze; granite	sculpture: 10 ft. x 32 in. x 27 in plinth: 6 ft. x 6 ft. x 5 ft. 7 in.		
Japanese Lantern		1587	Boston Public Garden	granite		gifted to the city by Bunkio Matsuki in 1904	
Pope John Paul II Memorial	Frank Chalfant Gaylord, II	1981	Boston Common	granite	53 .5" x 32" x 8.25"		
Henry Cabot Lodge Statue	Raymond Averill Porter	1932	Massachusetts State House	bronze; granite	sculpture: 96 x 30 x 28 1/2 in., plinth: 73 x 56 x 53 1/2 in		
Lotta Fountain	Katharine Lane Weems; J. W. Ames and E. S. Dodge	1939	Charles River Esplanade	granite			
Make Way for Ducklings	Nancy Schön	1987	Boston Public Garden	bronze			
Horace Mann Statue	Emma Stebbins	1865	Massachusetts State House	bronze; granite			
Massachusetts Fallen Firefighters Memorial	Robert Shure	2007	Massachusetts State House, Ashburton Park	bronze; granite			
Massachusetts Law Enforcement Memorial	Michael Kenny	2004	Massachusetts State House, Ashburton Park	granite			
Samuel Eliot Morison Statue	Penelope Jencks	1982	Commonwealth Avenue Mall	bronze; granite			
New England Holocaust Memorial	Stanley Saitowitz	1995	Carmen Park	glass; steel			
A Once and Future Shoreline	Ross Miller	1996	Faneuil Hall, west side	granite		City of Boston	
Oneida Football Club Monument	Joseph Arthur Coletti	1925	Boston Common	marble	tablet: 198 cm x 76.2 cm x 17.78 cm		
John Boyle O'Reilly Memorial	Daniel Chester French	1896	Back Bay Fens	bronze; granite			
Bobby Orr Statue	Harry Weber	2010	TD Garden	bronze			
The Partisans	Andrzej Pitynski	1983	South Boston waterfront	aluminum			
George S. Patton Statue	James Earle Fraser	1953	Charles River Esplanade	bronze; granite			
Wendell Phillips Statue	Daniel Chester French	1915	Boston Public Garden	bronze; granite (Stony Creek pink)			
Poe Returning to Boston	Stefanie Rocknak	2014	Boylston Street and Charles Street, Edgar Allan Poe Square				
Josiah Quincy III Statue	Thomas Ball	1879	Old City Hall				
Paul Revere equestrian statue	Cyrus Edwin Dallin	1885, cast 1940	Paul Revere Mall	bronze; granite			
Bill Russell Statue	Ann Hirsch	2013	Boston City Hall Plaza	bronze			
Domingo Faustino Sarmiento Statue	Ivette Compagnion	1973	Commonwealth Avenue Mall	bronze; concrete	sculpture: 10 ft. x 4 ft. 1 in. x 3 ft. 3 in		
Robert Gould Shaw Memorial	Augustus Saint-Gaudens	1897	Beacon Street	bronze; granite			
Small Child Fountain	Mary E. Moore	1929	Boston Public Garden	bronze; granite	sculpture: 28" x 21" x 17"		
Soldiers and Sailors Monument	Martin Milmore	1877	Boston Common	granite; bronze	column: 126 ft plinth: 35 ft square		
Statler Fountain	Ulysses Anthony Ricci	1930	Statler Park	bronze; granite			
James J. and Helen Storrow Memorial		1948	Charles River Esplanade	bronze; granite			
Charles Sumner Statue	Thomas Ball	1878	Boston Public Garden	bronze; granite			
Temple Bell	Suzuki Magoemon	1675	Back Bay Fens	bronze, granite	sculpture: 91 cm x 61 cm diameter, (36" x 24" diameter) plinth: 109 cm x 81 cm x 81 cm (43" x 32" x 32")		
Thermopylae	Dimitri Hadzi	1966	Boston City Hall Plaza	bronze	sculpture:12 ft. tall and 16 ft. wide		
Maurice J. Tobin Statue	Emilius R. Ciampa	1958	Charles River Esplanade	bronze; granite			
The Tortoise and the Hare	Nancy Schön	1994	Copley Square	bronze			
Triton Babies Fountain	Anna Coleman Ladd	1922	Boston Public Garden	bronze, granite			
Harriet Tubman Memorial)	Fern Cunningham	1999	South End; Harriet Tubman Park	bronze			
David I. Walsh Statue	Joseph Arthur Coletti	1954	Charles River Esplanade	bronze; granite	sculpture: 8 x 3 x 3 ft.		
George Washington equestrian statue	Thomas Ball	1869	Boston Public Garden	bronze; granite	sculpture: 22 x 6 x 15 ft plinth: 16 x 8 x 15 ft.		
Daniel Webster Statue	Hiram Powers	1859	Massachusetts State House	bronze; granite			
George Robert White Memorial	Daniel Chester French; Henry Bacon	1924	Boston Public Garden	bronze; granite			
Kevin White Statue		2006	Faneuil Hall	bronze			
John Winthrop Statue	Richard Saltonstall Greenough	1873	First Church in Boston	bronze; concrete	sculpture: 7 ft. x 2 ft. 5 in. x 2 ft. 3 in. plinth: 4 ft. 6 in. x 4 ft. x 8 ft		
World War I Memorial	Albert Henry Atkins	1922	Adams Square	granite	sculpture: 8 x 12 x 1 ft		
World War II Memorial, Fenway - Kenmore	John Francis Paramino	1948	Back Bay Fens	bronze; granite			

=== Boston Neighborhoods ===
Includes: Charlestown, East Boston, and Jamaica Plain (Cambridge has its own page)

Title	Artist	Year	Location	Material	Dimensions	Notes	Image
Death and the Sculptor	Daniel Chester French	1889	Jamaica Plain Forest Hills Cemetery	bronze			
Firemen's Memorial	John A. Wilson	1909	Jamaica Plain Forest Hills Cemetery	bronze; granite			
Madonna, Queen of the Universe	Arrigo Minerbi	1954	East Boston	bronze, copper	height: 10.6 m (35 ft)		
Massachusetts Korean War Memorial	Robert Shure; Moisey S. Altshuler	1993	Charlestown Charlestown Naval Shipyard Park	bronze; granite; brick			
Donald McKay Memorial	Robert Shure	2005	East Boston Bremen Street Park	bronze; granite			
William Prescott Statue	William Wetmore Story	1881	Charlestown, Monument Square	bronze; granite (Quincy)	sculpture: 8 ft. x 4 ft. x 5 ft. 10 in. plinth:74" x 64" x 70"		
Vietnam Veterans Memorial		2009	Charlestown Green Street 42.22565°N 71.03824°W	granite			
Joseph Warren Statue	Henry Dexter	1857	Charlestown Monument Square				
World War II Memorial, Charlestown		1946	Charlestown City Square Park	granite	height: 15 ft.		

== Additional Artwork ==
- Split Dodecahedron, 2012, Don Tellalian, Rose Kennedy Greenway
- Citgo sign, 1965, Kenmore Square
- Giant Milk Bottle by Arthur Gagner, 1934
- “Bunker Hill Monument” by Solomon Willard, 1842, Charlestown
- Rainbow gas tank (untitled, but often called the “Rainbow Swash”) by Corita Kent, 1971, Dorcester
- Roxbury Love Mural by Ricardo "Deme5" Gomez and Thomas “Kwest” Burns, 2014, spray paint, 17 ft. x 100 ft., Roxbury. Removed 2020.
