= World War II Memorial (disambiguation) =

The World War II Memorial is a national memorial in Washington, D.C.

World War II Memorial may also refer to:

== United States ==
- World War II Memorial (Charlestown, Boston), Massachusetts
- World War II Memorial (Fenway–Kenmore, Boston), Massachusetts
- World War II Memorial (Houston), Texas
- World War II Memorial (Olympia, Washington)

== See also ==
- Category:World War II memorials
