= Gyuri Hollosy =

American sculptor (born 1946)

Gyuri Hollósy (born 1946) is a contemporary German-born American sculptor of Hungarian descent.

== Early life and education ==
Hollósy was born in Bad Aibling, Bavaria, Germany, in 1946. He descends from two Hungarian painters, Simon Hollósy and Tivadar Csontváry Kosztka. In 1955, his family relocated to Cleveland, Ohio, U.S.. He received his BFA from Ohio State University and his MFA from Tulane University. He taught at Tulane University (Louisiana); Washington University in St. Louis (Missouri); Bethany College (Kansas); and at the Johnson Atelier Technical Institute of Sculpture (Mercerville, New Jersey).

== Career ==
Hollósy works at the Grounds for Sculpture in Hamilton, New Jersey.

Since 1994, Hollósy has been awarded five major commissions including: Hungarian Revolution Memorial, Boston, MA; Our Heritage, New Orleans, LA; The Family, Peoria, AZ; Cardinal Mindszenty of Hungary Memorial, Cleveland, OH; and the Hungarian War Memorial in North Olmstead, OH.

== Selected publications ==
- Voices in an Artist's Head (2017) - Gyuri Hollósy, ISBN 978-1524529277

== Works ==
- Hungarian Revolution Memorial (1986), Boston's Liberty Square Park, Massachusetts
