= John Winthrop (disambiguation) =

John Winthrop (1587/8–1649) was the founding governor of the Massachusetts Bay Colony.

John Winthrop may also refer to:

- John Winthrop the Younger (1606–1676), colonial governor of Connecticut
- John Winthrop (educator) (1714–1779), early American astronomer and professor at Harvard College
- John Winthrop (Greenough), a marble statue of the Massachusetts governor by Richard Saltonstall Greenough

== See also ==
- Fitz-John Winthrop (1637–1707), soldier and colonial governor of Connecticut
- Jonathan Winthrop, a character in Passions
