= The Embrace =

2022 sculpture by Hank Willis Thomas

- The sculpture on 22 January 2023
- Artist: Hank Willis Thomas
- Year: 2023
- Medium: Bronze sculpture
- Subject: Martin Luther King Jr.; Coretta Scott King
- Dimensions: 6.7 m (22 ft); height
- Weight: 400,000 pounds (180,000 kg)
- Location: Boston Common, Boston, Massachusetts, U.S.; 42.35494°N 71.06436°W

The Embrace is a bronze sculpture by Hank Willis Thomas, installed on Boston Common in Boston, Massachusetts, United States, in December 2022. The artwork commemorates Martin Luther King Jr. and Coretta Scott King, and depicts four intertwined arms, representing the hug they shared after he was awarded the Nobel Peace Prize in 1964. The work was created by welding together about 609 smaller pieces. The sculpture has received largely negative responses from critics and the public.

== Description ==
The Embrace is a 20-foot tall (6.1 m) and 25-foot wide (7.6 m) bronze sculpture weighing 19 tons. It depicts four intertwined arms and hands, representing an embrace between Martin Luther King Jr. and Coretta Scott King. Details include buttons on the sleeves of his arms, and a bracelet on her wrist.

The sculpture design is intended to emphasize the Kings' commitment to nonviolence and the importance of love as a motivating factor in their civil rights movement work.

The sculpture is situated within a circular plaza, the 1965 Freedom Plaza, which recognizes 69 individuals who were civil rights leaders in Boston from the 1950s through the 1970s. The plaza is located within the Boston Common, a public park in downtown Boston, and is situated in between the Boston Common Visitor Center and the Boston Massacre Monument.

== History ==
In 2017, the Boston Foundation and Embrace Boston (formerly King Boston), an organization dedicated to establishing a memorial to Martin Luther King Jr. in Boston, put out a call for proposals for a public artwork in honor of King. Two years later, Hank Willis Thomas' design of The Embrace was selected from among 126 submissions. The work was created by Mass Design Group in Walla Walla, Washington, and was installed on the Boston Common in December 2022. It was formally dedicated on January 13, 2023, with dignitaries present, along with the Kings' son and one of their granddaughters. Crowds gathered to view the new statue two days later on Martin Luther King Jr. Day.

== Reception ==
The sculpture on January 16, 2023

The piece has been widely panned by critics, the public, and at least one member of the extended Scott-King family. The work was heavily criticized and mocked across social media, with many Twitter users deeming the sculpture ugly, and others stating that the sculpture appeared to be phallic or pornographic when viewed from various angles.

Journalist Travis M. Andrews, writing in The Washington Post, said many disliked that the sculpture did not depict the Kings "in full." Seneca Scott, a cousin of Coretta Scott King, called the sculpture "masturbatory" in an article in Compact, deeming the piece "insulting to the black community" and a "waste of money." Scott wrote that, in his opinion, "ten million dollars were wasted." Scott later clarified in an interview with The Guardian that he was unaware the sculpture was entirely funded by private donations, having assumed that the work was publicly funded, and described his initial reaction as an expression of grief over the omission of Coretta Scott King's face from the work as well as frustration over what he viewed as a lack of tangible support for black communities from the nonprofits that spearheaded the project.

Journalist Michael Brendan Dougherty of the conservative National Review called the statue "an artistic and civic failure. The photograph from which it takes inspiration could be an iconic image of the Kings. But limbs, unattached to whole bodies, make for an uncanny sculptural subject. One must be told what it is to make any connection to Martin Luther King Jr." Opinion columnist Rasheed N. Walters of The Boston Globe wrote that the sculpture was "aesthetically unpleasant". Writing in The Washington Post, critic Sebastian Smee said the work "fails artistically," calling it visually "arresting" but ultimately "inherently awkward." Comedian Leslie Jones, in her first episode as the guest host of The Daily Show, remarked that the statue unintentionally resembled the act of cunnilingus, making a pun that "...I know Dr. King went down in history, but this is not how you show it".

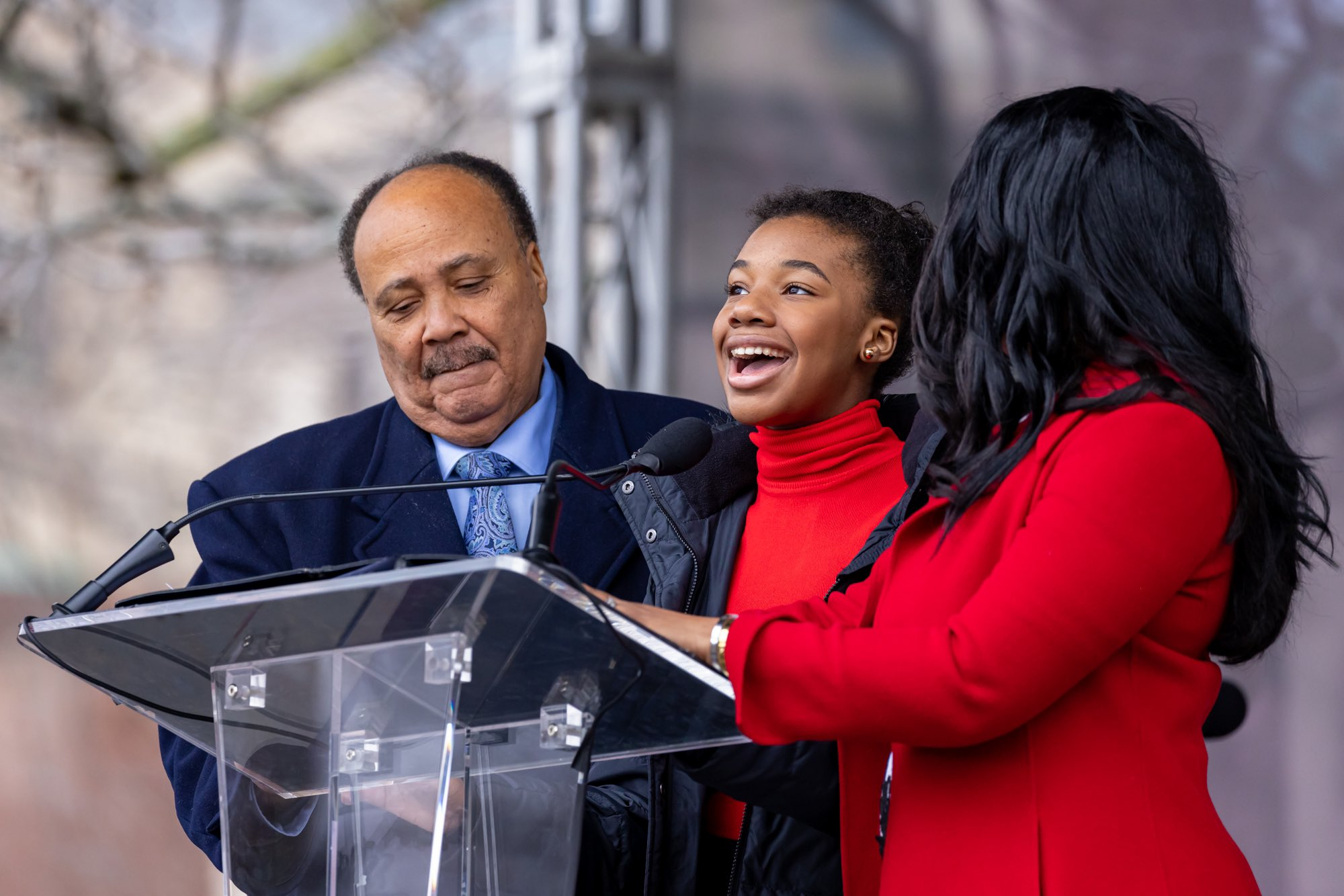
Martin Luther King III and his daughter Yolanda Renee King speaking at the unveiling of the sculpture

Despite the heavy criticism, the piece has received some praise since its unveiling on the Boston Common in January 2023. In addition to local dignitaries, there were two members of the King family in attendance at the unveiling – the Kings' son, Martin Luther King III, and his 14-year-old daughter (the Kings' granddaughter), Yolanda Renee King. Yolanda King remarked that she saw "love and strength and unity in these hands and how they symbolize a beautiful marriage and partnership. It was one that changed the world."

In response to heavy criticism of the sculpture, Thomas told a CNN interviewer shortly after the work's public unveiling that he would not change any element of the sculpture if asked, reiterating that the Boston public had voted in favor of his design: "This is a piece that was selected by the people of Boston, this is not a 'Hank just came and put something.'" He went on to claim that of the thousands of people who had helped design and fabricate the piece, none had seen the sculpture in a pornographic light, as described by critics, and he deemed that viewing of the work to be "perverse". Writing in Hyperallergic, critic Seph Rodney questioned Thomas' rebuttal, saying "given the prolonged process of selecting and designing this work, it’s almost inconceivable that no one noticed that from certain angles the piece would not convey what the artist says he intended." Rodney went on to speculate that "it may be the case that in dealing with a prominent artist handling a $10 million commission those involved who might have flagged potential problems silenced themselves rather than being regarded as 'negative.'"

== See also ==
- Civil rights movement in popular culture
- List of memorials to Martin Luther King Jr.
- List of public art in Boston
