= Statue of John Winthrop (U.S. Capitol) =

Statue by Richard Saltonstall Greenough

John Winthrop
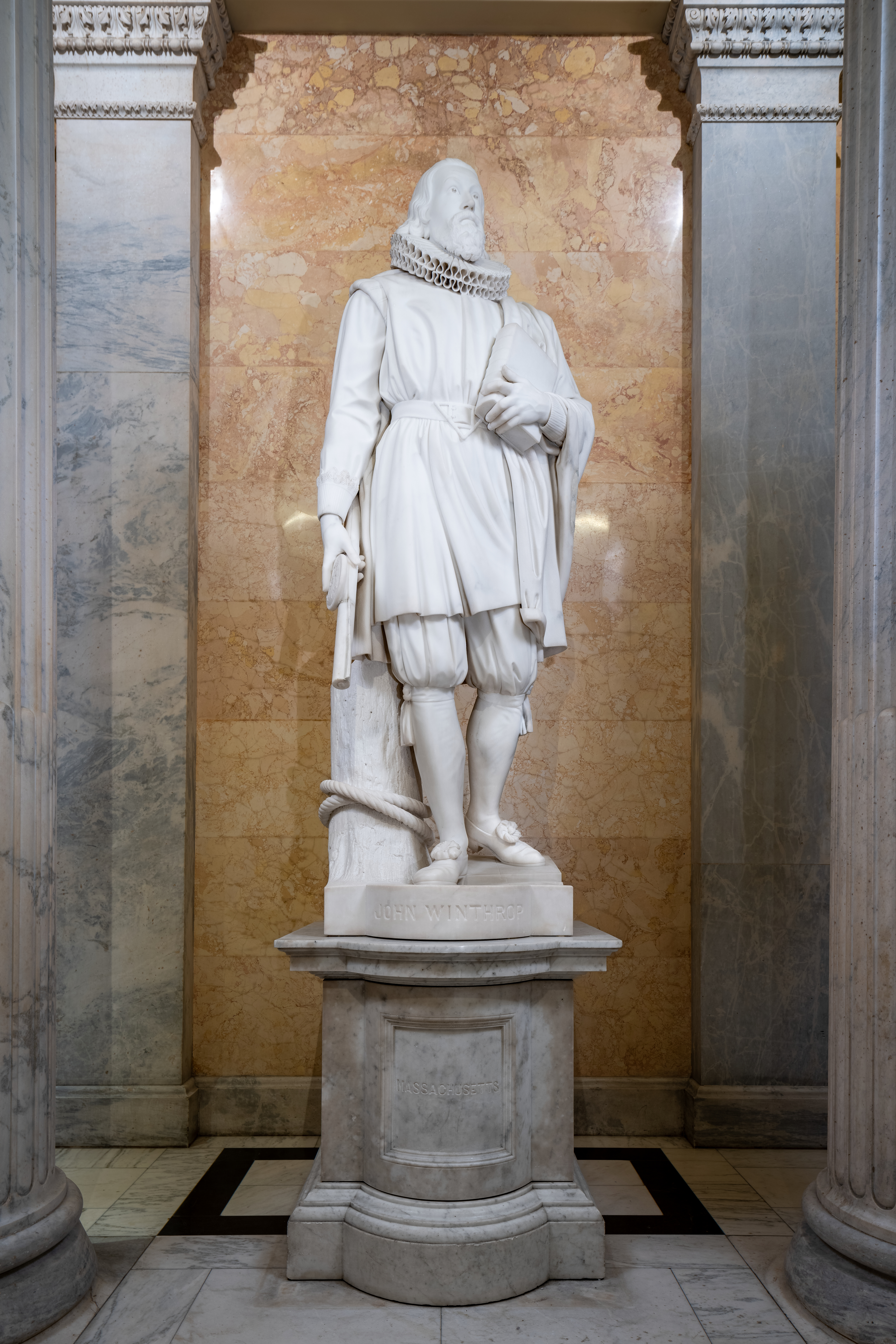
- The statue in the Hall of Columns in 2023
- Artist: Richard Saltonstall Greenough
- Medium: Marble sculpture
- Subject: John Winthrop
- Location: Washington, D.C., United States

Marble statue of John Winthrop by Richard Saltonstall Greenough, installed in the United States Capitol, in Washington D.C., as part of the National Statuary Hall Collection. It is one of two statues donated by the state of Massachusetts. The statue was accepted in the collection by George Frisbie Hoar on December 19, 1876.

A bronze cast of the statue of Winthrop, who served eleven terms as governor of Massachusetts and presided over the witchcraft trial and execution of Margaret Jones, and the trial that expelled Anne Hutchinson, was made in 1880 and was first placed in Scollay Square in Boston. In 1903, it was moved to the First Church in the Back Bay, as its location in Scollay Square was needed for an exit for the Court Street subway station. Badly damaged by a fire in 1968, it was eventually restored and remains in front of the church.
