= Commissioners Landing =

Focal point in Boston, Massachusetts

Coordinates: 42°21′31″N 71°4′26″W

- Landing
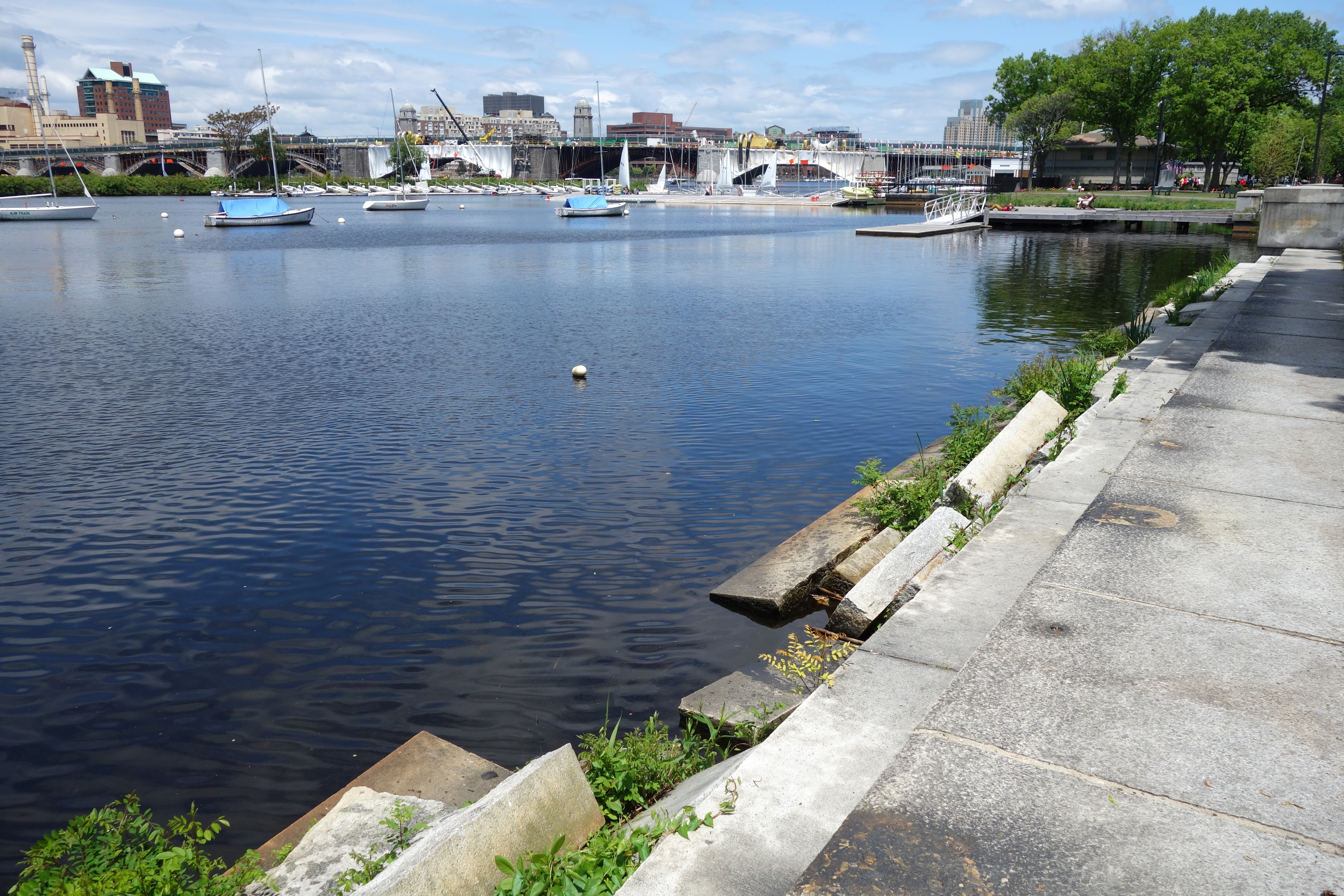
- Commissioners Landing in 2014.
- Design: Arthur Shurcliff
- Completed: 1930s
- Location: Charles River Esplanade, Boston, Massachusetts, U.S.
- Interactive map of Commissioners Landing

Commissioners Landing is a focal point along Boston's Charles River Esplanade, in the U.S. state of Massachusetts. Designed by Arthur Shurcliff during the 1930s, the landing features a granite wall and approximately 3-foot (0.91 m) balustrade, with steps leading to the river. Inscriptions at each end commemorate the Metropolitan Park Commission and the Metropolitan District Commission. The landing also serves as a dock.

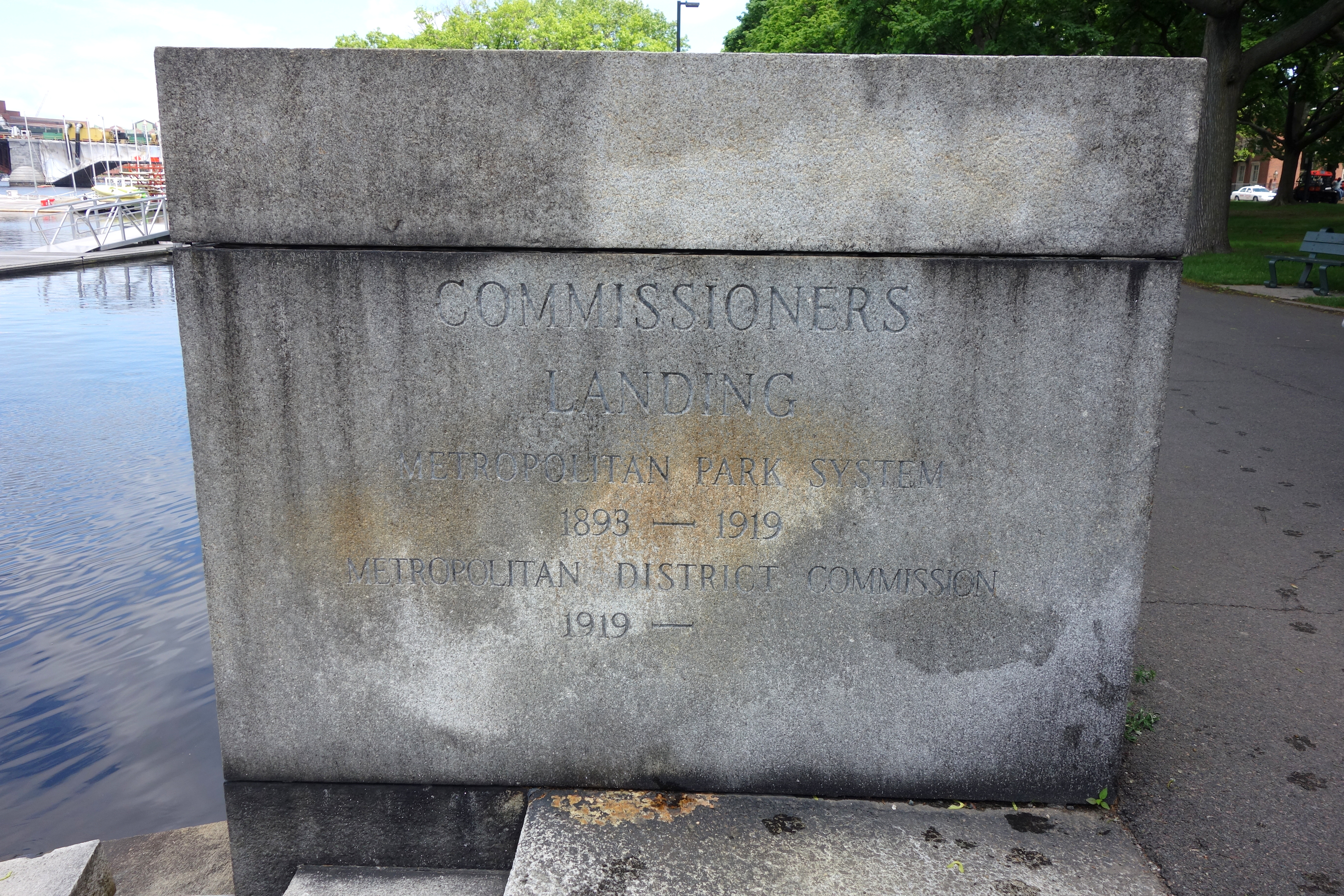
Inscription

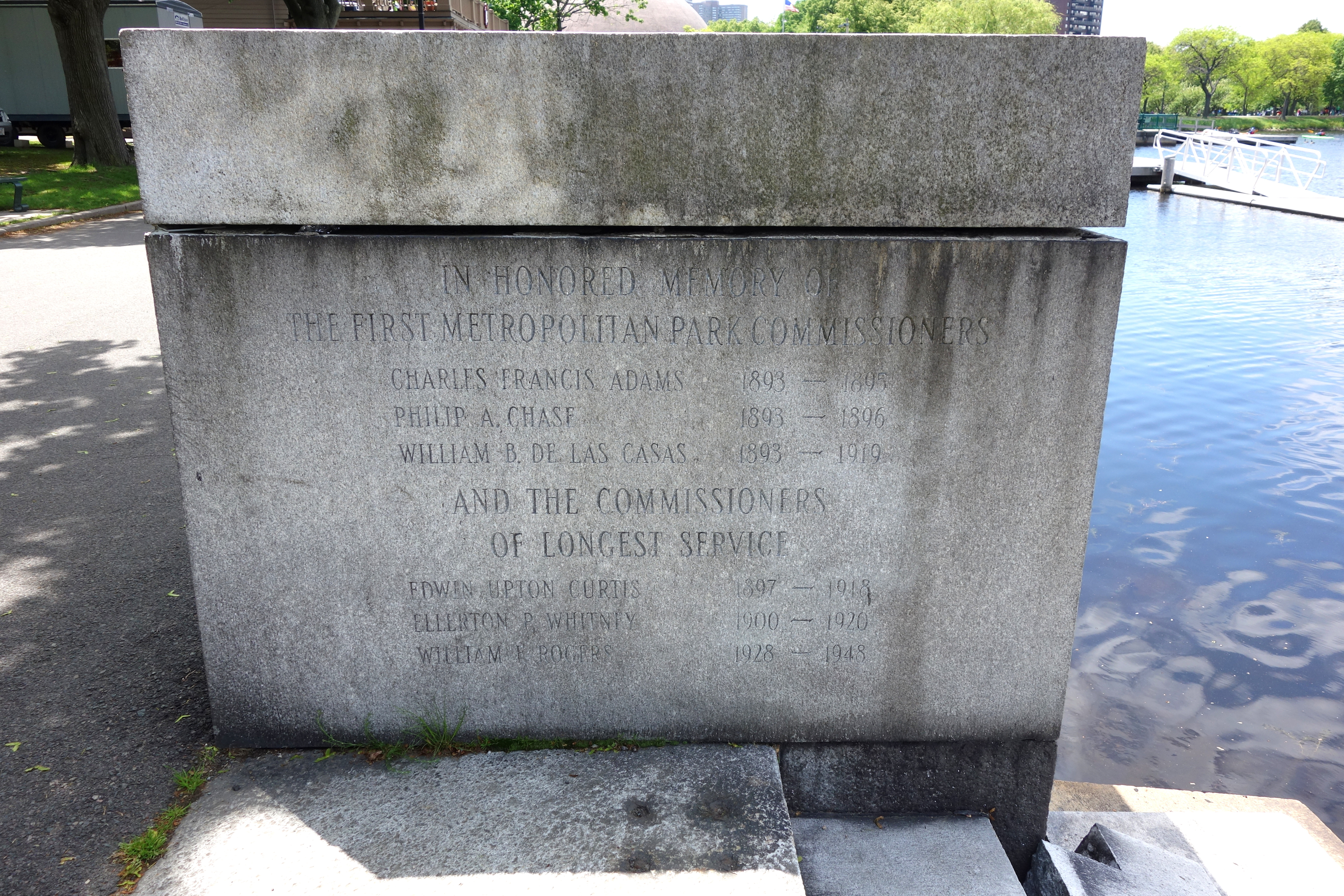
Inscription
