= Bust of Richard Cushing =

Sculpture in Boston, Massachusetts, U.S.

- The bust in 2019
- Artist: James Rosati
- Year: 1980–1981
- Subject: Richard Cushing
- Location: Boston, Massachusetts, United States; 42.361543°N 71.062367°W

A bust of Richard Cushing by James Rosati, sometimes called Richard Cardinal Cushing, is installed in Boston's Cardinal Cushing Memorial Park, in the U.S. state of Massachusetts.

== Description and history ==
The bronze sculpture was completed during 1980–1981 and measures approximately 24 x 20 x 16 in. It rests on a red granite base that measures approximately 61 x 24 x 24 in. The work was surveyed as part of the Smithsonian Institution's "Save Outdoor Sculpture!" program in 1996.

== See also ==
- 1981 in art
