= Harbor Fog =

Public art installation in Boston, Massachusetts, U.S.

Coordinates: 42°21′27″N 71°03′05″W

- Stilled buoys dream of a lost harbor
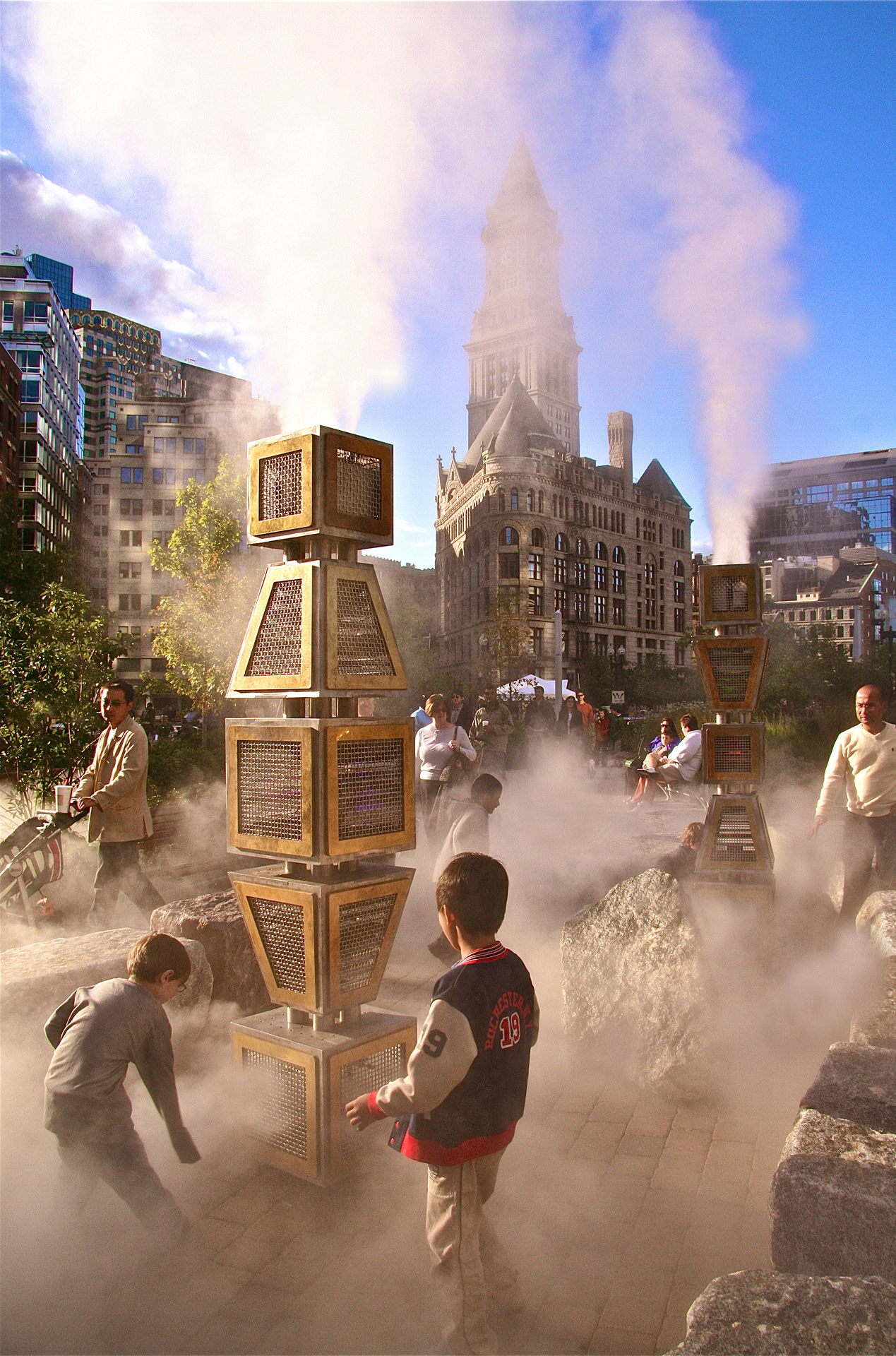
- Artist: Ross Miller
- Year: 2009
- Type: Sculpture
- Medium: stainless steel, bronze, granite, lights, fog, sound, sensors and sequencer
- Dimensions: .06 acres (240 m^{2})
- Location: Boston, Massachusetts
- Owner: Mass Department of Transportation

Harbor Fog, stilled buoys dream of a lost harbor, is a responsive sensor-activated interactive contemporary public sculptural environment located in Boston along the main pedestrian walkway of Wharf District Park Parcel 17, on the Rose Fitzgerald Kennedy Greenway. The first permanent public artwork along the Greenway, the concept was selected through a competition for commission by the Mass Highway Department, and integrated into site construction in collaboration with engineers during building of the Central Artery/Tunnel Project (Big Dig).

The Harbor Fog sculpture is part of a genre of environmental artworks that use high pressure cold water fog, hot steam fog, or other gaseous materials, to produce immersive environmental sculpture.

== Background ==
In the 17th century the site was at the edge of Boston Harbor. During periods of development over the following 260 years, urban rubble and fill was deposited, creating made land between former wharfs. The sculpture is inspired by the dynamic historical landform alterations at the location, changing light and weather patterns found at the ocean's edge, and the industrial design of harbor navigational aids.

== Design details ==
The sculpture is constructed of three column forms fabricated from stainless steel and bronze, that reference the shape of buoys, each column contains multiple fog nozzles, LED light sources, motion sensors, and sound systems. The sculptural columns are surrounded by a boat-shaped outline of granite seawall blocks, salvaged from landfill containing 18th century piers that were discovered during sub-surface highway construction. The 2000 lb granite seawall blocks are elevated on stainless steel supports that allow the fog to travel under the blocks, and openings between the elevated blocks allow passage into the interior space. Multiple motion sensors on top of the vertical columns register pedestrian activity that is transmitted to a computer processor to control changing sequences of fog, light, and sound.

The technology that operates the sculpture is maintained by the non-profit Rose Kennedy Greenway Conservancy.

Open all year, the water fog system operates seasonally.
