= City Square Park =

Park in Boston, Massachusetts, U.S.

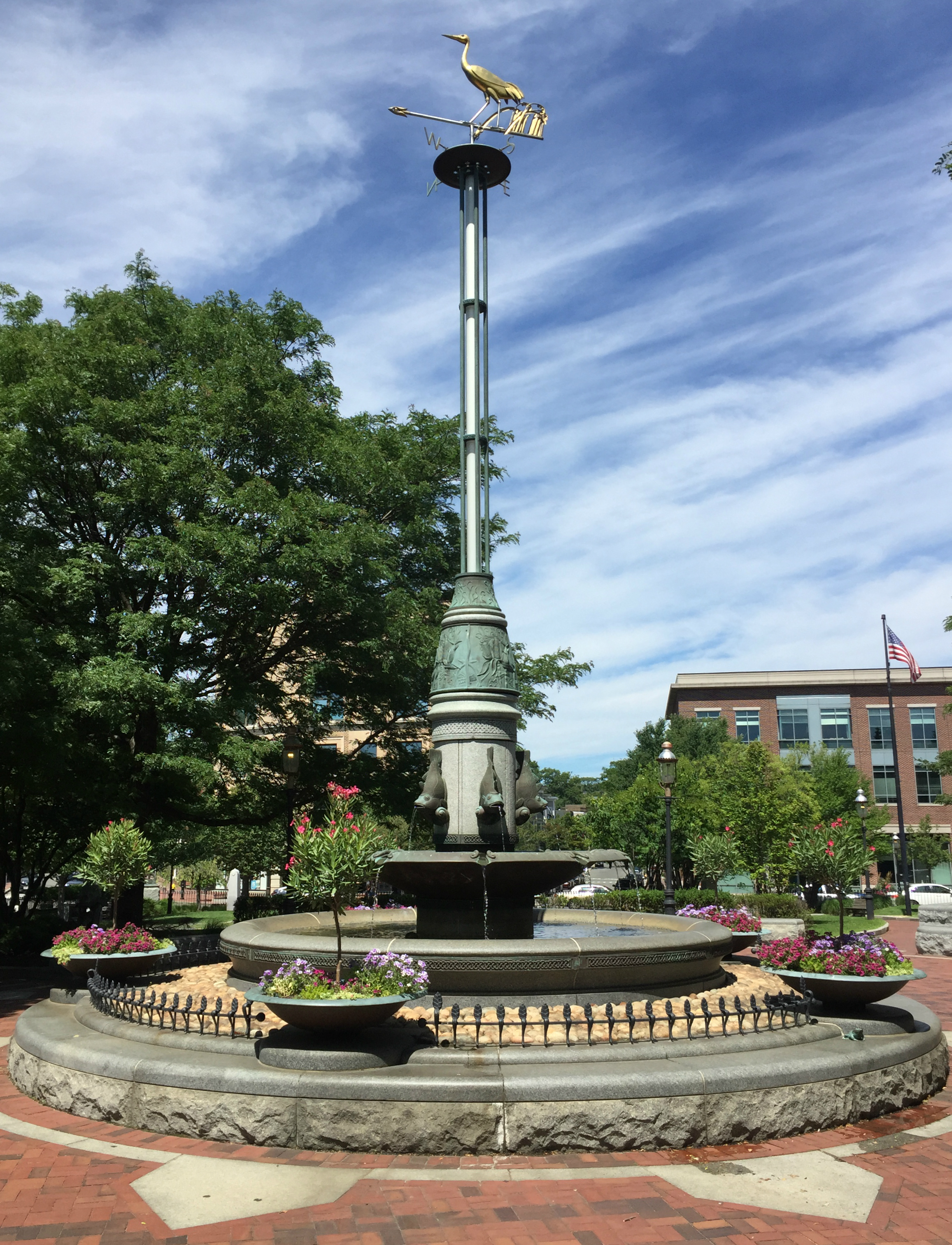
- Fountain in the park in 2016
- Interactive map of City Square Park
- Type: Park
- Location: Charlestown
- Nearest city: Boston, Massachusetts, U.S.
- Coordinates: 42.3717°N 71.0619°W

City Square Park is a park in Boston's Charlestown neighborhood, in the U.S. state of Massachusetts. The park has a World War II Memorial.

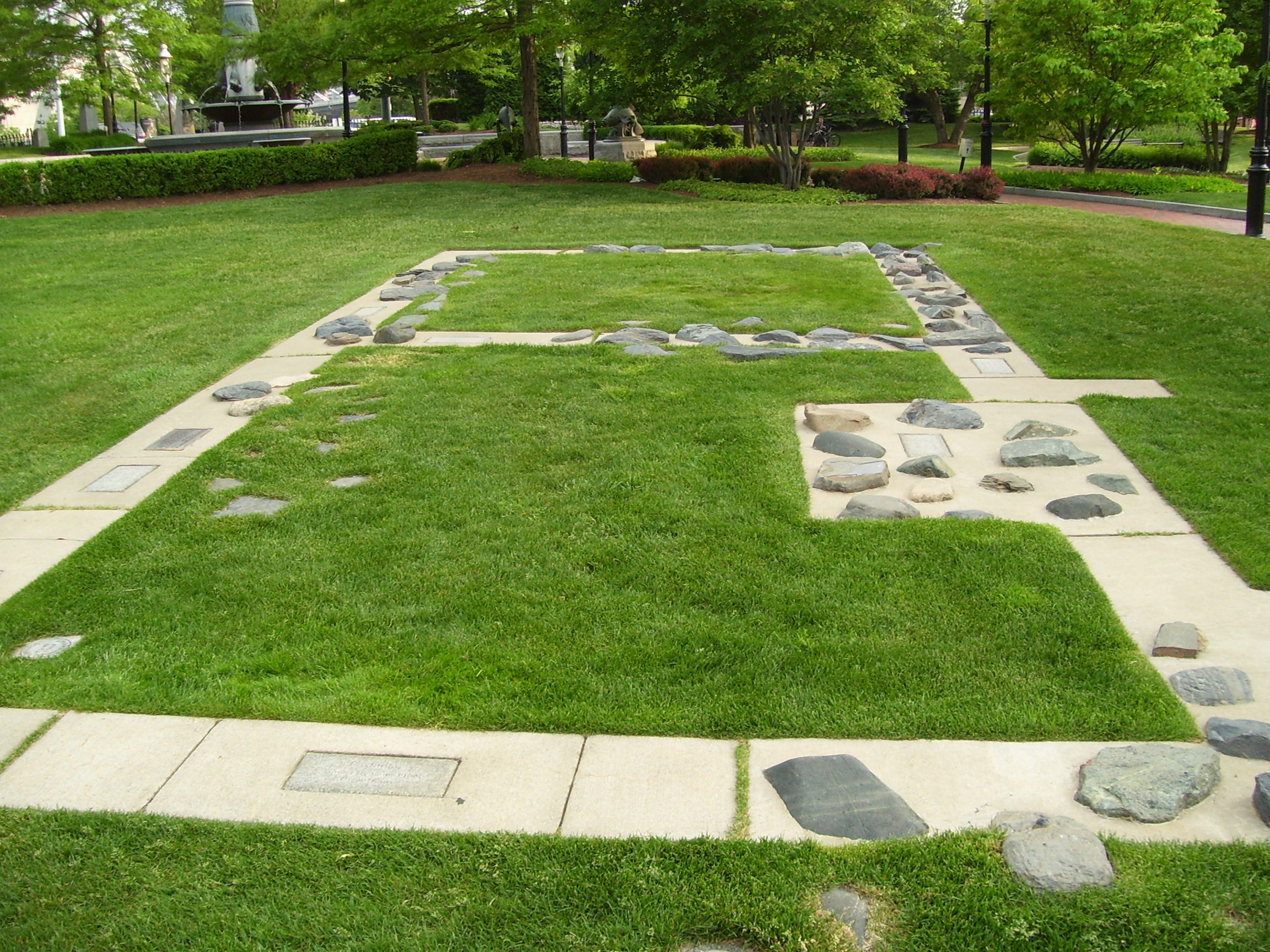
John Winthrop Great House site, 2008

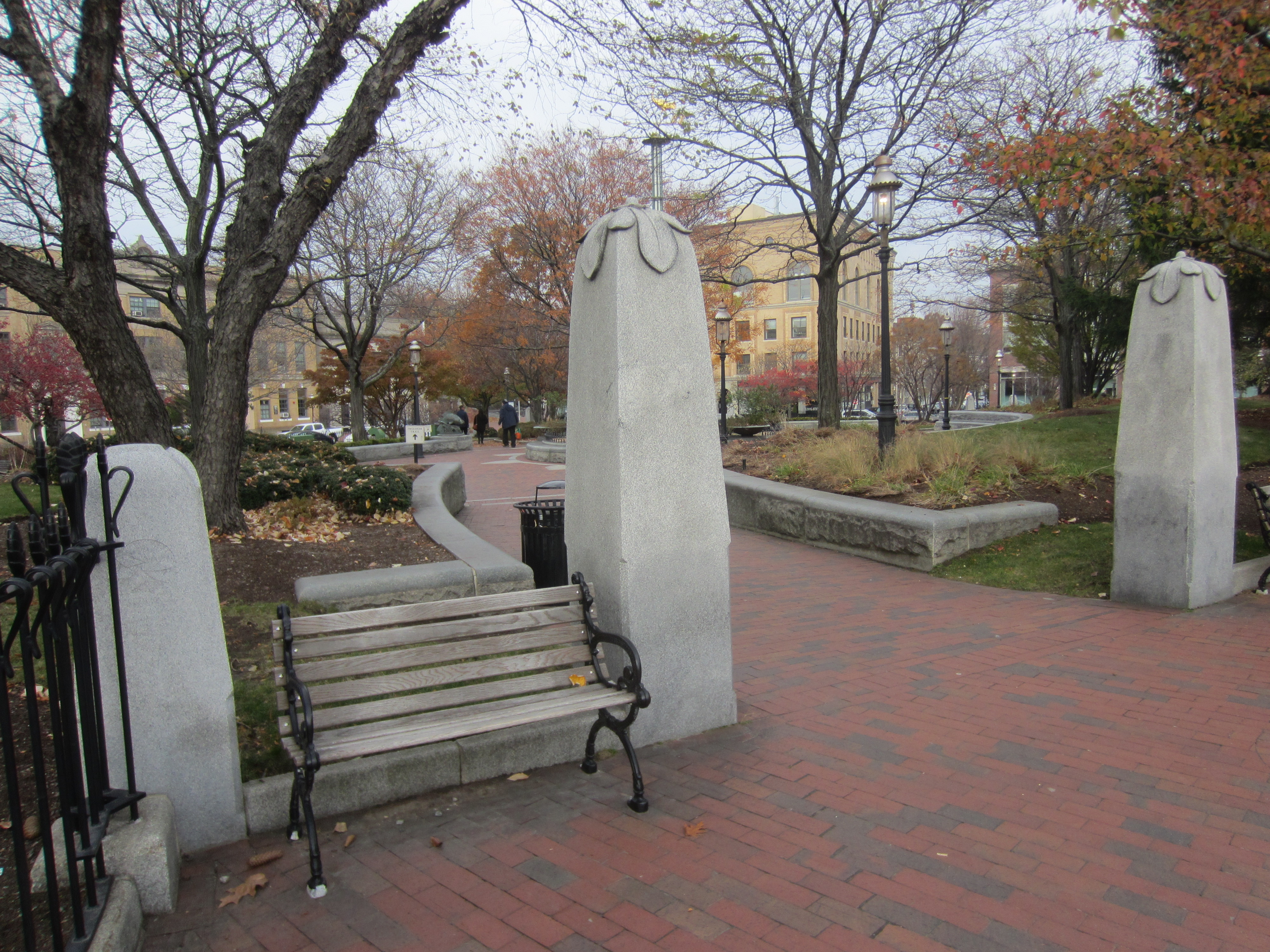
Eastern Entry to the Park

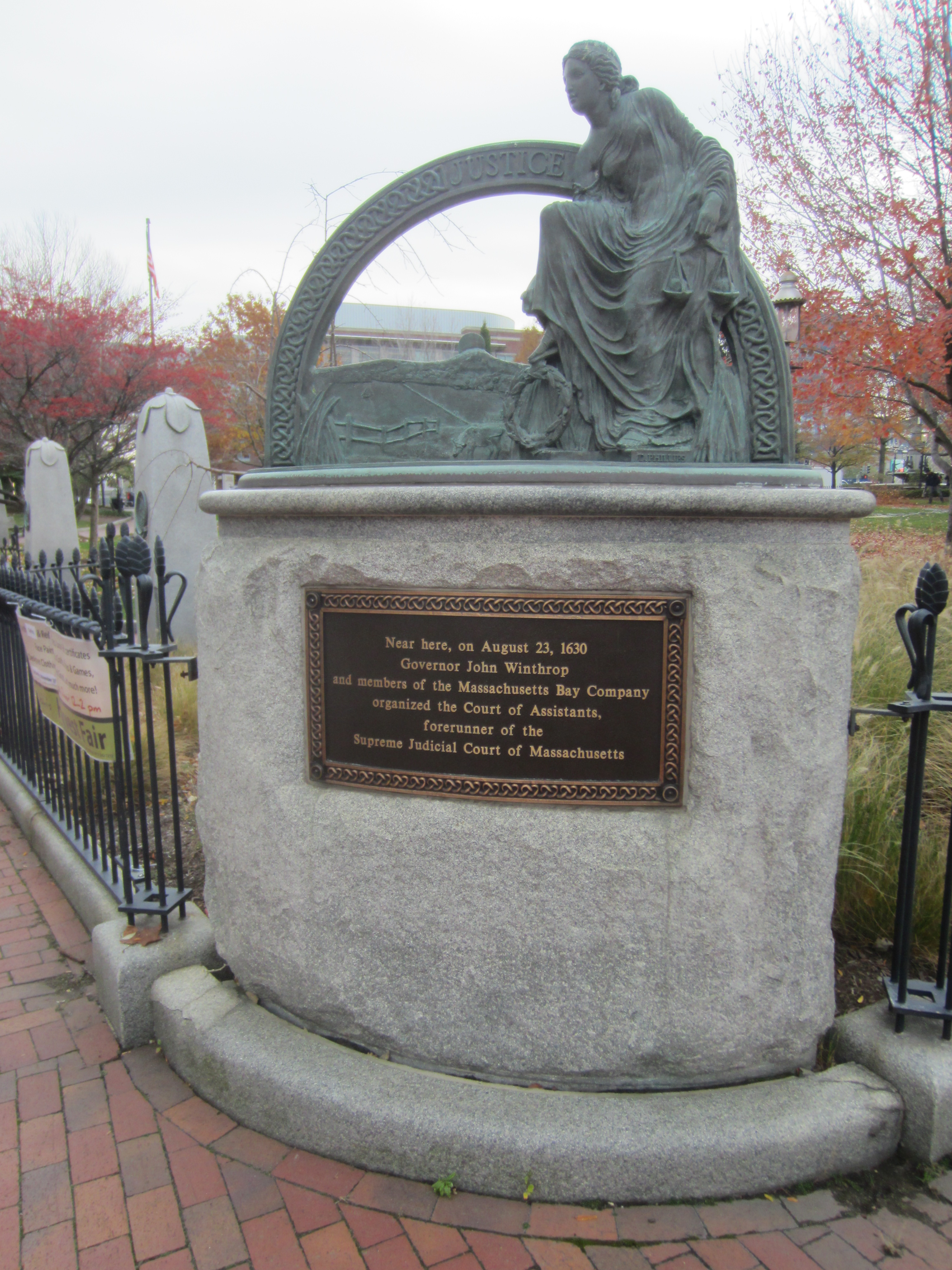
Sculpture featuring Justice facing Main Street

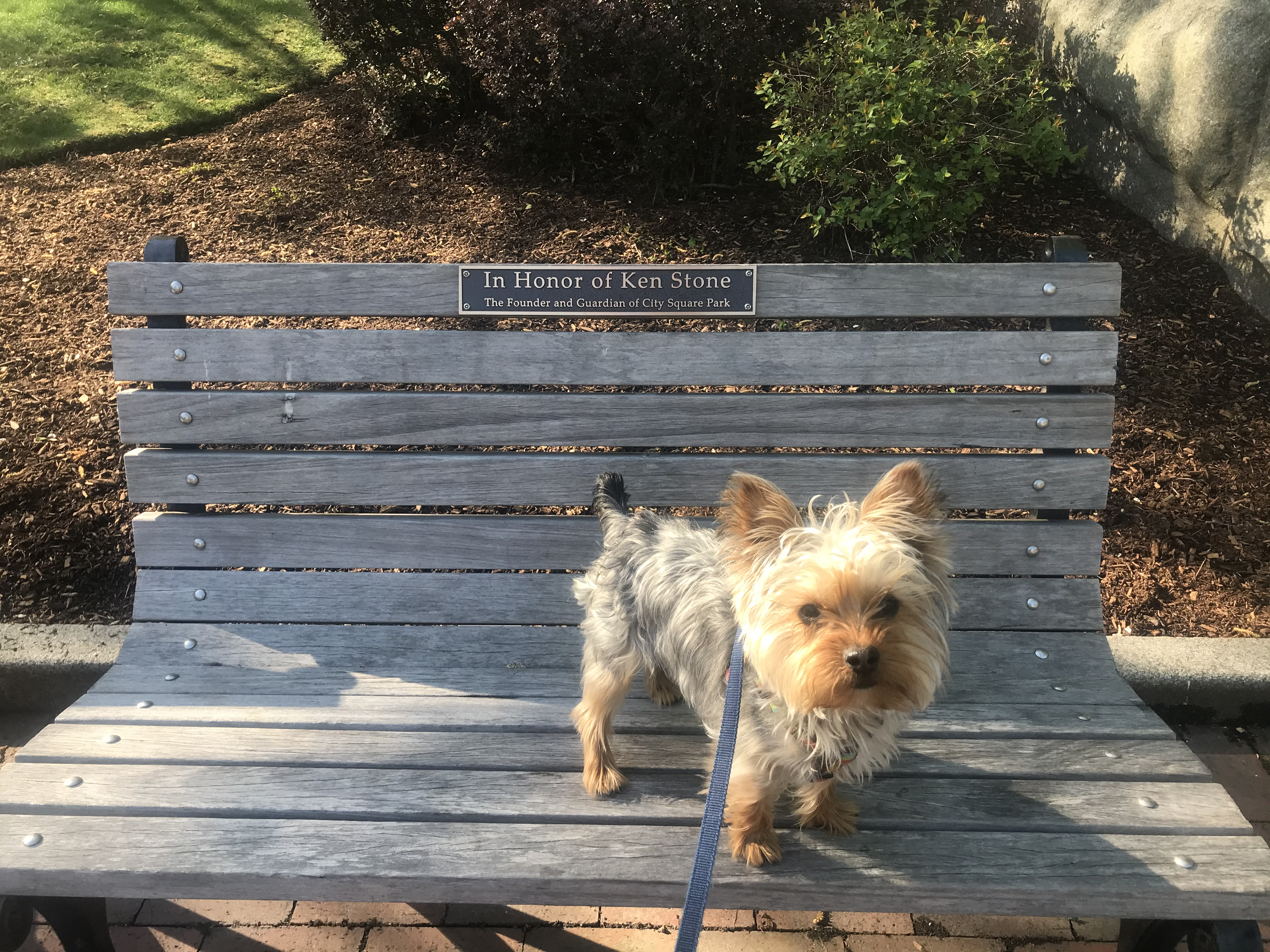
City Square Park Bench honoring Kenneth Stone a key driver of the park's establishment

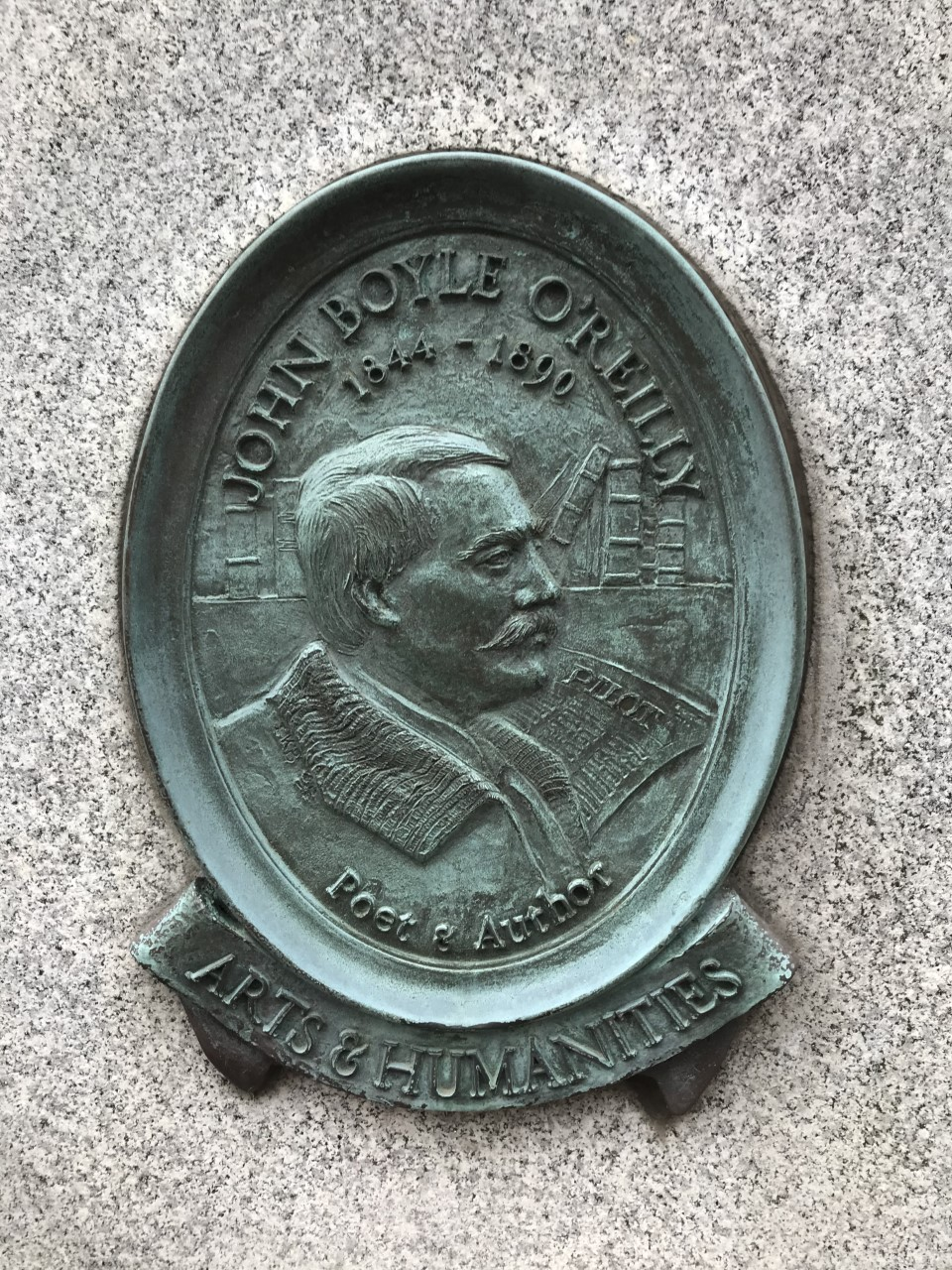
The John Boyle O'Reilly Plaque is one of several honoring past prominent residents of Charlestown Massachusetts
