= Statue of John Endecott =

Statue in Boston, Massachusetts, U.S.

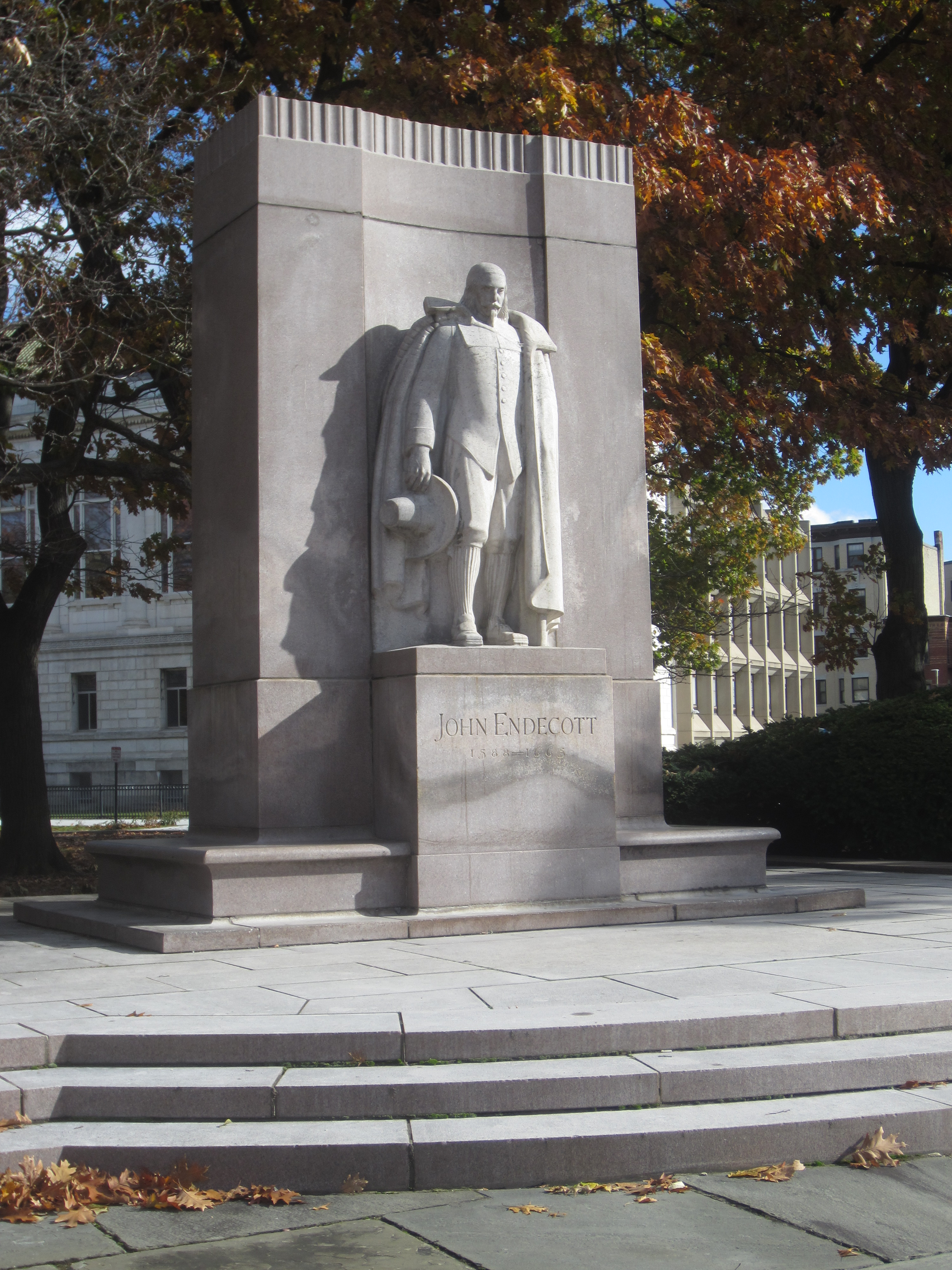
- The statue in 2019
- Medium: Granite sculpture
- Subject: John Endecott
- Location: Boston, Massachusetts, U.S.; 42°20′26.4″N 71°5′34.5″W

A statue of John Endecott by artist C. Paul Jennewein and architect Ralph Weld Gray is installed along The Fenway, in Boston's Forsyth Park, in the U.S. state of Massachusetts. Activists have objected to the statue because of Endecott's treatment of Indigenous Americans.

== Description ==
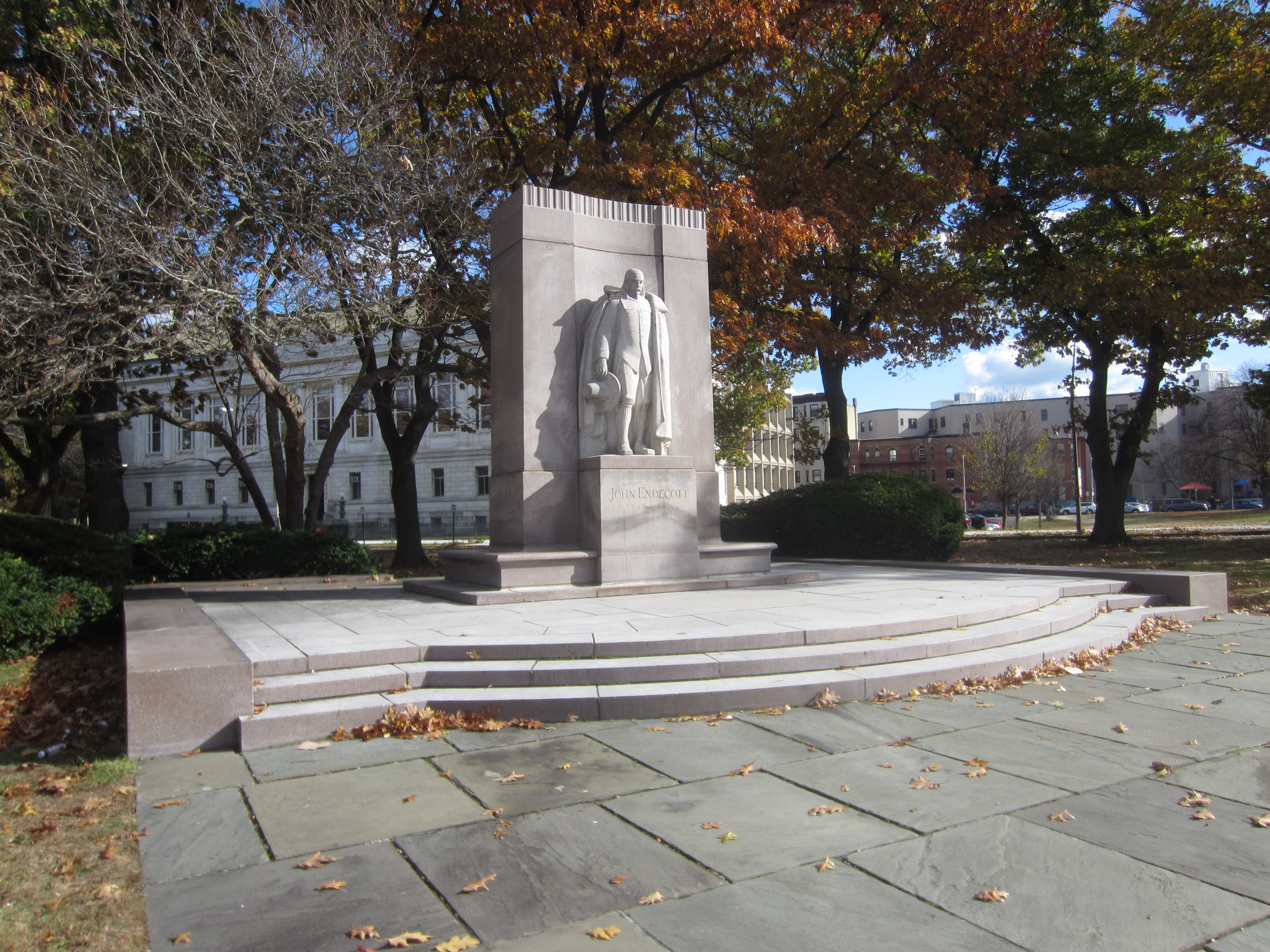
The memorial, 2019

The white granite statue is installed at the intersection of Hemenway Street and Forsyth Way, in Boston's Forsyth Park. It measures approximately 9 ft. 10 in. x 4 ft. 7 in x 6 ft. 6 in., and rests on a red granite base that measures approximately 4 ft. 7 in. x 13 ft. 4 in. x 7 ft. 10 in. The base is attached to a granite wall with benches.

== History ==
The 1936 memorial was surveyed by the Smithsonian Institution's "Save Outdoor Sculpture!" program in 1993. The statue has prompted controversy because of Endecott's role in waging war against Indigenous populations. Protestors spray painted the statue with the tag "#LandBack" in June, 2020. The statue was subsequently cleaned and the city resisted calls for the statue's removal.

== See also ==
- 1936 in art
