= Forsyth Park (Boston) =

Park in Fenway–Kenmore, Boston, Massachusetts, U.S.

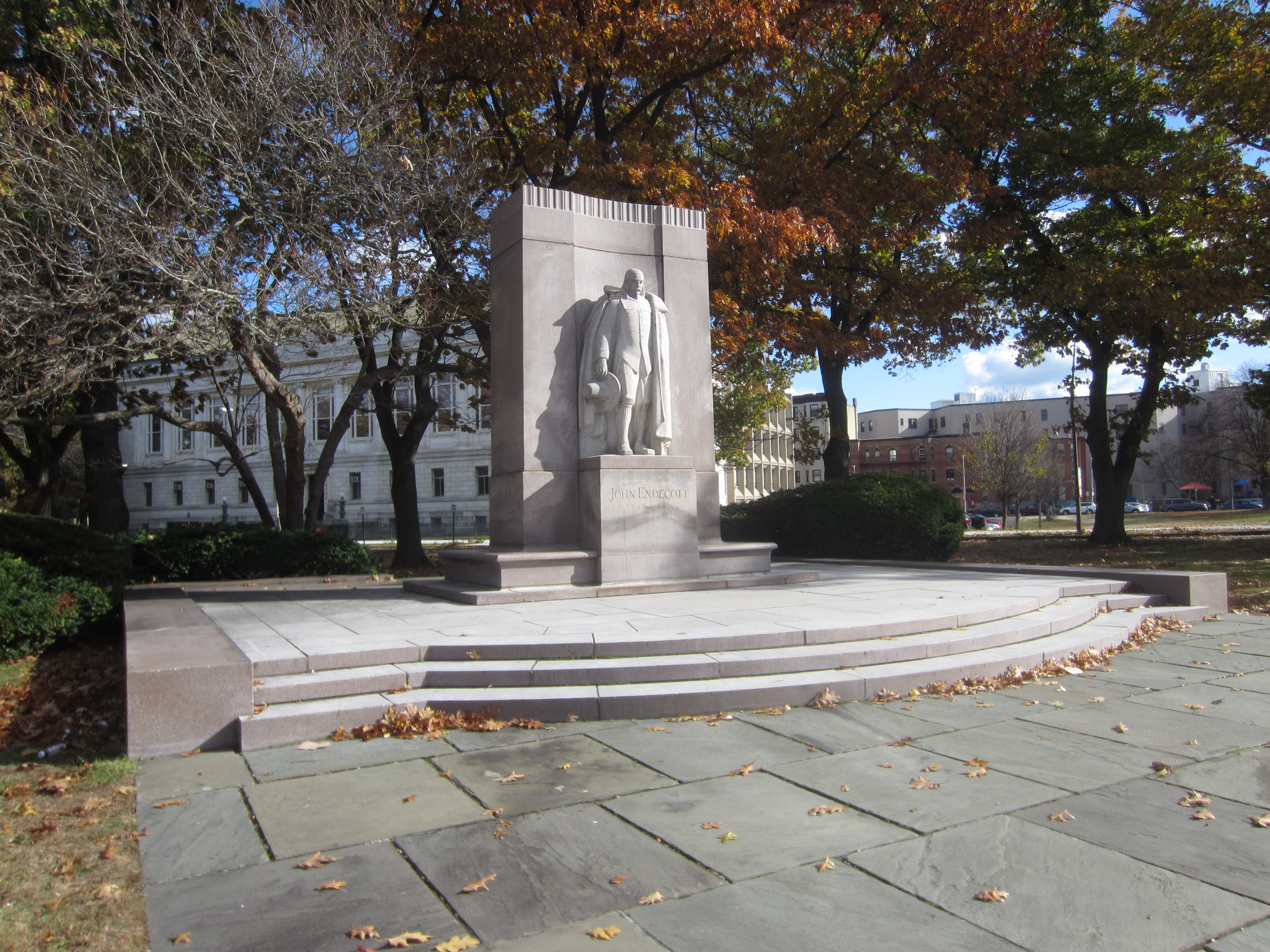
- The park's statue of John Endecott in 2019

- Location within Boston
- Nearest city: Boston, Massachusetts, U.S.
- Coordinates: 42.34063°N 71.09284°W
- Area: 1.68 acres (0.68 ha)
- Designer: Frederick Law Olmsted
- Operator: Boston Parks and Recreation Department
- Status: Public park
- Public transit: Northeastern, Green Line

Forsyth Park is a 1.68-acre (0.68 ha) park along the Fenway in Boston's Fenway–Kenmore neighborhood, in Massachusetts, United States. Part of the Emerald Necklace, the park features a statue of John Endecott.

Forsyth Park in the Fall
