= Boston Public Garden Flagpole Base =

Sculpture in Boston, Massachusetts, U.S.

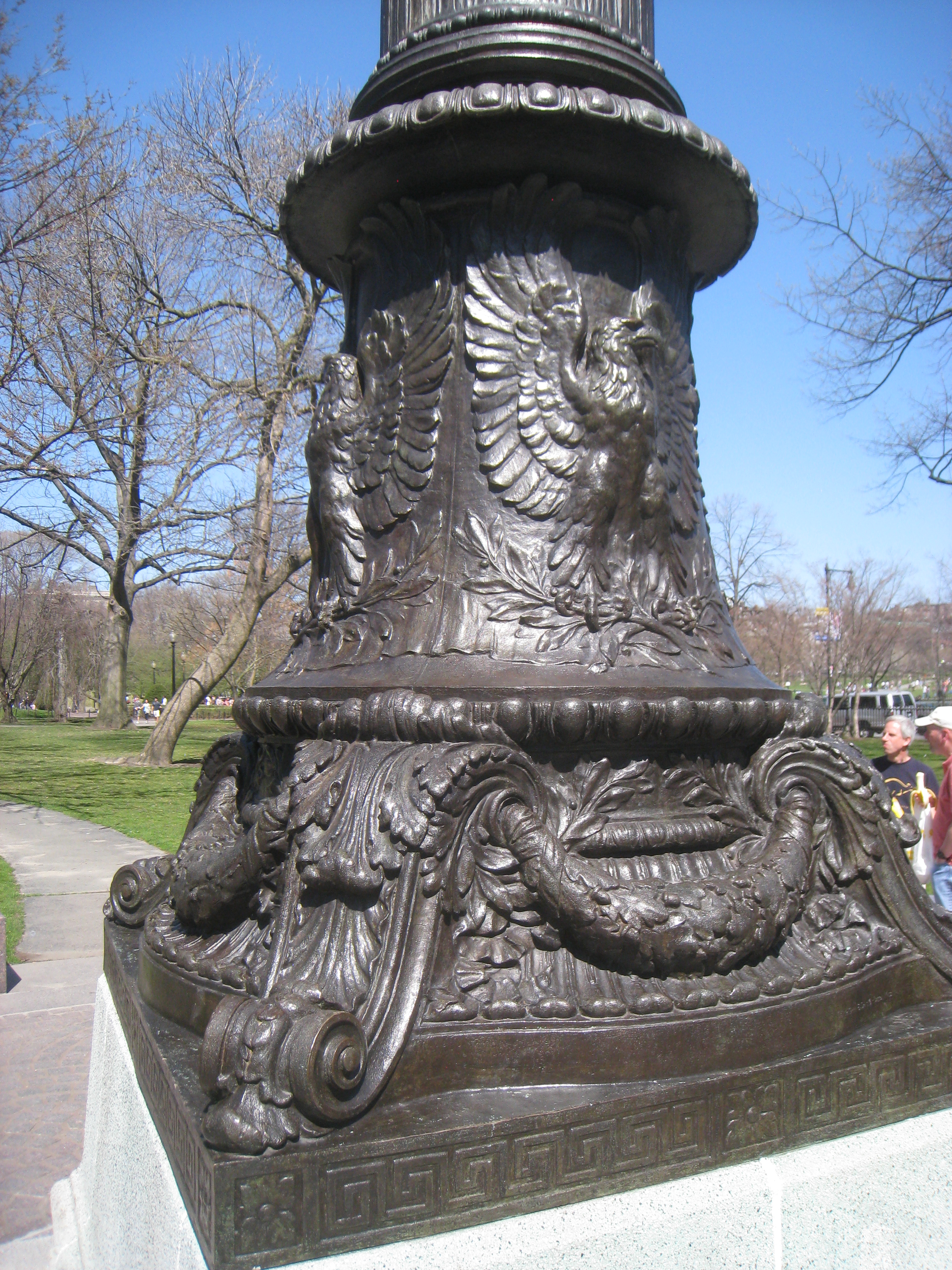
- The base in 2010
- Artist: William D. Austen
- Year: 1921
- Medium: Bronze sculpture
- Location: Boston, Massachusetts, U.S.; 42.353613°N 71.068604°W

Boston Public Garden Flagpole Base is a 1921 flagpole base, memorial, and sculpture by William D. Austen, installed in Boston Public Garden, in Boston, Massachusetts, United States. The bronze base measures approximately 6 × 4 × 4 ft., and rests on a granite plinth that measures 3.5 × 7 × 7 ft. It has four facades with reliefs depicting American eagles holding branches and spreading their wings, and serves as a World War I memorial. The base replaced another destroyed by lightning in 1920. It was originally installed at the site of the original base, at the intersection of Boylston Street and Arlington Street, but was moved to its present location in 1933. The work was surveyed by the Smithsonian Institution's "Save Outdoor Sculpture!" program in 1993.

== See also ==
- 1921 in art
