= World War I Memorial (Boston) =

War memorial in Boston, Massachusetts, U.S.

Coordinates: 42°17′10.7″N 71°7′43″W

Royal Artillery Memorial
- United States of America
- For Casualties of the First world war
- Unveiled: 1922; 104 years ago
- Location: Boston, Massachusetts
- Designed by: Albert Henry Atkins
- 1917-1918 / ROSLINDALE HONORS ITS VICTORIOUS SONS AND DAUGHTERS IN WORLD WAR I IN THE GLORY OF THEIR YOUTH WE SHALL REMEMBER THEM / ROSLINDALE HONORS THE MEN AND WOMEN WHO SERVED IN KOREA AND VIETNAM

A World War I Memorial by Albert Henry Atkins is installed in Adams Square, in Boston, Massachusetts, United States. The 1922 stone memorial is approximately 8 x 12 x 1 ft. and features a relief of a standing female in classical attire. An inscription on the front reads: 1917-1918 / ROSLINDALE HONORS ITS VICTORIOUS SONS AND DAUGHTERS IN WORLD WAR I IN THE GLORY OF THEIR YOUTH WE SHALL REMEMBER THEM / ROSLINDALE HONORS THE MEN AND WOMEN WHO SERVED IN KOREA AND VIETNAM. The artwork was surveyed as part of the Smithsonian Institution's "Save Outdoor Sculpture!" program in 1997.
