= Cardinal Cushing Memorial Park =

Park in Boston

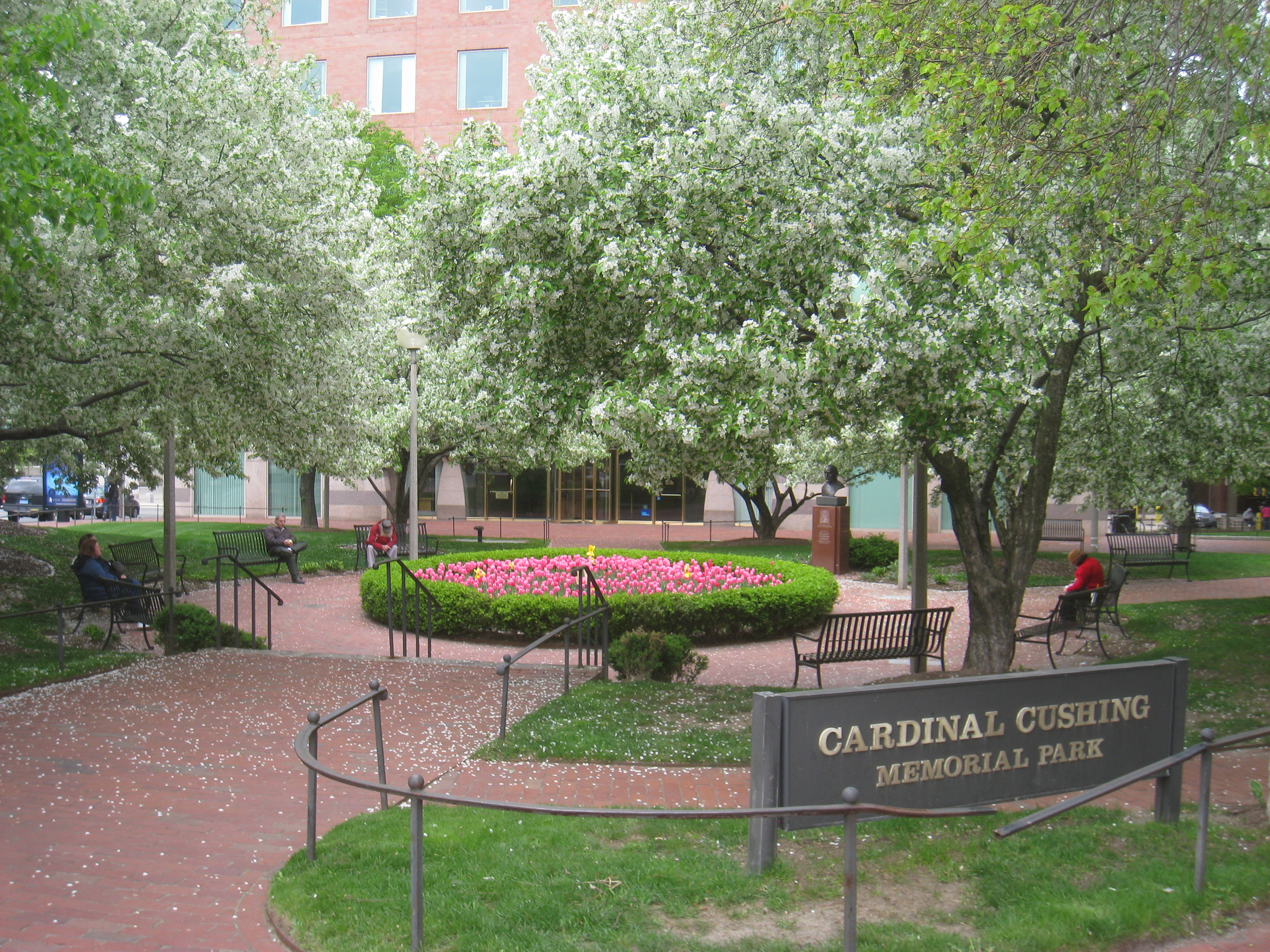
- The park in 2010
- Interactive map of Cardinal Cushing Memorial Park
- Type: Park
- Nearest city: Boston, Massachusetts
- Coordinates: 42.36151°N 71.0624°W

Cardinal Cushing Memorial Park (or Cardinal Cushing Park) is a park located at 5 New Chardon Street in Boston, Massachusetts, United States. The park features a bust of Richard Cushing.
