= City Carpet =

Mosaic in Boston, Massachusetts, U.S.

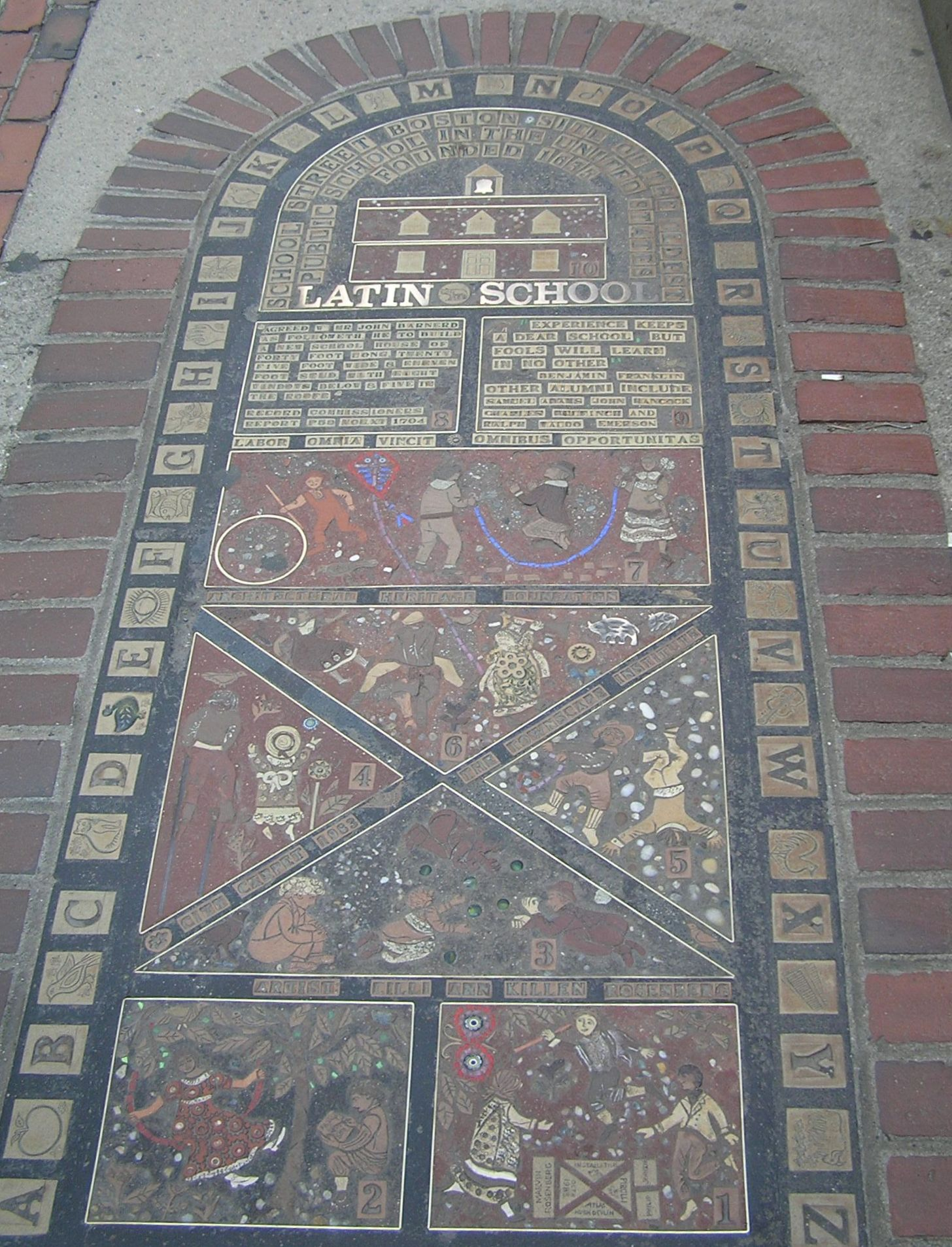
- Artist: Lilli Ann Killen Rosenberg
- Year: 1983
- Medium: Ceramic; bronze; stone; brick; concrete
- Location: Boston, Massachusetts, U.S.
- 42.35788°N 71.05977°W

City Carpet is a 1983 sidewalk mosaic by Lilli Ann Killen Rosenberg, installed outside Boston's Old City Hall, in the U.S. state of Massachusetts.

== Description and history ==
The mosaic is made of ceramic, bronze, stone, brick, and concrete, and measures approximately 25 x 25 x 25 ft. It was surveyed as part of the Smithsonian Institution's "Save Outdoor Sculpture!" program in 1996. The survey's description for the artwork reads, "A sidewalk mosaic depicting a hopscotch diagram containing illustrations of children playing various games. The scenes depict children flying kites, jumping rope, rolling hoops, playing marbles, turning cartwheels, swinging from trees, chasing each other, drawing, etc. The mosaic is bordered with a row of bricks and contains an inscription commemorating Boston's Latin School."

An inscription reads: "SCHOOL STREET BOSTON SITE OF THE OLDEST / PUBLIC SCHOOL IN THE UNITED STATES / FOUNDED 1635 / LATIN SCHOOL / "AGREED WITH MR. JOHN BARNERD / AS FOLLOWETH HE TO BUILD / A NEW SCHOOL HOUSE OF / FORTY FOOT LONG, TWENTY / FIVE FOOT WIDE & ELEVEN / FOOT STUD WITH EIGHT / WINDOWS BELOW & FIVE IN THE ROOF" / RECORD COMMISSIONERS / REPORT PSG VOL XI 1704 / "EXPERIENCE KEEPS / A DEAR SCHOOL, BUT / FOOLS WILL LEARN / IN NO OTHER" / BENJAMIN FRANKLIN / OTHER ALUMNI INCLUDE / SAMUEL ADAMS, JOHN HANCOCK / CHARLES BULFINCH AND/RALPH WALDO EMERSON. LABOR OMNIA VINCIT. OMNIBUS OPPORTUNITAS / ARCHITECTURE HERITAGE FOUNDATION / CITY CARPET 1983. THE TOWNSCAPE INSTITUTE / ARTIST: LILLI ANN KILLEN ROSENBERG".
