= Massachusetts Fallen Firefighters Memorial =

Sculpture in Boston, Massachusetts, U.S.

Coordinates: 42.358761°N 71.063182°W

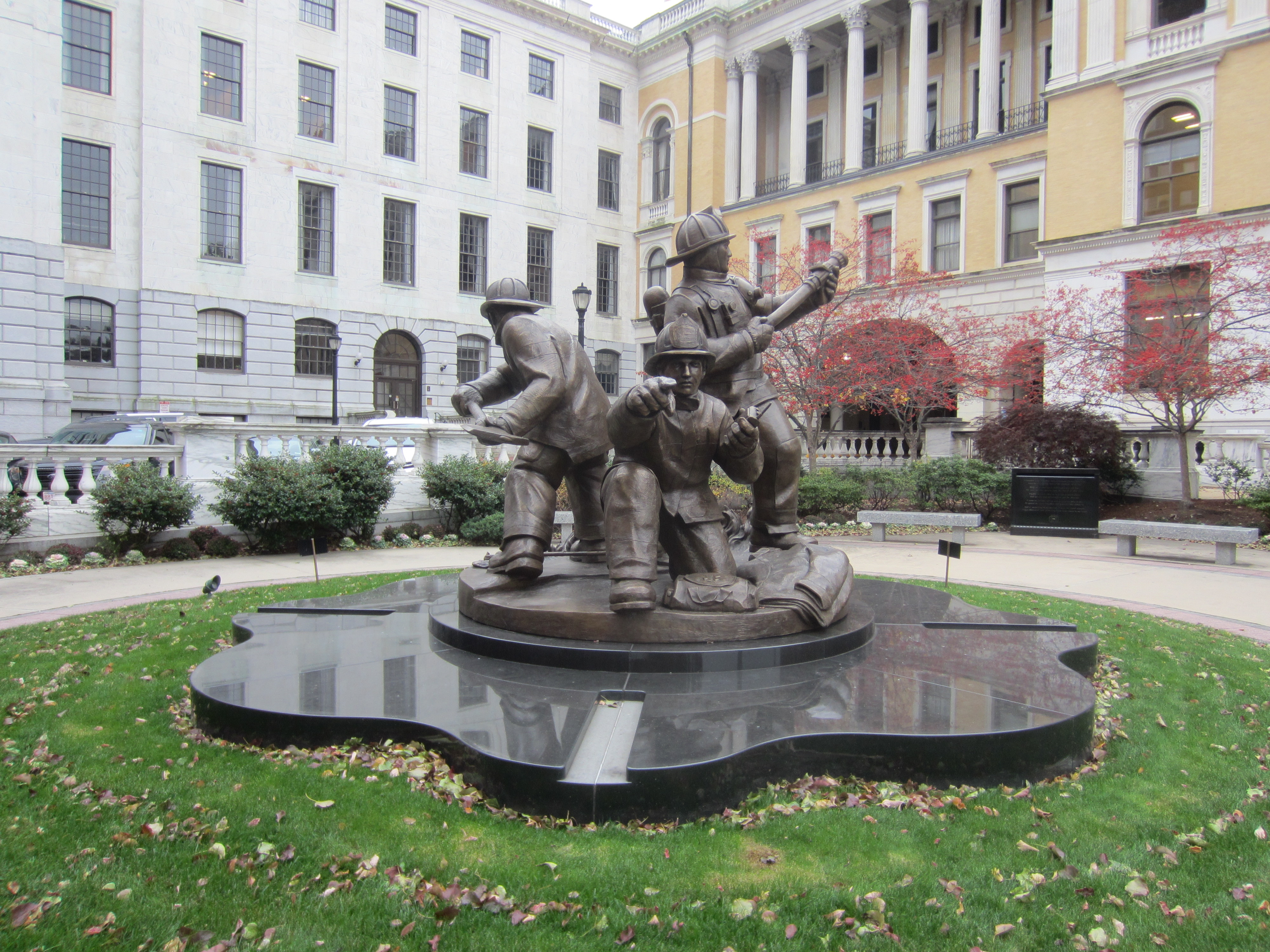
The memorial in 2019

The Massachusetts Fallen Firefighters Memorial is a memorial in Boston's Beacon Hill neighborhood, in the U.S. state of Massachusetts. The memorial was dedicated in 2007, and displayed 870 names, as of September 2014.
