= China Trade Gate =

Paifang in Boston, Massachusetts, U.S.

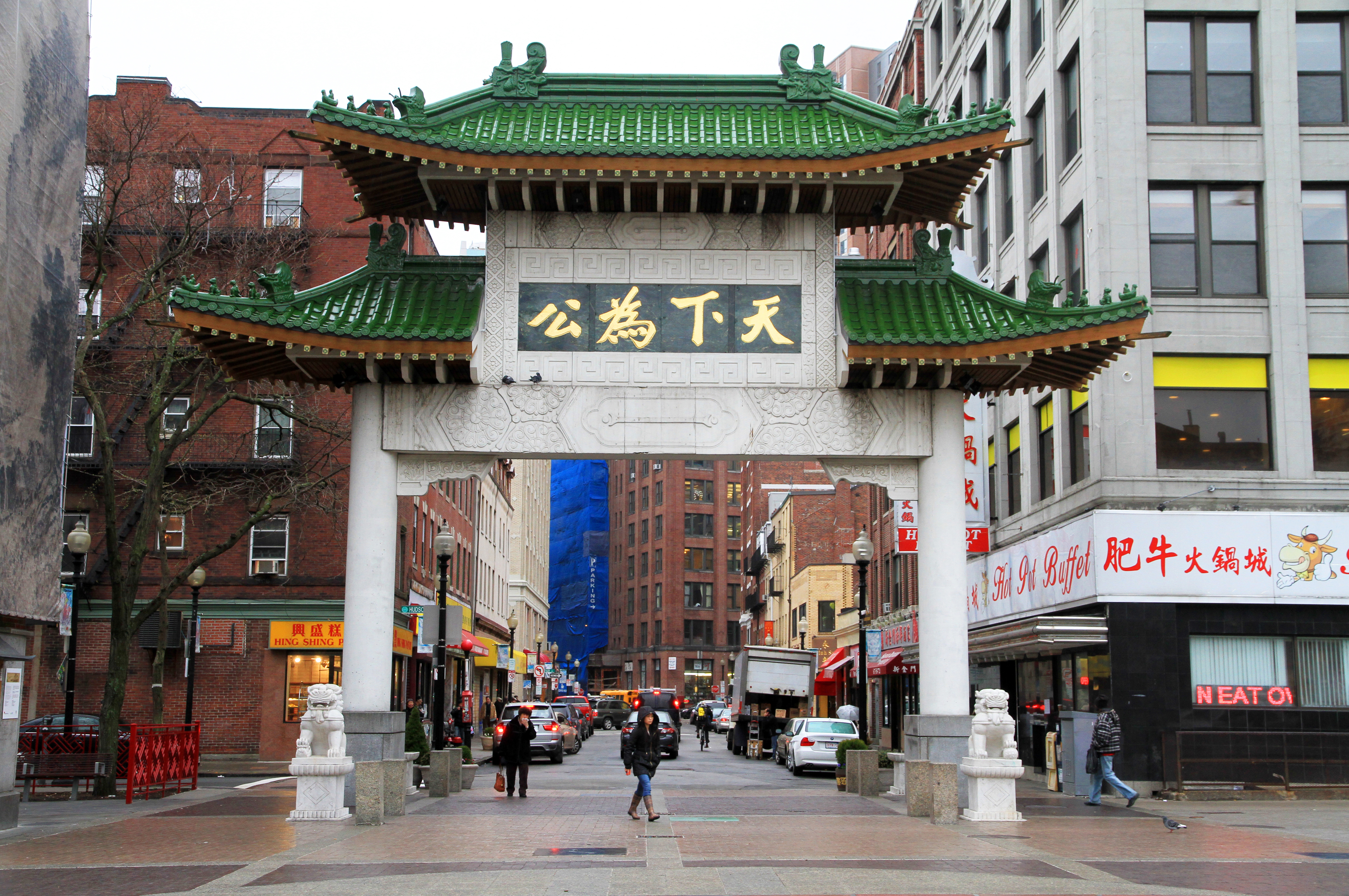
- Artist: David Judelson
- Year: 1988
- Dimensions: 8.8 m × 6.7 m (29 ft × 22 ft)
- Location: Boston, Massachusetts, U.S.
- 42°21′04″N 71°03′35″W

China Trade Gate is a paifang archway at the Beach Street entrance to the Chinatown neighborhood of Boston, Massachusetts, United States. It was designed by David Judelson and was originally donated to the city by the government of Taiwan in 1982.

== Description and history ==
The work, made of painted steel tubing on a concrete base, was commissioned by the China Trade Center, installed in 1988, and rededicated in 1990. It was surveyed by the Smithsonian Institution's "Save Outdoor Sculpture!" program in 1995.

== Gallery ==
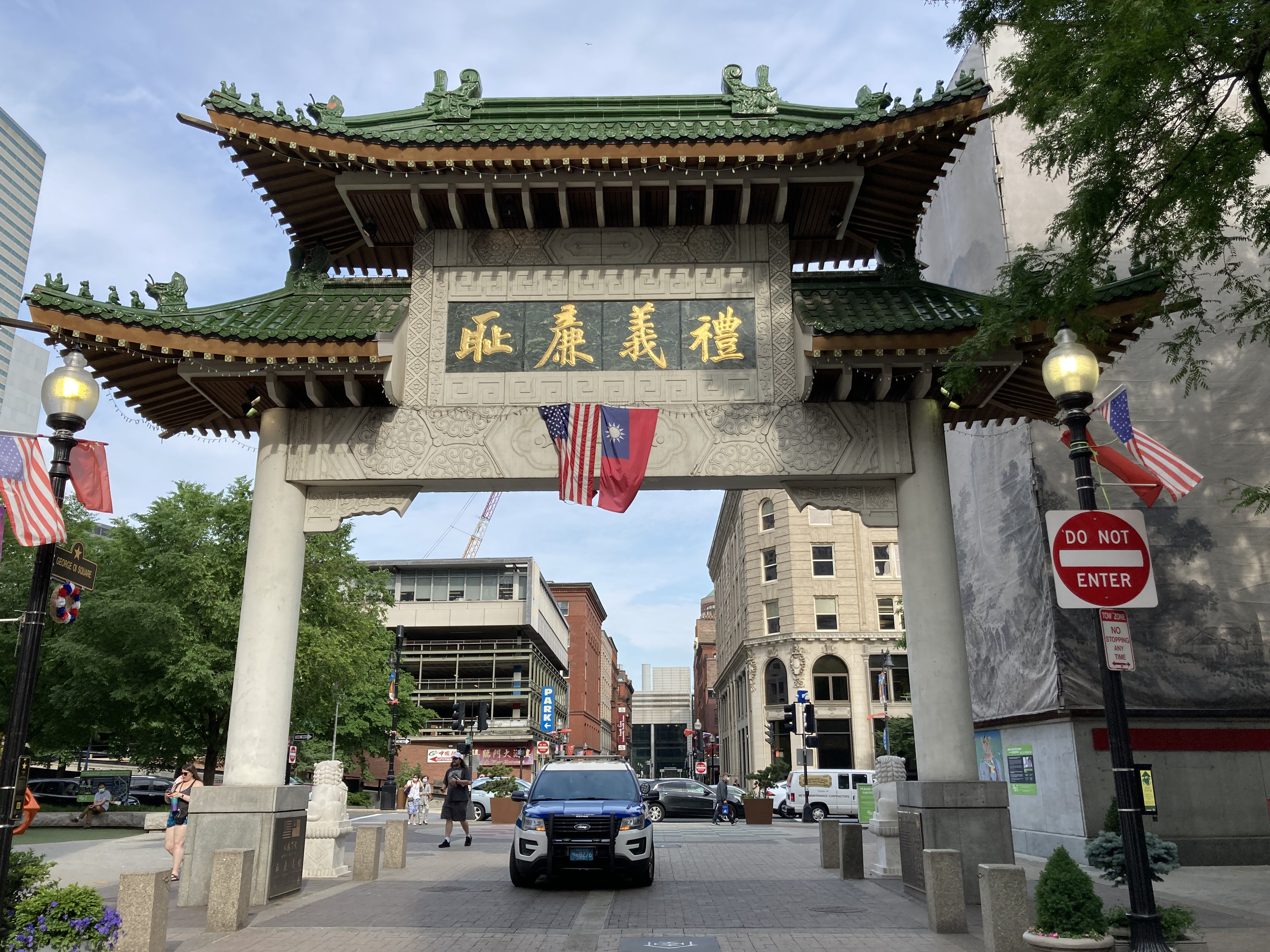
Back side of the gate

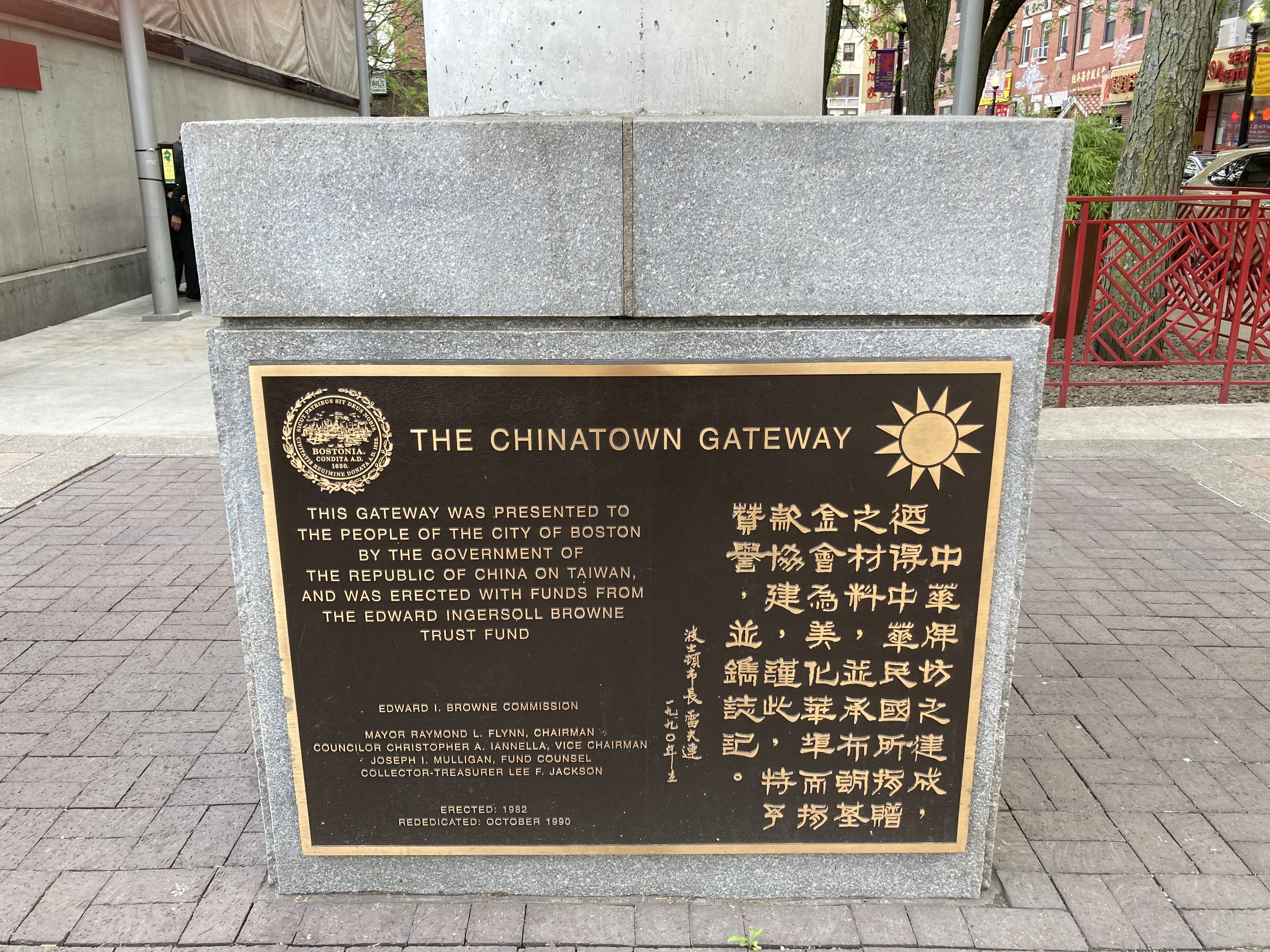
Plaque below the gate

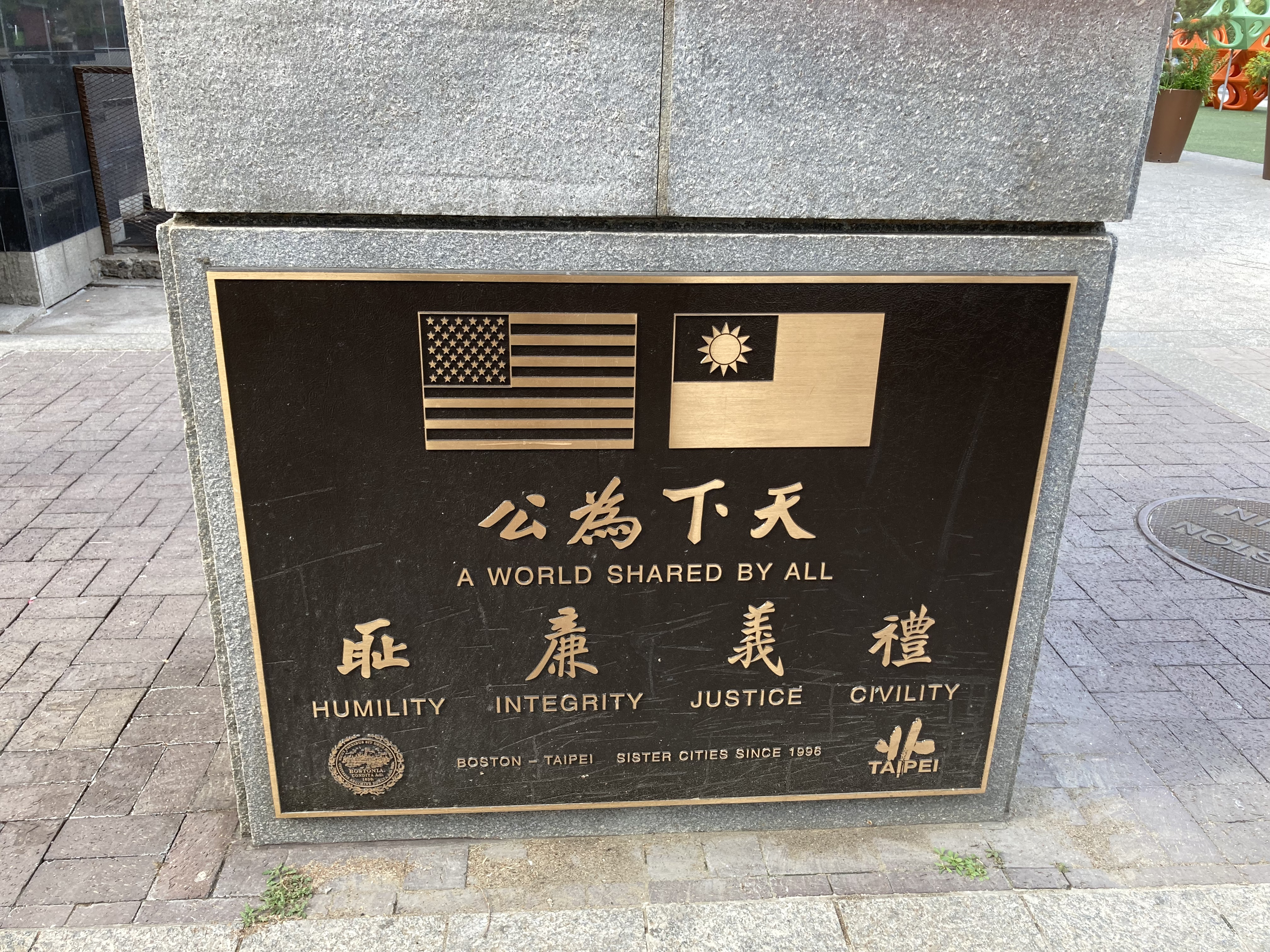
Plaque below the gate showing the national flags of the United States and Republic of China (Taiwan)
