= Massachusetts Law Enforcement Memorial =

Memorial in Boston, Massachusetts, U.S.

Coordinates: 42°21′33.4″N 71°3′48″W

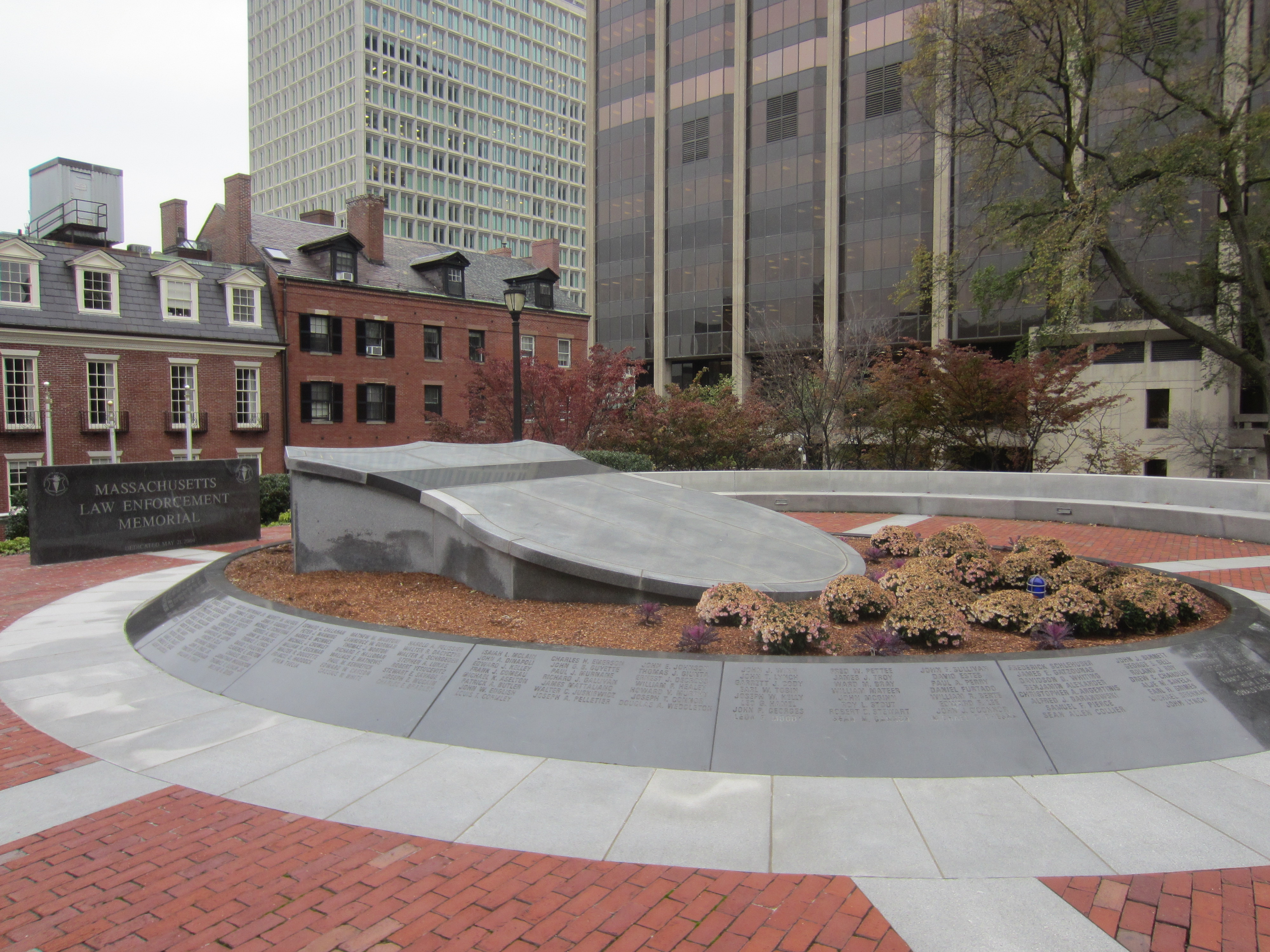
- Interactive map of Massachusetts Law Enforcement Memorial
- Designer: Michael Kenny,
- Type: Sculpture
- Material: Stone
- Dedicated to: Law enforcement

The Massachusetts Law Enforcement Memorial is a memorial installed in Boston's Beacon Hill neighborhood, in the U.S. state of Massachusetts. The memorial that was first displayed in 2004, sculpted by Michael Kenny, features a stone in the shape of a badge, a circular stone disk, and inscriptions of the names of law enforcement officials. Inscribed on the memorial, there are more than 340 names of law enforcement officers who died in the line of duty.
