= Statue of George S. Patton (Boston) =

Statue in Boston, Massachusetts, U.S.

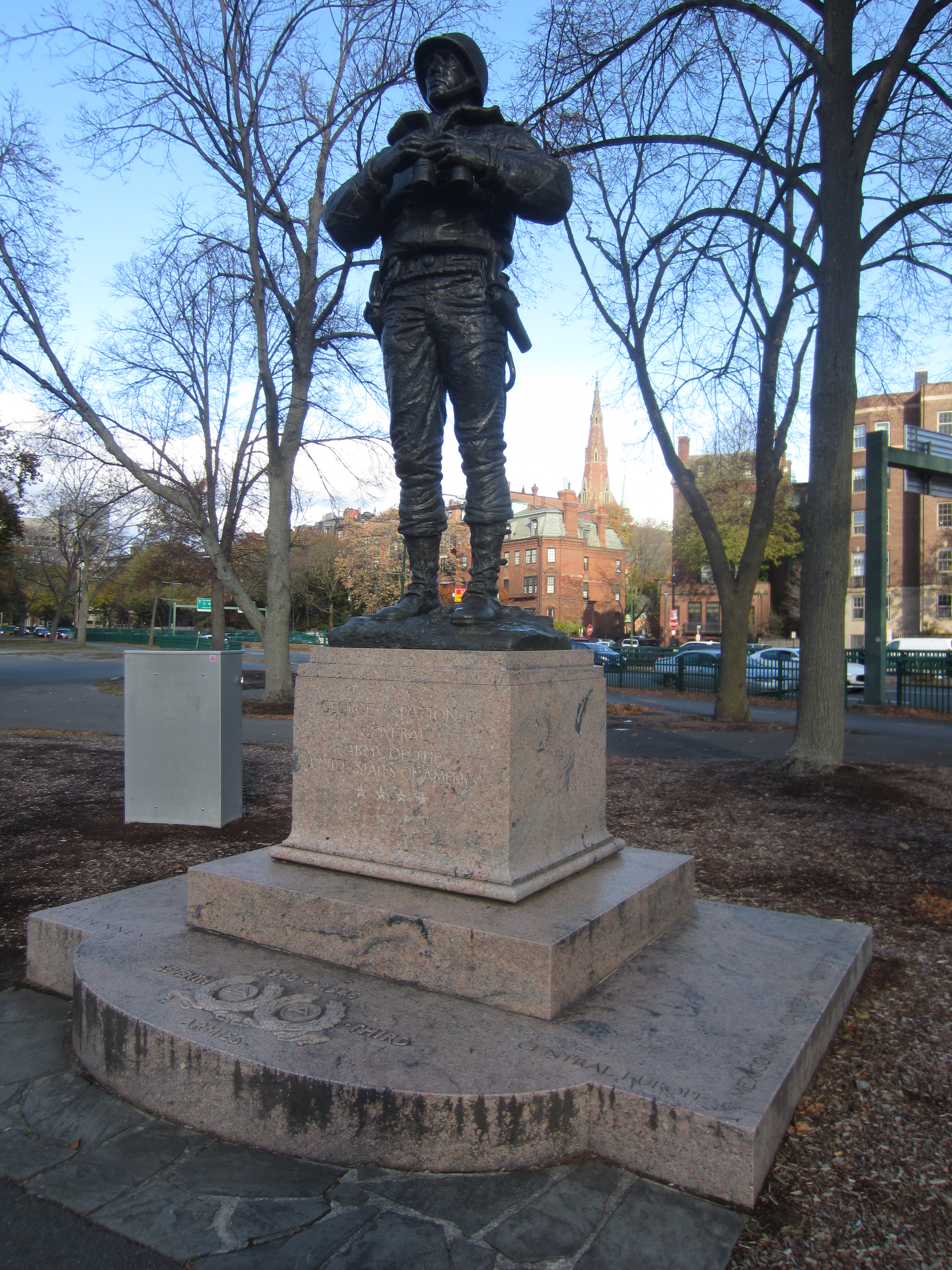
- The statue in 2019
- Artist: James Earle Fraser
- Year: 1953
- Medium: Bronze sculpture
- Subject: George S. Patton
- Location: 42°21′25.1″N 71°4′24.4″W

A 1953 statue of George S. Patton by James Earle Fraser (sometimes called General George Smith Patton, Jr.) is installed along Boston's Charles River Esplanade, in the U.S. state of Massachusetts.

== Description and history ==
The bronze sculpture measures approximately 8 x 3 x 3 ft., and rests on a pink granite base that measures approximately 4 x 10 x 7 ft. It commemorates the general's June 7, 1945 address delivered from the Hatch Memorial Shell before a crowd of 20,000.

The work was surveyed as part of the Smithsonian Institution's "Save Outdoor Sculpture!" program in 1997.

== See also ==
- 1953 in art
