= Statue of Edward Everett =

Statue in Boston, Massachusetts, U.S.

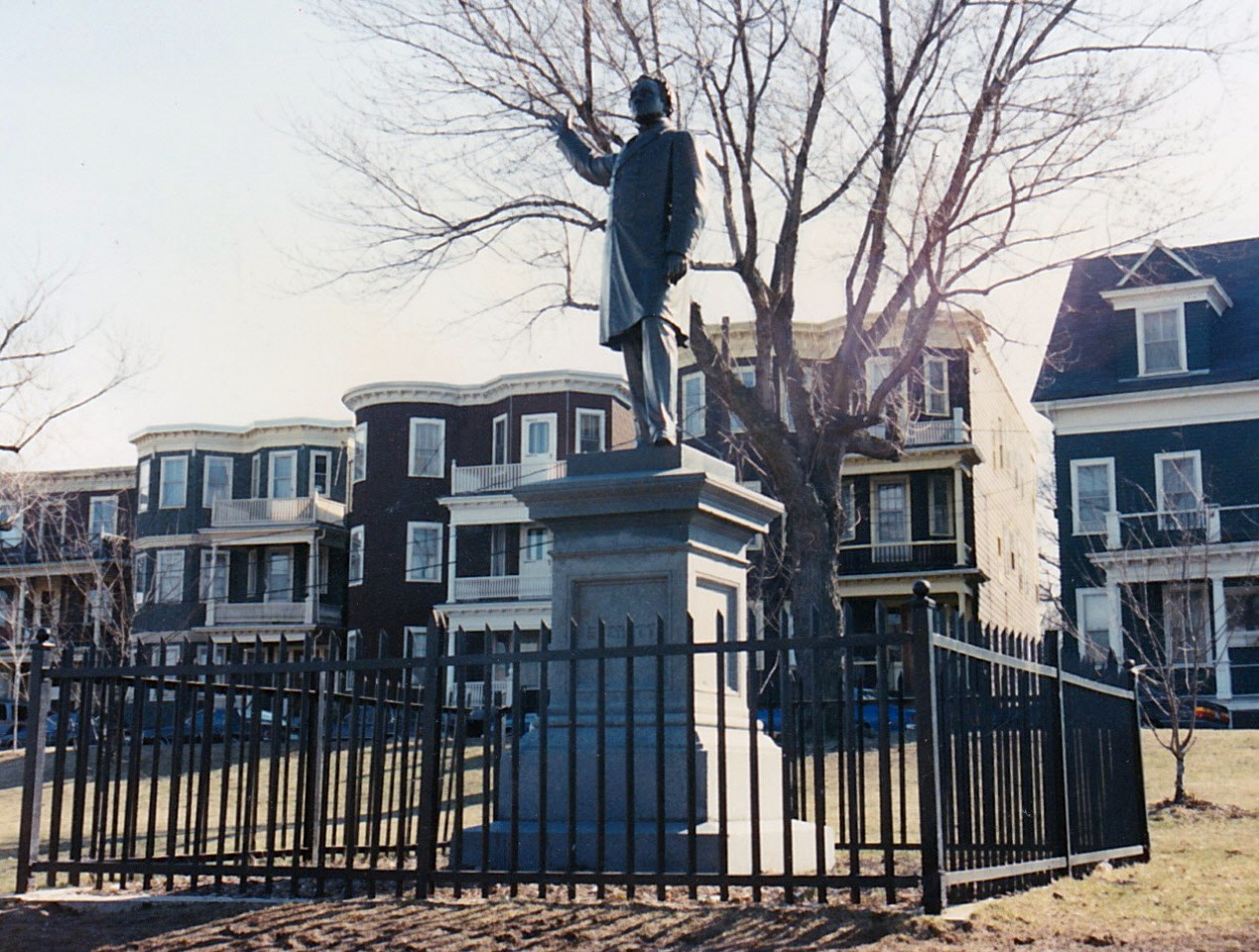
- Artist: William Wetmore Story
- Year: 1867
- Medium: Bronze sculpture
- Subject: Edward Everett
- Dimensions: 2.1 m × 1.2 m × 0.76 m (7 ft × 4 ft × 2.5 ft)
- Location: Boston, Massachusetts, U.S.; 42°19′11.4″N 71°3′37.4″W

A statue of politician, diplomat, and orator Edward Everett by William Wetmore Story is installed in Boston's Richardson Park, in the U.S. state of Massachusetts.

== Description ==
The bronze sculpture measures approximately 7 x 4 x 2.5 ft. and rests on a granite base that measures approximately 7 x 5.5 x 5.5 ft.

== History ==
The statue was modeled in 1866, cast the following year, and installed in Boston Public Garden on November 18, 1867. It was relocated to Edward Everett Square in 1911. In 1931, the work was placed in storage for four years before being installed in Richardson Park in 1935.

The memorial was surveyed by the Smithsonian Institution’s "Save Outdoor Sculpture!" program in 1993.
