= Hungarian Revolution Memorial =

Sculpture in Boston, Massachusetts, U.S.

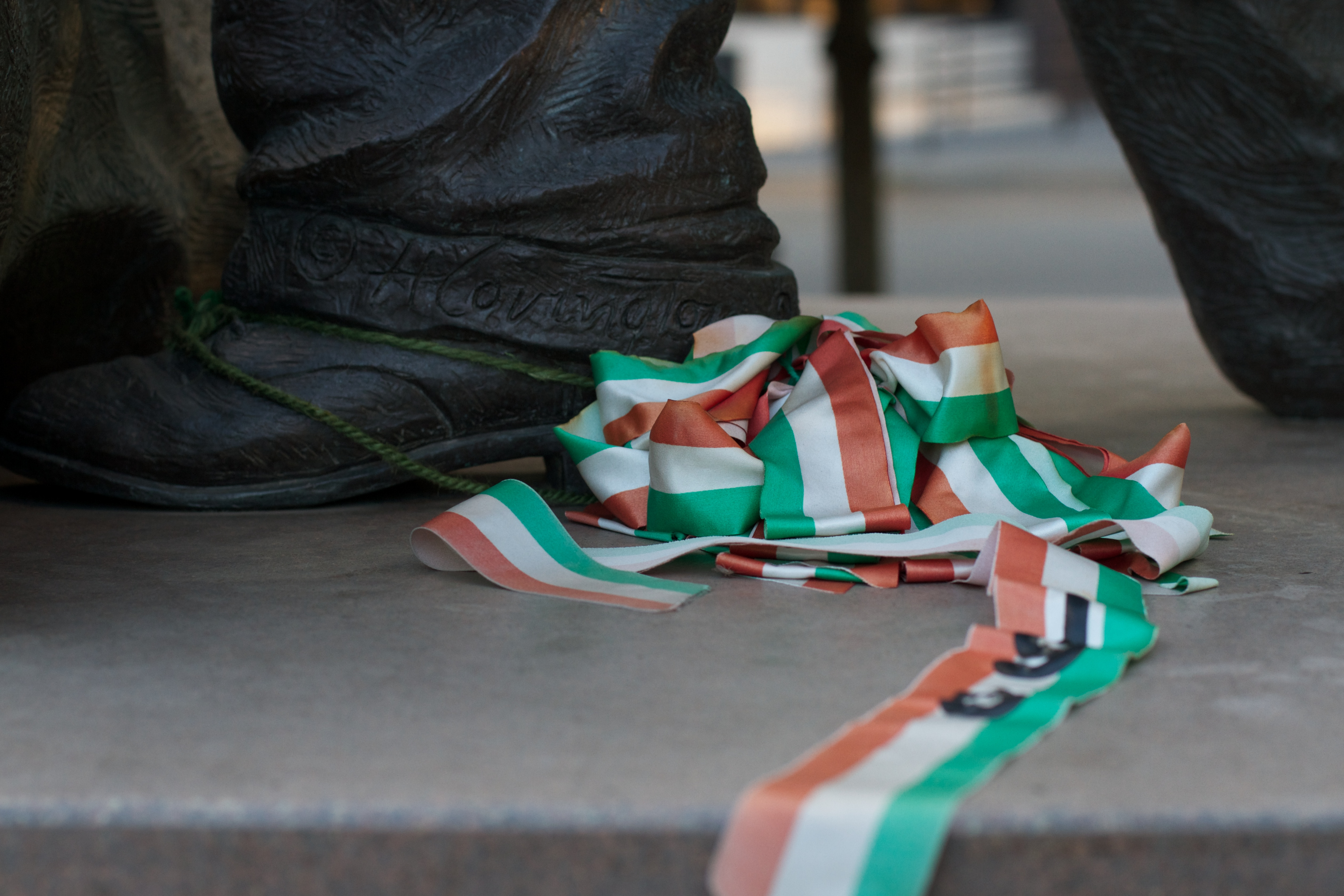
- Artist: E. Gyuri Hollosy
- Medium: Bronze; granite; stainless steel
- Location: Boston, Massachusetts, U.S.; 42°21′28″N 71°03′19″W

The Hungarian Revolution Memorial (also known as Hungarian Monument) is a monument and sculpture by E. Gyuri Hollosy, installed in Boston's Liberty Square Park, in the U.S. state of Massachusetts. It commemorates the thirtieth anniversary of the Hungarian Revolution of 1956.

== Description ==
The memorial depicts a nude woman holding her baby, a fallen Hungarian soldier, and multiple heads representing the students who died during the revolution. The bronze sculpture over a stainless steel armature is approximately 16 ft., 4 in. tall. It rests on a granite base that is approximately 30 in. tall, with a diameter of 8 ft.

== History ==
The monument was commissioned by the Hungarian Society of Massachusetts to commemorate the thirtieth anniversary of the Hungarian Revolution of 1956. It was originally dedicated on October 23, 1986, but was dismantled during November 15–16, 1986, and stored until May 1989. The work was rededicated after Liberty Square Park's plaza opened. It was surveyed by the Smithsonian Institution's "Save Outdoor Sculpture!" program in 1993.
