= Statue of John Winthrop (Boston) =

Statue by Richard Saltonstall Greenough

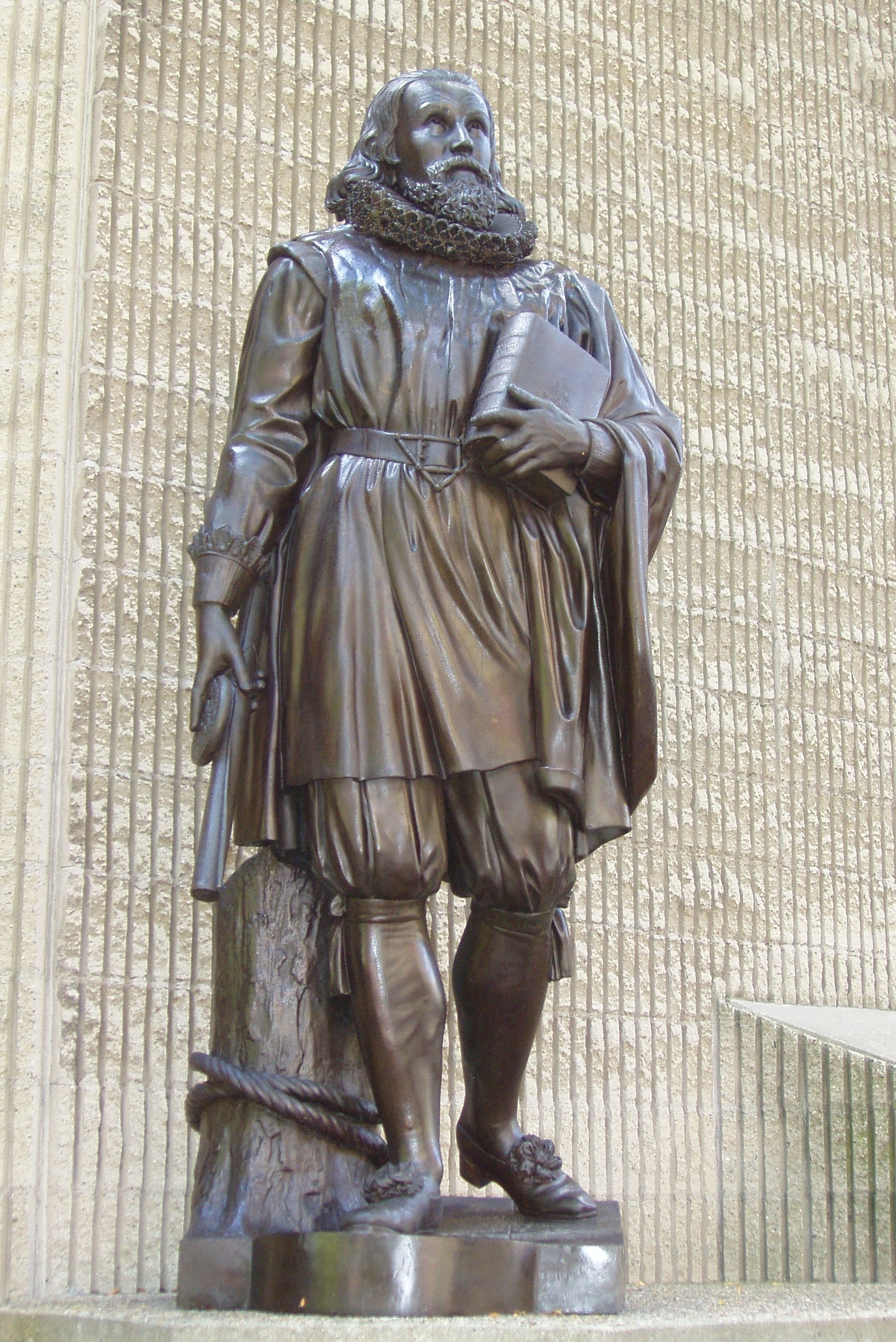
- Artist: Richard Saltonstall Greenough
- Medium: Bronze sculpture
- Subject: John Winthrop
- Location: Boston, Massachusetts, U.S.; 42°21′13.6″N 71°4′30.1″W

A statue of John Winthrop by Richard Saltonstall Greenough (sometimes called John Winthrop or Governor Winthrop) is installed outside Boston's First Church, in the U.S. state of Massachusetts.

== Description ==
The bronze sculpture of Winthrop holding a book, a scroll, and the great seal measures approximately 7 ft. x 2 ft. 5 in. x 2 ft. 3 in. It rests on a textured concrete base that measures approximately 4 ft. 6 in. x 4 ft. x 8 ft. The statue is a replica of Greenough's marble sculpture installed in the United States Capitol's National Statuary Hall, in Washington, D.C., as part of the National Statuary Hall Collection. It cost $15,000 and was appropriated by the City of Boston.

An inscription on the front of the base reads: JOHN WINTHROP / FIRST GOVERNOR OF MASSACHUSETTS BAY COLONY / ONE OF THE FOUNDERS / OF BOSTON / AND OF THE / FIRST CHURCH IN BOSTON / A.D. 1630.

== History ==
The statue was modeled in 1873 and cast in 1880. It was originally installed in Scollay Square (now known as Government Center), before being relocated to First Church in 1904. In 1968, a fire broke out at First Church, and the sculpture was toppled by collapsed walls. The statue's head was severed. It was put in storage in Quincy, Massachusetts, while the church was rebuilt. The memorial was reinstalled in 1975. It was surveyed by the Smithsonian Institution's "Save Outdoor Sculpture!" program in 1993.
