= World War II Memorial (Charlestown, Boston) =

War memorial in Boston, Massachusetts, U.S.

Coordinates: 42°22′17.4″N 71°3′44.3″W

- United States of America
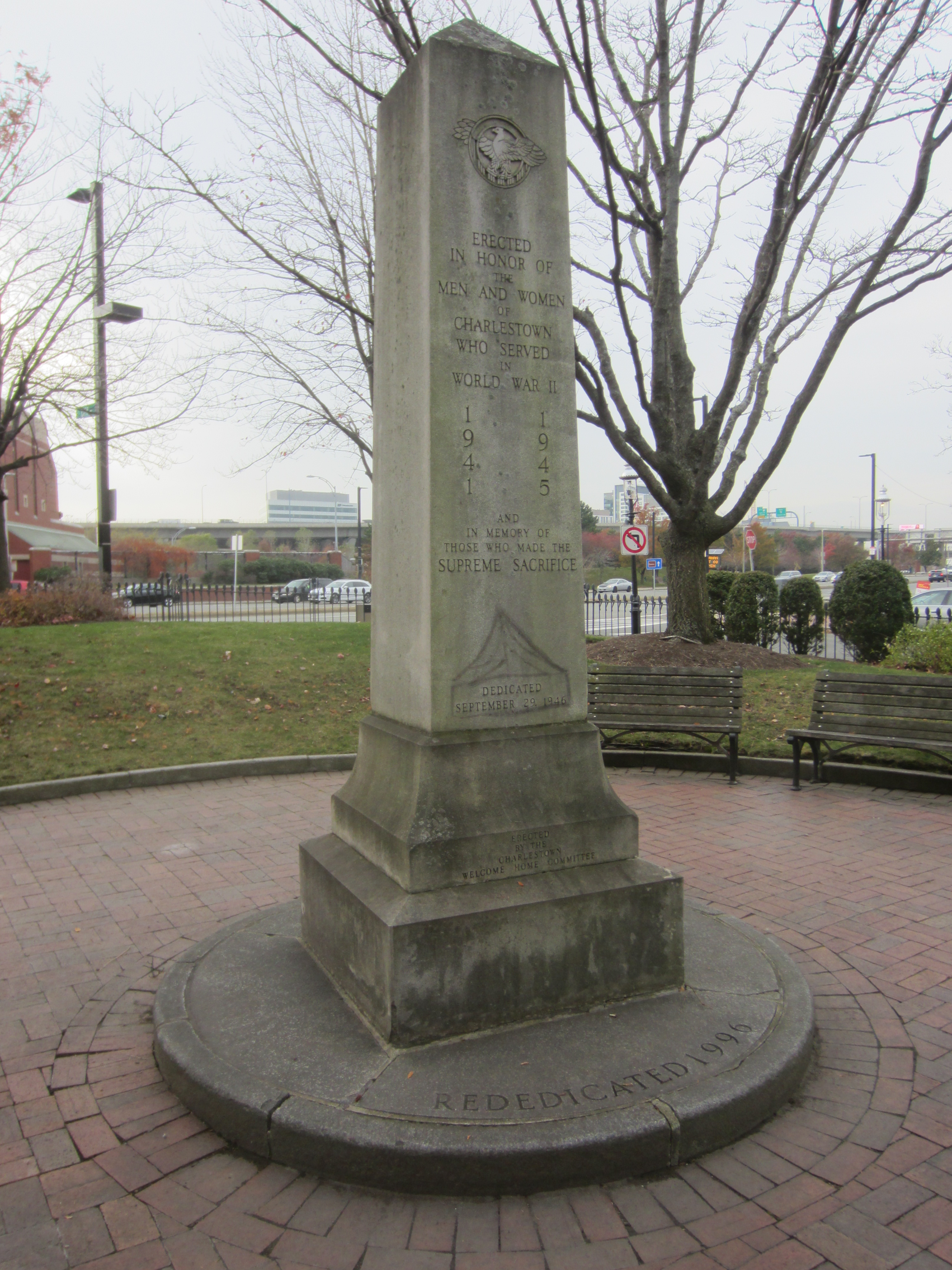
- The monument in 2019
- For casualties of the Second World War
- Unveiled: 1946; 80 years ago
- Location: Charlestown, Boston, Massachusetts
- Erected In honor of The Men and womenOf Charlestown Who Served In World war ii 1941 - 1945 And In memory of Those who made the Supreme sacrifice

The World War II Memorial is installed in City Square Park, in Charlestown, Boston, Massachusetts, United States.

The memorial was dedicated in 1946 and rededicated in 1996.

== See also ==
- 1946 in art
