= Massachusetts Korean War Memorial =

War memorial in Boston, Massachusetts, U.S.

Coordinates: 42.374422°N 71.053543°W

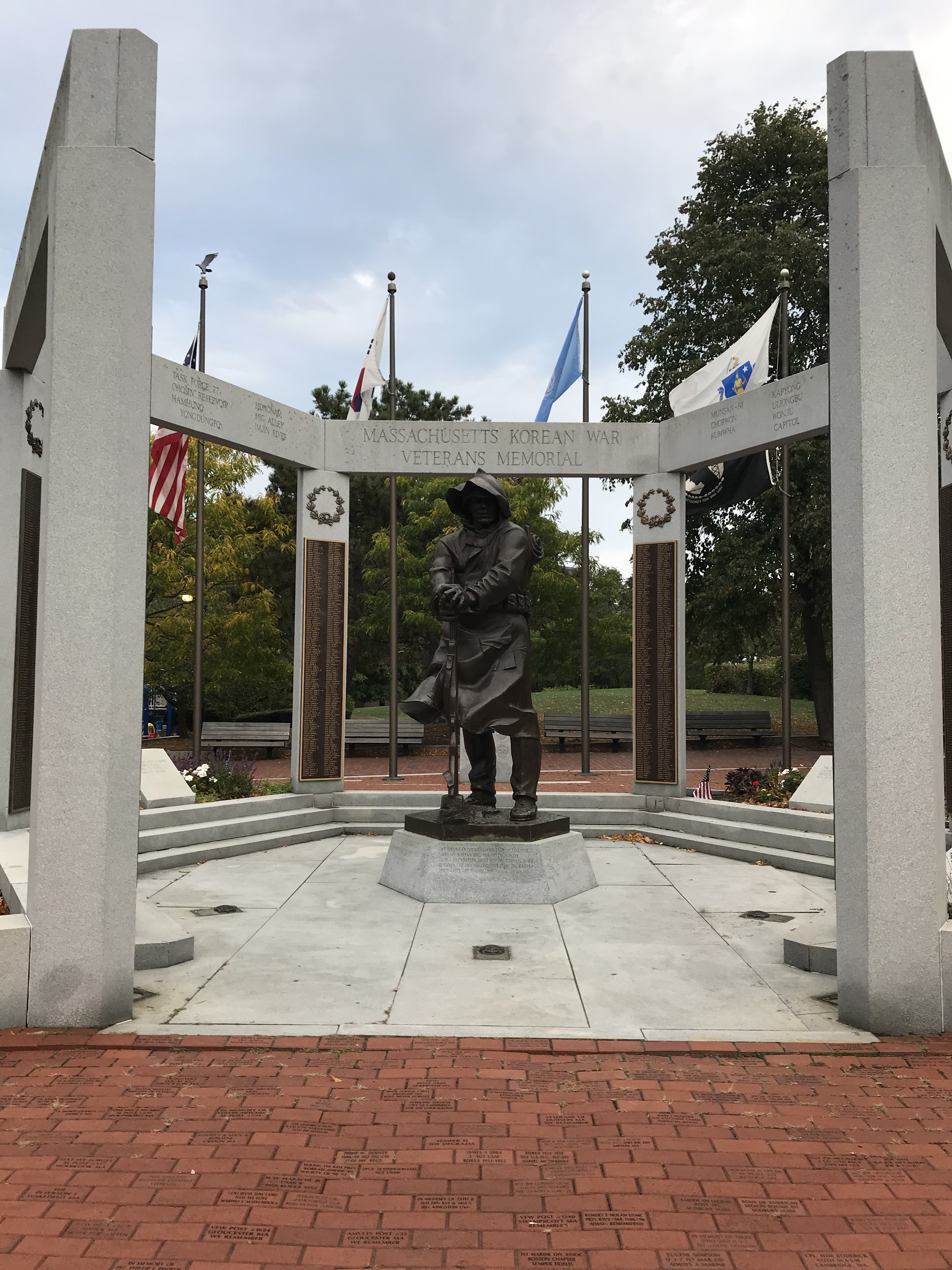
- Interactive map of Massachusetts Korean War Memorial
- Location: Charlestown, Boston Charlestown Naval Shipyard Park, United States
- Type: War memorial
- Material: Bronze and granite sculpture
- Opening date: 1993
- Dedicated to: Those who served in the Korean War

The Massachusetts Korean War Memorial is installed in Charlestown, Boston's Charlestown Naval Shipyard Park, within the Boston Navy Yard, in the U.S. state of Massachusetts. The 1993 memorial was commissioned by the Massachusetts Korean War Veterans Committee. It features a bronze sculpture of a soldier on a granite base. The memorial was surveyed by the Smithsonian Institution's "Save Outdoor Sculpture!" program in 1997.
