= Religious Zionists of America =

Organization

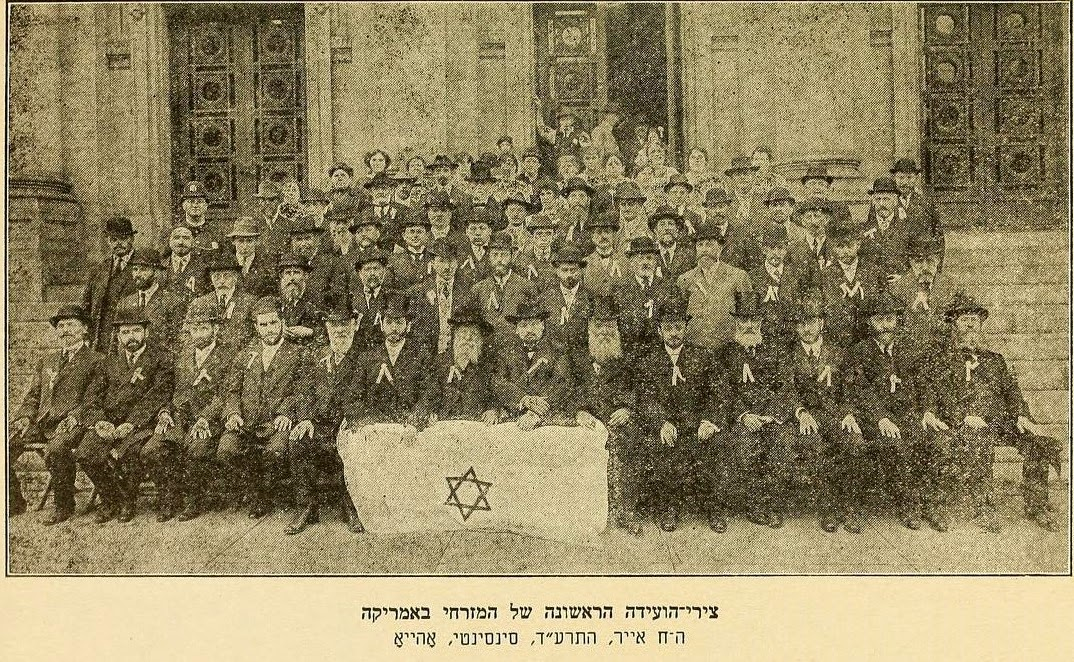
Representatives at the first conference of Mizrachi in America, 1914

The Religious Zionists of America (Hebrew official name: Religious Zionists of America/Mizrachi-Hapoel Hamizrachi, also known as Mizrachi, is an American-based organization that is the official body for those, mostly Modern Orthodox Jews who identify with Religious Zionism and support the goals of the general Mizrachi movement in America, Europe and Israel.

Mizrachi (a Hebrew abbreviation of merkaz ruchani – "spiritual center") was founded by Rabbi Isaac Jacob Reines in 1902 to serve as an umbrella organization for the Religious Zionist movement. In 1914, at a national conference in Cincinnati, Rabbi Meir Berlin (Bar-Ilan) oversaw the establishment of the American branch of the World Movement. The movement is inspired by the slogans of Mizrachi, "The Land of Israel, for the People of Israel, According to the Torah of Israel," and Hapoel Hamizrachi, "Torah Va’Avodah" (Torah and Labor).

Most rabbis affiliated with Modern Orthodoxy's Rabbinical Council of America (RCA), who are mostly alumni of Yeshiva University's (YU) Rabbi Isaac Elchanan Theological Seminary (RIETS) are active members and leaders in the RZA so that there is a strong correlation of leadership between YU, the RCA, Mizrachi in general, and the RZA.

In honor of the 70th anniversary of the founding of the State of Israel, RZA partnered with World Mizrachi to bring 70 scholars to 70 communities in the United States. Named "70 for 70" this program had a significant impact on communities across the United States and reintroduced thousands of people to the RZA.

The RZA works on common Zionist agendas with similar non-Orthodox and non-religious organizations, such as the Zionist Organization of America, the Conference of Presidents of Major American Jewish Organizations, the American Israel Public Affairs Committee, B'nai B'rith, United Jewish Appeal, the Jewish National Fund and others.

The president of the RZA is Stephen Flatow, and the chairman is Martin Oliner. The executive director is Alicia Post.

== See also ==
- Bnei Akiva
- Mizrachi (political party)
- Mizrachi (Religious Zionism)
- Hapoel HaMizrachi
- Modern Orthodox Judaism
- National Religious Party
- Religious Zionism
