= Charlestown Ropewalk =

Last standing ropewalk facility in the US

Coordinates: 42°22′35.96″N 71°3′15.95″W

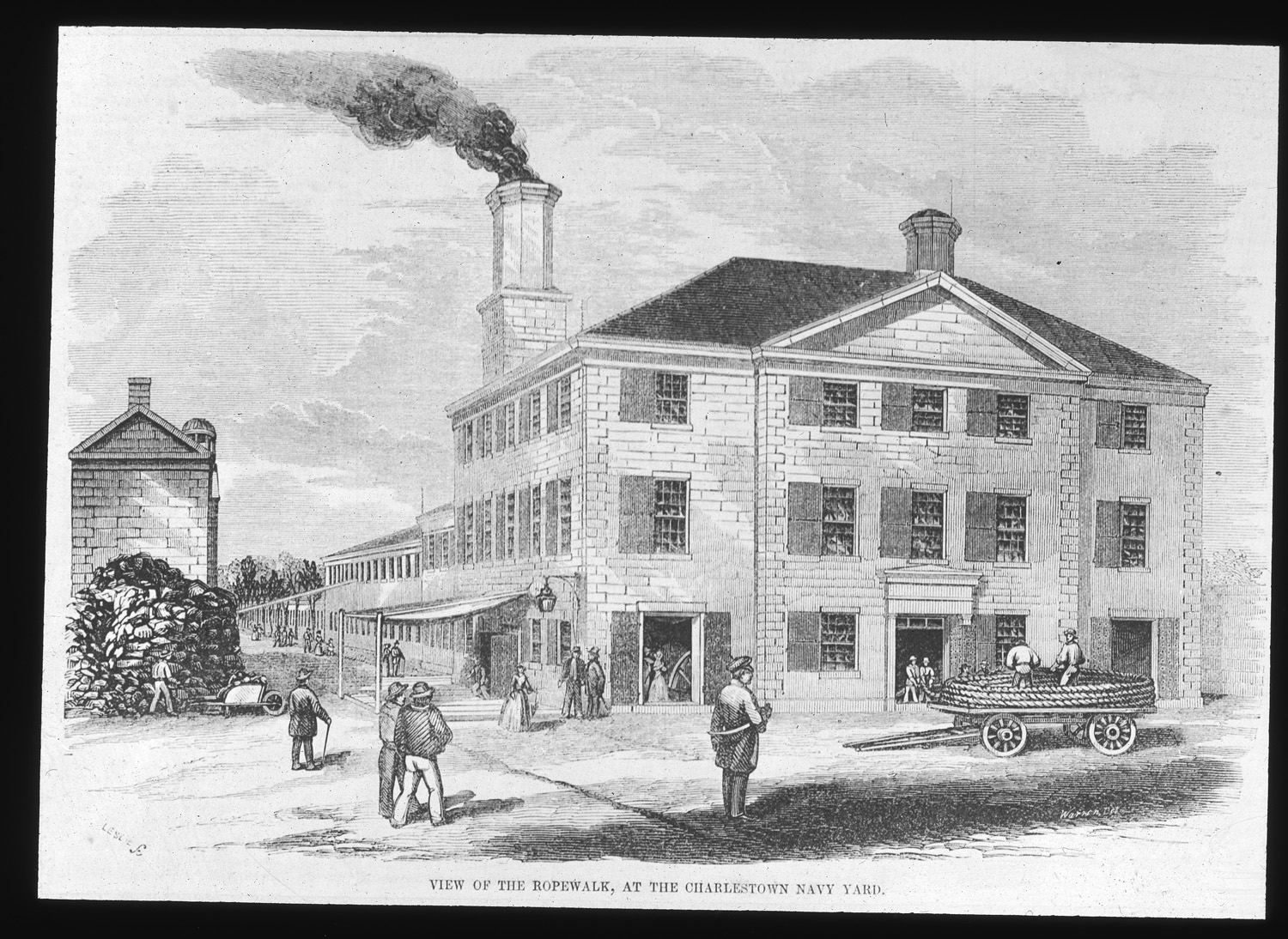
Charlestown Navy Yard Ropewalk 1852

The Charlestown Ropewalk is a former ropewalk facility located in Charlestown, Massachusetts, at the former Boston Navy Yard. At over 1,300 feet (400 m) long, it is the only standing ropewalk facility still existent in the United States.

The ropewalk building was constructed between 1834 and 1837. It was designed by Alexander Parris, who also designed much of the rest of the Charlestown Navy Yard, and other landmarks throughout Massachusetts. From its opening in 1838 until its closing in 1970, it made most of the cordage used by the United States Navy. When the Navy Yard was closed in 1973, the building was acquired by the Boston Redevelopment Authority.

Since its closure in the 1970s, the building has mostly sat empty. In recent years, developers have made plans to turn the ropewalk into apartments. As of December 2018, plans have been approved, but no construction had started until 2019. A Philadelphia firm, Vision Properties, has teamed up with the Frontier Enterprises to renovate this historic building into 97 residential apartment units. Of the 97 units, approximately 20 units will be affordable housing units. Renovations has begun and is expected to be completed by the end of 2019. Apartment types will include studios, one and two bedrooms. Leasing activities has begun as well. There is a 3,000 sf commercial unit for lease. The Parks Service will also have a museum of artifacts from the Rope company within the building. The Ropewalk Apartments was completed in 2021. In 2024, the Boston Landmarks Commission designated it as a Boston Landmark; the designation had been pending since 1988.
