= Charlestown Naval Shipyard Park =

Park in Boston, Massachusetts, U.S.

- Interactive map of Charlestown Naval Shipyard Park
- Type: Park
- Location: Boston Navy Yard, Charlestown
- Nearest city: Boston, Massachusetts, U.S.
- Coordinates: 42°22′27″N 71°03′11″W
- Area: 11.06-acre (4.48 ha)

Charlestown Naval Shipyard Park is an 11.06-acre (4.48 ha) park in Charlestown's Boston Navy Yard, in the U.S. state of Massachusetts. The Massachusetts Korean War Memorial is installed in the park. The Charlestown Navy Yard Ferry Terminal extends out from the south side of the park.

The Anchor and Navy Yard Commons opened in May 2019.
