= Martin Oliner =

American attorney, former politician, and Zionist activist

Mayor of Lawrence, New York
- In office 2010–2016

Personal details
- Born: 1947 (age 78–79) Germany
- Spouse: Reva Oliner
- Education: J.D., New York University
- Occupation: tax attorney, chair of Religious Zionists of America

Martin Oliner is an American attorney, former politician, and chairman of the Religious Zionists of America.

== Early life and family ==
Oliner was born in 1947 in a displaced persons camp in Germany after his parents survived the Holocaust. He grew up in Brooklyn and received his JD from New York University. He is married.

== Career ==
Oliner has been a tax attorney since 1972 and CEO of First Lincoln, an investment firm, since the 1990s.

=== Boston Navy Yard ===
In the 1990s, Oliner acquired development rights in the Boston Navy Yard through his company, LDA Acquisitions. In 1997, he filed a proposal to build a 260-unit apartment building that became known as the HarborView Place condominiums. The project was delayed due to local opposition and the city approval process. A slightly smaller version of the project was approved by the city around 2003, and construction was completed four years later. In 2012, Oliner's company, Shipyard Quarters Marina Inc, was cited by the Massachusetts Department of Environmental Protection for "dilapidated and unsafe elements" at Pier 8 in the Boston Navy Yard. By 2013, Oliner had accrued $6 million in fines. In October 2014, Oliner reached a settlement with the city to sell the property and pay a fine of $250,000.

=== Politics and philanthropy ===
Oliner served as mayor of the village of Lawrence, New York, from 2010 to 2016. After Hurricane Sandy in 2012, he criticized the state and county government's relief efforts and organized a letter with other local mayors asking Government Andrew Cuomo for assistance. A Touro University trustee, he donated money to establish the Disaster Relief Clinic at Touro Law Center to provide legal advice to people affected by the hurricane. Oliner was a board member of the Peninsula Hospital in Far Rockaway, New York City and attempted to save it from bankruptcy with a $5 million loan in 2011. The hospital shut down the following year.

Oliner is the chairman of the Religious Zionists of America, a conservative, Orthodox Jewish organization. He spearheaded a 2016 campaign to preserve the historical home of Religious Zionist rabbi Abraham Kook. He advocated for Donald Trump to move the US embassy from Tel Aviv to Jerusalem, which Trump did in 2018, and supported Trump's 2020 Israel–Palestine peace plan. In 2017 and 2018, Oliner traveled to Qatar on trips organized by Nicolas Muzin, an agent of the Qatari government tasked with improving its relations with the Jewish-American community. He donated an ambulance to Beit El, an Israeli settlement in the West Bank, in 2018.

In 2020, President Donald Trump appointed Oliner to the Holocaust Memorial Council which governs the United States Holocaust Memorial Museum.

Oliner ran for superintendent of Hempstead, New York, in 2026 because of his opposition to a planned 309-unit apartment building in the town.

=== Writing ===
Oliner's writing has appeared in The Jerusalem Post, Algemeiner, and Jewish News Syndicate. In 2022, he wrote a column supporting Bezalel Smotrich and the Religious Zionist Party in the Israeli election. In February 2025 he wrote a column in support of Trump's proposal to relocate Palestinians living in the Gaza Strip. He argued that "The people of Gaza are collectively guilty” for the October 7 attacks, stating that "They are fundamentally evil, and they must pay a price for their actions." In response, the Council on American-Islamic Relations called for him to lose his position on the Holocaust Memorial Council. In June 2025, he wrote a column criticizing the Holocaust Memorial Museum's efforts to fight antisemitism as lacking, stating that they present antisemitism as defunct. He voiced his support for Trump's efforts to revamp the museum.
