= Boston Navy Yard =

Shipyard and building complex in Massachusetts

Boston Naval Shipyard
- Boston, Massachusetts
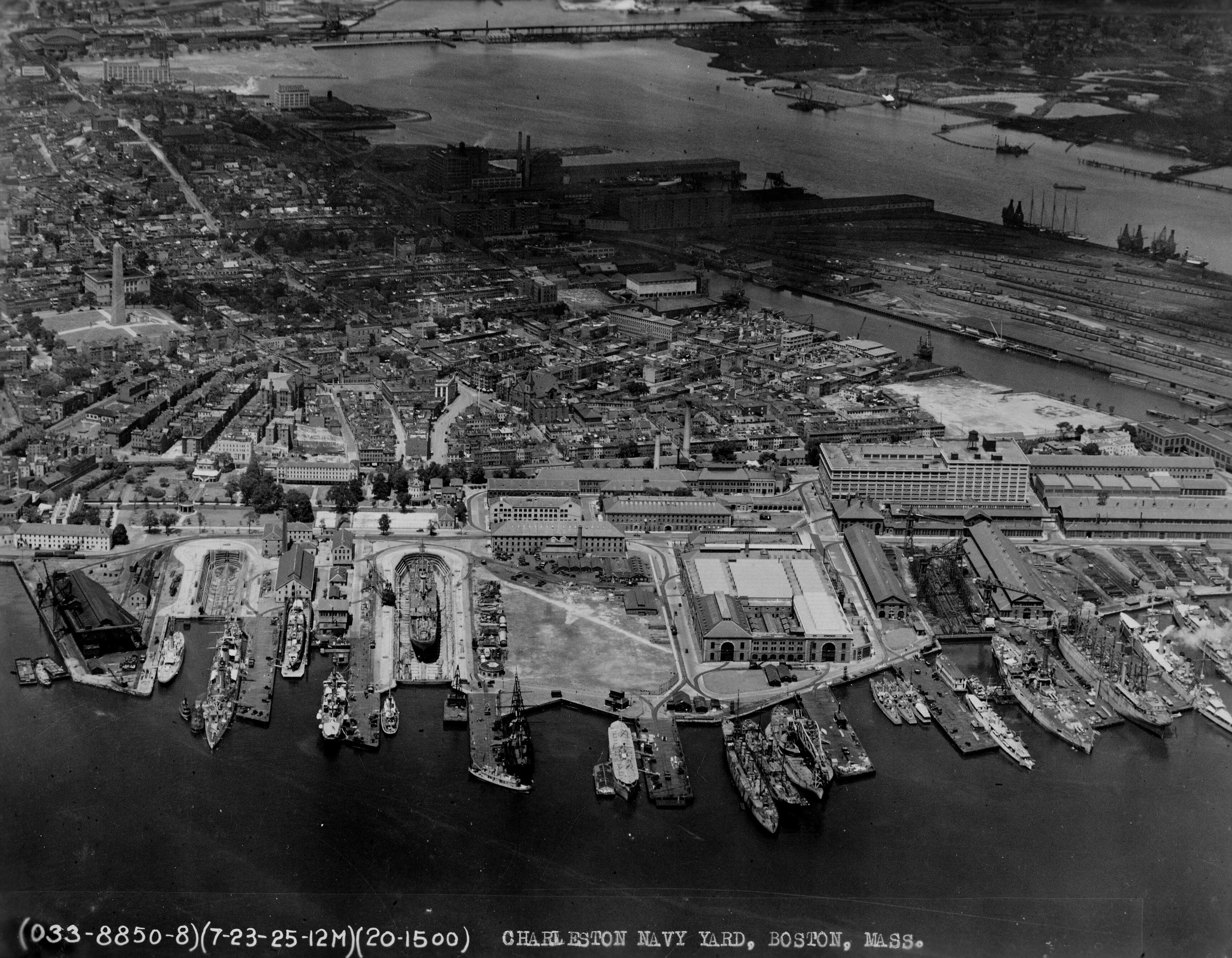
- Boston Navy Yard in the 1930s

Site information
- Type: Shipyard
- Controlled by: United States Navy

Site history
- Built: 1800
- In use: 1801–1975
- Boston Naval Shipyard
- U.S. National Register of Historic Places
- U.S. National Historic Landmark District
- U.S. Historic district – Contributing property
- Location: Southeast of Chelsea Street, Charlestown, Boston, Massachusetts
- Coordinates: 42°22′34″N 71°03′09″W
- Built: 1800
- Architects: Alexander Parris, Joseph E. Billings, et al.
- Part of: Boston National Historical Park (ID74002222)
- NRHP reference No.: 66000134

Significant dates
- Added to NRHP: 13 November 1966
- Designated CP: 26 October 1974

Boston Navy Yard (also known as Charlestown Navy Yard and Boston Naval Shipyard) is a former shipyard in the Charlestown neighborhood of Boston in Massachusetts, United States. One of the first shipbuilding facilities in the United States Navy, it operated from 1800 until 1 July 1974. The National Park Service (NPS) controls 25 acres (10 ha) of the decommissioned yard as part of Boston National Historical Park. Three other sections, totaling about 104 acres (42 ha), are owned by the Boston Planning & Development Agency (BPDA). The site is a National Historic Landmark.

Plans for the yard date from 1799, soon after the Navy was established. Shipbuilding began in 1812, and a master plan in 1828 influenced the yard's mid-19th century development. The complex was modernized for the American Civil War but declined in the late 19th century as maintenance was deferred. Extensive upgrades again took place in the 1890s and 1930s. The complex became known as Boston Naval Shipyard in its final quarter-century, repairing vessels rather than building new ones. After decommissioning, the NPS and the BPDA's predecessor Boston Redevelopment Authority (BRA) acquired the yard. Renovation of existing buildings, and some new construction, took place in phases from the late 20th century onward, while many older buildings were redeveloped.

The yard retains more than two dozen buildings from its military era, designed in a variety of styles. These buildings, which include the Charlestown Ropewalk, Commandant's House, and Marine Barracks, have mainly been redeveloped for office, commercial, and residential use. Open spaces include a Marine parade ground and Shipyard Park. The yard also includes several gates, a street grid, eleven piers, three dry docks, and remnants of a former railroad system. Two ships are docked at the yard: Constitution (1797) and Cassin Young (1943). In the 20th century, the yard had several annexes, including South Boston Naval Annex.

== Military history ==
=== Creation ===
Before the Boston Navy Yard complex was developed, the plot was in the then-separate town of Charlestown, settled in 1629. It was mostly marsh or pasture, with some buildings at the current yard's southwest corner. The site may have been used as a landing site during the American Revolutionary War by both American patriot Paul Revere, during his April 1775 midnight ride, and British forces, during the Battle of Bunker Hill two months later. The Navy was founded with the Naval Act of 1794, under which six frigates were to be built, each at a different new shipyard. Joshua Humphreys, the frigates' contractor, visited New England in 1799–1800 to investigate sites for a shipyard. Humphreys recommended a site in the Boston area, citing the favorable topography and the large potential pool of laborers, despite the drawbacks of fogs. Humphreys suggested a marshy site in Charlestown, near a mansion owned by Aaron Putnam, where he said 23 acres (9.3 ha) could be obtained for $19,350. (Note: Equivalent to $478,000 in 2025)

The frigates were ultimately not built, but plans for the yards were retained. President John Adams agreed on 9 May 1800 to build a shipyard at Charlestown. Charlestown was among the United States Navy's original six shipyards, along with Brooklyn, Norfolk, Philadelphia, Portsmouth, and Washington Navy Yards. Putnam was tasked with studying the feasibility of acquiring land in the area. Under an act passed by the Massachusetts General Court (the state legislature), land acquisition for the initial phase of construction began on 26 August 1800. The initial acquisition was completed on 3 April 1801, comprising ten land lots. This gave the Navy a site of 34.25 acres (13.86 ha), at a cost of $37,348. (Note: Equivalent to $897,000 in 2025) The Charlestown Navy Yard never had a formal opening ceremony, being built up gradually. For much of its time as a military facility, at least part of it was open to the public. Employment generally peaked during wars (except for the Vietnam War) and decreased during peacetime.

=== 19th century ===
==== 1800s to 1820s ====
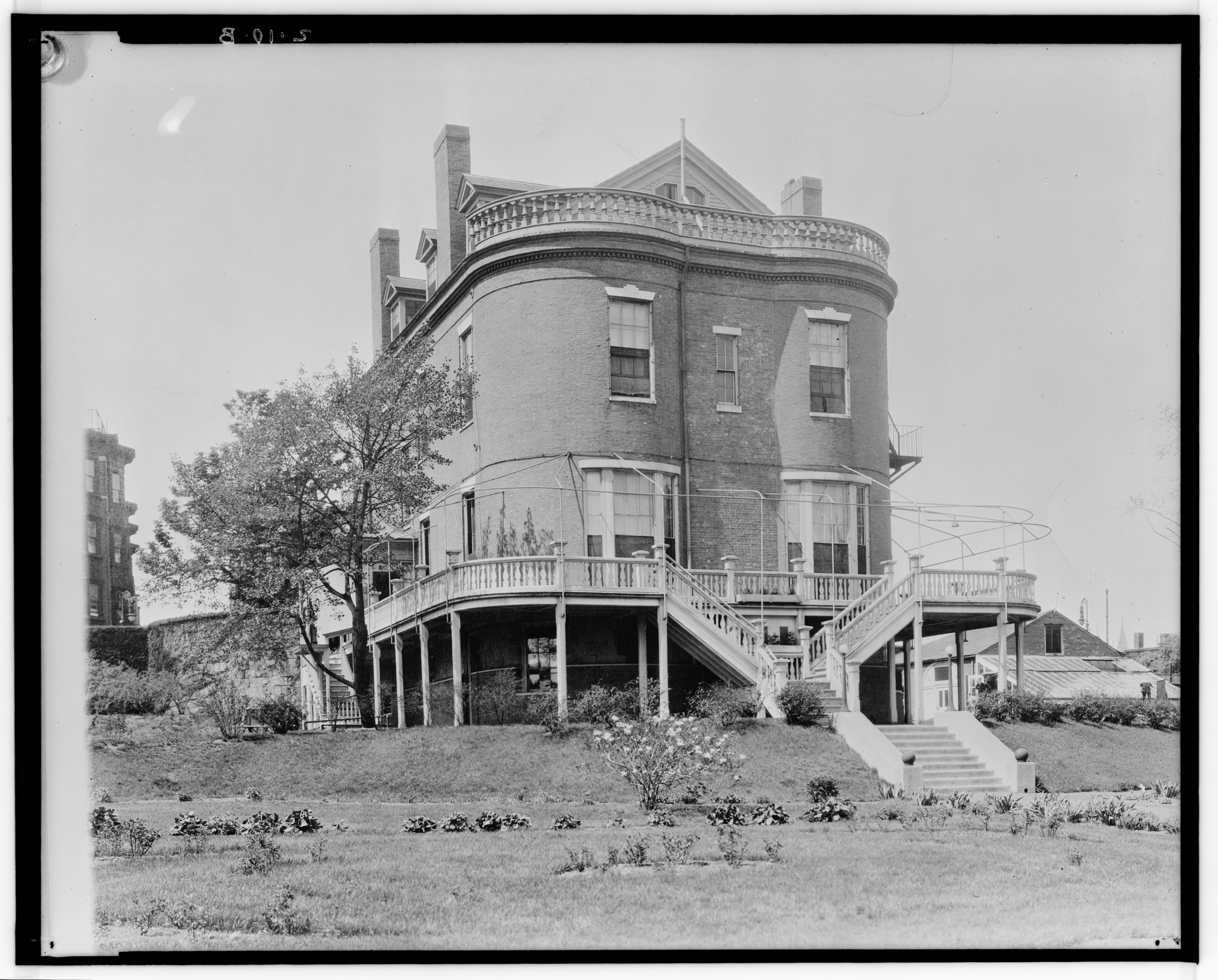
The Commandant's House, among the earliest structures built at Charlestown Navy Yard

Samuel Nicholson, the yard's first commandant, oversaw limited improvements to the complex, which began in 1802. The first wharf was among the earliest structures built; the initial plans also included a dry dock, which was not constructed for over two decades. The site was little used before the War of 1812, and other U.S. government agencies used parts of it. The Treasury Department leased 5 acres (2.0 ha) at the yard's northeastern corner in 1802 for a marine hospital, and the War Department occupied a laboratory. That year, a Marine Corps detachment began guarding the yard and constructed their first barracks there. Quarters G, the commandant's house, was constructed in 1805 as the yard's first residence. Modifications to Quarters G, conducted two years later, marked the earliest repairs to the yard. In 1809, the U.S. Army completed a gunhouse and a firearms magazine that it shared with the Navy, and shortly thereafter, a boundary fence was built between the Army and Navy facilities. The original Marine barracks was replaced with a brick structure in 1810–1811, and a parade ground was built simultaneously.

By 1812, a report by Commandant William Bainbridge found the complex in poor condition. The yard contained Quarters G and I; a blacksmith's shop; various other offices, residences, and storage structures; and a boat landing and wharf. A slipway for manufacturing ships was planned, but construction was deferred for a lack of funds. The Navy added a wharf and slipway at the western boundary in 1813, after Congress finally provided an appropriation for Charlestown Navy Yard. The first quay wall was built that year, and a ropewalk was also proposed, albeit not built. The slipway was enclosed by a shiphouse in late 1813 but was blown apart and replaced within a year. In the mid-1810s, defensive weaponry was installed at the entrances, and a perimeter fence was added. With retrenchment after the war, the Board of Navy Commissioners considered moving all the Navy's storehouses to Charlestown (which never occurred) and erecting a dry dock there. During 1817, the Navy built Quarters A (the porter's and guard's residence) and moved the fence following a land swap. A new spar shed and timber shed were also added in the late 1810s.

A further two shiphouses were built in the early 1820s, by which the Navy Department reported that the yard was "in great decay". The Navy also acquired land on the western boundary, relandscaped that site, and added outbuildings. It obtained further land in the Lower Yard from the Army in 1821. Afterward, the Navy also sought to take over the Marine Hospital, eventually doing so in 1825. The next year, the Navy completed a perimeter wall designed by Alexander Parris. The wall was Parris's first project at the yard, with which he remained involved for nearly two decades. Also in the 1820s, Parris designed a carriage house; the Navy replaced the marine hospital with a yard officers' residence; and a shipbuilding ways and a third shiphouse were built. The Navy hired Loammi Baldwin Jr. to design a new dry dock at Charlestown, work on which began in 1827. Other upgrades in the late 1820s included a new artillery battery and re-landscaping of the area near Salem Turnpike.

Meanwhile, the U.S. executive branch had begun thorough studies of the country's navy yards in 1826; Baldwin was appointed as chief engineer for the Charlestown Navy Yard study. His master plan was approved in 1828. It recommended removing several buildings and adding a dry dock, shipbuilding way, and street grid, along with several ultimately-unbuilt canals. Most of the existing buildings to date were grouped in two areas, while marshland and a creek took up the remaining site. The master plan influenced development at Charlestown Navy Yard during the next four decades. Parris and his successor as chief engineer, Joseph E. Billings, designed many of the buildings constructed at Charlestown during that era. The administration of President Andrew Jackson studied the country's seven navy yards in 1829, finding that the Charlestown yard could not be eliminated "without injury to the naval service".

==== 1830s to 1850s ====
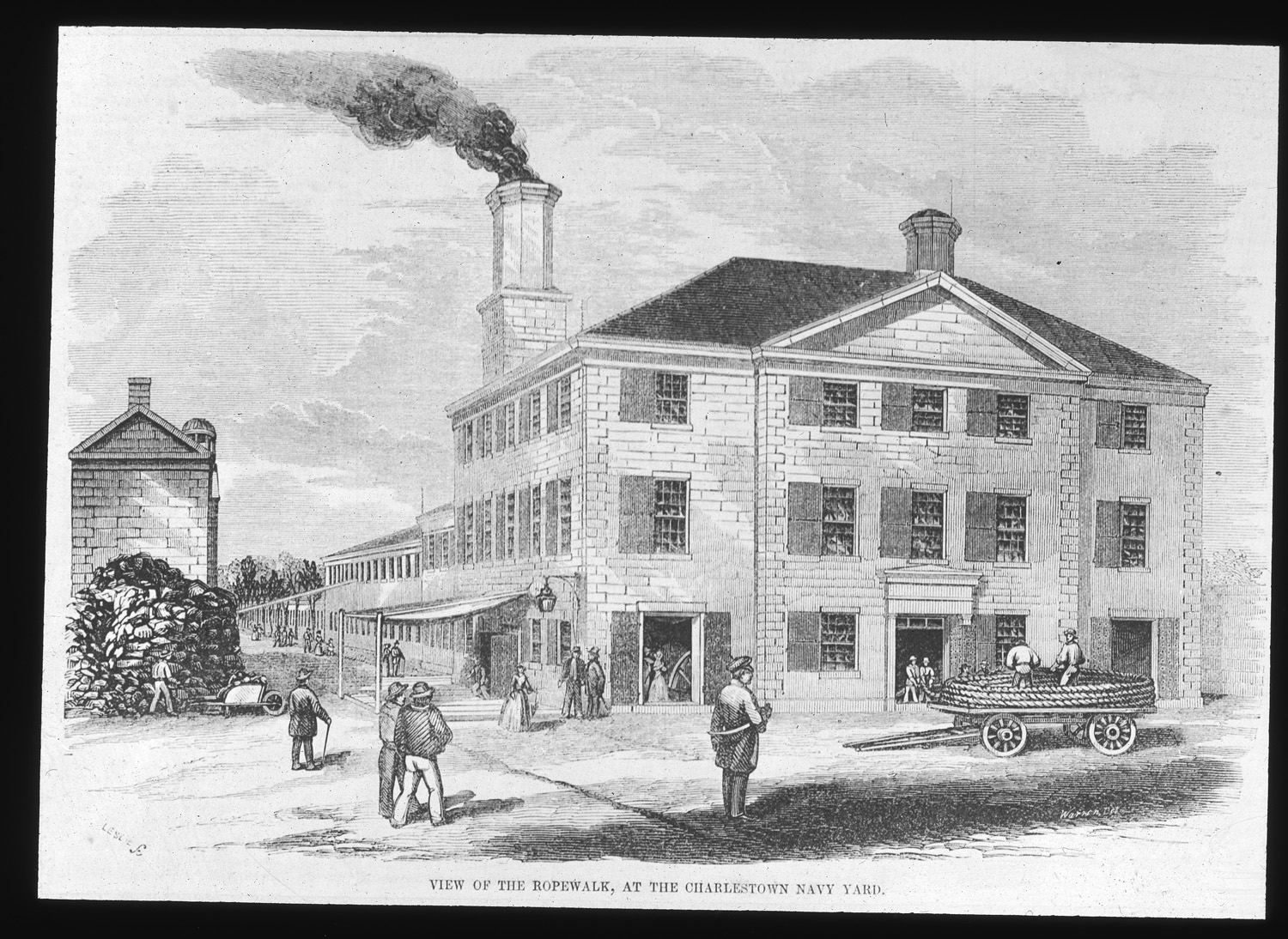
The Charlestown Ropewalk (depicted here in 1852) was built in 1837.

The Upper Quarters, housing non-commissioned officers, was completed in 1833. Due to granite shortages and inclement weather, work on the dry dock (later Dry Dock 1) was delayed; it was finally inaugurated on 24 June 1833. With Dry Dock 1's completion, steam-powered equipment was introduced to the yard, and a pump house was built. Jackson approved plans for the Charlestown Ropewalk in 1834. The ropewalk, approval of which followed years of negotiations, was placed in Charlestown because of the region's industrial, trade, and workforce advantages. During that decade, Congress also gave the U.S. Marine Corps permission to acquire land for a new barracks near the Navy Yard, which never happened. The ropewalk opened in 1837 and initially supplied rope for the entire Navy. Other buildings, including hemp, tar, and engine houses, were built to support the ropewalk's operations. By later that decade, the new Dry Dock 1 was already too small for ships such as Fulton.

Additional land was filled in the 1840s, and several roads were paved during that time. The perimeter wall was also expanded to surround the entire yard, and another entrance was built. By then, Charlestown Navy Yard was a major facility for the Navy, maintaining the Navy's wooden-hulled ships. Only one wharf could accommodate long ships, so the Navy added two more wharves during that decade, each with various ancillary buildings. As power demands increased, coal sheds were erected as well. During the Mexican–American War (1846–1848), activity increased, with 700 workers by 1846. Ten ships involved in the war were serviced at Charlestown, and additional storage and workshop buildings were constructed to support the war effort. When shipbuilding slowed down after the war, the Navy allowed private ships to use Dry Dock 1. The Navy built the Carpenters and Joiners Shop in 1849, and successive commandants remodeled the grounds around their house.

By the early 1850s, Gleason's Pictorial described Charlestown Navy Yard as having three shiphouses, two storehouses, a parade grounds, and a landscape with tree-lined avenues. Charlestown Navy Yard remained a busy facility and employed up to 900 people throughout the year. After Parris's 1852 death, Billings oversaw subsequent construction. During the mid-1850s, the Navy constructed an octagonal muster house, a new Gate 4, and a pitch house. Dry Dock 1 was also expanded and its pump replaced. A machine shop complex was also added starting in 1855, allowing the yard to install and repair ship engines. The yard was retrofitted with natural gas illumination the next year. The Navy also renovated numerous buildings, lengthened the fences, paved more roads, and landscaped the yard. In addition, it dredged the rivers outside the yard in 1857. Ultimately, the yard underwent $250,000 (Note: Equivalent to $7,166,000 in 2025) in upgrades during that decade, funded by Congress.

==== 1860s and 1870s ====
Activity increased again during the American Civil War (1861–1865). The yard built 17, launched 23, and converted 40 vessels for wartime use, in addition to repairing over a hundred more vessels. Various temporary buildings were constructed at the yard. In 1862, the Navy laid water pipes and installed hydrants, replacing older wells. Shortly thereafter, workers constructed the yard's railroad system. Other new facilities during the war included a heavy hammer house, a joiners shop–paint loft, ordnance store, and upgrades to the machine shop. The Navy also acquired White's Wharf and two buildings west of the existing complex. Ship construction proceeded slowly, and in 1866 the Navy canceled work on the remaining incomplete vessels. Under Navy Secretary Gideon Welles, after the war, the yard's workforce and activities were scaled back, and stockpiles were sold. The yard was downgraded to an equipment and recruit facility. By 1868, the U.S. House of Representatives was considering closing the yard, citing its limited area and the region's increasing demand for industrial waterfront space. The next year, a U.S. Navy board proposed a new master plan that included constructing three dry docks, various shops, and residential quarters; moving the ropewalk to the Chelsea Naval Hospital; and obtaining the Mystic Flats to the east.

The yard encompassed 75 acres (30 ha) by 1870. Through that decade, Charlestown Navy Yard declined as maintenance lagged, though the yard remained an important repair and ropemaking facility. Nine buildings (four of which were temporary) were built during the decade, while other temporary structures were removed. The Navy also destroyed several incomplete vessels, including Virginia (1825), which had been under construction for a half-century by then. By then, the public could enter the yard except on Sundays. Upgrades in the early 1870s included a new shiphouse, a scale house, and an experimental timber-bending mill. The complex had four wooden wharves, which needed constant upkeep. The tree-lined streets, parade ground, lawn, and waterfront flirtation walk were popular among the public. The yard became part of Boston in 1874, when that city annexed Charlestown. By mid-decade, the yard employed only 226 people, its workforce having been reduced over 80% in three years; the yard was reported in a state of disrepair, and the roads were mostly unpaved. The Navy installed a wood treatment plant in 1877, the functionality of which The New York Times called questionable at best.

==== 1880s and 1890s ====
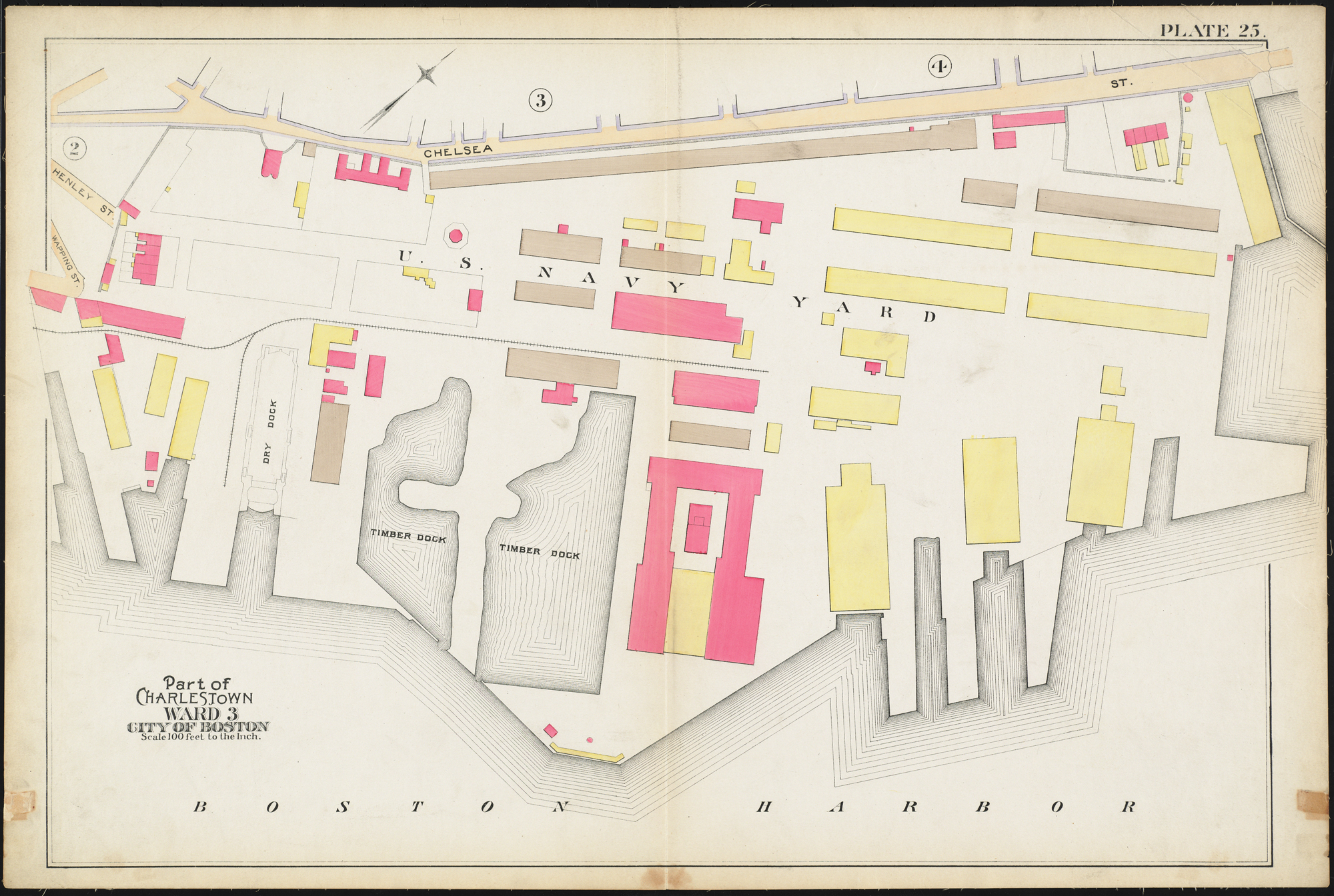
Map of Charlestown Navy Yard in 1892

Four workshops and three storage sheds were built during the 1880s. The complex retained facilities for wooden ships—including a wet-timber dock and sail loft—and oxen still transported timber through the yard. Some facilities, such as an iron-plate mill and a coaling wharf, had been built for steel-hulled ships. Several damaged or incomplete ships inhabited the yard's "Rotten Row", and an 1880 fire damaged several buildings near the ropewalk. An attempt to close the yard in 1882 elicited outcry. Local residents disputed the U.S. government's ownership of the land, though the Navy said all previous landowners had given up their ownership claims. That year, Congress passed legislation allowing the Navy Secretary's office to suspend operations at yards where continued operation was infeasible; this allowed the Navy to drastically reduce funding for Charlestown Navy Yard and relocate its equipment to other navy yards. Secretary William E. Chandler suspended all activities at Charlestown, except rope and sail manufacturing, in June 1883. Afterward, the ropewalk was the main facility keeping the yard open. Further money-saving measures reduced the workforce to 40 by 1884. In 1887, Charlestown became a "general manufacturing yard" for equipment, specializing particularly in anchors, sails, rope, and chains. By then, employment had increased again to 260.

Some wharves were repaired during the late 1880s, and repairs of both civilian craft and older naval vessels took place. Nonetheless, in 1889, Secretary Benjamin F. Tracy reported that the yard was in poor condition, with unpaved roads, rotting buildings, a barely-functioning dry dock, and one usable wharf. Two-fifths of the complex's 88 buildings were wooden structures (many dating from the Civil War), and entire sections of the complex were unusable. One writer from the Boston Daily Globe wrote that, even as Congress was considering new navy yards, Boston Navy Yard had received fewer commissions than other shipyards. Significant upgrades finally took place from the 1890s onward, though one historian retrospectively called these improvements slapdash and sometimes fleeting. At the time, the yard was organized into eight departments and also included a receiving ship, prison, and Marine detachment. Congress allocated $152,000 in 1890, (Note: Equivalent to $4,963,000 in 2025) which was used to upgrade several buildings. Initially, appropriations were allocated only for minor repairs, allowing the Navy to pave more roads, replace water pipes, and add a sewage system and electric lighting. Congressional appropriations also allowed the Navy to restore equipment.

Congressional legislation for a new dry dock was introduced in 1894; by then, Navy Yard officials perceived the existing Dry Dock 1 as too small. The yard's overcrowded naval prison was upgraded that year, and employment gradually increased. During the Spanish–American War in 1898, the Navy attempted once again to modernize Boston Navy Yard, and public access was temporarily restricted. The workforce tripled from 500 to 1,500. Several old buildings were demolished, and the Navy suggested using Boston Navy Yard as a repair facility for torpedo boats. It also awarded a contract to build Dry Dock 2, construction of which was delayed by accidents and the contractor's bankruptcy. The complex still had difficulties repairing the Navy's newest vessels, and the yard's chief engineer wanted $367,000 for various upgrades. (Note: Equivalent to $11,984,000 in 2025) Further legislation in 1899 provided funding for four dry docks nationwide; the legislation allowed up to one granite dry dock, which Secretary John Davis Long decided should be built at Boston.

=== Early 20th century ===
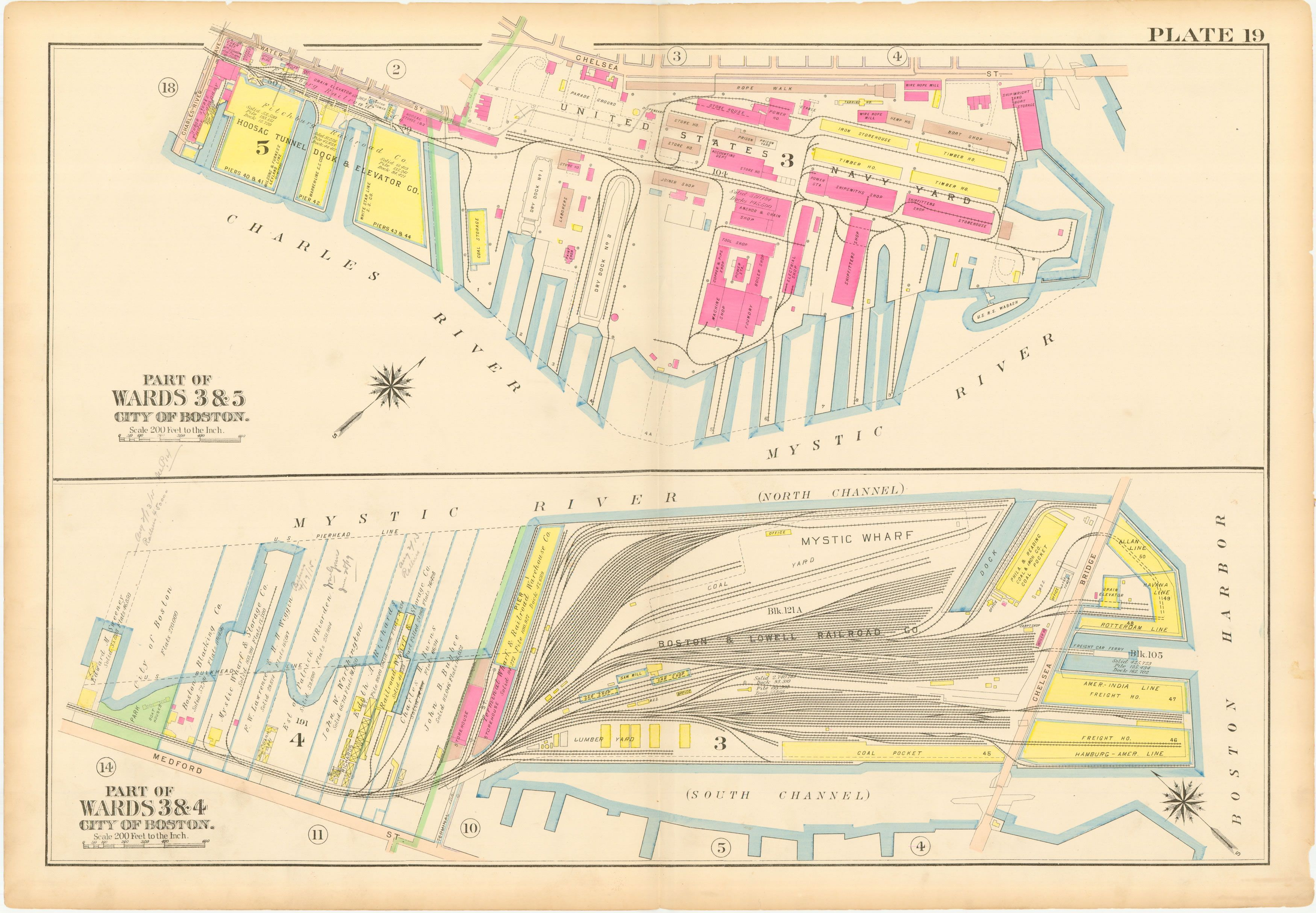
1912 map of Boston Navy Yard (top) and neighboring Mystic Wharf (bottom)

In the early 20th century, the complex was modernized to accommodate larger, diesel-powered vessels and destroyers. In addition to the new dry dock and piers, about 80 buildings were added from 1898 to 1931, including 40 before 1914. After World War I, the Navy acquired several annexes, including Lockwood's Basin and South Boston Naval Annex. Boston Navy Yard's commandant also supervised facilities in nearby towns, including Chelsea Naval Hospital and ammunition and niter storage depots.

==== 1900s and 1910s ====
During the 1900s, shipbuilding activities restarted at Boston Navy Yard, which then employed about 2,000 people. The Navy carried out upgrades, including rebuilding the railroad system, adding movable cranes, constructing a utility tunnel, and adding electric and telephone service. Existing piers were expanded or rebuilt, and piers 3–6 and 4A were constructed. The reconstruction of Pier 1 had required the demolition of several structures, and the Navy built a coaling plant and a radio tower there. The Navy also renumbered the piers and the street grid. Many older buildings in the Lower Yard, including the shiphouses, were razed for new development, while outdoor ordnance-storage "parks" in the Upper Yard were replaced with tennis courts. Equipment was also upgraded.

The spar shop burned down in 1900, one of several fires at the yard in the early 20th century; the carpenter's shop subsequently burned in 1910. New buildings in the 1900s were largely made of fireproof materials such as brick, granite, and limestone. These structures, which comprised three-quarters of new construction before 1914, are attributed to the Bureau of Yards and Docks. Development in the early and mid-1900s included a power plant and assorted structures such as workshops, a pitch house, and a toilet. Dry Dock 2 opened in 1905, and an associated pump house, docks, and crane tracks were completed at that time. Buildings such as the equipment and machine shops were modified, and the Navy relocated other buildings and repaired Dry Dock 1. The Navy added an administration building and a gate to the Upper Yard. In the late 1900s, it also expanded the hemp house, ropewalk, marine barracks, and shell house. Additions in the early 1910s included a wireless station tower and an officer's quarters.

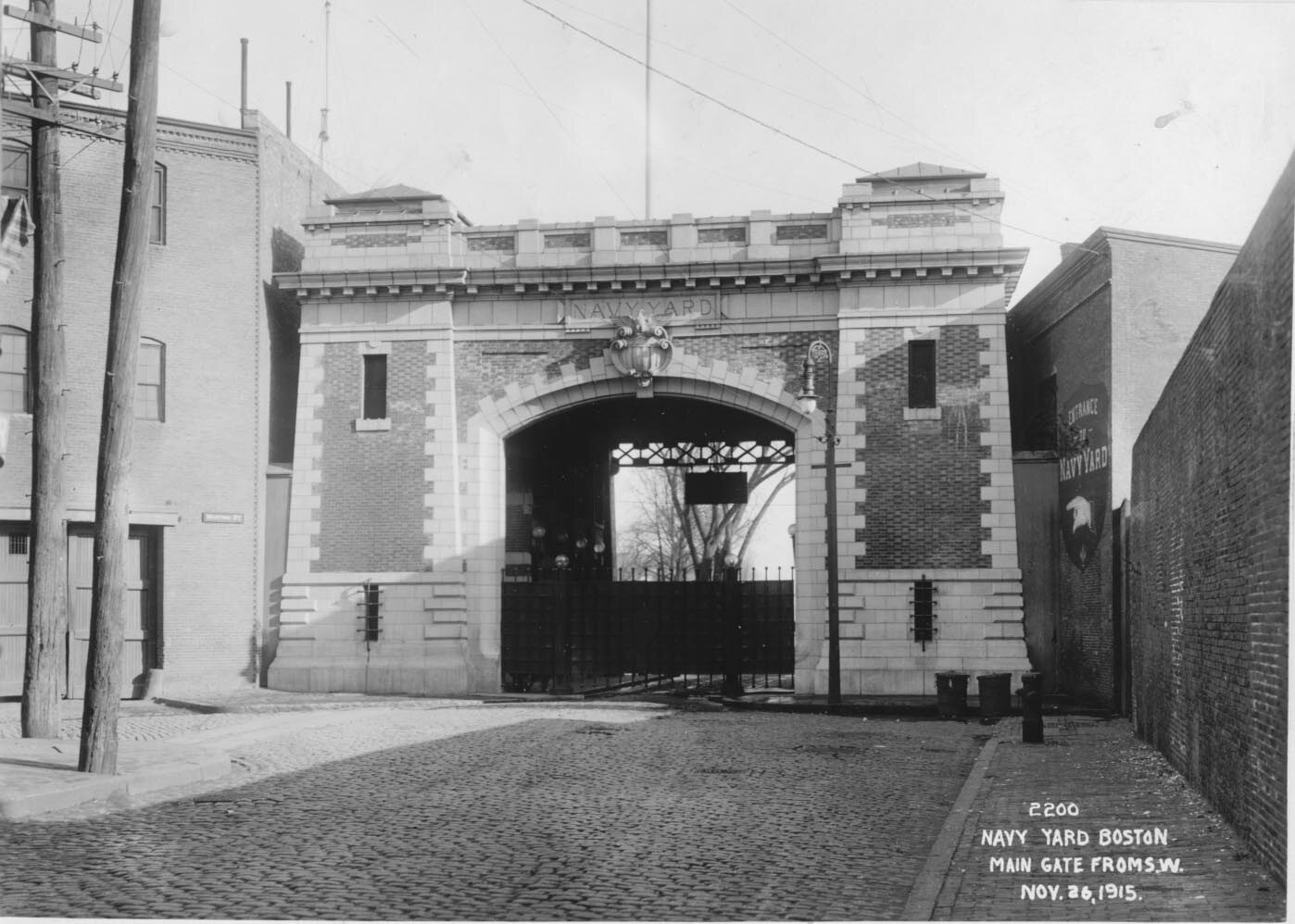
The main gate (since demolished), seen in 1915

The yard had ten piers with nine cranes by 1914, and the complex was still a popular visitor attraction and a major manufacturing facility. However, the yard was working at only one-fourth capacity, and the Navy had considered closing it. The onset of World War I quintupled employment between 1915 and 1919, during which the workforce grew from 2,500 to 12,844. Boston Navy Yard became a significant site for the conversion of civilian vessels to military use. It was also a supply depot and port of embarkation, used by 50 vessels daily on average. The Navy developed 36 structures (including seven temporary structures) during that time. Most of the new structures were storage buildings, alleviating what a naval commission had called an "alarming" lack of storage. A marine railway, used for hull inspections, was constructed in 1918–1919. Other structures completed in the late 1910s included a bandstand, a scale house, and the first general storehouse at Building 149. After the war, the Navy planned to continue operations at Boston Navy Yard.

==== 1920s and 1930s ====
Relatively little work took place immediately following World War I, and the yard received few new structures. A detailed 1921 study of the yard's facilities found dozens of industrial structures, two dry docks, eleven piers, and eleven cranes. The yard's staff, which numbered 5,865 that year, was reduced to less than 3,000 by 1922. Manufacturing of cast steel chains was moved to Norfolk in 1921, and after the yard completed Whitney two years later, shipbuilding also subsided. Modifications during the 1920s consisted mostly of repairs and machinery installations, along with some recreational facilities. Due to funding shortfalls, the Navy conducted only essential repairs on facilities such as the piers, foundry, and power plant. Some temporary structures were moved to the South Boston Naval Annex, while others were demolished or relocated within Charlestown Navy Yard. The power plant was upgraded, the perimeter wall was partly replaced, and some wooden piers were rebuilt. New buildings during the late 1920s included a pump house and a garage. After Boston Navy Yard's civilian employees devised a hardier die-lock chain (which became Navy standard), the yard began manufacturing chains again. Employment had dwindled to 1,580 by 1929.

Shipbuilding resumed in 1931, when Boston Navy Yard was contracted to construct two destroyers, though the Navy was also considering closing the yard by then. The closure did not occur at the time, but the threat remained for years. Several facilities underwent modifications early in the decade, including the piers, marine railway, forge shop, and headhouse. The Navy constructed the destroyers in the dry docks; most destroyers were built in Dry Dock 2 and completed in Dry Dock 1, while ship repairs were conducted ashore. The National Industrial Recovery Act of 1933 enabled the Navy to finance ship construction and upgrade some facilities. From the mid-1930s onward, Works Progress Administration (WPA) forces extensively overhauled the complex. On the waterfront, they rebuilt several buildings; repaired the dry docks, marine railway, and Pier 1; and constructed a gas station and pipe shop. In the Upper Yard, WPA laborers modified the commandant's and officers' quarters, and they erected garages and upgraded tennis courts. The complex's railroad was rebuilt again. The roads were also repaved, and new diesel locomotives and cranes replaced outdated equipment. Shipyard workers established a newsletter in 1936, (Note: Originally the Boston Navy Yard News; after 1945, the Boston Naval Shipyard News) which ran until 1974.

=== Mid-20th century ===
==== Early and mid-1940s: World War II ====
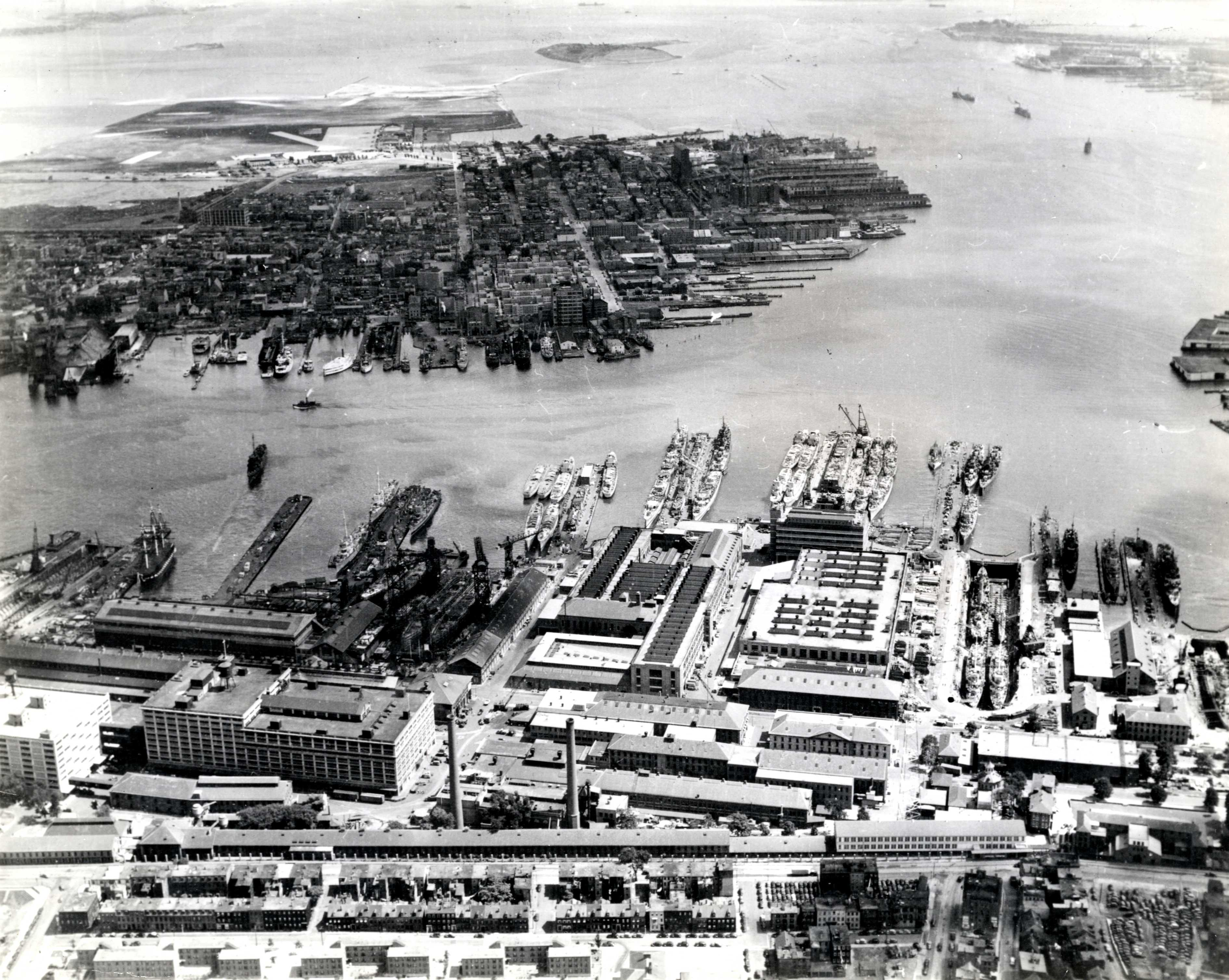
Boston Navy Yard in 1942

At the outbreak of World War II (1939–1945), Boston Navy Yard had 3,900 employees. While the yard was generally in good condition, some facilities (including the railroad) needed work, and the shipbuilding facilities were seriously inadequate. In September 1939, President Franklin D. Roosevelt declared a national emergency, and the yard was closed to the public. Employment reached 18,200 by 1941 as wartime activities escalated. At the peak of World War II, the complex employed about 50,000 people, (Note: One source retrospectively cites a record-high figure of 48,000 staff, while some sources record a more precise figure of 50,128 staff. This maximum employment was reached on 30 June 1943.) who worked in three eight-hour shifts by 1942. The yard had thousands of women and non-white staff for the first time. During the war, Boston Navy Yard built about 300, converted 74, outfitted about 1,100, and repaired over 3,000 vessels. In addition, it commissioned 120 ships built elsewhere, mostly at other New England shipyards. The Navy spent $15 million upgrading Boston Navy Yard (Note: Equivalent to $212 million in 2025) and $35 million on the annexes throughout the war. (Note: Equivalent to $496 million in 2025)

To increase shipbuilding capacity, the Navy announced plans for two new shipways in 1940; when they were completed the next year, the Navy moved shipbuilding activities there. The piers were reconfigured and rebuilt. The marine railway was rebuilt, outdated buildings were demolished, new cranes were installed, and a garage in the adjacent neighborhood was acquired. In the upper yard, the Navy erected Building 198 as temporary storage. The influx in staff required new personnel facilities, including a personnel building and new toilets and lockers. The Lower Yard received 12 new structures, including a second storehouse, electrical shop, public works building, and garage. Other buildings were modified or demolished, the flirtation walk was razed, and the Upper Yard's bandstand was replaced.

With insufficient room at Charlestown to accommodate all the Navy's activities, several annexes were acquired or upgraded, and many repair activities were moved to the South Boston Annex. This allowed the Charlestown complex to focus on ship conversion and construction. Under the Lend-Lease Act, it built vessels used by the allied British Royal Navy. One of the shipways became Dry Dock 5 in 1944; by then, employment and defense-related activities were both decreasing.

==== Late 1940s and 1950s ====
After World War II, Charlestown (Boston) Navy Yard was officially renamed Boston Naval Shipyard, and drastic drawdowns brought employment to about 16,000 by 1946. The grounds were partly reopened to the public, and due to overcrowding and intensive use, many structures needed repair. The yard finished several craft already underway, and its staff oversaw the decommissioning of nearby military facilities. The complex also handled vessel repairs and deactivations, though no new vessels started construction. In the decade after World War II, Boston Naval Shipyard converted over 1,000 ships and became particularly known for overhauling destroyers. In 1947, the Navy formally designated Boston Navy Yard as a facility for vessel "construction, docking, overhaul, and alteration"; the yard was initially tasked with handling smaller ships, but its official purpose was later expanded to include larger craft such as aircraft carriers. Boston Naval Shipyard's purpose remained little changed until its deactivation, and the threat of closure persisted during the mid-20th century.

The Navy devised a master plan for the yard in 1948. The plan—which involved extensively overhauling, demolishing, or constructing dozens of buildings—went largely unrealized. Due to funding shortages, the Navy repaired existing facilities instead, and few changes were ultimately made. In the late 1940s, the Navy added tennis courts, rebuilt two dry docks, extended Dock 1, and added a saluting battery and explosives bunker. The yard continued manufacturing ship equipment, and during the Korean War (1950–1953), the yard outfitted many vessels with radar and sonar equipment. The Navy converted one building into a sonar facility, a function later moved to South Boston. Four piers were also replaced. Other new facilities included a chapel, grit hopper, and fuel tank, alongside new machinery for the Forge and Chain Shop. The Navy considered overhauling submarines at Boston Naval Shipyard, but Charleston Naval Shipyard in South Carolina ultimately assumed these functions instead.

In the mid-1950s, the federal government proposed closing the Ropewalk and Chain Forge; the plan attracted opposition and was eventually withdrawn. The Navy also expanded the dispensary; rebuilt the foundry and the Electronics & Electrical Building; and demolished two buildings and the main gate. Shipway 1 was rebuilt that decade, and a parking area was built. The 1948 master plan continued to be updated, albeit with less extensive changes than before. The yard also began focusing on rehabilitating and overhauling existing vessels. From 1959 onward, it conducted Fleet Rehabilitation and Modernization (FRAM) overhauls. During the late 1950s and early 1960s, a concrete speaker's platform and new landscaping, including a baseball field, were added to the Upper Yard. Large swathes of open space were paved over as demand for parking increased. Most available open space was used for parking, so very little greenery remained by the late 1950s.

==== 1960s and 1970s: Final years, closure ====
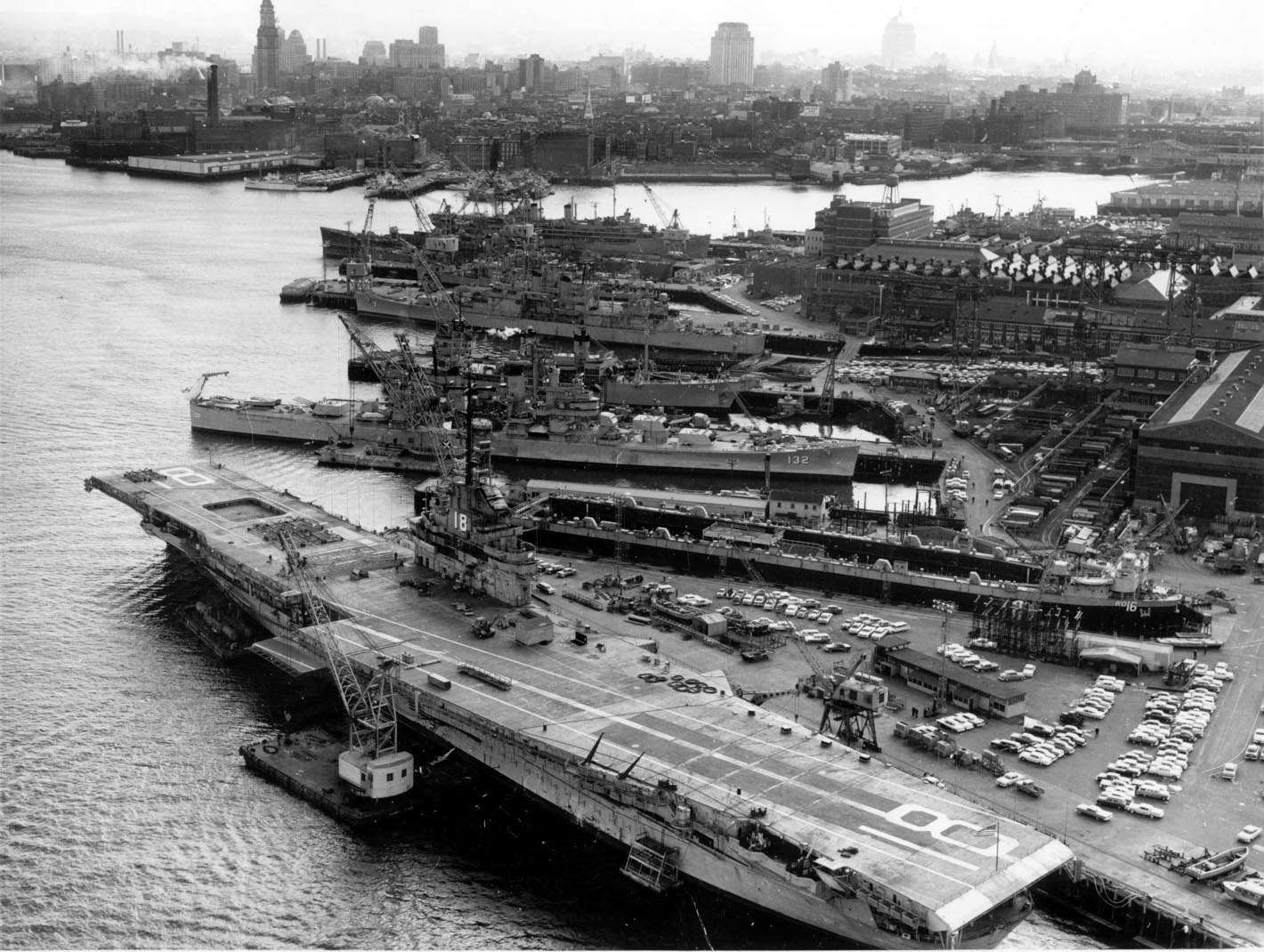
Aerial view of Boston Navy Yard in April 1960

Further development of Boston Naval Shipyard subsided in the 1960s. Dry Dock 2 was overhauled in 1961, and only five new buildings were completed from 1963 to 1973. Among the new structures were another grit hopper. The shipyard's closure was again contemplated in the early 1960s, under defense secretary Robert S. McNamara, but President John F. Kennedy intervened to prevent it. McNamara set aside plans to close the yard in 1963, shuttering two other yards instead. The shipyard continued to repair, retrofit, and overhaul vessels, despite no longer building warships. Congress members also proposed making the yard a nuclear research center. The Machine Shop was expanded in the late 1960s; this was the shipyard's final significant construction project before its closure.

A master plan, which proposed consolidating operations at South Boston, was proposed in 1968. The proposal called for selling the Charlestown complex to the Massachusetts Port Authority (Massport), but ultimately, this proposal was not funded. By 1970, the yard employed 7,400 people. Boston Naval Shipyard had become costly to operate and mainly existed to support a fleet based at Newport, Rhode Island. It also was incapable of maintaining the Navy's nuclear-powered fleet or accommodating larger vessels such as the Forrestal. The administration of President Richard Nixon wanted to close Boston Navy Yard entirely, but it deferred a decision on the yard's closure in early 1971. The marine railway, deemed no longer operable, was deactivated that year. The Ropewalk, the last remaining such facility in the U.S. Navy, closed that December. Even so, as late as 1972, the Navy had prepared plans to modernize the yard.

The Nixon administration announced plans in April 1973 to close the Boston yard entirely. Amid allegations that the closure was politically motivated, the administration cited the need to reduce excess military capacity after the U.S. withdrawal from the Vietnam War. By then, Boston Naval Shipyard employed 5,228 civilians and about 150 military personnel. Though U.S. senators Edward Brooke and Ted Kennedy fought to keep the yard open, worker layoffs began in August 1973, and the Marines departed in May 1974. The yard was formally deactivated on 1 July 1974, after which only a few security staff remained on site. The disused complex had ten piers and a myriad of buildings. That October, U.S. House Speaker Tip O'Neill unsuccessfully requested that the yard be reopened. Local residents were ambivalent about the closure, as such a move had been contemplated repeatedly, and the Charlestown neighborhood was gentrifying.

== Redevelopment ==
=== 1970s: Early efforts ===
When the complex closed, there were efforts to save USS Constitution, which by act of Congress was required to remain in Boston; she had been maintained and largely docked at Boston Naval Shipyard since 1954. The Navy initially suggested creating a national park comprising Constitution and Boston Navy Yard. The Navy devised an interim plan, temporarily using two buildings for Constitution's crew and the new USS Constitution Museum. The final plan for the area, released in late 1973, involved designating part of the complex near Constitution as the National Naval Park. Other buildings along the park's periphery would have been subject to easements. The National Naval Park site was ultimately included in the Boston National Historical Park in late 1974, and the National Park Service (NPS) provided $11.5 million for the site. The NPS took over its portion of the yard on 1 January 1976. The NPS retrofitted eleven buildings with gas boilers and added fences around its land, and it removed many of the Lower Yard's structures. The Navy formed the USS Constitution Maintenance and Repair Group in July 1976; this group leased much of the NPS's land for continued maintenance of Constitution, while other buildings were leased to various governmental and private tenants.

Meanwhile, government officials wanted to quickly find another use for the rest of the complex. The Boston Redevelopment Authority (BRA), the municipal agency in charge of redevelopment, expressed interest in saving architecturally, historically, and technologically significant structures. Proposals included having private firms use the yard's equipment, or convert the complex into an industrial complex, a campus for the Kennedy Presidential Library, or a construction yard for oil tankers. The Massachusetts government attempted to acquire the rest of the yard, and developer Società Generale Immobiliare (SGI) expressed interest in developing housing there. The Boston Shipbuilding Company also bid for the site, but the city refused to financially support the bid, which failed. The BRA published various master plans for the site. By 1976, the BRA planned 1,000 housing units and a variety of office, hotel, commercial, and institutional space; these goals changed repeatedly over the following years. The Navy also flooded Dry Dock 2 and gave it to the BRA that year.

The BRA appointed SGI to redevelop part of the remaining site in February 1977. SGI subsidiary Immobiliare New England planned to redevelop the complex with a marina and a 16-acre (6.5 ha) park, along with 1,300 condominium apartments. The federal government gave $12.5 million for the redevelopment and $2.6 million for a waterfront park. Federal officials donated around 30 acres (12 ha) to the BRA in 1977–1978, along with 16 acres (6.5 ha) for the park, for a nominal fee. By then, parts of the complex were being cleared, and the utilities and streets were rebuilt. The BRA was negotiating to acquire the remaining land, and in February 1979, SGI gave the BRA $1.7 million to buy another 57 acres (23 ha). Work was delayed by disputes over the site's title, which were not resolved until May 1979, when Massport ceded its claim to the site. The same month, the BRA took title to the site, and construction began on the first building.

=== 1980s and 1990s ===
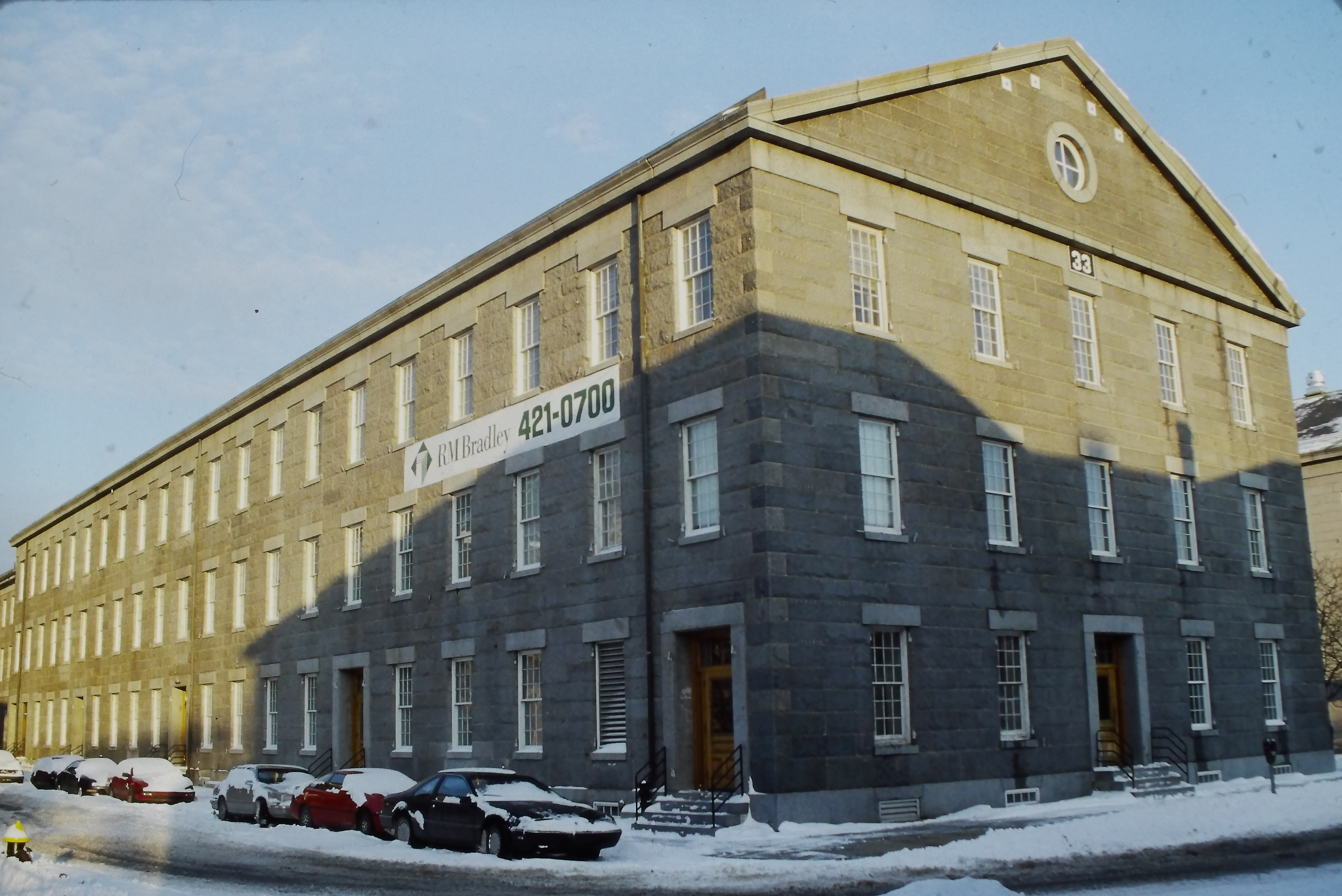
Building 33, one of the buildings to be rehabilitated in the 1980s

The NPS renovated several of its buildings through the 1980s, while on the BRA side, developers signed long-term leases for the historic buildings. Congress transferred three additional buildings to the NPS in 1980, including Building 107. Later that year, the NPS released its General Management Plan for the management of its section. The plan, which stipulated strict preservation regulations for many buildings, drew a variety of criticism. Shipyard Park was completed as well, replacing Building 195. The destroyer Cassin Young was loaned to the NPS and opened as a museum ship in 1981. Work initially progressed slowly, with nine buildings refurbished during the 1980s. The first of these projects, the conversion of Building 42 to a rental apartment building, was finished in 1981. The BRA began constructing a marina at Pier 4 the same year and advertised additional sites for development in the early 1980s. The development's first new buildings, a group of townhouses, began construction in 1983 and were quickly sold out. The Congress Group was selected in 1984 to redevelop buildings 149 and 199 into office space, and work on the first elderly-housing development began that year.

The NPS made other changes to the grounds, including paving streets, relocating the perimeter wall, closing two gates to vehicles, and demolishing two buildings. Gate 4 was also expanded, and the NPS re-landscaped the Upper Yard. The BRA renovated two piers as well. The Navy Yard's first office lease was signed with the Massachusetts Water Resources Authority (MWRA) in 1986. After buildings 149 and 199 were renovated in 1986, Massachusetts General Hospital (MGH) leased Building 149. Concurrently, Basilica Associates began redeveloping Building 106, the first project in the yard's Historic Monument Area. By then, the BRA had approved redevelopment plans for several buildings, and the Congress Group also planned a botanical garden. Developer Neil St. John Raymond had acquired a majority stake in the Congress Group's buildings and Immobiliare New England by 1986. He canceled the botanical garden and announced plans to convert more buildings into residences. By then, 27 projects were underway, and developers had been selected for all existing buildings except the Ropewalk. Although the NPS and BRA did select a developer for the Ropewalk and Chain Forge in the mid-1980s, that project encountered various delays over subsequent decades.

Raymond established companies to provide mortgage loans for residents and to lease Building 149 to research tenants. During the late 1980s, the NPS removed the marine railway, and it published a modified General Management Plan with less stringent preservation stipulations, approved in 1987. The BRA and Raymond created a master plan for the complex's eastern section, known as "Yard's End". The final Yard's End plan—which included a new hotel, parking, and a new location for the New England Aquarium—was enacted in 1990 despite local opposition. The aquarium indefinitely postponed its relocation plans the next year, and most of the Yard's End plan was not subsequently executed.

Work on the Armed Services YMCA, one of the complex's few new buildings, commenced in 1991. Early in the decade, the NPS upgraded Dry Dock 1, and MGH expanded to other buildings in the yard. During that decade, another seven BRA buildings were renovated, and the NPS conducted various roof repairs and repaved roads. The BRA also added a Korean War veterans' memorial to Shipyard Park, completed in 1993. By the mid-1990s, the Boston Navy Yard redevelopment had created 2 million square feet (190,000 m^{2}) of commercial space and 990 residences; most of the new commercial space was used as offices. The new residences, which included both new buildings and conversions of existing structures, were largely condominiums. Developer Martin Oliner announced plans in 1997 for a new apartment building at the complex. The NPS opened a new visitor center that year and repaved the roads on its land in 1999–2000.

=== 2000s to present ===
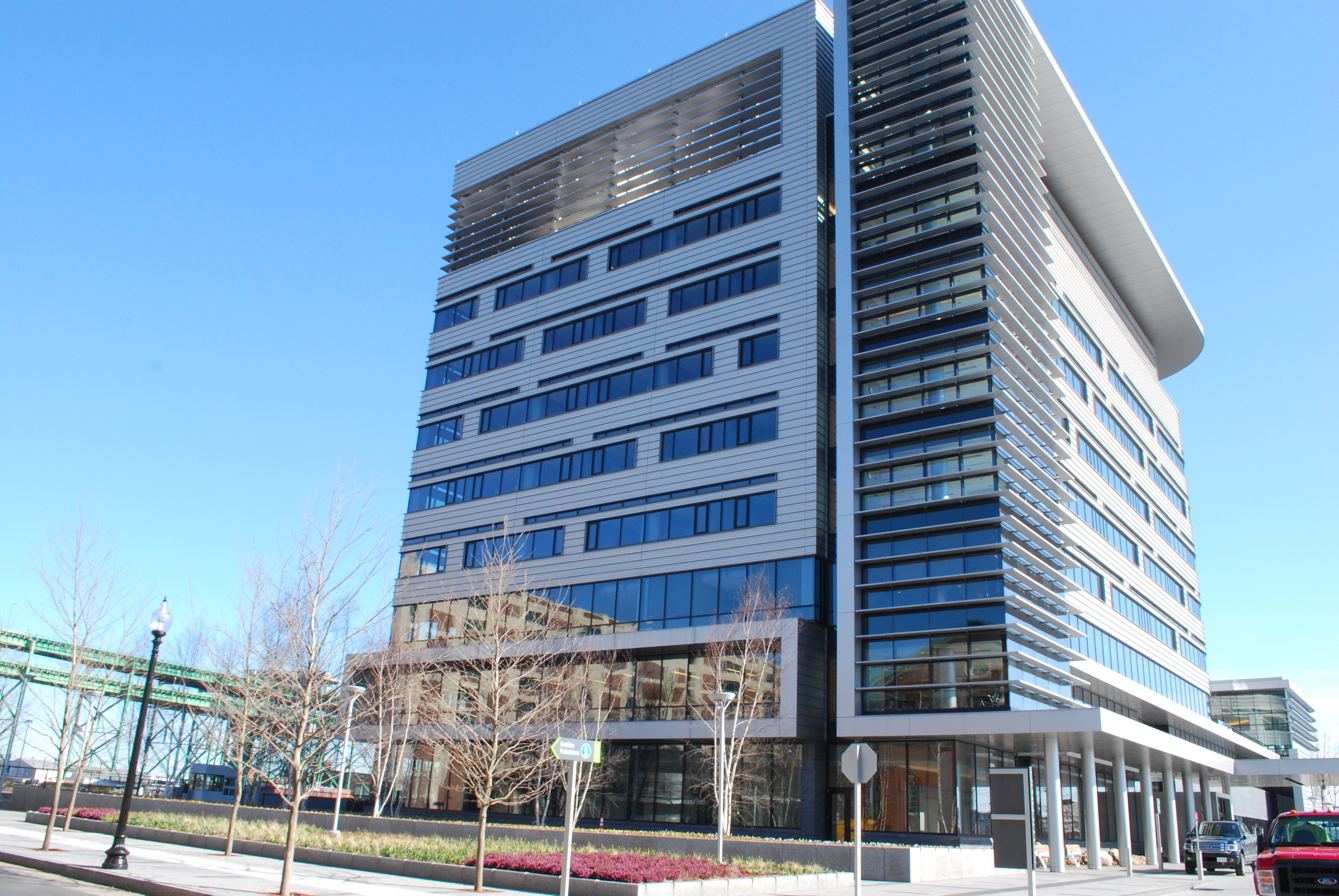
The Spaulding Rehabilitation Hospital, built in the Navy Yard in 2013

During the 2000s, the NPS replaced several other roofs, added anti-vehicular bollards to protect Constitution from terrorist attacks, and refurbished numerous buildings. On the BRA side, Building 114 was renovated into a biomedical lab in 2001, and the Ropewalk was damaged in a 2002 fire. The BRA subsequently tried to redevelop the Ropewalk, but various attempts to do so were unsuccessful. A new NPS visitor center opened at Building 5 in 2008. That year, Building 33 became the first office-to-residential conversion in the Historic Monuments Area, and Oliner's apartment building, Harborview, opened after 11 years of development. By 2009, four buildings were still awaiting redevelopment because of the extreme difficulty of renovating them. By then, the Spaulding Rehabilitation Hospital had been considering a new clinic there for several years.

The Spaulding Rehabilitation Hospital opened in 2013, following cleanup of that site. By then, piers 6 and 8 had become severely deteriorated, and the state government wanted Oliner, its owner, to repair them. Plans for redeveloping the Ropewalk were revived in 2016, and its conversion to an apartment building was completed in 2021. The federal government provided $3 million to renovate several NPS buildings in 2018, and the same year, BRA successor Boston Planning & Development Agency (BPDA) published proposals for further development of the complex. The NPS also began outreach to local residents; at the time, the yard had a million annual visitors, but the Tobin Bridge separated it from the rest of Charlestown. The Anchor beer garden opened there in 2019. Building 108, which was supposed to be renovated, was instead demolished in 2022, with a biomedical lab being planned on its site. The next year, the NPS restored the yard's perimeter wall. By 2025, redevelopment plans for the Chain Forge were pending, and the BPDA approved tentative plans to redevelop Pier 5 that December.

== Site and layout ==
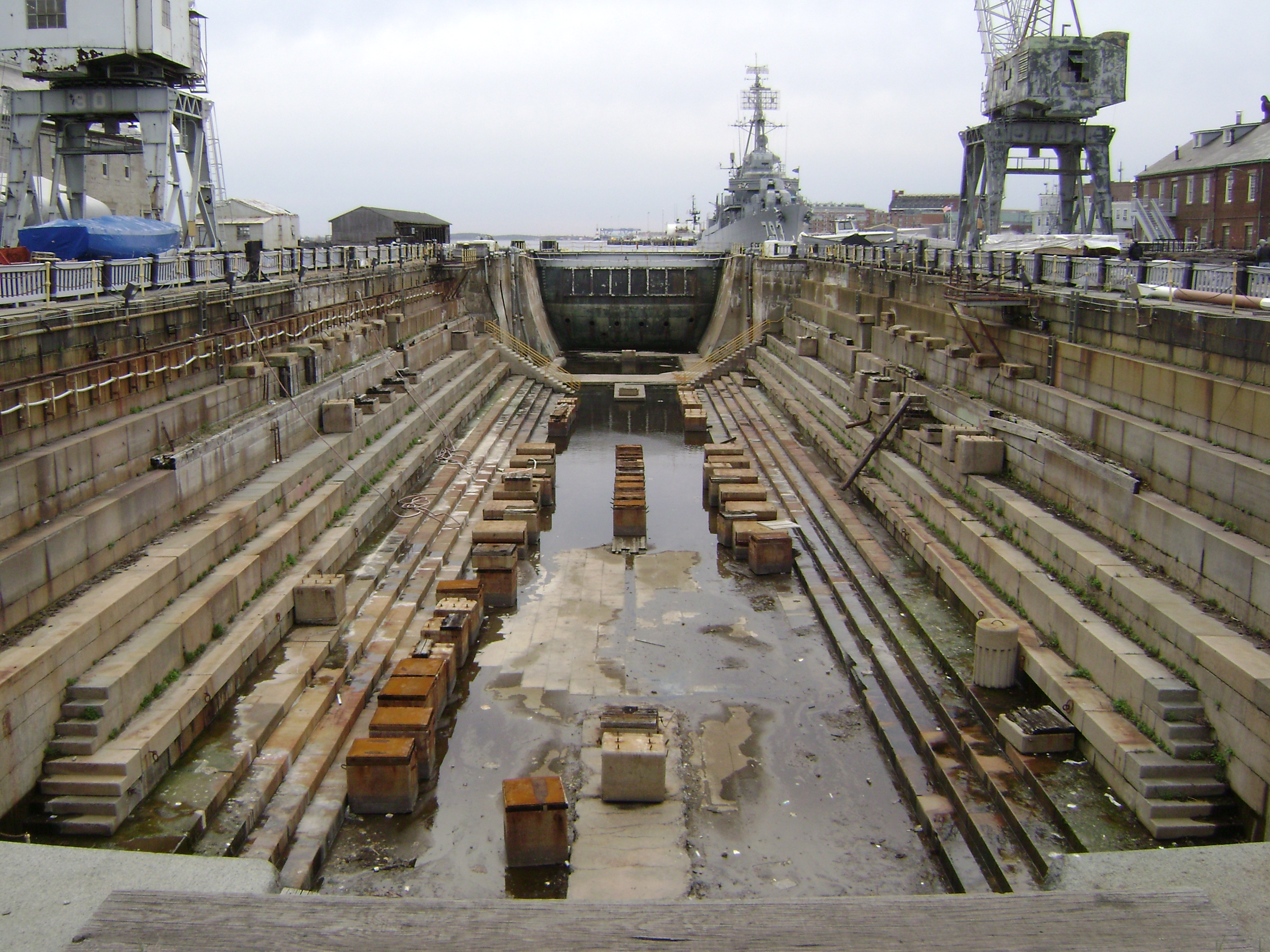
View of dry dock without water

Charlestown (Boston) Navy Yard is located at the northern end of Boston Harbor in Boston, Massachusetts, United States, where the Charles and Mystic rivers converge. This part of Boston Harbor had been selected for its deep riverbed and its location behind other landmasses, making it difficult to conduct surprise attacks. Since Boston Harbor did not freeze over in winter, it could not easily be blockaded either. Before the yard was built, the site was called Moulton's Point, after the nearby Moultons (Mortons) Hill, itself named for an early settler family.

The first portion of the yard, acquired in 1800–1801, originally covered 34.25 acres (13.86 ha). When it closed, Boston Navy Yard had expanded to 129.88 acres (52.56 ha). (Note: A source from 1932 cited Boston Navy Yard as covering 131 acres (53 ha), including the 49-acre (20 ha) South Boston Annex. Other sources give figures of about 130 acres (53 ha) for the Charlestown complex alone. One source gives a more precise breakdown of 83.9 acres (34.0 ha) of land area, plus 1.34 acres (0.54 ha) as part of the marine railway and 46.07 acres (18.64 ha) underwater.) Most of the additional area was filled land, created by filling in basins and expanding seawalls outward. The U.S. Navy also obtained three existing sites in Charlestown over the years: Buildings 3 and 4 (in 1862), Building 204 (in 1942), and a site between gates 1 and 2 (in 1943). Directly northwest of the yard are Chelsea Street and the Tobin (Mystic River) Bridge.

Historically, the yard was divided into the Upper Yard to the northwest, the Lower Yard to the northeast, and the waterfront section to the south. These three subdivisions date from an 1801 site plan submitted to Congress. Since the 1970s, the yard has consisted of four ownership parcels: one controlled by the National Park Service (NPS) and three controlled by the Boston Planning & Development Agency (BPDA; previously the BRA (Note: The BRA was rebranded the BPDA in 2016. See: Clauss, Kyle Scott (27 September 2016). "BRA Changes Name to BPDA, Hopes You'll Trust Them Now". Boston Magazine.)). The NPS manages 25 acres (10 ha) (Note: The 1974 legislation that authorized the historical park's creation had set aside 30 acres (12 ha) of the shipyard for the park.) of the property as part of Boston National Historical Park, which designates its section Charlestown Navy Yard. Of the BPDA-controlled parcels, the section around Charlestown Naval Shipyard Park is about 16 acres (6.5 ha). Another 31 acres (13 ha) is part of the Historic Monument Area, where numerous historic structures (see § Buildings) are preserved. The remaining 58 acres (23 ha) is part of the New Development Area. (Note: Carlson 2010a, pp. 203–205. gives more precise areas for each region: NPS area: 24.72 acres (10.00 ha); Park area: 16.22 acres (6.56 ha); Historic Monument Area: 30.85 acres (12.48 ha); New Development Area: 58.4 acres (23.6 ha); Calisti 1992, pp. 21–22, gives a different area of 31 acres (13 ha) for the Historic Monument Area and 57 acres (23 ha) for the New Development Area.) The boundary between the NPS's and BPDA's sites runs along Baxter Road.

=== Infrastructure ===
There are asphalt roads through the yard, which are given numeric designations; avenues run west–east and streets run north–south. The yard's main artery is First Avenue, which separates the Upper and Lower yards in the north from the waterfront section in the south. Fifth Street divides the Upper Yard to the west and Lower Yard to the east. The Upper and Lower yards are laid out in a grid, drawn up as part of the 1828 master plan. The grid's blocks are occupied mostly by buildings or parking lots, though there are small amounts of green space, including between buildings 58 and 107. The shoreline itself had a boardwalk, the flirtation walk, until World War II. Brick walkways lead from Quarters G, the commandant's house in the Upper Yard.

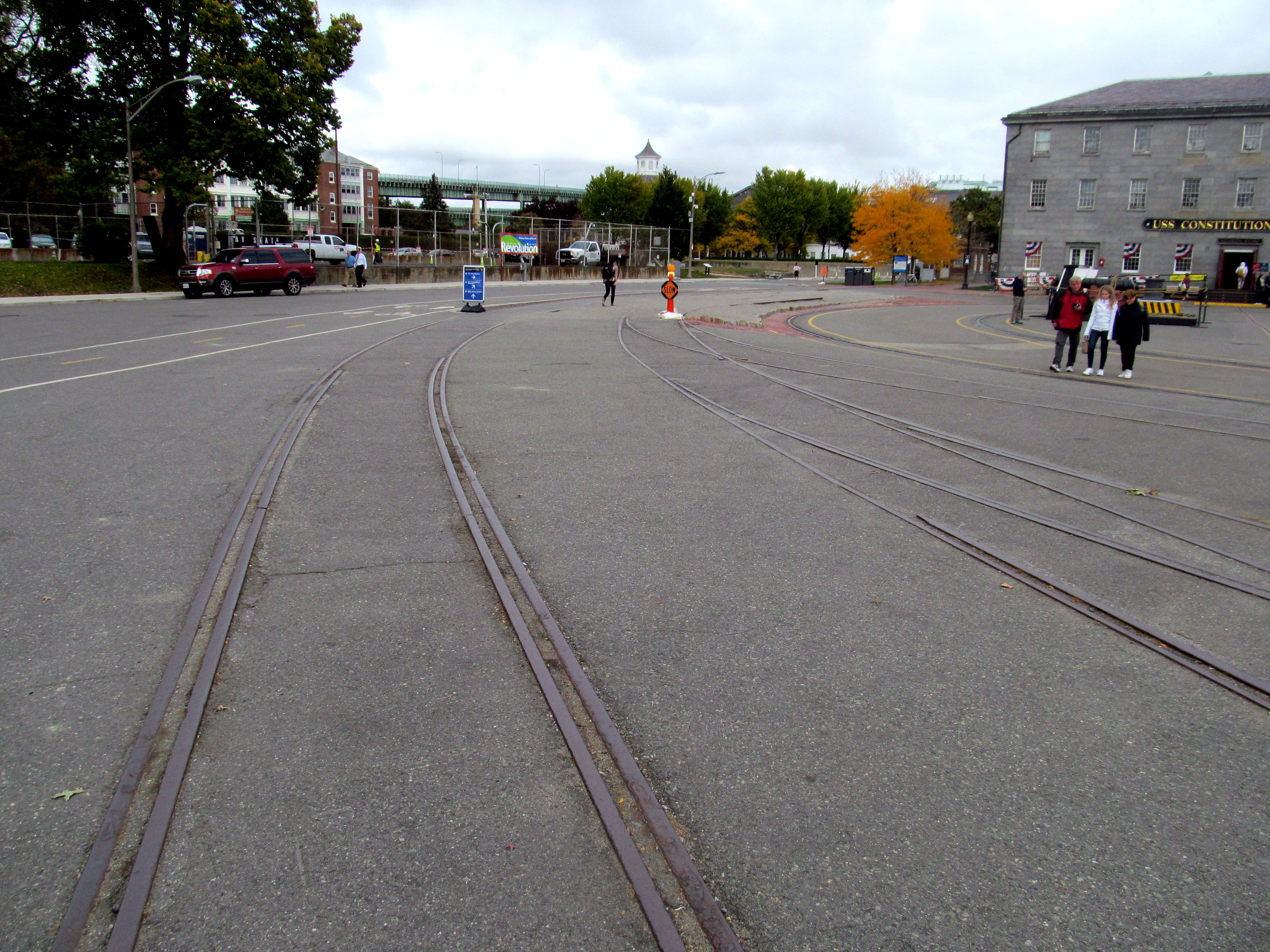
Disused railroad tracks

Boston Navy Yard was originally served by its own set of tracks. Proposed as early as the 1840s, the rail network was not utilized until 1863 or 1865. The tracks were connected to the U.S. railroad system via a spur of the Fitchburg Railroad (later used by the Boston and Maine Railroad). The network, spanning 1,417 yards (1,296 m) by 1869, was comprehensively rebuilt in 1902 and 1937. A report from 1983 found that the yard had 6,300 feet (1,900 m) of standard gauge tracks. Additional tracks ran along First Avenue and on the docks, ending at Fifth Street, where there was a track scale and a concrete pad. The tracks were mostly removed in the 1970s, and the few remaining stretches of track were unusable by the 21st century.

There was about 1,000 feet (300 m) of dual gauge trackage, shared with movable cranes with a gauge of 20 feet (6.1 m). Each crane weighed 40 short tons (36 long tons; 36 t) and ran along the dry docks. The tracks contain two or three non-operable portal cranes.

Boston Navy Yard also contains Marine Railway 11 (originally Dry Dock 3, then Dry Dock 4), constructed in 1918–1919 between piers 2 and 3. The marine railway, which allowed ships to be pulled out for hull inspections, slopes down at a rate of 7/96. Marine Railway 11 was served by an approximately 52-by-350-foot (16 by 107 m) wooden cradle with machinery, which was removed in 1995. It ran on three rails, with a 15-foot (4.6 m) gap between the central rail and each outer rail, but has not been operational since 1971. The infrastructure also included large cisterns, dating from before the complex's water system was built.

=== Wall and gates ===
Alexander Parris's 1820s granite wall runs along Boston Navy Yard's northern edge at Chelsea Street (formerly Salem Turnpike). The granite wall originally measured 2,400 feet (730 m) long and 9 feet (2.7 m) high, with foundations 3 feet (0.91 m) deep and a coping atop it. Much of the wall still remains, but part of the wall near the Ropewalk was replaced in the early 20th century with a granite-and-wrought iron fence. Other parts of the wall have been removed or incorporated into other buildings, and a short section was moved in the early 1980s. When ownership was split between the NPS and BRA in 1976, Gates 1 and 2 led to the NPS section, while Gate 5 was the only direct access point to the BRA section.

Gate	Location	Additional information
Gate 1	West end of 1st Ave. 42.3730°N 71.0576°W	Has a fence and a swinging gate, adjacent to the Building 267 gatehouse. Led to Water Street, but closed to vehicles after Gate 4 was expanded in 1984.
Gate 2	West end of 2nd Ave. 42.3734°N 71.0577°W	Has a swinging vehicular gate and pedestrian doorway, built during World War II. Led to Henley Street. Closed to vehicles after Gate 4 was expanded in 1984.
Gate 3	Courtyard of Building I 42.3750°N 71.0566°W	Has iron gates and granite newel posts; closed to all visitors.
Gate 4	North end of 5th St. 42.3752°N 71.0560°W	Has concrete columns supporting a granite lintel. Originally a pedestrian-only entrance to Chelsea Street. A vehicular expansion was completed between 1978 and 1984, requiring buildings 136 and 198 to be demolished.
Gate 5	Northwest end of 13th St. 42.3787°N 71.0525°W	Leads to Chelsea Street.
Gate 6	Northwest end of 16th St. 42.3794°N 71.0519°W	Leads to Chelsea Street. Completed in 1997, requiring the demolition of part of Building 114.
Curtain Gate	Constitution Rd. 42.3727°N 71.0576°W	Leads to a parking area near the Constitution wharf near the Hoosac Stores. Includes two openings in a concrete wall, each with rolldown gates. Added in 1955.
Railroad Gate	Constitution Rd. 42.3723°N 71.0580°W	Abuts the former Hoosac Stores

=== Open spaces ===
A Marine parade ground is located in front of the Marine barracks. The parade ground has evergreen trees and box hedges at its periphery, along with a horseshoe-shaped asphalt loop. A retaining wall, in the parade ground, surrounds a water tank. A Japanese-style Torii gate is at the parade ground's northern end. For most of its history, the 1.35 acres (0.55 ha) surrounding the parade ground has been part of the Navy Yard; the land was controlled by the U.S. Marine Corps between 1964 and 1974.

The redeveloped shipyard contains Charlestown Naval Shipyard Park, a rectangle spanning 12 acres (4.9 ha) or 16 acres (6.5 ha). It has playgrounds and fountains juxtaposed with landscape features such as meadows. The park also includes a pavilion (adapted from a former building) and an adjacent marina.

== Notable structures ==
When Boston Navy Yard functioned as a military installation, it had 161 buildings and several docks, piers, and slipways. All structures, including piers, were given an alphabetical or numerical designation from the late 1860s onward. Some redeveloped buildings have been given names, but the United States Postal Service continues to use the official building names or numbers assigned by the Navy.

=== Buildings ===
==== Extant buildings ====
Many buildings remain from the Navy Yard's use as a military facility. (Note: For maps of the buildings, see: Western portion of the yard (Boston National Historical Park): Boston National Historical Park Superintendent's Compendium: Map C.1: Public Assembly Areas, Charlestown Navy Yard (PDF) (Map). National Park Service.; Whole site: Charlestown Navy Yard: Boston National Historical Park, Massachusetts (Map). 2017 – via Project Gutenberg.) Buildings in the below list include those in Boston National Historical Park. The 1970s redevelopment proposal also mandated that twenty-one buildings in the Historic Monument Area, (Note: Calisti 1992, p. 16, cites a separate figure of 22 buildings in the Historic Monument Area.) six buildings in the New Development Area, and one building in the Shipyard Park area be preserved. (Note: The numeric designations of the buildings to be preserved are as follows: Shipyard Park: 123; Historic Monument Area: Quarters P; 31, 33, 34, 36, 38, 39, 58, 60, 62, 75, 79, 96, 105, 106, 107, 108 (partial), 114, 120, 149, 199, and 266; New Development Area: 40, 42, 103, 104, 197, and 228) The Historic Monument Area buildings date mostly from the 19th century and contain a combined 2,000,000 square feet (190,000 m^{2}).

Building no.	Name	Location	Completed (Note: Completion dates are referenced in the "Additional information" column except when a specific reference is provided.)	Additional information
Quarters G	Commandant's House	Upper Yard (Chelsea St.) 42.3745°N 71.0571°W	1805	A brick building housing the commandant. Measuring 2 1/2 stories high, it has a main section (48 by 39 feet (15 by 12 m) across) with a gable roof. An L-shaped kitchen, dating from the 1930s, has a hip roof. Inside are 17 rooms. Quarters G also had a greenhouse between the 1840s and 1963, along with outbuildings such as a stable and barn. It housed the yard commandant until 1945 and the First Naval District commandant afterward.
Quarters I	Marine Barracks	Upper Yard (5th & Chelsea Sts.) 42.3749°N 71.0565°W	1811	A 4-story brick building with wings to the north, west, and east. It is the U.S.'s oldest marine barracks. It has wings for officers' families and a central section for enlisted bachelors. The wings, each 20 feet (6.1 m) wide and 50 or 60 feet (15 or 18 m) long, were known as Quarters H and K. The central section is 141 by 22 feet (43.0 by 6.7 m) across.
Quarters P	Residence of the Captain of the Yard	Lower Yard 42.3789°N 71.0519°W	1913	A brick structure adjoining the Lower Officers' Quarters (Building 266 / Quarters L–O). It housed the yard captain until 1945 and the yard commandant afterward. It was redeveloped as an office building.
1	Gate House / Garages	Upper Yard (2nd Ave. near Constitution Rd.) 42.3736°N 71.0578°W	1936	A one-story, L-shaped building with a brick facade and flat roof. Most of the building is devoted to garage use, except the northern end, which is the former chauffeur's quarters.
4	Chief Petty Officers Club	Waterfront (1st Ave.) 42.3729°N 71.0573°W	1827	A two-story trapezoidal brick building. It was built by private developers and later became part of the Navy Yard.
5	Bachelors Officers' Quarters / Open Mess	Waterfront (south of 1st Ave.) 42.3731°N 71.0569°W	1813	A three-story trapezoidal building with a brick facade and hip roof, along with a one-story annex on the south elevation. Building 5 was originally a warehouse. It later served a variety of purposes, including retail, library, offices, and museum; from World War II onward, it was the bachelor officers' quarters and open mess. Since 2008 it has been a visitor center. A plaque on the north elevation (1936) commemorates the arrival of British troops for the Battle of Bunker Hill in 1775.
10	Battery Charging Facility	Waterfront (south of 1st Ave.) 42.3727°N 71.0555°W	1853	A two-story rectangular building in the Greek Revival or Federal style. It measures 50 by 35 feet (15 by 11 m) with a brick facade. Originally a pitch manufacturing plant for roofs, it was adapted for multiple uses throughout the years, including a radio transmitter station. It was extended northward in the 1940s and has been a galley since 1976.
19	Scale House	Upper Yard (south of 1st Ave.) 42.3742°N 71.0555°W	1873	A small Classical Revival brick building. Served as a scale house during military operation.
21	Carriage House	Upper Yard (next to the Commandant's House) 42.3747°N 71.0570°W	1825	A 28-by-29-foot (8.5 by 8.8 m) granite building. Constructed as a stable and carriage house, but also used as a greenhouse, guardhouse, and servant's house.
22	Ship Repair Shop	Waterfront (south of 1st Ave.) 42.3739°N 71.0555°W	1833	A three-story, L-shaped granite structure connected with Building 28. Designed by Alexander Parris, it originally hosted pumps for Dry Dock 1. Repeatedly repurposed, it held various functions including a woodworking shop and industrial hygiene lab by 1973. It was redeveloped as the USS Constitution Museum.
24	Riggers' and Laborers' Shop / Carpenters & Joiners Shop	Waterfront (Baxter Rd.) 42.3735°N 71.0548°W	1849	A three-story granite and brick structure measuring 200 by 70 feet (61 by 21 m) across. Originally a carpentry shop; repeatedly repurposed, it held various functions including a riggers' and laborers' shop by 1973. Redeveloped for the Naval History and Heritage Command's Detachment Boston.
28	Instrumentation Calibration Shop	Waterfront (Baxter Rd. & 1st Ave.) 42.3741°N 71.0551°W	1849	A two-story brick structure with a gable roof; the second story dates from 1866. During military operation, it housed various workshops, labs, and dining rooms. It was redeveloped as the USS Constitution Museum.
31	Muster House	Upper Yard (5th St.) 42.3750°N 71.0555°W	1852–1854	An octagonal brick building surrounded by a porch. The first two stories are original, while the third story dates from a 1871 modification. Originally used for muster and later as a telephone exchange and a clinic. It was redeveloped as office space.
32	Bank / Shell House	Upper Yard (5th St.) 42.3748°N 71.0550°W	1857	A one-story, 75-by-52-foot (23 by 16 m) structure designed by Joseph Billings. The original structure is a Renaissance Revival brick building, and there is a one-story northern annex of wood frame. Originally a shell house and repeatedly repurposed, it was a bank by 1973.
33	Sail Loft / Billings Building	Lower Yard (3rd Ave.) 42.3755°N 71.0548°W	1850–1852	A three-story granite structure that originally functioned as a sail loft. Repeatedly repurposed, it was a tailor's shop by 1973. It was redeveloped as a retail and office building in 1987, with an internal gallery.
34	Store House / Parris Building	Lower Yard (1st Ave.) 42.3752°N 71.0545°W	1848	A granite structure with brick walls. It was designed by Alexander Parris. It remained a storehouse through 1973 but also hosted labs at various points. It was redeveloped as a retail building in the 1980s, with offices.
36	Joiners Shop & Paint Loft / Ironsides Place	Lower Yard (1st Ave.) 42.3749°N 71.0540°W	1866	A granite structure, designed by Joseph Billings. It originally served as a joiners' shop and paint loft; repeatedly repurposed, it hosted a barracks and other amenities (e.g. cafeteria, shoe store) by 1973. It was redeveloped as a restaurant and office building in the 1980s.
38	Packing House & Cooperage / Cooper Building	Lower Yard (3rd Ave.) 42.3759°N 71.0541°W	1857	A granite structure, designed by Joseph Billings. It originally served as a cooperage; Repeatedly repurposed, it hosted amenities (e.g. library, theater, bowling alley, and club) by 1973. Following a fire, it was redeveloped as a retail and office building in the 1980s.
39	Ordnance Store / Carriage Building	Lower Yard (1st Ave.) 42.3757°N 71.0536°W	1866	A three-story brick and granite structure, designed by Joseph Billings. It originally served as an ordnance shop; repeatedly repurposed, it was an office by 1973. It was redeveloped as a retail and office building in the 1980s, with an arched passageway indoors.
40	Heavy Hammer House / Constitution Quarters Garage	Waterfront (1st Ave. between 8th & 9th Sts.) 42.3755°N 71.0532°W	1864	Designed by Joseph Billings. Originally a heavy hammer house; repeatedly repurposed, it was a locker facility by 1973. It was redeveloped as a 367-space parking garage.
42	Machine Shop, Foundry, Smithery / Constitution Quarters	Waterfront (8th St.) 42.3746°N 71.0512°W	1858	A four-story brick structure with a five-story atrium. It was designed by Joseph Billings. Originally a machine shop, foundry, and smithery; repeatedly repurposed, it had labs and offices by 1973. It was redeveloped as a 367-unit apartment building in 1981–1982.
58	Ropewalk	Lower Yard (next to Chelsea St.) 42.3765°N 71.0546°W	1836	A granite building with skylights, measuring 45 feet (14 m) wide and stretching over 1/4 mile (0.40 km). It was designed by Alexander Parris. The building consists of three functional sections: a Greek Revival pavilion to the east, a two-story central section spanning 830 feet (250 m), and a one-story western section spanning 440 feet (130 m). During military operation, it housed the ropewalk and intermittently offices. Following redevelopment, it became a 97-unit apartment building in 2021.
60	Tar House	Lower Yard (next to Chelsea St.) 42.3777°N 71.0531°W	1838	A two-story, 200-by-19-foot (61.0 by 5.8 m) granite building. It was designed by Alexander Parris. During military operation, it was the tar house for the Ropewalk. Following Boston Navy Yard's redevelopment, it was renovated as part of the Ropewalk.
62	Hemp House	Lower Yard (4th Ave.) 42.3778°N 71.0527°W	1837	A storage structure, designed by Alexander Parris. During military operation, it was the hemp house for the ropewalk. It was redeveloped as an office building in the 1980s.
75	Timber Shed	Lower Yard (3rd Ave. between 13th & 16th Sts.) 42.3779°N 71.0509°W	1848	A granite and wood storage structure. Repeatedly repurposed, it was a general warehouse by 1973. It was redeveloped as a commercial building in the 1980s.
79	Ropewalk Coal / Boiler House	Lower Yard (13th & Chelsea Sts.) 42.3785°N 71.0526°W	1852–1853	A two-story structure with a brick-and-granite facade and gable roof. It was originally a wire rope mill; pepeatedly repurposed, it was used for storage by 1973. It was redeveloped as a residential building in the 1980s.
96	Equipment Powerhouse for Ropewalk / Power House Substation	Lower Yard (13th & Chelsea Sts.) 42.3783°N 71.0526°W	1899	A structure with a hip roof. Repeatedly repurposed, it was a forklift and pump repair building by 1973. It was redeveloped for one commercial tenant in the 1980s.
103	Equipment Chain and Anchor Storage	Lower Yard (1st Ave. & 9th St.) 42.3757°N 71.0516°W	1903–1904	A two-story building made of granite and brick. Repeatedly repurposed, it was a sheet metal shop by 1973. It was redeveloped as an apartment building for the elderly in the 1980s, with about 110 units.
104	Shipfitters' Shop	Lower Yard (1st Ave. & 10th St.) 42.3765°N 71.0510°W	1903–1904	A three-story building made of brick. Repeatedly repurposed, it was a mold loft by 1973.
105	C&R Smithery and Power Plant / Chain Forge	Lower Yard (between 9th & 13th Sts, 1st & 2nd Aves.) 42.3768°N 71.0520°W	1904–1905	A two-story brick building, with a "hyphen" connector between two sections. The headhouse to the west is a two-story brick structure with hip roof, while the main shop to the east is a two-story brick facade with gable roof. Repeatedly repurposed, it was a rail maintenance facility and forge shop by 1973. It was redeveloped as an office and retail building in the 1980s.
106	Metalworkers' Shop / The Basilica	Lower Yard (1st Ave. between 13th & 16th Sts.) 42.3776°N 71.0506°W	1904	A brick building similar to Building 105. Repeatedly repurposed, it was a rail multipurpose storage facility by 1973. It was redeveloped as a 92-unit apartment building in the 1980s.
107	Public Works Shop	Lower Yard (3rd Ave.) 42.3762°N 71.0543°W	1904	A 2 1/2-story Classical Revival brick building measuring 60 by 200 feet (18 by 61 m) across, with a hip roof. Originally an office and shop; repeatedly repurposed, it was a paint shop by 1973.
109	Waterfront Office	Waterfront (on Pier 1) 42.3720°N 71.0551°W	1904	A two-story wood-frame building constructed around Pier 1's former electrical substation. Originally a coal pocket, rebuilt in 1944; it was a waterfront office by 1973.
110	Pitch House / Lead Room	Waterfront 42.3734°N 71.0543°W	1901	A one-story rectangular brick structure used as a pitch house and later as a blacksmith shop.
114	Sawmill and Spar Shop / Charlestown Boatyard	Lower Yard (16th St.) 42.3795°N 71.0510°W	1904	A two-story L-shaped building with a brick facade. Originally a sawmill and spar shop; it was a woodworking shop and substation by 1973. Following redevelopment plans in the 1980s, it became a biomedical center in 2001.
120	Dispensary / John Paul Jones House	Lower Yard (6th St.) 42.3752°N 71.0559°W	1905	Originally a dispensary; it retained that use through 1973 but also hosted medical offices. It was redeveloped as an office building in the 1980s.
123	Pump House for Dry Docks 1 and 2	Waterfront (Flagship Way) 42.3732°N 71.0527°W	1905	Originally a pump house; from 1946 to 1973, it also served as a substation.
124	Public Toilet	Waterfront (Baxter Rd.) 42.3739°N 71.0549°W	1903	A one-story brick building with metal roof. Functioned as a restroom through 1973.
125	Paint Shop	Waterfront (Baxter Rd.) 42.3732°N 71.0542°W	1907	A two-story Classical Revival brick building with gable and shed roofs. Functioned as a paint shop through 1973.
149	General Storehouse	Lower Yard (4th Ave.) 42.3772°N 71.0525°W	1918	An eight-story general storehouse built in two phases. Parts of the first six stories were completed in 1917, followed by the remainder the next year; the complete building has 637,000 square feet (59,200 m^{2}). Functioned as a storehouse through 1973. It was redeveloped as an office building in the 1980s.
197	Electronics and Electrical Building	Waterfront 42.3734°N 71.0520°W	1941	A Bauhaus-style structure with a steel, concrete, and brick facade. During military operation, it functioned as an electronics building. It was redeveloped as a 212-unit residential condominium in the 1980s, with additional wings.
199	General Storehouse	Lower Yard 42.3784°N 71.0513°W	1941	A concrete-frame structure with brick spandrels. During military operation, it functioned as a storehouse. It was redeveloped as an garage in the 1980s.
245	Grounds Equipment Shop	Upper Yard 42.3744°N 71.0567°W	1929	A utilitarian structure with wood cladding, originally built as a garage.
265	Upper Quarters / Married Officers' Quarters B–F	Upper Yard (3rd St.) 42.3734°N 71.0572°W	1833	A group of five Federal-style rowhouses. Each house measures 2 1/2 stories high, with brick facades, gable roofs, and chimneys.
266	Lower Quarters / Quarters L–O	Lower Yard 42.3789°N 71.0519°W	1829	A group of rowhouses with brick facades and a piece of the original granite wall. It was redeveloped as an office building in the 1980s.
267	Gatehouse, Gate 1	Lower Yard 42.3730°N 71.0574°W	—N/a	A brick gatehouse with a curtain wall of aluminum and glass.
269	Married Officers' Garages B–F	Upper Yard (north of Building 1) 42.3738°N 71.0578°W	1941	A one-story brick-and-concrete rectangular garage for the officers' quarters, with a flat roof.
M-1	Building M-1	Waterfront (Pier 1) 42.3718°N 71.0548°W	1942	A one-story structure with a shed roof, built as an emergency generator house. It is used as a shed.
M-39	Steam Box Shed	Waterfront (east of Dry Dock 1) 42.3731°N 71.0546°W	1975 (relocation)	A one-story structure with metal siding and a gable roof. Moved from Pier 1 c. 1975; the original construction date is unknown.

==== Buildings constructed after decommissioning ====
Name	Location	Completed	Additional information
Charlestown Navy Yard Rowhouses	Waterfront (1st Ave. and 13th St.) 42.3767°N 71.0504°W	1989	A 50-unit townhouse development
Constellation Wharf	Waterfront (Pier 7) 42.3740°N 71.0496°W	1987	A 64-unit condominium development
Constitution Inn	Lower Yard (150 3rd Ave.) 42.3764°N 71.0534°W	1991	A residential hotel-style building originally with 152 units, most of which were later converted into 100 apartments
HarborView	Waterfront (1st Ave.) 42.3774°N 71.0500°W	2008	A 260-unit apartment building
Shipways I and II	Waterfront 42.3760°N 71.0511°W	1984–1985	A series of brick townhouses on the former shipways. There are 48 residential condos along with 9 retail spaces.
Spaulding Rehabilitation Hospital	Lower Yard (16th St.) 42.3786°N 71.0490°W	2013	A 132-bed hospital

==== Former buildings ====
The following is a non-exhaustive list of former buildings at Charlestown (Boston) Navy Yard. Among these structures were four shiphouses, all destroyed by 1906. When Boston Navy Yard was an active military installation, various receiving ships were used as temporary barracks until 1933, when a receiving building was built ashore.

Building no.	Name	Completed	Demolished	Additional information
37	Returned Stores Inspection Shed	1864	1890	Designed by Joseph Billings.
48	Magazine	1863	By early 1930s	Designed by Joseph Billings.
49	Shed for Battery Guns	1866	By early 1930s	Designed by Joseph Billings.
67	Saw Mill	1868	1906	When the building was demolished in 1906, a small portion survived and was renumbered 130.
108	Power Plant / Anchor Building	1904	2022	A building with brick facade and concrete decorations, located at 3rd Avenue and 9th Street. Used as power and boiler house until 1906, then power plant from 1911 to 1973. Planned to be redeveloped as an office building in the 1980s, but demolished instead in 2022.
Quarters A	Guard House and Porter's Quarters	1817	1955	A guard house and an adjoining two-story porter's quarters.
Hoosac Stores	Hoosac Stores	1895	2025	A group of six-story brick warehouses.

=== Piers, dry docks, and slipways ===
The oldest piers, White Wharf and Shear's Wharf, are at Boston Navy Yard's western end. Originally officially labeled as "wharves", they were expanded and relabeled as "piers" in the early 20th century. The piers were assigned numbers in 1900, labeled 1–11 from west to east. Three piers are preserved by the NPS:

- Pier 1 (1901), a trapezoidal pier measuring 670 by 150 feet (204 by 46 m) across. It has a battery, ammunition bunker, and grit hoppers, and formerly had several buildings including a coal-handling plant. Three electric capstans on Pier 1, each about 3 feet (0.91 m) tall, are preserved as part of Boston National Historical Park. There are also three floodlight towers (structures 238–240).
- Pier 2 (1906), measuring 500 by 70 feet (152 by 21 m) across, with railroad tracks. A marginal wharf, with a timber bulkhead and piers, connected with Pier 3 from c. 1900 until the Marine Railway was built in 1919; part of the marginal wharf survives.
- Finger Pier (1946, relocated 1962), a concrete L-shaped pier, parallels Pier 1.

Other notable wharves included piers 3 and 4, which measured 60 feet (18 m) wide and flanked Dry Dock 2; piers 5 and 6, which measured 70 feet (21 m) wide; and Pier 10, which connected with the receiving ship.

Boston Navy Yard also has three dry docks numbered 1, 2, and 5 (dry docks 3 and 4 are located in the South Boston Naval Annex).

Dry Dock no.	Material of which dock is constructed	Length	Width	Depth	Completed	Additional information	Ref
1	Granite	348 feet 11 inches (106.35 m)	86 feet (26 m)	25 feet 5 inches (7.75 m)	1833	Dry Dock 1 has a stepped granite basin and a steel caisson that can seal the basin from the harbor. It was expanded in 1860 and 1947–1948.	
2	Granite and concrete	719 feet 1 inch (219.18 m)	114 feet (35 m)	30 feet 4 inches (9.25 m)	1905	Dry Dock 2 has a granite and concrete basin shaped like an inverted arch. It incorporates over 11,200 blocks of New Hampshire granite. A steel caisson can seal the basin from the harbor.	
5	Concrete and steel	518 feet 3 inches (157.96 m)	98 feet 6 inches (30.02 m)	21 feet (6.4 m)	1942	Dry Dock 5 was converted from a shipway in 1944. There originally were weep holes to allow for groundwater drainage, although the pumps sometimes took up to 20 hours to drain the dry dock. There was also a swinging gate.	

As of 1 January 1946
Shipbuilding ways	Width	Length	Ref
1	100 feet (30 m)	445 feet (136 m)	
2	110 feet (34 m)	425 feet (130 m)	

== Notable ships ==
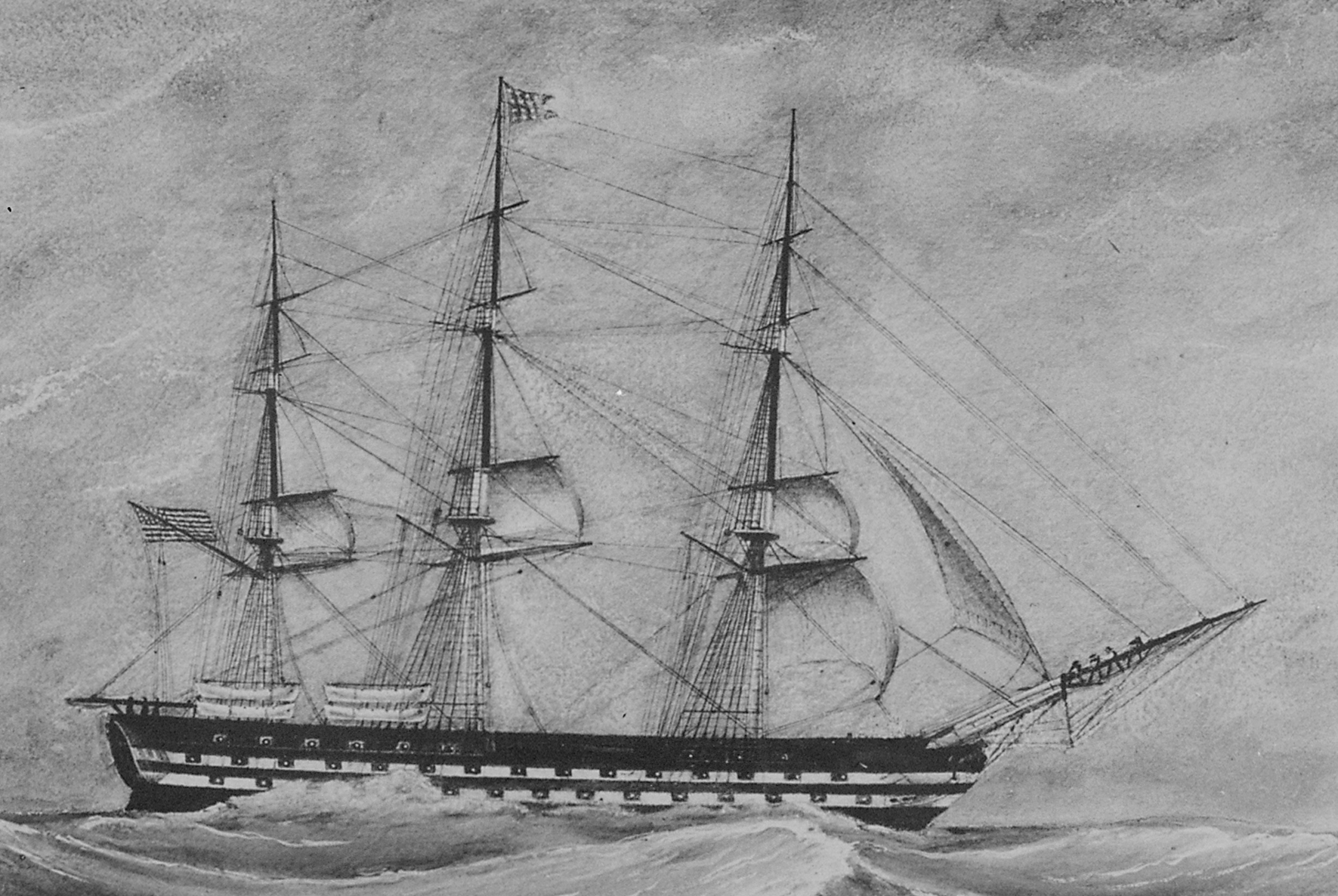
Independence (1814), the first vessel built at Boston Navy Yard

Over 200 warships were built at Charlestown (Boston) Navy Yard in its history. The sloop Frolic, launched on 11 September 1813, was the first to be launched from there; sometimes cited as the first vessel built there, Frolic was actually built nearby. Ship construction began in earnest that year, when the yard began constructing one of four 74-guns approved by Congress; this became the three-masted ship Independence, the first U.S. ship of the line, was completed in 1814. Before Dry Dock 1 was completed, shipbuilding was concentrated in the shiphouses. The yard built vessels such as Warren (1827), Falmouth (1828), Cyane (1837), Plymouth (1844), and Cumberland (1842) in the early and mid-19th century. Vermont, launched in 1848, (Note: However, Vermont was laid down in 1818.) was the last sail-propelled warship manufactured at Charlestown. By the 1850s, Charlestown was manufacturing vessels such as the screw-driven steam frigate Merrimack (1855) and the gunboat Hartford (1858). During the Civil War, Charlestown manufactured cruisers, gunboats, monitors, and sloops-of-war, and it launched ships such as the monitor Monadnock (1863). By 1868, over forty vessels had been built there.

Well into the 1870s, Charlestown continued constructing wooden vessels, even as other U.S. Navy yards built steel vessels. The experimental torpedo boat Intrepid (1874) was the exception to the yard's general lack of technologically-advanced craft. Vandalia (1876), a screw sloop-of-war, was the yard's last wooden warship. In 1898, Boston Navy Yard converted Vulcan into a repair vessel, the first in the Navy's fleet. The Pentucket, launched in 1903, was the first vessel launched there in three decades. Until World War I, the yard mostly built small craft. Charlestown Navy Yard became involved with creating auxiliary ships in 1912, when it converted Vestal to an auxiliary ship. As a vessel conversion facility during World War I, the yard refurbished civilian ships as mine planters, such as the steamers Oglala and Bunker Hill. In the 1930s, it began constructing destroyers, following a six-decade hiatus in warship construction. The first such destroyer was Macdonough (1934); the yard constructed 16 destroyers through the decade.

During World War II, Boston Navy Yard converted vessels for combat, such as minelayers and minesweepers, and it continued to build destroyers. It also built over 60 destroyer escorts (DEs), among them 12 BDE-class escorts for the Royal Navy. The Navy prioritized the manufacture of certain vessel types at Boston Navy Yard, including DEs and about 150 landing craft mechanized (LCM). The yard manufactured more of either type in a single month than any other shipyard nationwide, with 110 LCMs in August 1942 and five DEs in July 1943. Boston constructed barracks ships including Mercer and Nueces, as well as small seaplane tenders and dock landing ships. The yard also built submarines, of which one, Lancetfish (1945), sank there after commissioning. Projects during the 1950s included converting Gyatt into the world's first guided missile destroyer and an extensive reconstruction of Albany, the flagship of the Navy's heavy cruiser conversion program. Warship construction ceased with Suffolk County, a tank landing ship launched on 5 September 1956. After Suffolk County, the yard continued commissioning and repairing vessels; the last ship to be launched from Boston Navy Yard was Kalamazoo on 11 August 1973. Nantucket was commissioned at Boston Navy Yard in 2024.

== Commandants ==
The military officer in charge of Boston Navy Yard was the commandant (originally the superintendent). Commandants have included:

Commandants
Commandant	Start	End	Ref
Samuel Nicholson	1800–1801	1811	
William Bainbridge	1812	1813	
Isaac Hull	1813	1822	
William Bainbridge	1822	1824	
William M. Crane	1825	1826	
Charles Morris	1827	1832	
William Bainbridge	1832	1833	
Jesse Elliott	1833	1835	
John Downes	1835	1842	
Francis Gregory	1852	1855	
Silas H. Stringham	1855	1859	
William L. Hudson	1859	1862	
John B. Montgomery	1862	1863	
Silas H. Stringham	1863	1866	
John Rogers	1866	1869	
Charles Steedman	1869	1872	
Enoch Parrott	1872	1873	
Edward T. Nichols	1873	1876	
Foxhall A. Parker Jr.	1876	1878	
William F. Spicer	1878	1878	
George M. Ransom	1878	1882	
Oscar C. Badger	1882	1885	
Louis Kimberly	1885	1887	
William P. McCann	1887	1890	
Thomas O. Selfridge	1890	1893	
Joseph Fyffe	1893	1894	
Joseph N. Miller	1894	1897	
Henry L. Howison	1897	1899	
Henry F. Picking	1899	1899	
William T. Sampson	1899	1901	
Mortimer L. Johnson	1901	1904	
George F. F. Wilde	1904	1905	
Albert S. Snow	1905	1907	
William Swift	1907	1909	
John C. Fremont Jr.	1909	1911	
DeWitt Coffman	1911	1914	
William R. Rush	1914	1919	
Samuel Robison	1919	1921	
Albert Gleaves	1921	1921	
Henry A. Wiley	1921	1923	
Louis R. de Steiguer	1923	1925	
Philip Andrews	1925	1930	
Louis M. Nulton	1930	1933	
Henry M. Hough	1933	1935	
Walter Gherardi	1935	1938	
William T. Tarrant	1938	1942	
Wilson Brown	1942	1943	
Robert A. Theobald	1943	1944	
Felix Gygax	1944	1945	
Adrian R. Marron	1945	1946	
Wesley McL Hague	1946	1949	
R. Morgan Watt Jr.	1949	1950	
Pleasant D. Gold Jr.	1950	1954	
Philip W. Snyder	1954	1955	
William E. Howard Jr.	1955	1959	
Fred Ruhlman	1959	1960	
William A. Brockett	1960	1962	
Frank C. Jones	1962	1966	
Stuart C. Jones	1966	1968	
Robert C. Gooding	1968	1969	
Raymond W. Burk	1969	1972	
Russel L. Arthur	1972	1974	

== Annexes ==
Naval installations in Boston in World War II

Boston Navy Yard had several physically-separate annexes along Boston Harbor in the early 20th century (particularly during World War II). They operated in tandem with the main complex in Charlestown.

Name	Location	Annexed date	Additional information
Chelsea Naval Annex	Chelsea	1910s	Fully developed in the 1940s, it had two marine railways. It equipped smaller craft during World War II and was decommissioned in 1949.
Lockwood's Basin–East Boston Annex	East Boston, Boston	1919	Included a pier, a marine railway, and several buildings, and was leased to Massachusetts's Bureau of Marine Fisheries in the 1930s. Lockwood's Depot repaired smaller craft during World War II and was decommissioned in 1948.
Nahant Annex	Nahant	1957	Initially consisted of a tower operated under agreement with the Coast Guard. In 1965 the Navy obtained an adjacent 8.5 acres (3.4 ha), but the Nahant Annex was never fully developed.
Naval Fuel Annex	Orient Heights, Boston	1942	Included two fuel tanks, pipelines, and associated infrastructure. The pipeline ran along an abandoned railroad track to a fuel pier in East Boston. It was decommissioned in 1961.
Net Depot	South Boston, Boston	by 1940s	Included a pier, net-weaving facility, and building. It adjoined a pier leased from the Massachusetts government.
South Boston Naval Annex	South Boston, Boston	1920	Initially, it had one dry dock (completed 1919) and two wooden piers. The annex was more comprehensively developed in the 1940s, with a second dry dock. After World War II, the annex had over 25 new buildings across 66.5 acres (26.9 ha). It was decommissioned along with the main complex in 1974. Two facilities were affiliated with the South Boston Annex: E Street Annex, which had storage areas and a wharf. It was transferred to Massport in 1969.; K Street Annex, which had a salvage yard and firefighting school. It was decommissioned in 1958.

== Modern operation ==
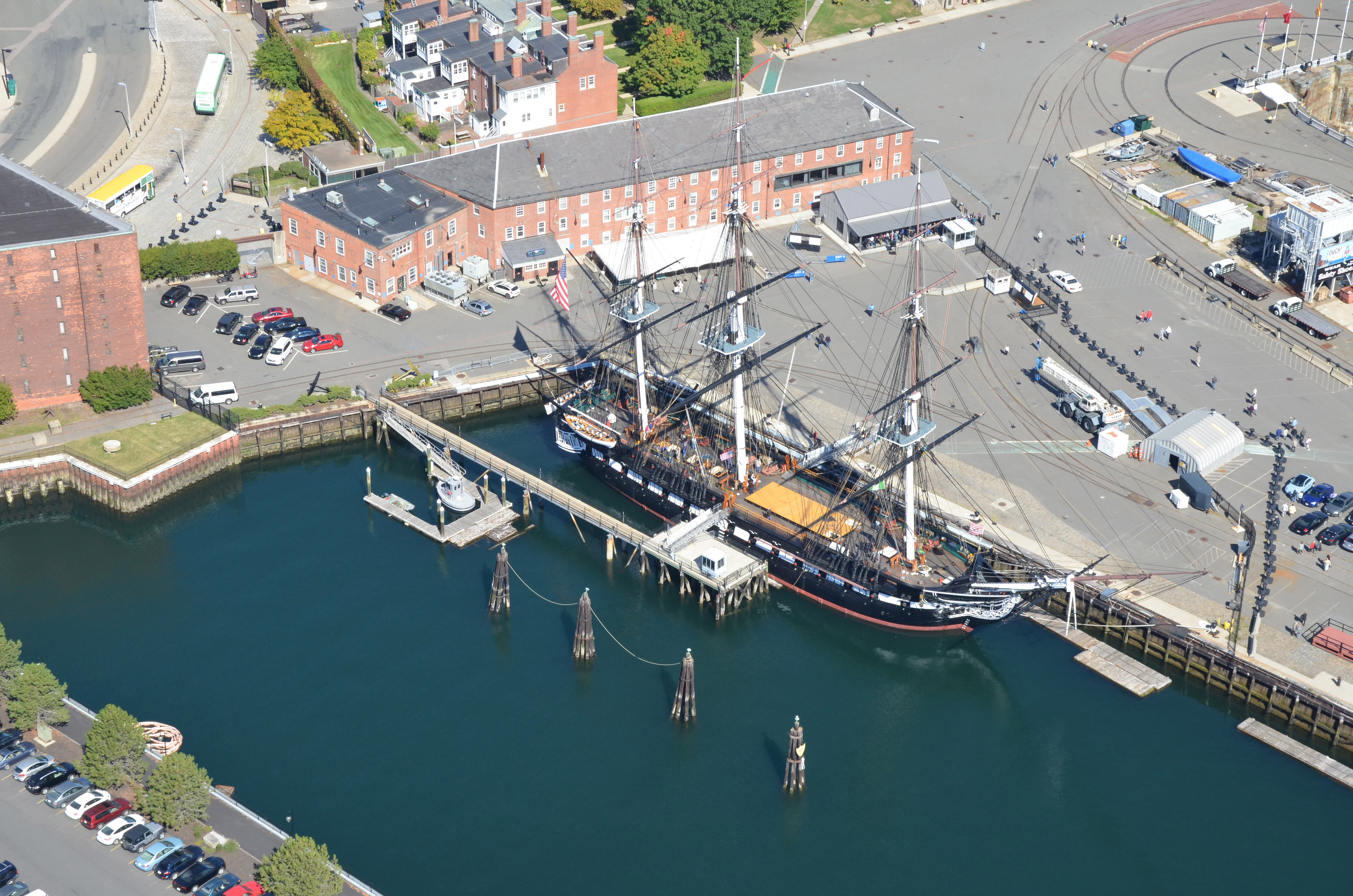
Aerial view of Boston Navy Yard's waterfront, with Constitution at center right

The NPS section of the yard, within Boston National Historical Park, is leased mainly to the U.S. Navy. The USS Constitution Museum is also housed within the NPS section. Other notable NPS tenants include the BPDA, the Boston Marine Society, and the Massachusetts Environmental Police, along with the NPS's North Atlantic Historic Preservation Center and its Olmsted Center. Former tenants of the NPS buildings have included the Hull Lifesaving Museum, Boston Academy of Music, and the NPS's Northeast Museum Services Center. Documents and artifacts relating to the complex's history are held by the NPS on long-term loan from the Navy. Other objects have been donated by private citizens, including former employees.

The BPDA's commercial space is largely occupied by the Massachusetts Water Resources Authority and the MGH Institute of Health Professions. Following the redevelopment, the BPDA section was originally not open to the public; it began to host events in the 1980s. These events have included Harborpark Day, maritime festivals, and the Chowda Fest food festival. It has also hosted reenactments, film screenings, theatrical performances, and the Visiting Ships program, and the various buildings are also rented out for events.

=== Ships exhibited ===
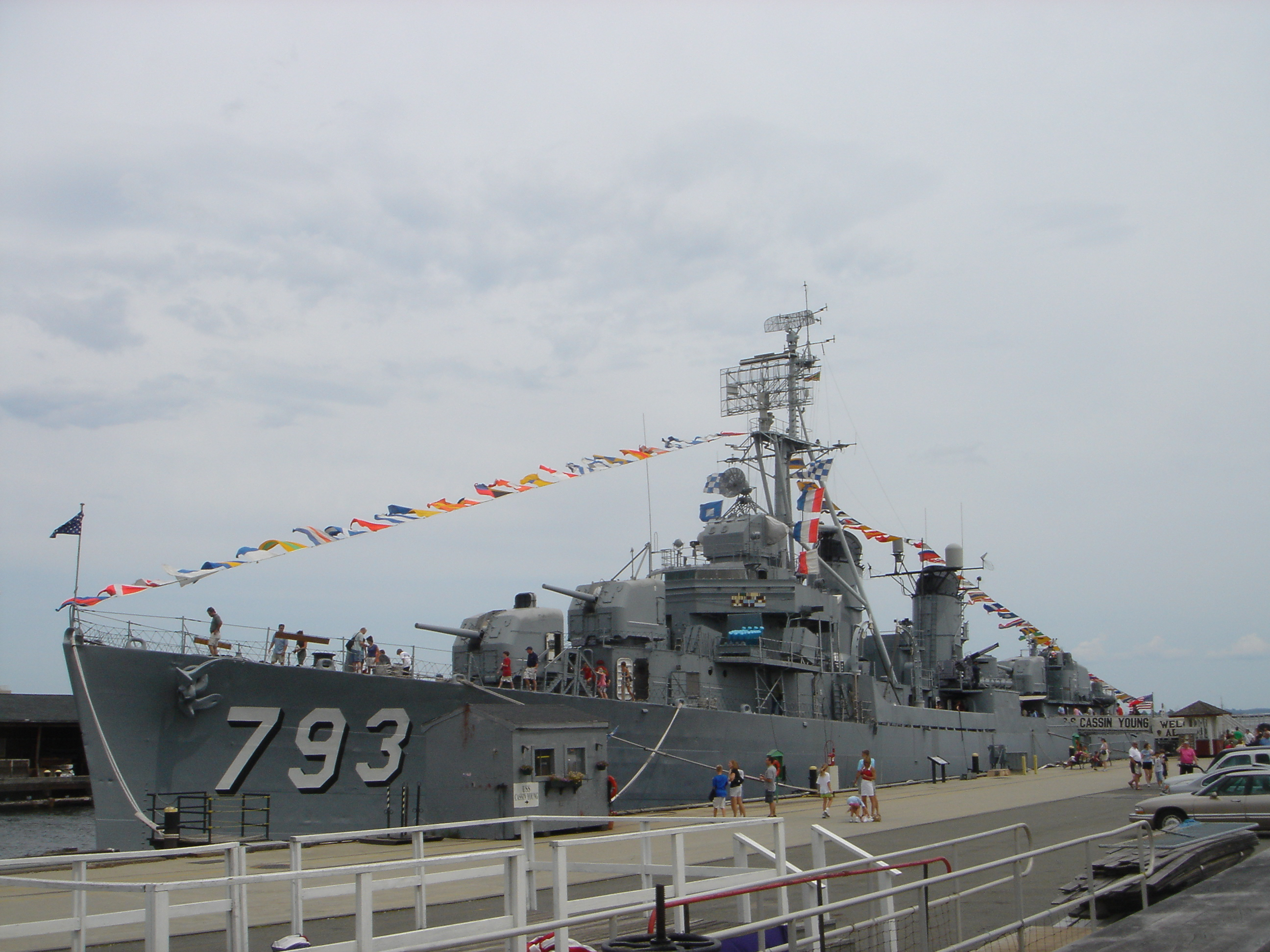
Cassin Young berthed at Boston Navy Yard

Boston Navy Yard hosts two ships, Constitution and Cassin Young, which are tied up at Pier 1 and open to the public. Constitution ("Old Ironsides"), a frigate launched in 1797, is the oldest still-commissioned warship in the world. Constitution is open to the public and sails around the harbor multiple times annually. Cassin Young, a Fletcher-class destroyer commissioned in 1943, is used exclusively as a museum ship. Dry Dock 1 is still used for maintenance of Constitution and Cassin Young.

Ships docked at Boston Navy Yard (permanent/long term)
Name	Location	Displacement	Length	Beam	Draft	Speed	Ref
Cassin Young	Pier 1 42.3722°N 71.0545°W	2,050 tons (standard), 2,924 tons (full)	376 5/12 ft (114.7 m)	39 7/12 ft (12.1 m)	13 9/12 ft (4.2 m) (Note: National Park Service 2015, p. 7.26, cites the draft as 17 6/12 ft (5.3 m).)	36.5 knots (67.6 km/h; 42.0 mph)	
Constitution	Pier 1 42.3725°N 71.0566°W	2,200 tons	175 ft (53 m) (at waterline)	43 6/12 ft (13.3 m)	21 ft (6.4 m) forward; 23 ft (7.0 m) aft; 14 3/12 ft (4.3 m) (hold depth)	13 knots (24 km/h; 15 mph)	

=== Transportation ===
The MBTA subway's City Square station, closed in 1975, was just outside the yard. In 1987, a temporary ferry began traveling from Pier 4 to Downtown Boston's Long Wharf to alleviate traffic congestion. The ferry was later made permanent, becoming the MBTA ferry's Charlestown route. From 1988 to 1997, the MBTA bus system operated a shuttle route within the yard. The Navy Yard is also served by some trips on the 93 bus and by private shuttles operated by the yard's employers. The complex includes both parking garages (including one with 1,300 spaces) and on-street parking.

== Awards and landmark designations ==
In the 1960s, both the NPS and the Navy studied the yard as part of a nationwide survey of potentially historic places. Boston Navy Yard was designated a National Historic Landmark (NHL) district on 13 November 1966. (Note: Carlson 2010a, pp. 196–197, gives a different date of 15 November 1966, which conflicts with the 13 November date given by the NPS's official records.) The NHL nomination form cited the complex's significance in shipway and dry dock technologies and as a major ropemaking facility. The complex is also on the Massachusetts State Register of Historic Places and National Register of Historic Places (NRHP) by virtue of being a NHL. A marker commemorating the NHL designation was installed in 1968. Boston Navy Yard is one of eight sites in the 43-acre (17 ha) Boston National Historical Park, which was designated in 1974. Only the portion of the yard near Constitution's berthing site is a contributing property to the national park.

Constitution and Cassin Young are both also NHLs, separate from the Navy Yard's landmark designation. Individual NRHP nominations for several structures in the yard were prepared in the 1970s, though these buildings were never formally nominated. Dry Dock 1 is a National Historic Civil Engineering Landmark, and the Ropewalk is designated as a Boston Landmark. In 1994, the Urban Land Institute granted Boston Navy Yard's redevelopment an Award for Excellence, while one of the rowhouse developments received the American Institute of Architects' (AIA) Honor Award.

== See also ==
- Port of Boston
- List of National Historic Landmarks in Boston
- National Register of Historic Places listings in northern Boston, Massachusetts
- List of military installations in Massachusetts
