= Henry F. Picking =

American rear admiral

- Born: Henry Forry Picking; January 20, 1840; Somerset, PA, U.S.
- Died: September 8, 1899 (aged 59) Boston, MA, U.S.
- Allegiance: United States of America
- Branch: United States Navy
- Service years: 1857–1899 (USN)
- Conflicts: Civil War; Sinking of the Petrel; Battle of Hampton Roads; USS St. Lawrence (1848); USS Nahant (1862)

Commandant of Navy Yard, Boston
- In office August 31, 1898 – September 8, 1899
- Succeeded by: William T. Sampson

Henry F. Picking (1840-1899) was an American rear admiral.

== Biography ==
Pickering began his 42-year naval career in the company of William T. Sampson as midshipmen at the U.S. Naval Academy at Annapolis. The both Picking and Sampson graduated in April 1861 just as the Civil War began.

CIVIL WAR Henry Picking was assigned to the U.S. frigate St. Lawrence which participated in the Battle of Hampton Roads where they captured the Confederate ships Herald and Jenny Lee followed by the ramming and sinking of the Petrel. Next Lt. Picking was assigned to the U.S.S. Nahant iron-clad monitor.

POST CIVIL WAR Post Civil War, Lt. Commander Picking served on the U.S.S. Swatara, frigate Colorado under RADM Rodgers, then as Commander on the U.S.S. Michigan and the U.S.S. Kearsarge.

His final ship was as Captain of the cruiser U.S.S. Charleston in 1895. Captain Picking served at the U.S. Navy Yard, New York during the Spanish–American War and in August 1998, Commodore Picking became Commandant of the U.S. Navy Yard, Boston where he finished out his career.

On March 3, 1899, former classmates and now Commodores Picking and Sampson were both promoted to rear admiral serving under Admiral Dewey at a time when the U.S. Navy consisted of only six active admirals (Compared to approximately 290 active admirals today)
