= Lexington Women's Liberty Monument =

Historic Monument honoring women in Lexington, Massachusetts

Coordinates: 42°26′56″N 71°13′46″W

The Lexington Women's Liberty Monument (subtitle: Something Is Being Done!) is a monument in the main historic district of Lexington, Massachusetts that honors the contributions by Lexington women from the colonial era through to the twenty-first century. Initiated and sponsored by the non-profit group LexSeeHer, it was unveiled in May 2024. It is the work of sculptor Meredith Bergmann, who worked collaboratively with LexSeeHer members and other volunteers from the town on the overall design including decisions about which women would be represented.

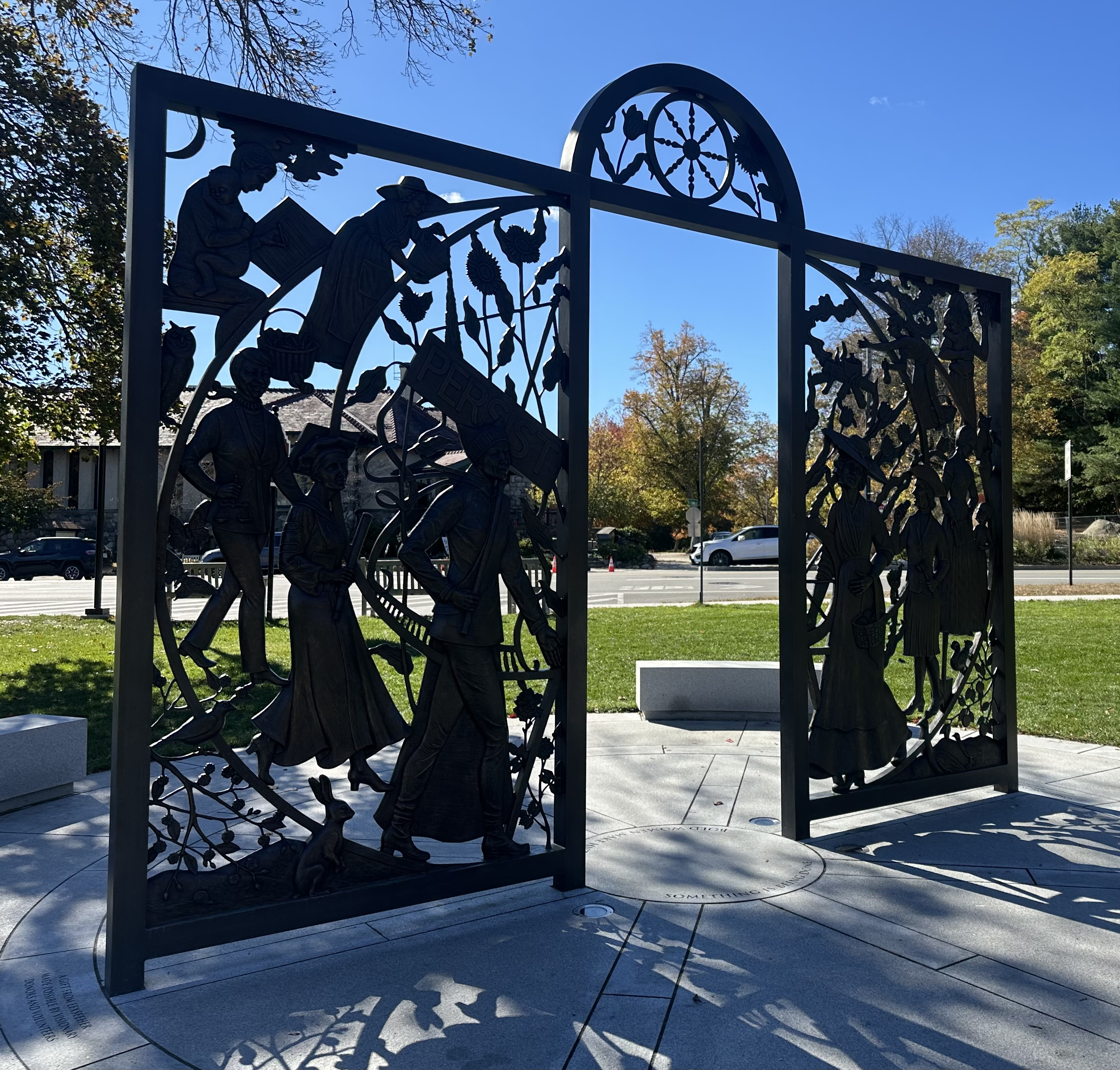
The Lexington Women's Liberty Monument in Lexington, Massachusetts

== Description ==
The Lexington Women's Liberty Monument (subtitled: Something Is Being Done!) is in the form of a bronze gateway with depictions on each side of women who have made a historical or cultural mark. The work was designed and created by sculptor Meredith Bergmann in collaboration with members of LexSeeHer and other town participants. It is located on the grounds of the Lexington Visitor Center, directly across from the Lexington Battle Green. The subtitle "Something Is Being Done!" mirrors the call made by Abigail Harrington on April 19, 1775 before the first battle of the Revolutionary War. She was warning her son and other members of the local militia of the impending arrival of British troops. Awakening her son she is said to have cried "The reg'lars are out, and something must be done!"

The women represented in the monument include:

Women represented	Description
Phebe Banister Burdoo	Member of a free Black farming family who contributed to the community during the colonial period. She was the mother of Eli Burdoo who fought as a member of the Lexington Militia in 1775
Margaret Tulip	An enslaved woman who pursued and won her freedom in 1768
Anna Munroe Harrington	Initiated the spinning protest that complained on increased taxes on imported textiles in 1769
Cate Chester	An enslaved woman who negotiated for her freedom in 1772
Tea Burner	A depiction of women who aprticipated in Lexington's Tea Burning protest, which occurred in 1773 three days before the Boston Tea Party
Ruth Stone Buckman	A tavern owner during the American Revolution
Abigail Moore Dunster Harrington	Helped rouse the Lexington militia as the British approached for the first battle of the American Revolution on April 19, 1775
Eliza Lee Cabot Follen	Author and abolitionist
Mary Elizabeth Miles Bigg Cary	Abolitionist, educator and scholar
Julia Robbins Barrett,	Artist, abolitionist, and suffragist
Ellen Adelia Stone	Suffragist and patron
Cecila Payne-Gaposchkin	Astronomer and astrophysicist
Ada Clapham Govan	Author and ornithologist
Peggy Arnold Ruth Kimball	Aviator, artist and non-profit founder
Jean B. Fletcher & Sarah P. Harkness	Mid-century modern architects, among the founding partners of The Architects Collaborative
Ruth Helen Winchester Morey	Local government trailblazer
Janet Reeve Haas	Educator and musician
Margery Milne Battin	Government leader
Sylvia Grace-Ferrel-Jones	Racial justice advocate
Storytellers across Time	A depiction of women who pass along stories from their ancestors
21st Century Protestors	A depiction of women who protested the election of Donald Trump, carrying a "Persist" sign and wearing a pussy hat

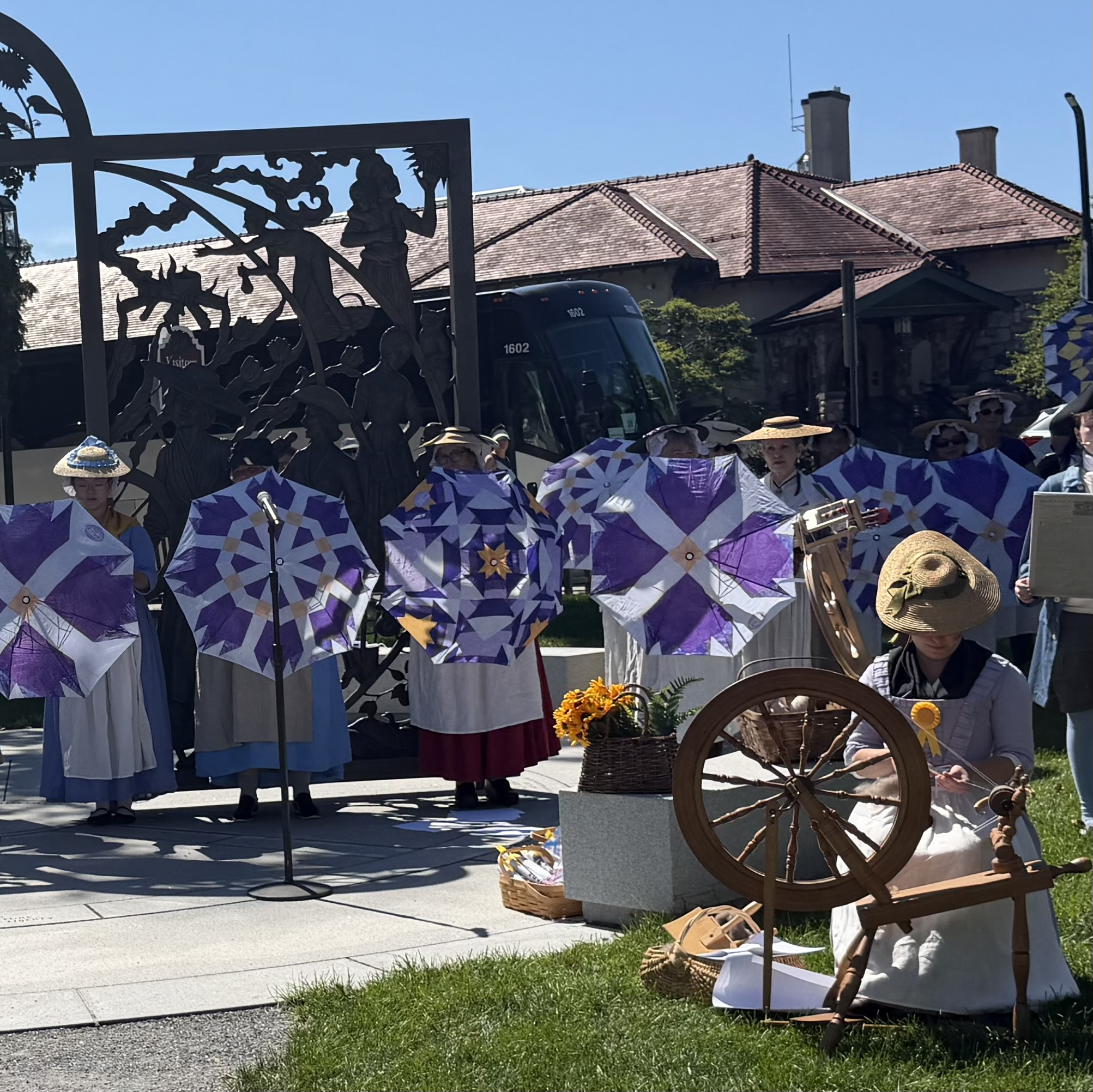
Spinning protest re-enactment in front of the monument on August 29, 2026

== Lexington's Monuments ==
Lexington's historic Town Center contains many monuments that memorialize military battles, war dead, and notable residents. Before the development of the Lexington Women's Liberty Monument, there were few monuments in Lexington representing the contributions of women, despite many existing records of women's participation in important historical events. During the Lexington Select Board meeting to discuss approval of the monument, one member of the Board noted that "Lexington has monuments and memorials naming 227 men – and just six women". Jessie Steigerwald, founder and President of LexSeeHer, considered this lack of representation in monuments to be evidence of social norms that generally erased women's and girl's stories, particularly the narratives of women of color.

== Implementing the Idea ==
The monument's implementation can be described as a series of steps: 1) originate and flesh out the concept, 2) fundraising, 3) select an artist, 4) develop the design, 5) acquire approval from town government for the monument's installation on town land, 6) agree to a location, and 7) create and install the completed monument. This overall process took four years.

The idea to create a monument focused on the contributions of women in Lexington was initiated in March 2020. It began with a group who had organized to create a visual tableau of women in period costumes celebrating 100 years of women's right to vote. In the group's effort to represent these women for the Centennial, an idea began to germinate to address the lack of representation of women in Lexington's monuments.

After an initial fundraising program, LexSeeHer issued a Call to Artists challenge with Meredith Bergmann's sketched ideas eventually being selected. Bergmann was already known as the sculptor of the Boston Women's Memorial on Commonwealth Avenue Mall in Boston, which was unveiled in 2003. Hundreds of hours went into making detailed conceptual sketches leading to the eventual construction of a full-scale clay model. This model was then brought to a foundry where the final bronze monument was created using the lost-wax method.

Determining an appropriate location for the monument in the Town Center caused controversy. Some believed that space on the Battle Green should be reserved for war veterans' memorials. LexSeeHer advocates noted that women were involved in helping the wounded and otherwise supporting the Revolutionary War effort. A leader of the Massachusetts Tribal Council pointed out that all of the Battle Green monuments sit on the homelands of the Massachusett tribe who had a matrilineal culture in which women had active and highly valued positions of influence and agency. The final 5-0 approval of the monument by Lexington's governing Select Board was for a compromise location across from the Battle Green on the Visitors Center Lawn. This constituted an overruling of a disapproval vote by Lexington's Monuments and Memorials Committee.

Throughout the process, monument proponents continued to fundraise to support the project. While largely paid for through voluntary contributions, it was conceived as a gift to the Town. Following the unveiling, the monument was turned over to the Town.

== Events ==
In 2025 and 2026, the monument was the backdrop for events highlighting the way women in Lexington have influenced the country's economic, political, intellectual, and cultural lives. The 2026 event featured an all-day "stitch-a-thon" of fiber crafts, and an honoring of living women who have made contributions to the Town. Both events included a reenactment of the spinning protest organized by Abigail Harrington (featured in the monument) on August 31, 1769. On that day, 45 women and girls gathered on the town commons with spinning wheels to make their own yarn and cloth as a way to implement the boycott on imported cloth and to protest the unfairness of British taxes.
