= Statue of Charles Devens =

Statue of Charles Devens may refer to

- Equestrian statue of Charles Devens
- Statue of Charles Devens (Boston)
