= Elizabeth Nichols Dyar =

Elizabeth Nichols Dyar (January 11, 1751 – June 4, 1818) was born in Malden, Middlesex, Massachusetts Bay Colony, British Colonial America. She is honored with the title of Real Daughter by the organization Daughters of the American Revolution for her participation in the Boston Tea Party.

== Family life ==
Elizabeth was raised in Malden, Massachusetts where she married Joseph Dyar II on May 2, 1771. Joseph was born in Boston, Massachusetts Bay Colony, British Colonial America on August 13, 1747. The pair had seven children, all born in Malden, Massachusetts: Joseph Dyar (1772), who died in infancy; Rev. Joseph Dyar Jr (1774–1859); James Dyar (1775–1794); Elizabeth Ann Dyar (1777–1843); John Nichols Dyar (1778–1853); Ebenezer Dyar (1782–1853); and Sally Dyar (1783–1847). In 1802 Elizabeth moved to Maine with her fifth child, John Nichols Dyar. There, she died and was buried on his estate. A slab of white marble with the inscription "My Mother, Mrs Elizabeth Dyar, died June 4, 1818, aged 67. All flesh is as grass." marks her grave.

== Role in the Revolutionary War ==
In 1763 The Dyars lived in a neighborhood in Boston's North End, and were active and respected members of the community. Elizabeth's husband Joseph Dyar was a member of the revolutionary organization Sons of Liberty, a group whose goal was to advance the rights of the European colonists and to fight taxation by the British government. The turning point that got Elizabeth involved in the fight against the British was the Tea Act. Like most women of her time Dyar was an active tea drinker who stated tea is "the cup that cheers but not inebriates." For Elizabeth the Tea Act was the final push, she joined her husband in the protest against the British Government.

On December 16, 1773, Joseph Dyar and other members of Sons of Liberty gathered in the kitchen of the Dyars home where the 22 year old Elizabeth and two other Daughters of Liberty prepared and applied stains and paint to the faces and bodies of the men to transform them into Mohawk Indians. After the men boarded ships in Boston Harbor and destroyed an entire shipment of tea sent by the East India Company.

Before Joseph left on that fateful night, Elizabeth had one request: that he bring her a handful of tea. When he returned home he produced the handful of tea and dashed it into the fire. He raged that not even she would partake of the tea."

Following the Boston Tea Party, the British occupied the city of Boston. Friends and family members of the Dyars feared for their safety during this time, since they believed that if their involvement in the Tea Party was found out, their lives could be endangered. So in order to protect her children, Elizabeth with the help of friends was able to smuggle herself and her children across British lines in a butcher cart, to safety to stay at her childhood home in Malden, Massachusetts.

While Elizabeth focused on taking care of her family during the following years leading up to and during the war, Joseph engaged in the war by smuggling supplies for the American Army across the colonies. Joseph was captured a total nine times by the British during the course of the war. The last time being stripped, flogged, and deprived of food for three days. In his weakened condition he died in 1783 from the effects of his capture. His body was returned to his family and buried in Malden.

== After the Revolution ==
Following the end of war and the death of her husband, Elizabeth moved to Maine (which was a territory of Massachusetts at the time) with her son John, his wife, and family. John bought 600 acre tract of land in Freeman, ME. Where he built a large colonial mansion sized home, called "Prospect Farm". At the Farm Elizabeth lived out the rest of her life till her death on June 4, 1818.

== Remembrance ==
Her role in helping to boycott the Tea Act has made her a popular figure in the women's organization the Daughters of the American Revolution. In which several chapters around the country are named after Dyar. In the September 1923 the Colonel Asa Whitcomb Chapter of the DAR in Kingfield, Maine, made a formal memorial in her honor. The Tablet reads on her memorial:

TO COMMEMORATE THE PATRIOTISM OF

ELIZABETH NICHOLS DYAR

ONE OF THREE YOUNG WOMEN
WHO MIXED AND APPLIED THE PAINT
TO DISGUISE AS INDIANS
THE MEN OF THE BOSTON TEA PARTY
DECEMBER 16, 1773
WITH HER CHILDREN SHE WAS SMUGGLED
THROUGH THE LINES TO MALDEN
PASSED LATTER PART OF LIFE HERE
WITH YOUNGEST SON, JOHN NICHOLS DYAR
ON PROSPECT FARM
AND WAS BURIED ON THIS SPOT.

ALSO HER HUSBAND

JOSEPH DYAR

WHO WAS NINE TIMES CAPTURED BY THE BRITISH
WHILE CAPTAIN OF BOAT
CARRYING SUPPLIES TO AMERICAN ARMY
DIED FROM EFFECT OF ILL TREATMENT IN 1783
AND WAS BURIED IN MALDEN, MASS.

THIS GRAVE RESTORED BY THEIR DESCENDANTS,
TOWN OF FREEMAN,
AND COLONEL ASA WHITCOMB CHAPTER
OF KINGFIELD, SEPTEMBER 1923.

TABLET PLACED BY THE MAINE STATE COUNCIL
DAUGHTERS OF THE AMERICAN REVOLUTION
JULY 1924.
