= Statue of Domingo Faustino Sarmiento =

Statue in Boston, Massachusetts, U.S.

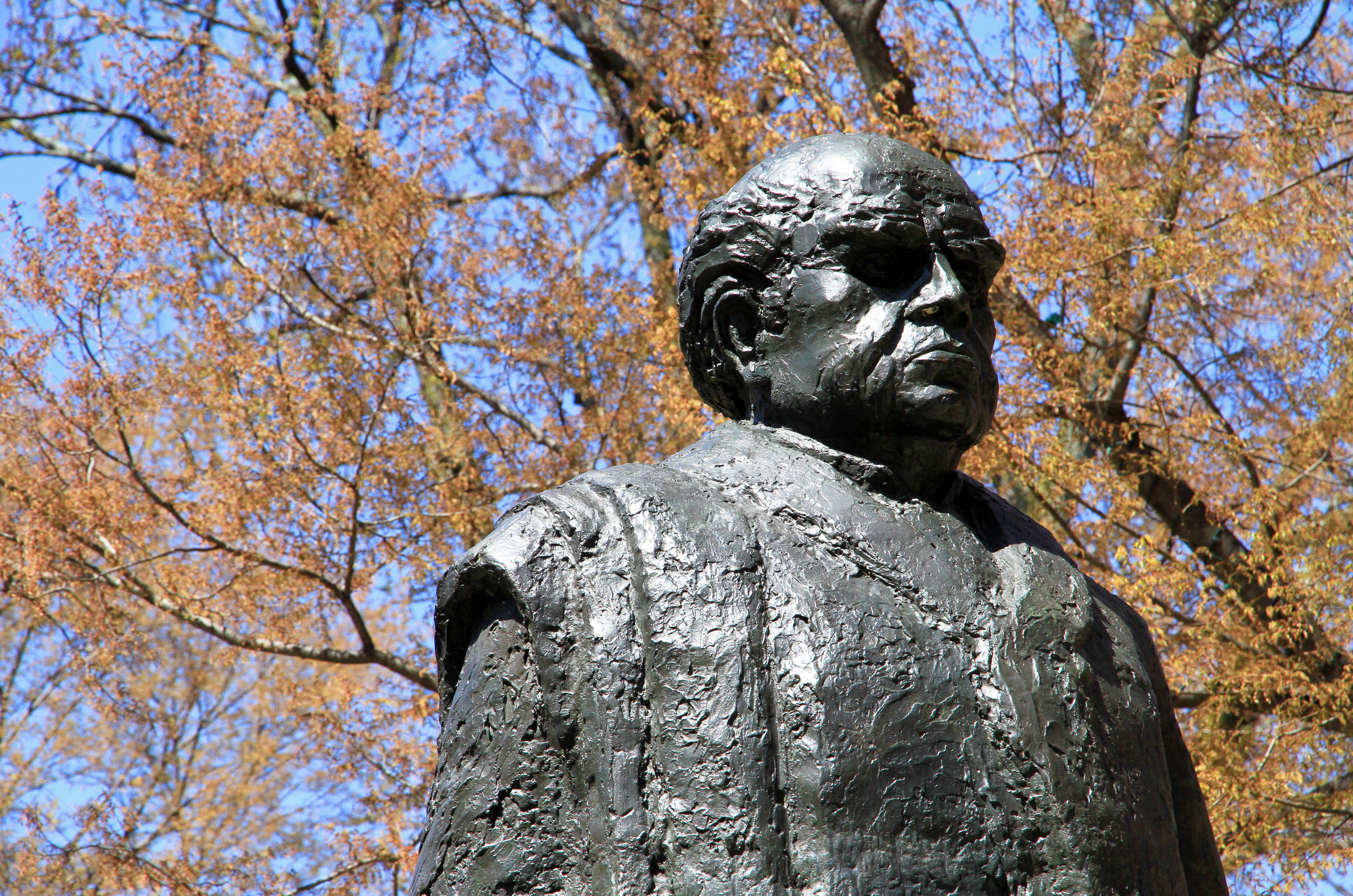
- Part of the statue in 2013
- Artist: Ivette Compagnion
- Medium: Bronze sculpture
- Subject: Domingo Faustino Sarmiento
- Location: Boston, Massachusetts, U.S.; 42°21′0″N 71°5′6.7″W

A statue of Domingo Faustino Sarmiento by Ivette Compagnion is installed along Boston's Commonwealth Avenue Mall, in the U.S. state of Massachusetts.

== Description and history ==
The bronze sculpture measures approximately 10 ft. x 4 ft. 1 in. x 3 ft. 3 in., and rests on a cement base that measures approximately ft. 2 in. x 4 ft. 7 in. x 4 ft. 7 in. It was dedicated in May 1973. The work was surveyed by the Smithsonian Institution's "Save Outdoor Sculpture!" program in 1993.
