= Commonwealth Avenue Historic District (Newton, Massachusetts) =

Historic district in Massachusetts, United States

- U.S. National Register of Historic Places
- U.S. Historic district
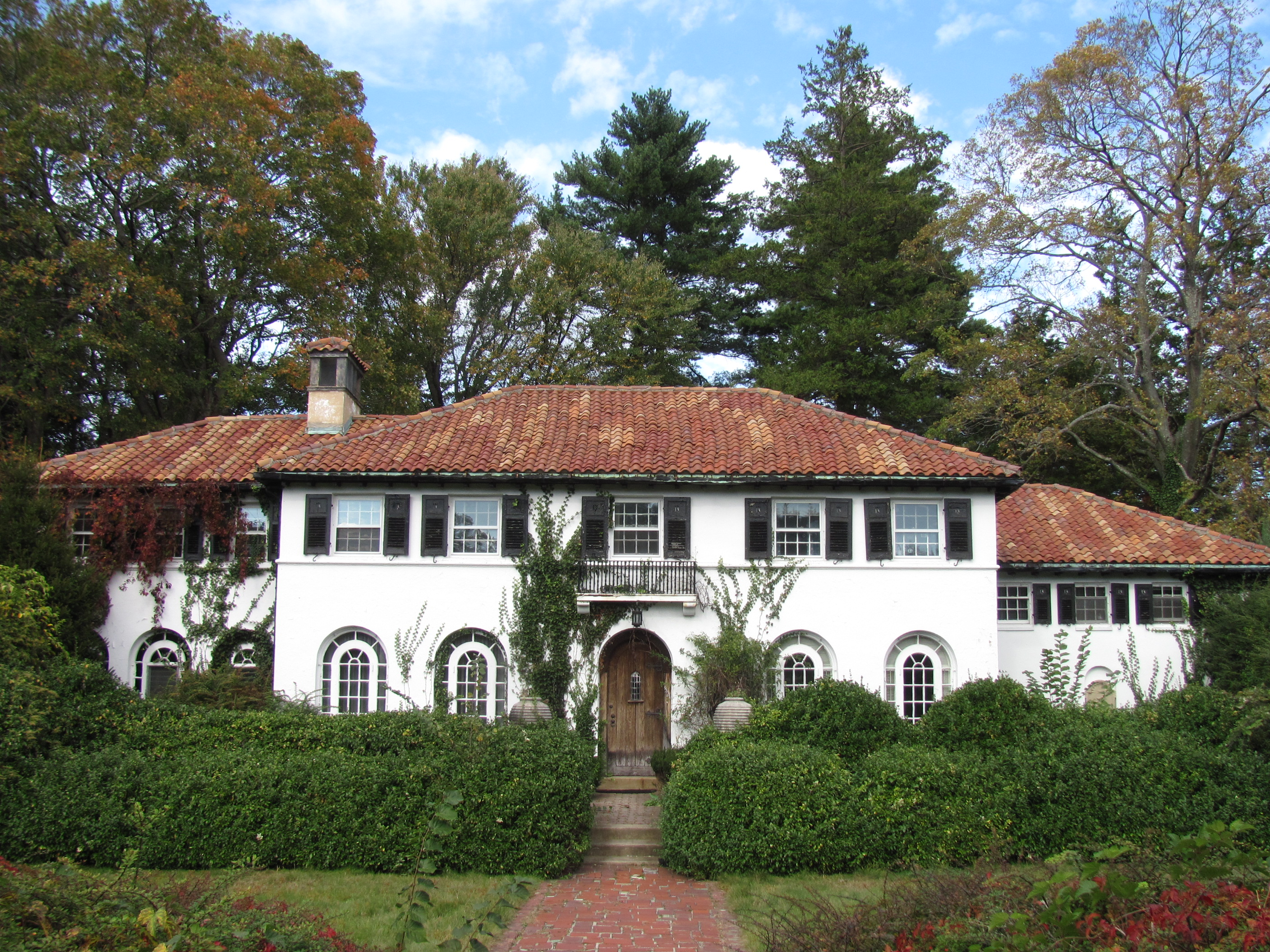
- Corner of Commonwealth Avenue and Hammond Street

- Location within Massachusetts Location within the United States
- Location: Roughly Commonwealth Ave. from Walnut St. to Waban Hill Rd., Newton, Massachusetts
- Coordinates: 42°20′17″N 71°11′24″W
- Area: 55.85 acres (22.60 ha)
- Architect: Multiple
- Architectural style: Late 19th And 20th Century Revivals, Late Victorian
- MPS: Newton MRA
- NRHP reference No.: 90000012
- Added to NRHP: February 16, 1990

The Commonwealth Avenue Historic District of Newton, Massachusetts, encompasses roughly the eastern half of Commonwealth Avenue, extending from Waban Hill Road, near the city line with Boston, westward to Walnut Street. The roadway was laid out in 1894 and completed in 1895. Its design was influenced in part by the local residents, who were willing to give land for some of the route, and the design of Boston portions of the road, in which Frederick Law Olmsted was involved. Construction of the roadway was followed by the construction of fashionably large residences along its route, which took place mostly between the road's construction and about 1920. The district includes 188 residential properties, which are mainly built in the revival styles popular in the early 20th century. The district was added to the National Register of Historic Places in 1990.

== Description and history ==
Commonwealth Avenue in Newton was built in 1895 as an extension of the boulevard of that name that ran through Boston, that would pass through the central part of the city, providing vehicular and street car service to an area not well served by its Circuit Railway. It was modeled to some degree on that road and Beacon Street in Brookline, as a wide right of way with space for a street car line. (The Commonwealth Avenue Street Railway connected with the Boston Elevated Railway streetcars near the Newton-Boston boundary at Boston College). It differs from those roads, in that the terrain is much hillier, requiring the road to wind in a more picturesque manner, and in the city's aversion to multiunit apartment blocks.

A significant number of houses lining Commonwealth Avenue were designed by architects. The most prolific was Harry Morton Ramsay, who is documented to have designed at least 17 of them. Ramsay's work was in a variety of styles, with the Colonial Revival predominating in his work along this road. Most of these houses were built for well-to-do Boston businessmen and professionals. There are two areas along the road where small commercial blocks were built: near the eastern end in the vicinity of Boston College, and at the corner of Centre Street.

== See also ==
- National Register of Historic Places listings in Newton, Massachusetts
