= Spinning bee =

Spinning bees were 18th-century public events where women in the American Colonies produced homespun cloth to help the colonists reduce their dependence on British goods. They emerged in the decade prior to the American Revolution as a way for women to protest British policies and taxation.

== Historical background ==
Great Britain enforced the 1765 Stamp Act on its American colonies, which taxed official documents throughout the colony. The British Crown viewed these measures as a legitimate way to raise revenue. In contrast, many colonists viewed these acts as tyrannical, arguing that taxation without consent violated their rights as Englishmen. One common way that colonists protested this act of Parliament was through non-importation agreements and boycotts. Though the Stamp Act 1765 was repealed in 1766, the following year Parliament passed the Townshend Acts, imposing a new tax on goods such as glass and paper. Non-importation movements and boycotts resumed in protest of these additional taxes. Spinning bees were among these acts of defiance of the Townshend Acts by encouraging local production of cloth instead of purchasing imported English textiles that bore the new tax.

== Political significance ==
The homespun cloth and garments that these spinning bees produced became a political symbol as well as a material boycott. Wearing homespun showed other colonists that the wearer was protesting the British by refusing to buy British clothes. In addition to average colonists, prominent colonial leaders and politicians also donned homespun clothing as a show of rebellion against the British Crown. One year prior to the outbreak of the Revolution, the entirety of Harvard's graduating class wore homespun garments.

Spinning bees also held a personal importance for women as well, involving women in the resistance to Great Britain where previously they had been excluded from public displays of resistance against the Crown.

== Process of spinning bees ==
The spinning bees sponsored by Rebel groups such as the Daughters of Liberty represented one way that colonial women could get involved in the protest of imperial policies. The colonies relied on Great Britain for textiles, meaning that a successful boycott would require alternate sources for many goods that colonists imported. The task of enacting the boycott fell to women, providing them an opportunity to enter the public side of the protest alongside men against the British Crown. Women began to compete publicly against one another to see who could make the most homemade cloth, known as homespun. These contest became known as spinning bees.

The Sons of Liberty often co-hosted these events with the Daughters of Liberty as a way to publicly support the Patriot cause against the British. Like other local festivities of the time, spinning bees included songs, picnics, and friendly competitions. Newspaper accounts, for example those from Rhode Island, also demonstrate that spinning bees attempted to use the spirit of competition to bridge the gap between married and unmarried women as well as lower- and upper-class women. The spinning bees would often be community events, taking place in the center of town or in the town minister's home, depending upon the class status of the women involved. It was more likely for poorer women to spin as part of a bigger festivity than upper-class women, who spun at their minister's house.

== Lexington, Massachusetts spinning protest and its modern-day re-enactments ==
Lexington, Massachusetts was the location for a spinning protest held on August 31, 1769 organized by Abigail Harrington who lived across from the town common. On that day, she and 44 other women and girls gathered with spinning wheels to make their own yarn and cloth as a way to demonstrate their intention to boycott imported cloth. A few years later this same town commons was the site of the first shots fired in the American Revolutionary War as part of the Battles of Lexington and Concord.

In 2025 and 2026 there have been re-enactments of the spinning protest held in a nearby location in front of the Lexington Women's Liberty Monument. This monument, which was installed in 2024, features a representation of Harrington along with other Lexington women who have influenced Americans' economic, political, intellectual, and cultural lives.

== Legacy ==
Spinning bees were a predecessor to women's paid work outside the home. Since the spinning bees required women to spin and weave out in public, they presented an opportunity for women to participate in the colonial economy in a public setting. The ability for women to spin as well as weave in public paved the way for women's eventual role in the United States factory system. Factory work became one of the few occupations open to women in the 19th century.

== In other countries ==
Before the advent of electric lighting in Europe, rural and urban women in Germany would gather to do their spinning and other handicrafts in a single house or room in order to preserve firewood, candles, and lantern oil, thus collectively saving supplies for heating and lighting. This was variably referred to depending on the dialect as a Spinnstube (lit. 'spinning room'), Lichtstube (light room), or Rockenstube (distaff room), among other terms. While the spinning rooms were nominally segregated by gender, it was common for young men to visit the spinning rooms to accompany young women home in the evenings. As such, it was one of the few places that a relationship could be started away from the watchful eyes of church authorities and family members. From the 16th century onwards, this practice later drew outrage from Catholics and Protestants alike due to accusations of sexual debauchery. In response, a Lichtherrn ('light man') could be assigned to a spinning room to hold the members responsible to spiritual authorities. Ernest Borneman mentions the following obscene terms from spinning room jargon:

- Brechelbraut ('naughty bride'), Flachskönigin (flax queen), Handelsbraut (commercial bride), Raufbraut (rough bride): The prettiest girl was chosen to be the "naughty bride" at the time of the flax breaking.
- Brechelbusch (shaggy bush): A distaff coated in flax. The Brechelbusch resembled a fir tree decorated with ribbons, which a girl threw under the boys so that they could fight for it: Whoever conquered it won the favor of the Brechelbraut.
- Farkel: On the back of her smock, the Brechelbraut wore a flax wreath, which the boys tried to soak with a bucket of water to get the girl to hang up her skirt and petticoats to dry.
- Agenschoppen: The flax waste (Agen) was stuffed into the boys' waistbands by the girls, which served as a playful excuse to quickly grope the male genitals.
- Fleischhaufen (meat pile): After dancing, all participants dropped to the floor, creating the largest possible crowd, in which there was an opportunity for mutual contact. This custom was particularly offensive and was condemned in numerous sermons.
- flachsbrecheln (flax break): "tell nonsense, make stupid jokes".
- haardörren (hair drying): drying flax or coitus.
- Brechelkinder: Children born in autumn who may have been conceived in the spinning room during flax crumbling in the previous winter months.
