= Daughters of Liberty =

Dissident organization during the American Revolution

The Daughters of Liberty was known as the formal female association that was formed in 1765 to protest the Stamp Act, and later the Townshend Acts; it was a general term for women who identified themselves as fighting for liberty during the American Revolution. “Daughters of Liberty” could also be used colloquially to refer to women, any women who partook in revolutionary actions during the American Revolution. Those actions included but were not limited to boycotts, economic ventures, combat, or espionage.

== Activities ==
The main task of the Daughters of Liberty was to protest the Stamp Act and Townshend Acts through aiding the Sons of Liberty in boycotts and support movements prior to the outbreak of the Revolutionary War. The Daughters of Liberty participated in spinning bees, helping to produce homespun cloth for colonists to wear instead of British textiles. Women were also used as the enforcers of these movements because they were the ones responsible for purchasing goods for their households. They saw it as their duty to make sure that fellow Patriots were staying true to their word about boycotting British goods. Women formed “Associations,” a document in which they would agree and sign, promising not to use boycotted British goods. In some states, like South Carolina, women made announcements in newspapers informing the public that they would try to get the support of the boycott from the mistress of every house.

The Daughters of Liberty are also well known for their boycott of British tea after the Tea Act was passed and the British East India Company was given a virtual monopoly on colonial tea. They began drinking what was later known as "liberty tea." Leaves from raspberries or New Jersey tea (Ceanothus americanus) were commonly used as tea substitutes so people could still enjoy tea while refusing to buy goods imported through Britain.

Chapters of the Daughters of Liberty throughout the colonies participated in the war effort by melting down metal for bullets and helping to sew soldiers’ uniforms. The famed leader of the Sons of Liberty, Samuel Adams, is reported as saying, "With ladies on our side, we can make every Tory tremble."

=== In Combat ===
Though they may not have been formal members of Daughters of Liberty, women who fought for the United States during the War for Independence can be considered “Daughters of Liberty.” Women such as Margaret Corbin and Anna Maria Lane enlisted under their own names and fought alongside their husbands in battle. They would wear men’s uniforms but made no effort to hide their sex. Corbin was wounded in battle and later interred at West Point, and Lane would receive a pension from the state of Virginia for her service during the war.

Some women, like Deborah Sampson Gannett, enlisted under men’s names and hid their sex and gender. However, some would be discovered after being wounded in combat.

Women on the front lines would provide water for soldiers and cool the guns. The “Molly Pitcher” likely originates from the Battle of Monmouth, where Mary Hayes was pressed into service to cool the artillery guns.

Women also served as nurses, chefs, and laundry maids.

=== At Home ===
While some women fought alongside men during the war, many more stayed at home while their husbands or fathers fought. The women who stayed at home were just as vital to the Independence movement as they needed to maintain farms or shops. They took over the finances, farming, and other actions that men would have normally performed.

When the war was over, and their husbands or fathers came back, some of these women were unwilling to transition back into the role of housewife after being the head of the house. Some men would use “Daughter of Liberty” in a derogatory way, in questioning why they weren’t married, or remarried if widowed.

== Women associated with the Daughters of Liberty ==
- Sarah Bradlee Fulton is most known for her role in the 1773 Boston Tea Party. She is credited with coming up with the idea that Tea Party participants should wear Mohawk disguises to avoid detection from British officials. This suggestion earned her the nickname, "Mother of the Tea Party." She was an active member of the Daughters of Liberty throughout the Revolution, and in later years, she helped to coordinate volunteer nurses to assist with the Battle of Bunker Hill.
- Sarah Franklin Bache was a Daughter of Liberty and the daughter of diplomat Benjamin Franklin. Other than her parentage, she is most known for helping to outfit American Soldiers in 1780.
- Martha Washington, wife of George Washington and First Lady of the United States, joined General Washington during long winter encampments where she was instrumental in providing as much as she could for soldiers.
- Esther de Berdt Reed is best known for creating the Patriot organization, The Ladies of Philadelphia in 1778, which was dedicated to raising money for food and clothing for the Continental Army. Even though she was born in London, she became alienated from Britain by the crown's actions toward the colonies and decided to fully support the Patriot cause. She is also the author of "Sentiments of an American Woman," an essay that intended to rouse colonial women to join the fight against the British. She was able to use her marriage to Joseph Reed to help her gain more influence and resources.
- Deborah Sampson later emerged as a symbol for female involvement in the Revolutionary War. Rather than supporting the war effort from the outside, she dressed as a man and fought in the war under the name Robert Shurtlieff. She fought in 1781 and her future husband was eventually awarded a pension for her service in the war, albeit after his death.
- Margaret Corbin enlisted with her husband, John. Both were wounded serving with artillery at Fort Washington in 1776. Margaret would serve until her discharge in 1783 and was later interred at West Point, the first woman interred there.
- Anna Maria Lane enlisted with her husband, John. She was wounded during the Battle of Germantown but recovered and fought through the end of the war. She would later receive a pension from Virginia for her service.
- Mary Hayes was pregnant during the Battle of Monmouth, where she carried water for soldiers and to cool artillery guns. Her story is the inspiration for the “Molly Pitcher” folktale.
- Elizabeth Nichols Dyar mixed and applied paint to the men of the Boston Tea Party. She is buried at the Elizabeth Nichols Dyar Memorial in Phillips, Maine, where she lived with her husband Joseph Dyar.

== See also ==
- Liberty Boys
