= Bust of Patrick Collins =

Sculpture in Boston, Massachusetts, U.S.

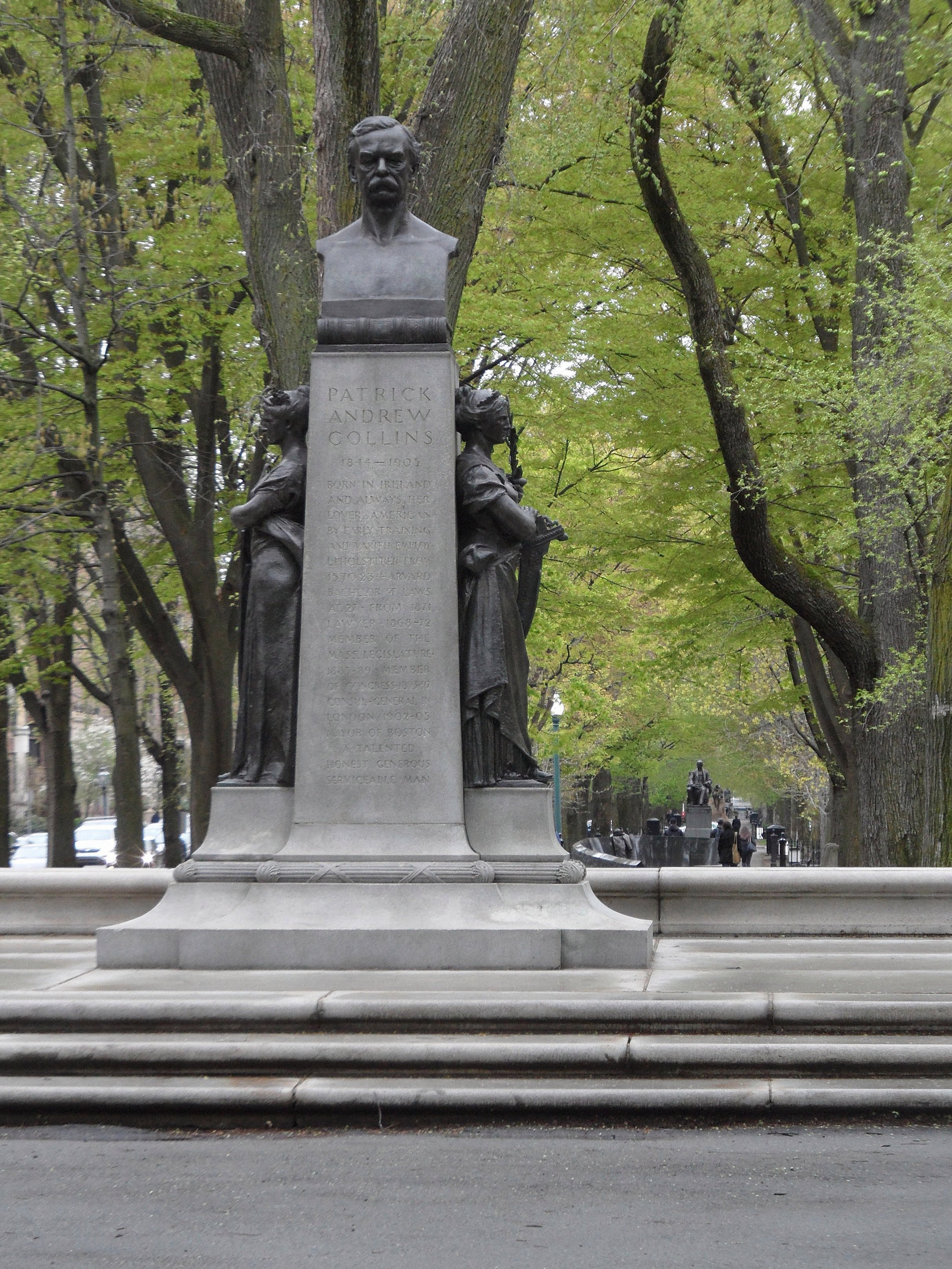
- The memorial in 2019
- Artists: Theo Alice Ruggles Kitson, Henry Hudson Kitson; Roman Bronze Works, foundry
- Medium: Bronze sculpture
- Subject: Patrick Collins
- Location: Boston, Massachusetts, U.S.; 42.352241°N 71.076873°W

A bronze bust of congressman and Boston Mayor Patrick Collins is installed along Boston's Commonwealth Avenue, in the U.S. state of Massachusetts. The memorial was dedicated in 1908 and relocated in 1966. It features a bust of Collins on a granite base flanked by two bronze female statues representing America and Ireland. The figures are approximately 7 ft. 6 in. tall and 2 ft wide, and the base measures approximately 11 ft. 6 in. x 10 ft. 1 in. x 6 ft. 8 in. The work was surveyed by the Smithsonian Institution's "Save Outdoor Sculpture!" program in 1993.
