= Sally Maria Diggs =

Freed American slave (born c. 1851)

Sally Maria Diggs (c.1851 – October 27, 1928) was an enslaved African-American girl, also known as "Pinky", whose freedom was famously bought by Henry Ward Beecher in 1860, during a sermon at Plymouth Church, Brooklyn, NYC. Beecher famously said, "No child should be in slavery, let alone a child like this" and raised $900 to purchase her freedom.

A parishioner named Rose Terry donated a ring toward Diggs' freedom. Upon her emancipation, Diggs was renamed Rose Ward, after Rose Terry and Henry Ward Beecher. The episode was celebrated in a number of paintings and drawings at the time, including Eastman Johnson's "Freedom Ring." Diggs later attended Howard University and married a lawyer named James Hunt, at which point she became Rose Ward Hunt. In 1927, Diggs returned to Plymouth Church to celebrate the 80th anniversary of Henry Ward Beecher's first sermon at Plymouth Church.

In 2010, sculptor Meredith Bergmann crafted a bust of Diggs. It was made in the style of the busts that flank the original entrance of the Center for Brooklyn History (then the Brooklyn Historical Society). The bust remains in CBH's collections.
