= Boston Women's Memorial =

Sculpture in Boston, Massachusetts, U.S.

- Location in Boston
- Artist: Meredith Bergmann
- Year: 2003
- Type: bronze and granite
- Location: Boston, Massachusetts, United States; 42°21′02″N 71°05′00″W

The Boston Women's Memorial is a bronze and granite grouping of three figurative sculptures on the Commonwealth Avenue Mall in Boston, Massachusetts, commemorating Phillis Wheatley, Abigail Adams, and Lucy Stone.

== Overview ==
The idea of a memorial to women was first discussed in 1992 in recognition of the under-representation of women among Boston's statues. A collaboration between the Boston Women's Commission, the Commonwealth Avenue Mall Committee and the Massachusetts Historical Society, supported by Angela Menino, the mayor's wife, developed it over the next twelve years. Three women from Massachusetts history were eventually chosen for their impact on society through their writing.

The design competition was won by New York sculptor Meredith Bergmann. The memorial was unveiled on October 25, 2003, by the mayor of Boston, Thomas Menino. Despite having taken longer than 12 years to be developed and created, the monument was criticized at the time as a quick-fix attempt to address the lack of female representation in Boston's public art, grouping together three historical figures who merit recognition as individuals. "The memorials to men around town don't herd heroes together; neither should a memorial to women," Christine Temin wrote in the Boston Globe.

The statues present the women at street level, rather than on a pedestal, although pedestals are used as part of the artwork to refer to the ways in which women’s liberation has brought women down off their pedestals. Stone, for example, is positioned using her pedestal as an editorial desk, working on the Woman's Journal, which she founded. Quotations from the women are inscribed on their plinths.

The monument has proved to be popular. Local people regularly leave items at or on the statues — scarves around the figure's necks in winter, a Boston Red Sox cap on one's head when the team won the World Series in 2004. Notes of apology were tucked into the statues’ hands after the 2016 election.

For the 20th anniversary, recordings of Congresswoman Ayanna Presley reading Wheately, Attorney General Andrea Campbell reading Adams, and Mayor Michelle Wu reading Lucy Stone were added to the memorial via QR code as part of the Talking Statues program.

The memorial is featured on the Ladies Walk of the Boston Women's Heritage Trail. Bergmann was later selected as the artist for the Lexington Women's Liberty Monument in Lexington, Massachusetts, which was unveiled in 2024.
