= Meredith Bergmann =

American sculptor, poet, and essayist

- Born: 1955
- Occupation: Sculptor
- Notable work: Boston Women's Memorial, Women's Rights Pioneers Monument
- Spouse: Michael Bergmann
- Website: meredithbergmann.com

Meredith Bergmann is an American sculptor, poet, and essayist whose work is said to "forge enriching links between the past and the concerns of the present."

== Education and career ==
Bergmann's bust of Ruth Bader Ginsburg (2020 cast of 2013 original), National Portrait Gallery, Washington, D.C.

She studied at Wesleyan University and graduated from The Cooper Union with a BFA. While at Cooper Union she discovered sculpture and then traveled around Europe and studied in Pietrasanta, Italy. Her memorial to Countee Cullen is in the collection of the New York Public Library. In 2003, she unveiled the Boston Women's Memorial on Commonwealth Avenue Mall in Boston which includes statues of Phillis Wheatley, Abigail Adams, and Lucy Stone. In 2006, Bergmann's statue of the famous contralto Marian Anderson was unveiled on the campus of Converse College in Spartanburg, South Carolina. In 2010, Bergmann created a sculpture of an enslaved girl named Sally Maria Diggs, or "Pinky," whose freedom was purchased for $900 in 1860. Bergmann also completed a commission commemorating the events of September 11, 2001 for New York City's Cathedral of St. John the Divine entitled Memorial to September 11. In July 2021 the Roosevelt Island Disabled Association unveiled Bergmann's "FDR Hope Memorial" on Roosevelt Island, New York City. In 2023 New York Governor Kathy Hochul unveiled a bas relief portrait of Ruth Bader Ginsburg by Bergmann for the “Million Dollar Staircase” in the State House in Albany, NY. In August 2024, Bergmann unveiled her statue of Lucy J. Brown in Ithaca, New York. Bergmann serves on the advisory board of The New Historia and is an Honorary Vice President of the National Association of Women Artists.

=== Women's Rights Pioneers Monument ===
On August 26, 2020, the 100th anniversary of the ratification of the Nineteenth Amendment to the United States Constitution granting women the right to vote, her Women's Rights Pioneers Monument was dedicated in Central Park, New York City. Commissioned by Monumental Women, it portrays and honors suffragists Sojourner Truth, Susan B. Anthony, and Elizabeth Cady Stanton. It is Central Park's first statue depicting historical, and not fictional, female figures. The foundry responsible in delivering the work is UAP (formerly named Polich Tallix.)

=== The Lexington Women's Liberty Monument ===
Bergmann worked with the non-profit LexSeeHer to design a monument in Lexington, Massachusetts that would reflect the cultural and historical contributions of Lexington women from the colonial era through to the twenty-first century. it was unveiled in the town's historic center in May, 2024. The Lexington Women's Liberty Monument is subtitled "Something is Being Done!" to mirror the call made by Abigail Harrington to rouse the local militia on April 19, 1775 before the first battle of the Revolutionary War.

=== Poetry and writing ===
Meredith Bergman is a longtime member of the Powwow River Poets. Her poetry has been published in Contemporary Poetry Review and Light Poetry Magazine, among others. Her chapbook A Special Education was published in 2014 by EXOT Books.

=== Film ===
Meredith has been Production Designer on five independent feature films and several shorts, working with her husband, Michael Bergmann.

== Awards ==
- Forbes 50 Over 50, 2021
- Herbert Adams Memorial Award for the Advancement of Sculpture, 2021
- August St. Gaudens Award for Artistic Achievement, 2019
