= Olin Levi Warner =

American sculptor (1844–1896)

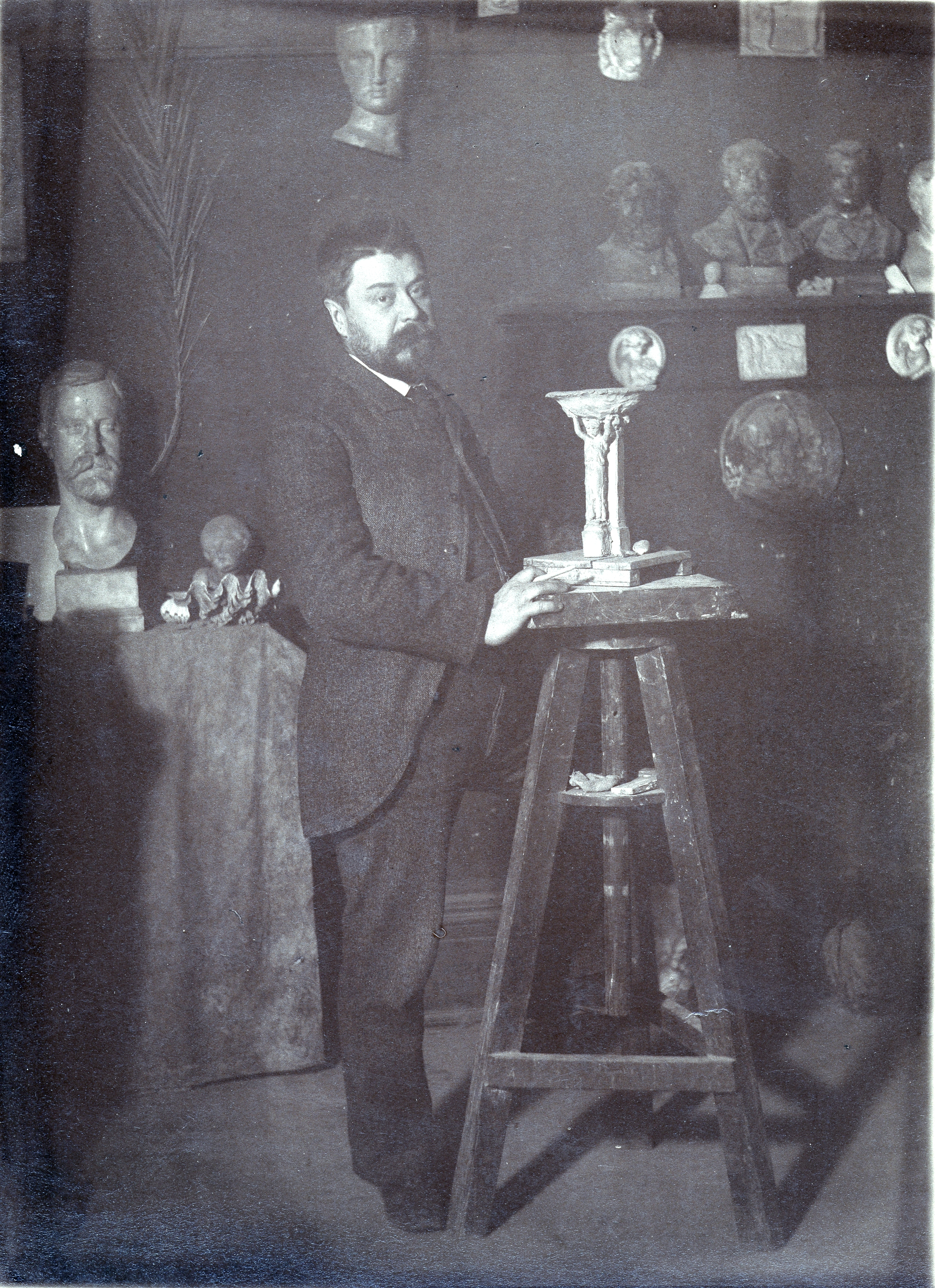
- Warner in 1874
- Born: April 9, 1844; Suffield, Connecticut, U.S.
- Died: August 14, 1896 (aged 52); New York City, New York, U.S.
- Known for: Bas relief, sculpture

Olin Levi Warner (April 9, 1844 – August 14, 1896) was an American sculptor and artist noted for the striking bas relief portrait medallions and busts he created in the late 19th century.

== Early life ==
Warner was born in Suffield, Connecticut. Warner's great-great-uncle was the Revolutionary leader Seth Warner.

== Career ==
As a young man he worked as an artisan and a telegraph operator. In 1869, he had saved up enough money to move to Paris, where he studied sculpture at the École nationale supérieure des Beaux-Arts under François Jouffroy, and worked as an assistant to Jean-Baptiste Carpeaux.

When the French Third Republic was proclaimed in 1870, he enlisted in the Foreign Legion, resuming his studies when the siege was over (May 1871).

In 1872, he moved to New York City and established a studio. He was one of the founders and a member of the Society of American Artists in 1877, and an associate of the National Academy of Design in 1888.

A trip through the Northwest Territory led to a series of Native American-themed portrait medallions. He designed the souvenir half-dollar for the Columbian Exposition, held in Chicago in 1893.

After meeting with little commercial success, however, he returned to live at his father's farm in Vermont, where he also did work for manufacturers of silver and plated ware. Towards the end of his life his sculptures became known to a wider audience.

== Death ==
He died in 1896, after a cycling accident in Central Park in New York City. In the 1970s, Warner's heirs donated his collection of personal papers to the Smithsonian Institution's Archives of American Art.

Warner is credited with popularizing the bas relief, through numerous portraits in this style. Among his best known works are:

- May (1872)
- "Edwin Forrest" (medallion, 1876)
- Rutherford B. Hayes (bust, 1876)
- Twilight (1878)
- Dancing Nymph (1879)
- Eight portrait busts on the facade of the Brooklyn Historical Society including Michelangelo, Beethoven, Columbus, Franklin, Gutenberg, Shakespeare, a Norseman, and a Native American. (1881)
- "Gov. William Alfred Buckingham" (statue, 1883)
- Statue of William Lloyd Garrison (1885)
- "The Reverend William F. Morgan, D. D." (bust, 1887)
- Skidmore Fountain for Portland, Oregon (1888)
- Diana (1888)
- Major General Charles Devens (statue, 1892–1896)
- In 1895, he was commissioned to create three bronze portals (tympanum and pair of doors) for the Library of Congress. The three tympanums and one door had been completed when he died, and Herbert Adams finished the rest of the commission.
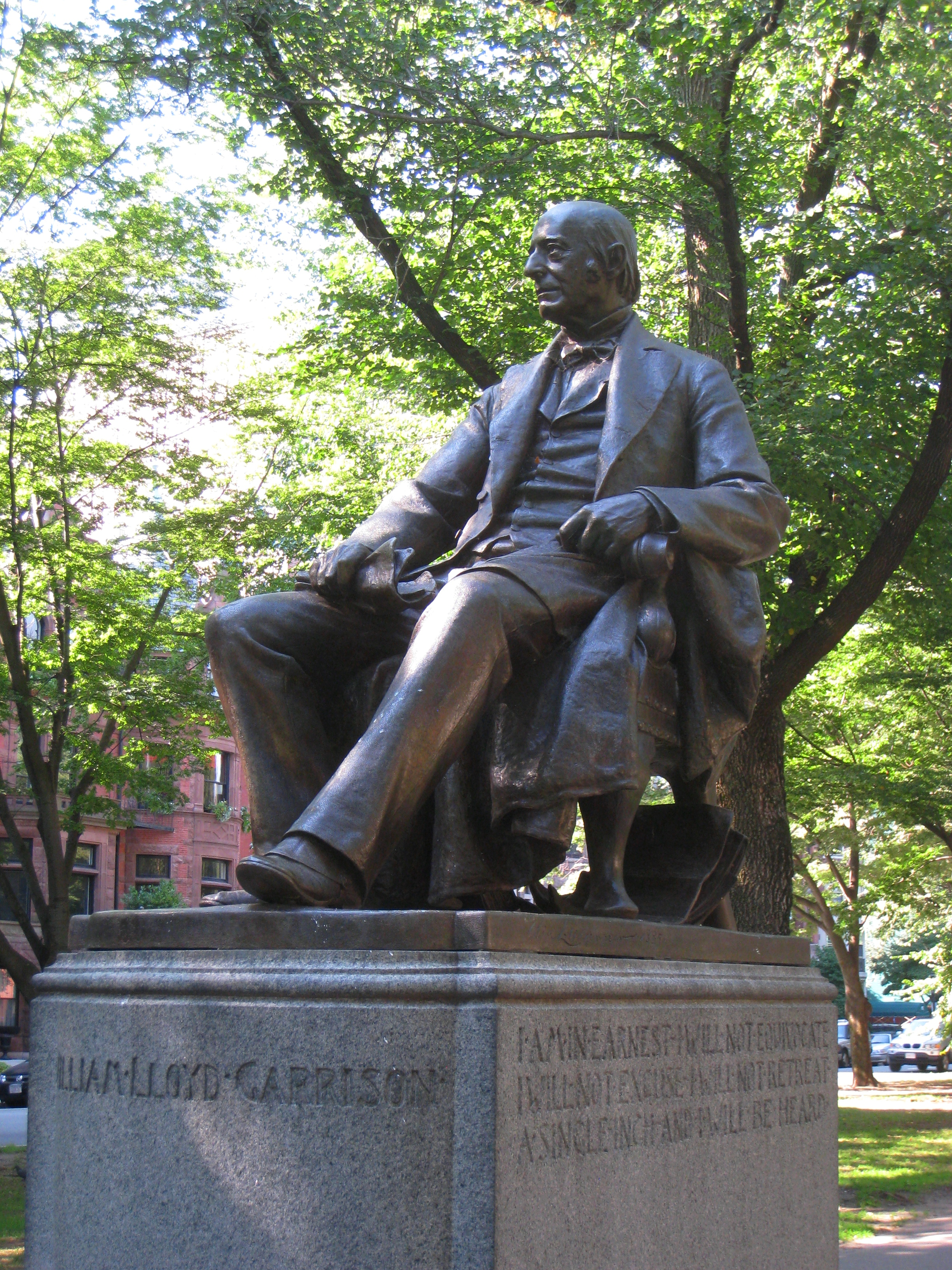
William Lloyd Garrison (1885), on Boston Common.

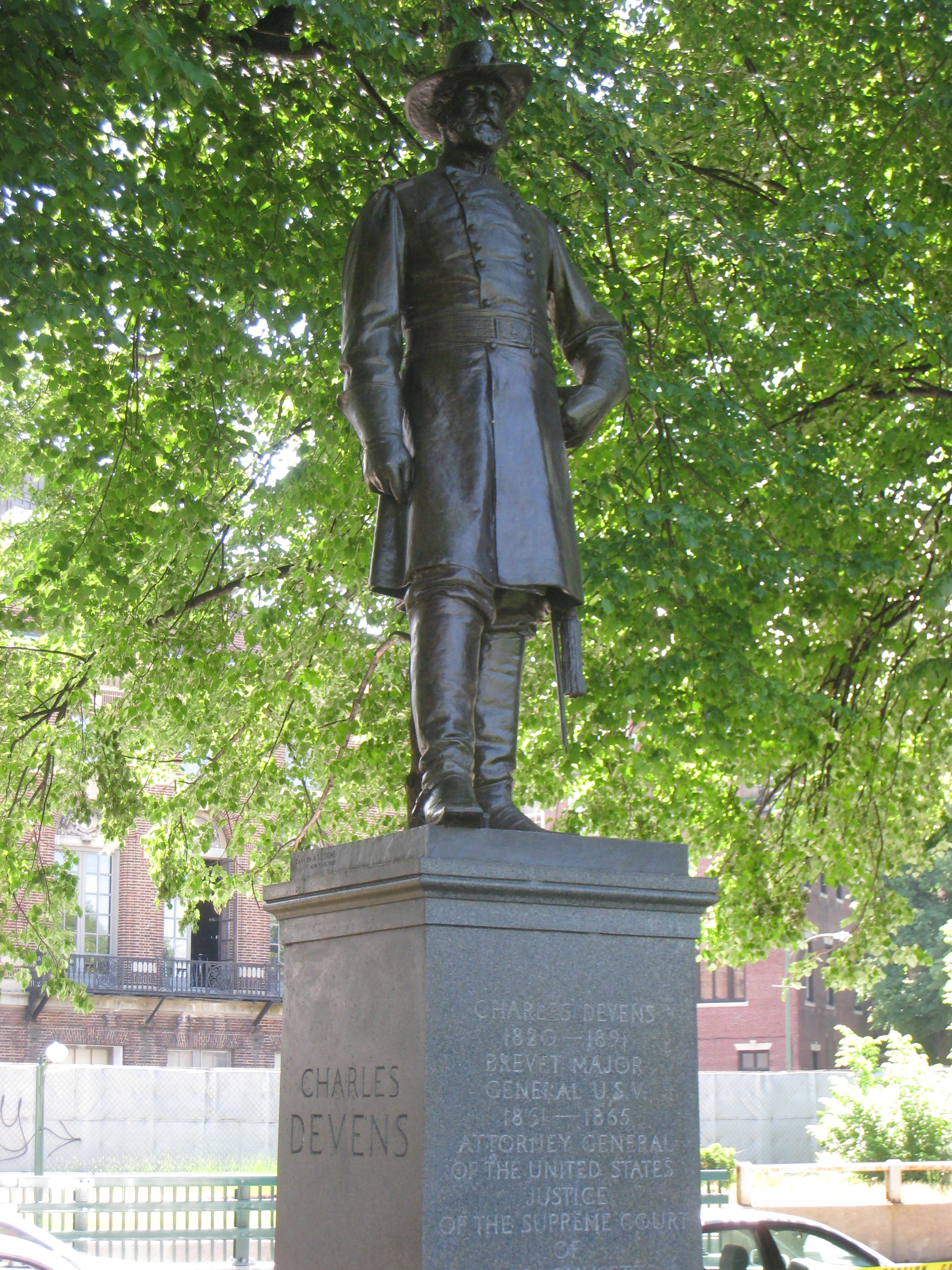
Major General Devens (1892–1896), Boston, MA.

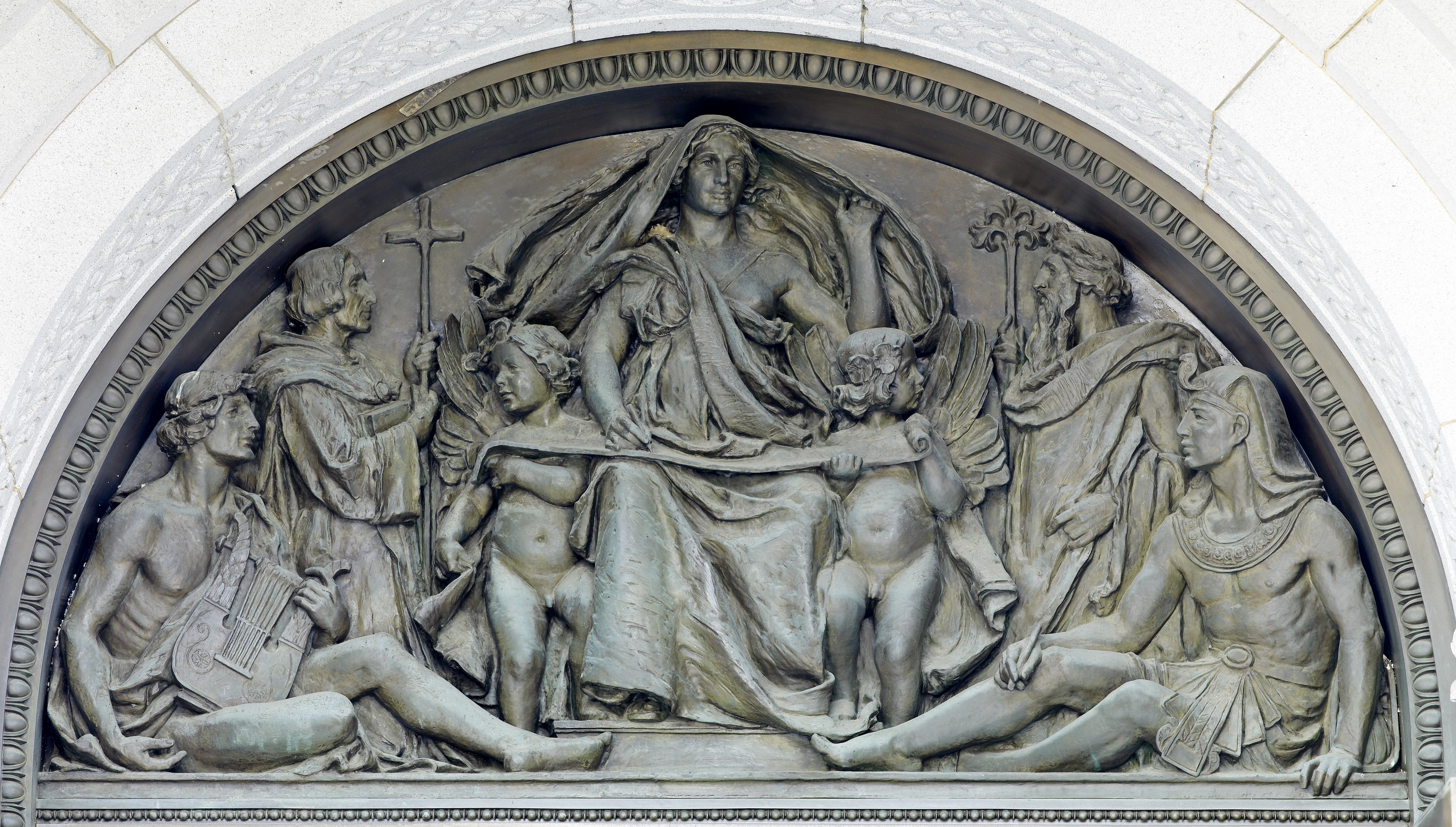
Writing (1896). Bronze tympanum above exterior of main entrance doors, Library of Congress Thomas Jefferson Building, Washington, DC.

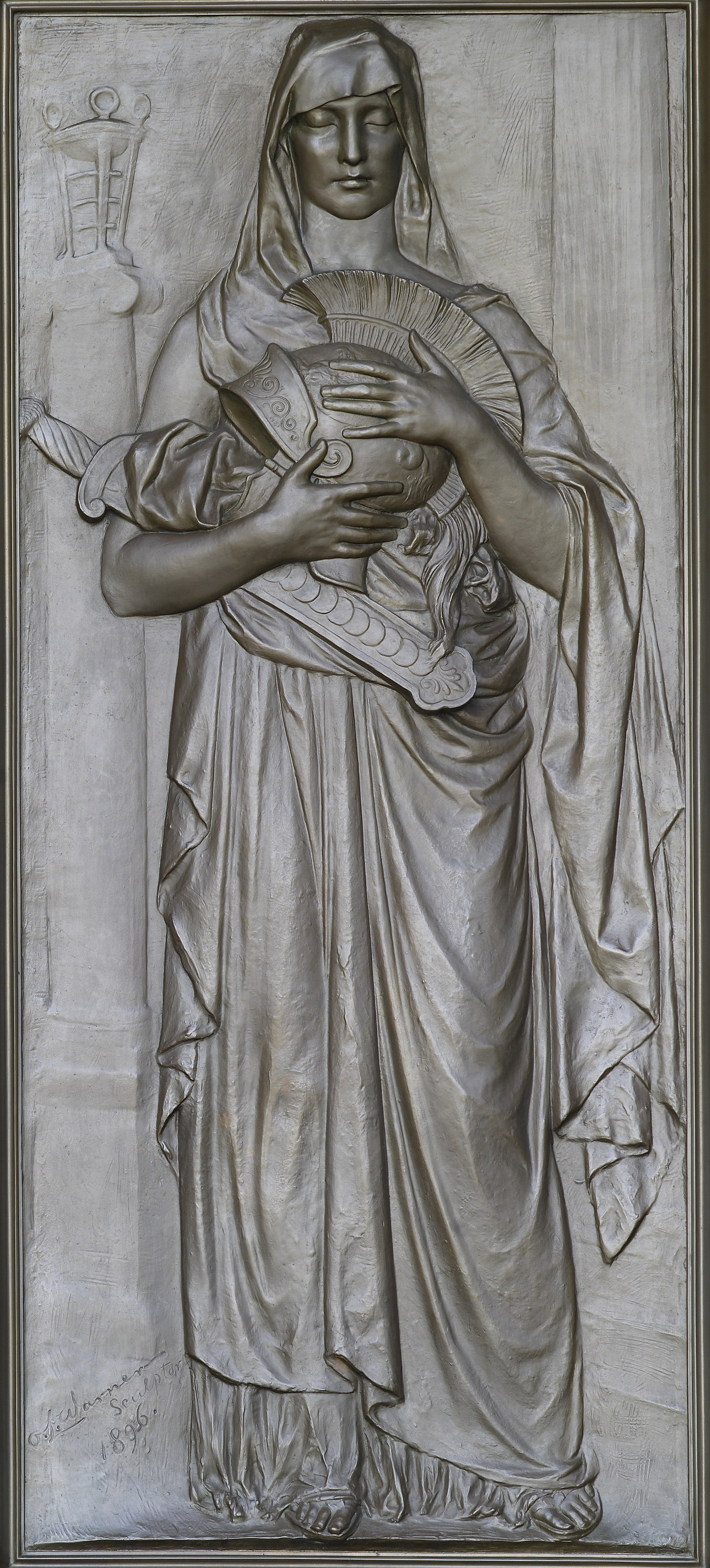
Memory (1896). Library of Congress Thomas Jefferson Building, Washington, D.C.
