= Statue of William Lloyd Garrison =

Statue by Olin Levi Warner in Boston, Massachusetts, USA

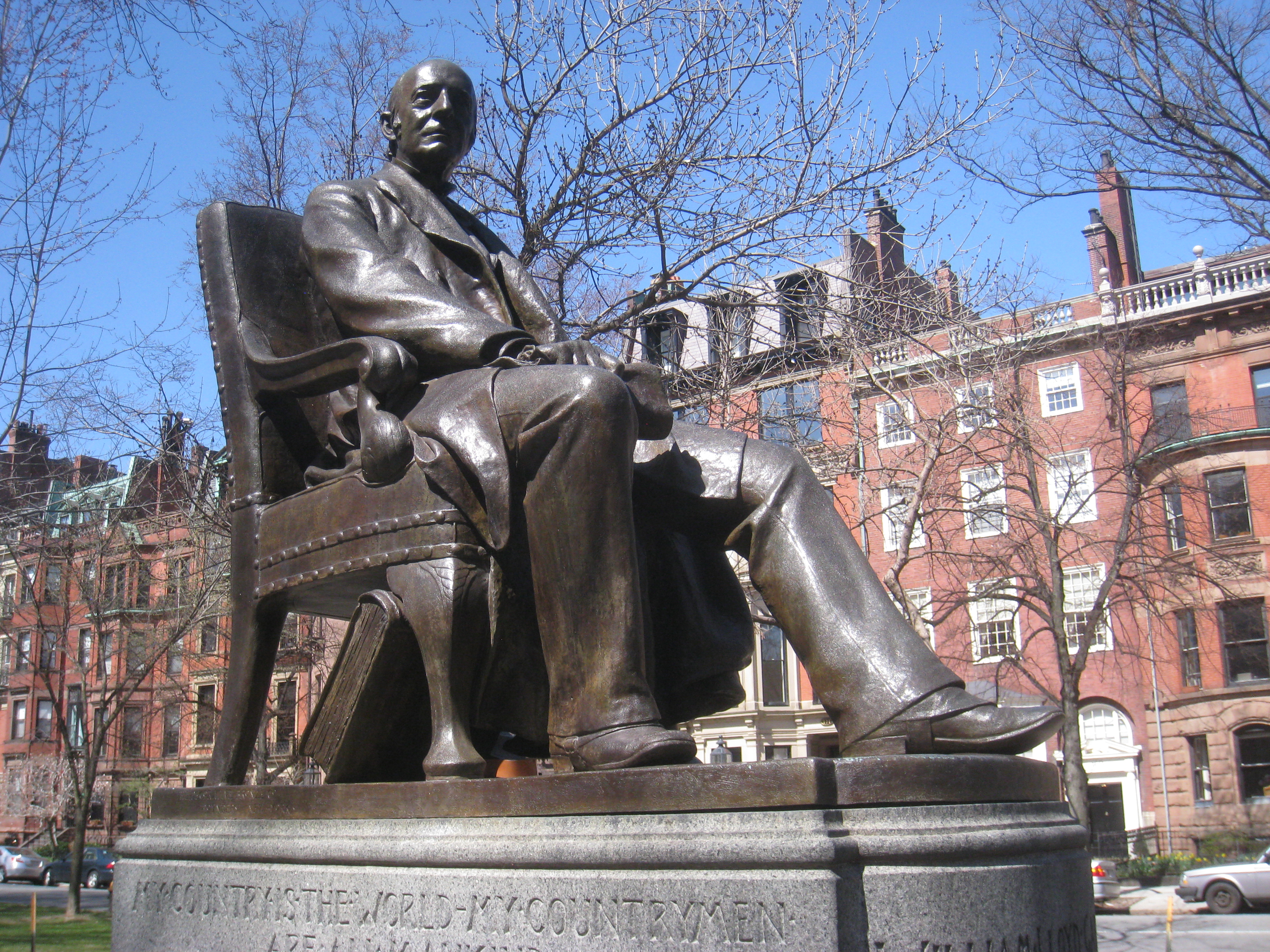
- The statue in 2010
- Artist: Olin Levi Warner
- Medium: Bronze sculpture
- Subject: William Lloyd Garrison
- Location: Boston, Massachusetts, U.S.; 42°21′5.9″N 71°4′44.7″W

A statue of William Lloyd Garrison by Olin Levi Warner is installed along Commonwealth Avenue, in Boston, Massachusetts, United States. It was designed in 1885, cast in 1886, installed on May 13 of that year. The bronze sculpture measures approximately 7 ft. x 4 ft. x 6 ft. 4 in., and rests on a Quincy granite pedestal designed by architect Joseph Morrill Wells that measures approximately 4 ft. 9 in. x 4 ft. x 6 ft. 4 in. The memorial was surveyed as part of the Smithsonian Institution's "Save Outdoor Sculpture!" program in 1993.
