= Ada Clapham Govan =

American writer and amateur ornithologist

Ada Clapham Govan (June 16, 1885 – April 11, 1964) was an amateur ornithologist and writer from Lexington, Massachusetts, who became an astute observer of the birds in her own backyard. She was federally licensed in bird banding, wrote popular columns and poems about her observations in The Boston Globe and was the author of a well-received book of her experiences. Govan is among the women represented in the Lexington Women's Liberty Monument.

== Personal circumstances ==
A combination of misfortunes resulted in Govan considering herself to be "a useless shut-in." These were the loss of two of her four children in their infancy, a hip injury and arthritis in her hip and spine. In this state of pain and sadness, she worrried that she would burden the lives of the people she loved most. It was in a blizzard in 1925 that she first noticed a chickadee outside her window. Inspired by what she saw as the bravery of the bird and still in agony from her ailments, she managed to bring a handful of crumbs to the door which were promptly eaten. Feeding and watching the birds from her window became a new routine. She enlisted her son to develop trays for food initially from cigar boxes and pans for water. More birds of more species kept arriving and her fascination with observing them helped to pull her from her difficult physical and emotional state.

== Writing ==
Govan was a 40-year contributor to The Boston Globe, writing first in 1932 for a column called "Birds I Know." As part of a Globe feature called the "Confidential Chatter" she wrote under the pen name "Of Thee I Sing." As described in the Audubon Magazine "For years she was too modest to write for money, but Govan faced new realities when her husband lost his bookkeeping job in the Great Depression. Financial strain prompted her to publish pieces in Nature Magazine, the Boston Sunday Herald, and the Christian Science Monitor, where readers looked for nature tales to escape from troubling economic news."

Richard Wilbur Westwood wrote in a foreword to Govan's 1940 book Wings at my Window. that her writing was "sincere, distinctive and infectiously enthusiastic." According to the book that accompanied the 2024 installation of the Lexington Women's Liberty Monument in which Govan is represented, "Her writing explored the mental and emotional health benefits of connecting to nature and wild birdlife".

One bird she wrote about extensively was a very young rose-breasted grosbeak with a broken wing which she ended up taking on as a pet. According to The Boston Globe the bird lived to the age of 17, possibly a record for the species. Govan wrote a tribute to their friendship after the bird's death which she had submitted right before her own death in 1964. In it she writes "Zekie was a deformed, badly injured rose-breasted grosbeak about 25 days old when I picked him up in our Lexington yard on June 20, 1946. Until he was three months old, it was a toss-up whether he would live or not. After that, he never had another sick day." Her writing throughout is sentimental in tone, but full of very detailed observations of the bird's appearance and behavior.

== Bird Banding ==
Govan was federally licensed in bird banding, the practice of placing small tags on the legs of wild birds to aid in studying their movements and life history. She describes her technique and shows examples of the logs she kept of individual birds who were banded and later returned to her backyard in Wings at My Window.

== The Ada Govan Bird Sanctuary ==
Govan donated 12 acres of her backyard in Lexington, Massachusetts to be preserved as a bird sanctuary in 1937. The Ada Govan Bird Sanctuary has been described as a "small yet diverse natural area in Lexington that provides a refuge for numerous bird species and other wildlife."
