= Commonwealth Avenue (Boston) =

Street in Greater Boston, Massachusetts

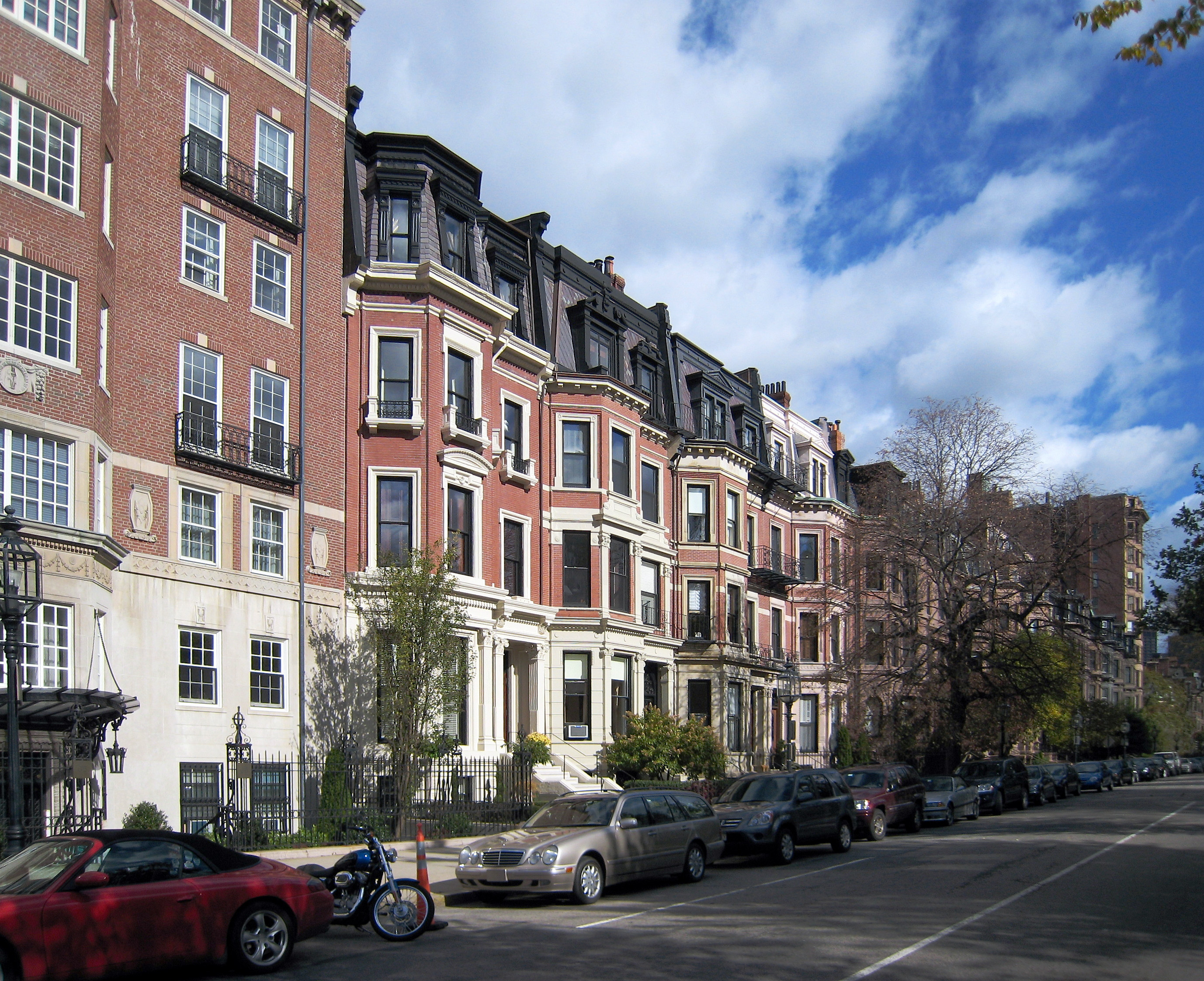
- Commonwealth Avenue in 2006
- Interactive map of Commonwealth Avenue
- Length: 11.0 mi (17.7 km)
- West end: Route 30 in Auburndale
- Major junctions: Route 16 in West Newton; US 20 in Allston
- To: Arlington Street in Back Bay
- North: Marlborough Street (Back Bay)
- South: Newbury Street (Back Bay)

Boston Landmark
- Designated: April 25, 1977 (Commonwealth Avenue Mall)

Commonwealth Avenue (colloquially referred to as Comm Ave) is a major street in the cities of Boston and Newton, Massachusetts. It begins at the western edge of the Boston Public Garden, and continues west through the neighborhoods of the Back Bay, Kenmore Square, Boston University, Allston, Brighton and Chestnut Hill. It continues as part of Route 30 through Newton until it crosses the Charles River at the border of the town of Weston.

== Description ==
Often compared to Georges-Eugène Haussmann's Paris boulevards, Commonwealth Avenue in Back Bay is a parkway divided at center by a wide grassy mall. This greenway, called Commonwealth Avenue Mall, is punctuated with statuary and memorials, and forms the narrowest "link" in the Emerald Necklace. It connects the Public Garden to the Fens.

Where Commonwealth Avenue reaches Kenmore Square, the MBTA Green Line B branch rises above ground and dominates the center of the roadway through the campus of Boston University and the neighborhoods of Allston and Brighton. After leaving Boston and entering Chestnut Hill in Newton, the avenue passes by Boston College and the terminus of the MBTA Green Line B Branch. The trolley in the median is replaced by grass as the scenery becomes noticeably more suburban and residential, and the Commonwealth Avenue Historic District begins. As the road continues out of Chestnut Hill and into Newton Centre, Comm Ave is still made up of two roadways separated by a grassy median lined with trees. The south side of the roadway contains the main, two-lane east-west roadway, with a one-way, westbound "carriage road" providing local access on the north side of the median. The section of Comm Ave from Chestnut Hill Ave in Brighton to Route 16 in Newton is along the Boston Marathon route, and is known to be especially hilly, containing the three “Newton hills”. The carriage road continues into West Newton, and the road passes over the Massachusetts Turnpike in the Auburndale section of Newton. The avenue ends as it leaves Newton, crosses the Charles River and interchanges with Route 128.

The linear 1.5-mile (2.4 km) stretch of Commonwealth Avenue between Kenmore Square and Packard's Corner (where Brighton Avenue maintains a straight continuum and Commonwealth Avenue splits off) contains much of Boston University's campus. BU owns much of the property along and around this part of Commonwealth Avenue.

== History ==
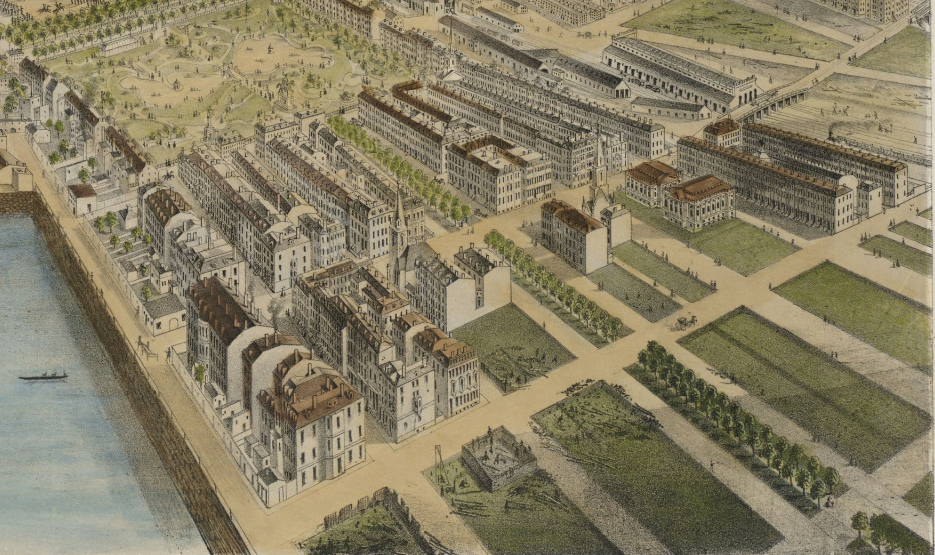
Construction in Back Bay (1870) with the two sides of Commonwealth Avenue flanking the tree-lined Mall.

The Commonwealth Avenue Mall was designed by Arthur Delevan Gilman. Frederick Law Olmsted designed the Newton portion of Commonwealth Avenue and included the parkway as part of the Emerald Necklace park system. The first statue on the Commonwealth Avenue Mall was erected in 1865 at Arlington Street.

The Newton end of the roadway was constructed in 1895 with a line of the Middlesex and Boston Street Railway in the median. In 1923, the stretch of Commonwealth Avenue between Warren Street and Sutherland Road became the first street paved with concrete in Boston. Streetcar service was cut back to its present terminus at the Boston border in 1930 and buses last ran on Commonwealth Avenue in 1976. An amusement park and ballroom known as Norumbega Park was built at the end of the line on the Charles River in 1897 to increase streetcar patronage. The eastern half of the Newton section of the road is listed on the National Register of Historic Places as the Commonwealth Avenue Historic District. The mall that includes the landscape features, monuments, street furniture and fences that are bounded by Kenmore Street, Arlington Street and Commonwealth Avenue was designated as a Boston Landmark by the Boston Landmarks Commission in 1978.

The addition of protected bike lanes between the BU Bridge and Packards Corner in 2020 resulted in a tripling of bikeshare usage along that segment.

== Commonwealth Avenue Mall statues ==
Starting at the Public Garden and going westward, the following statues can be seen on the mall:

- Alexander Hamilton, co-author of The Federalist Papers, sculpted by William Rimmer. The first statue placed on the mall. 1865.
- Statue of John Glover, (depicts John Glover, Revolutionary War soldier), sculpted by Martin Milmore. 1875.
- Bust of Patrick Collins, depicts Patrick Andrew Collins, the former mayor of Boston; sculpted by Henry Hudson Kitson and Theo Alice Ruggles Kitson. Moved in 1966 from its original siting at Charlesgate due to construction of the Bowker Overpass.
- The Vendome Memorial, which honors nine firefighters killed in the 1972 Hotel Vendome fire, sculpted by Theodore Clausen with landscape architect Peter White. 1997.
- William Lloyd Garrison, abolitionist and journalist, sculpted by Owen Levi Warner.
- Samuel Eliot Morison, naval historian and writer, sculpted by Penelope Jencks. 1982.
- The Boston Women's Memorial, with statues of Abigail Adams, Lucy Stone, and Phillis Wheatley, sculpted by Meredith Bergmann. 2003.
- Domingo Sarmiento, former president of Argentina, sculpted by Yvette Compagnion. 1973. A gift of the Argentine government in 1913, the statue arrived in Boston sixty years later.
- Leif Ericson, first European discoverer of Newfoundland, sculpted by Anne Whitney. 1887. Commissioned by Eben Norton Horsford, the inventor of baking powder, this statue was originally sited at the Massachusetts Avenue end of this block, but was moved to Charlesgate in 1917. Whitney also created a monument to Leif situated on the shores of Lake Michigan in Milwaukee.
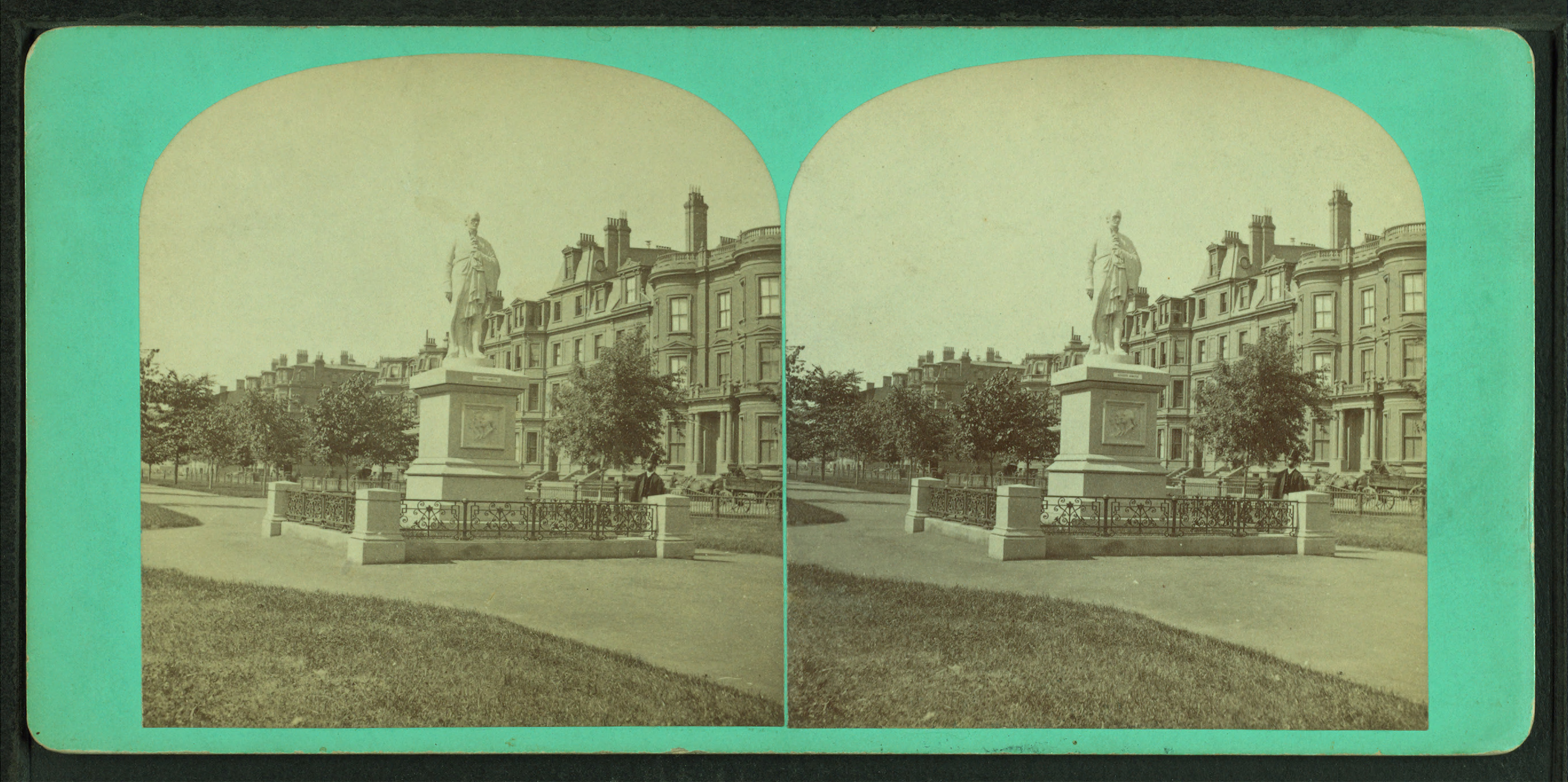
Hamilton Statue, 19th century

Statue of Samuel Eliot Morison on the mall, 2006

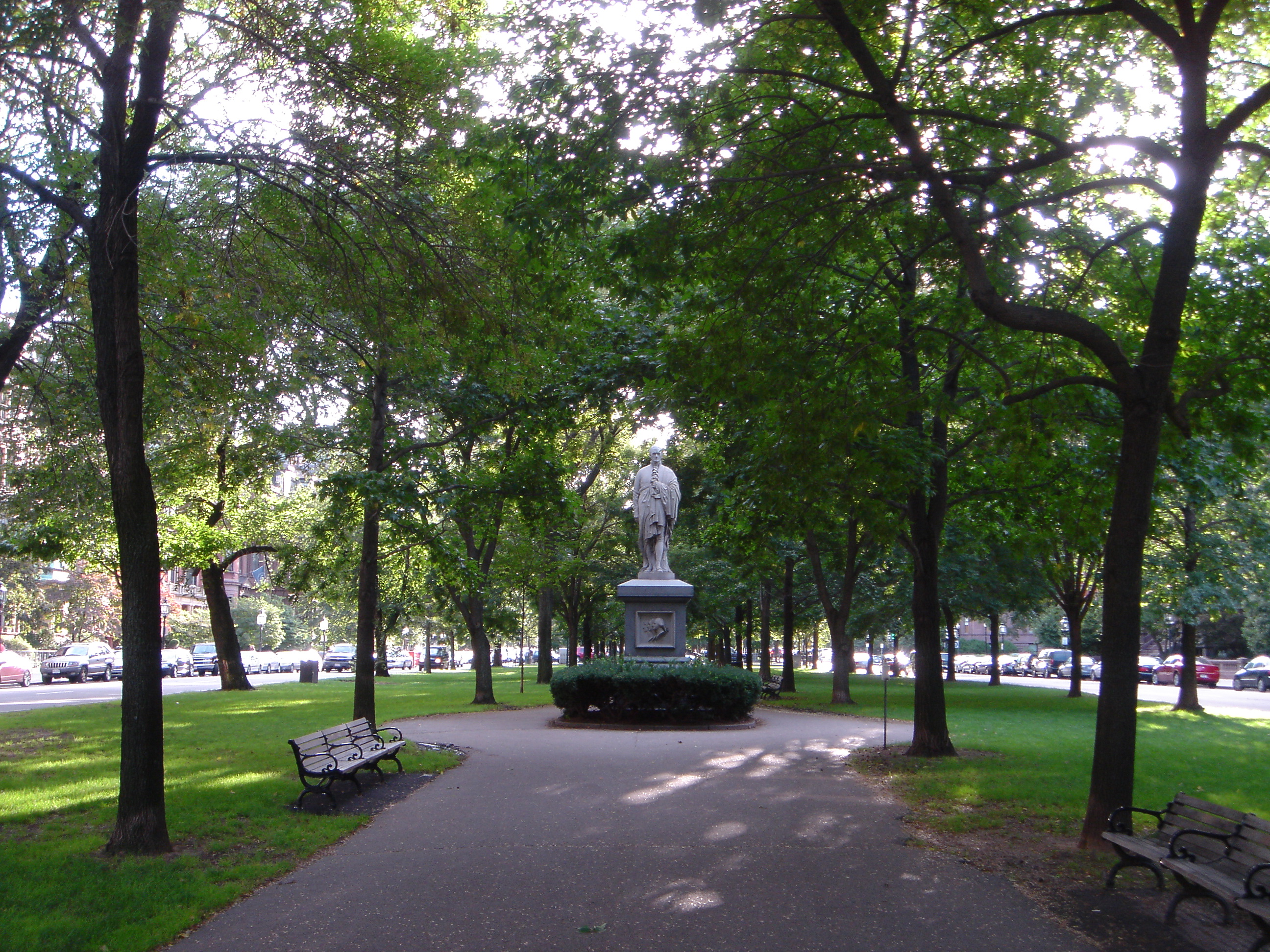
The Commonwealth Avenue Mall looking west towards the Alexander Hamilton statue, 2006

== Gallery ==
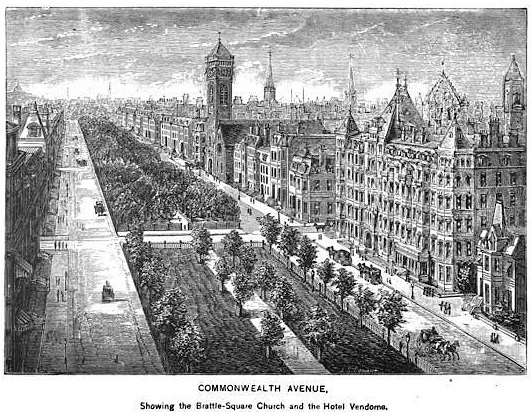
c. 1881

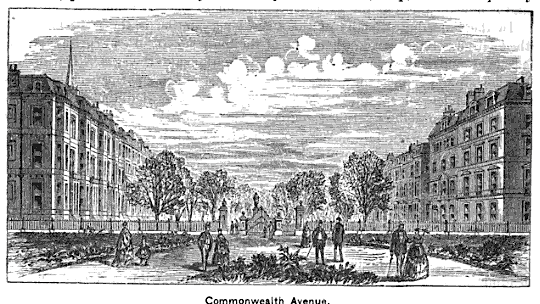
c. 1886

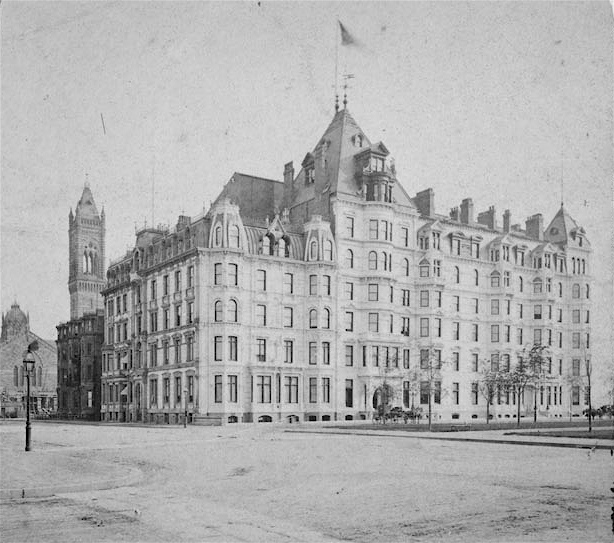
Vendome, 19th century

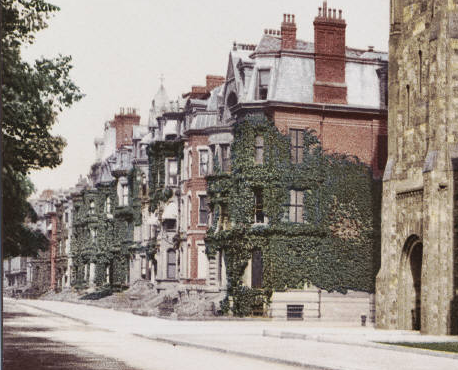
1901

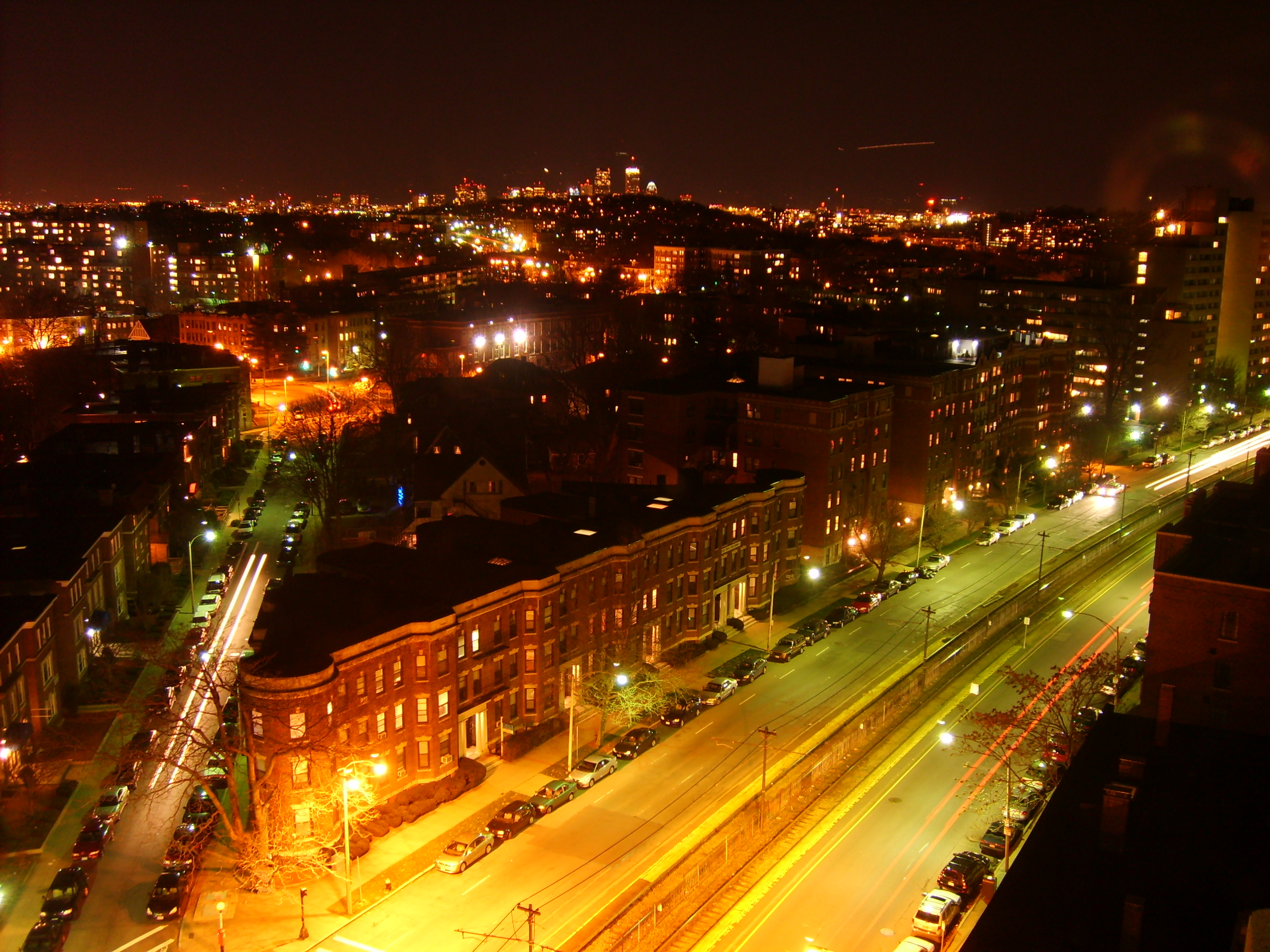
Overview of Commonwealth Ave., Brighton, 2007

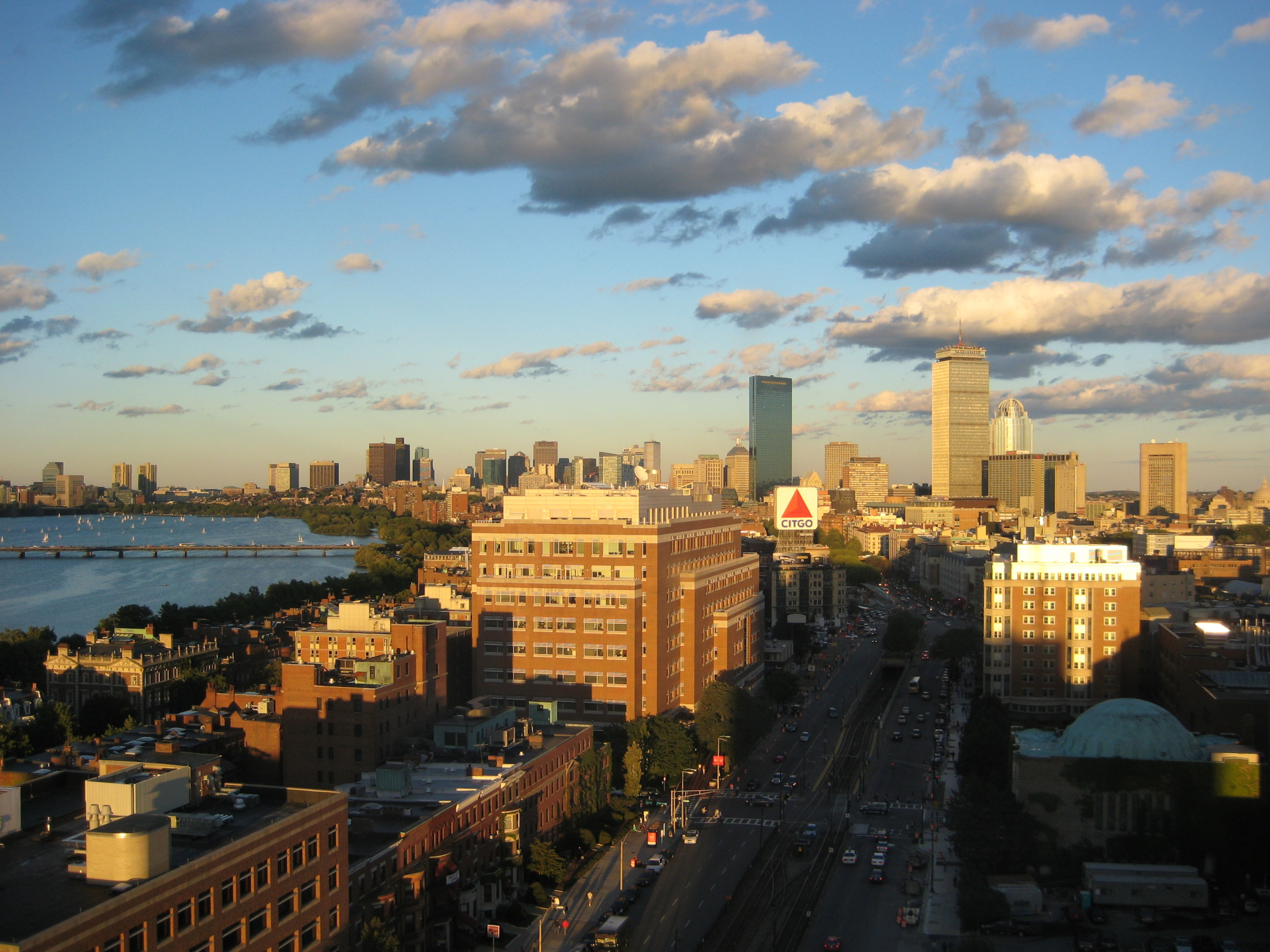
Overview, near Kenmore Square, 2007

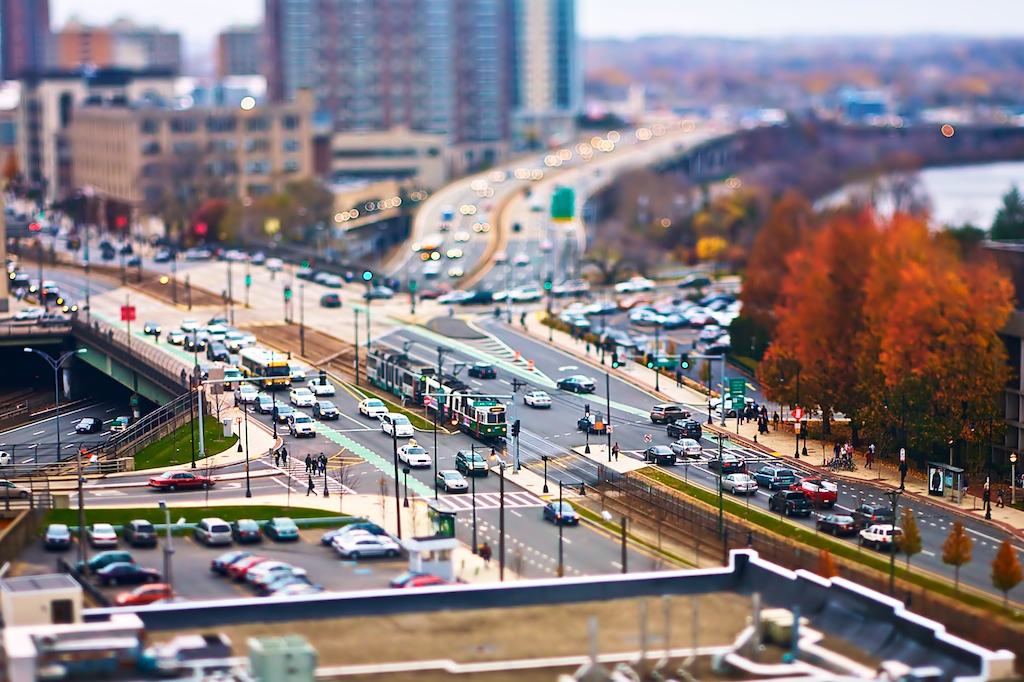
Comm. Ave, near Boston University, 2009

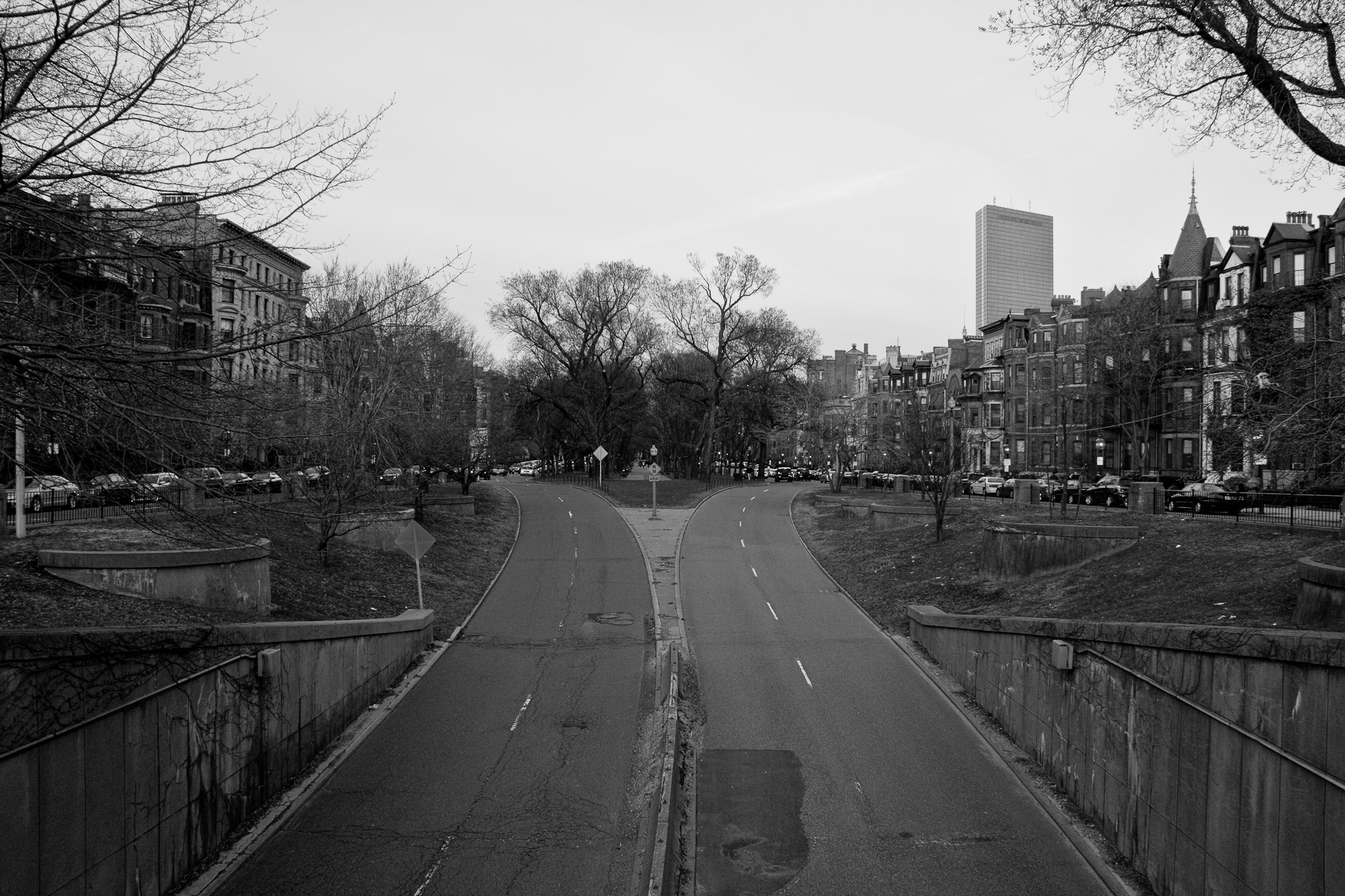
Near Massachusetts Avenue, 2010

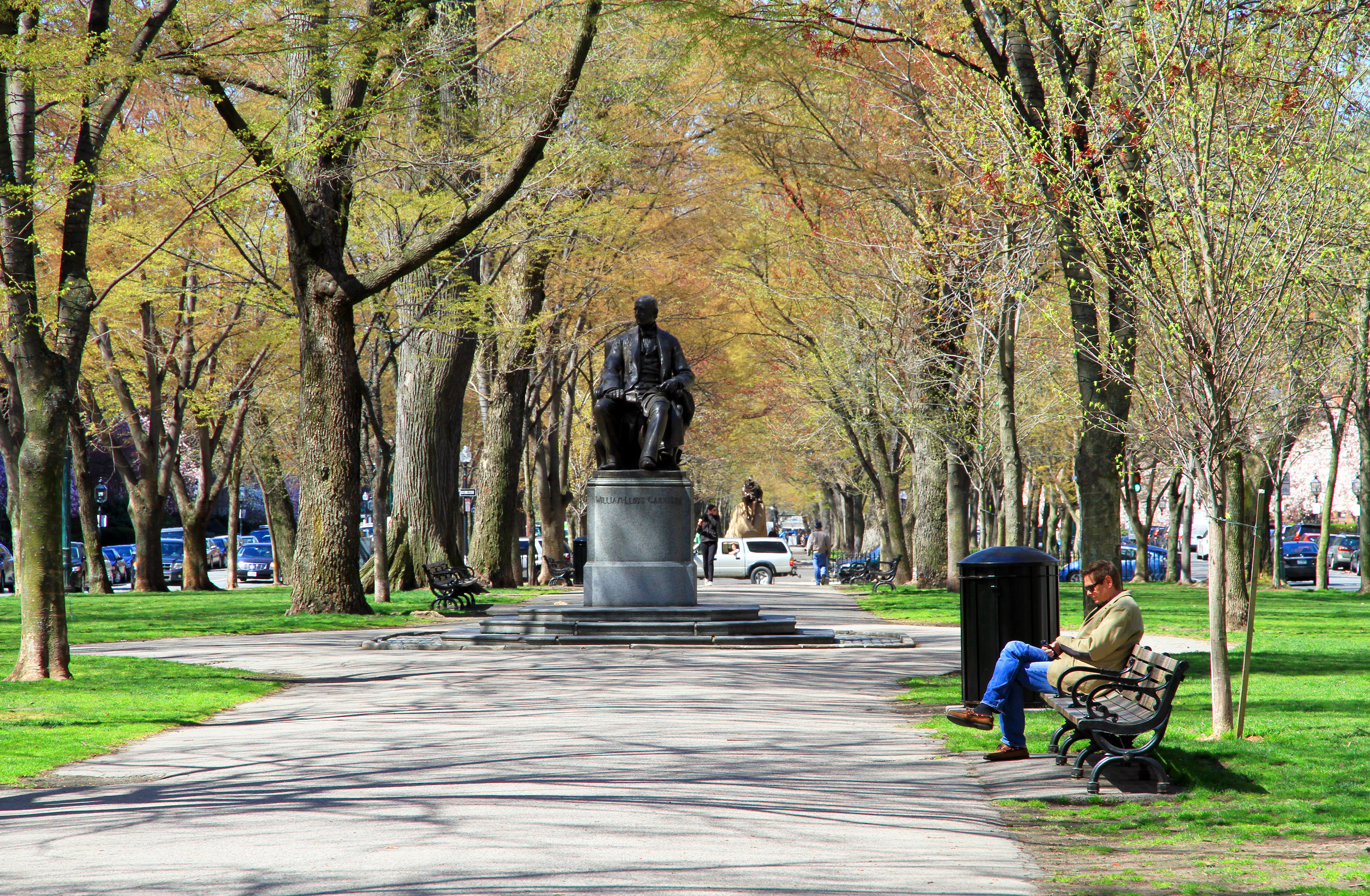
Commonwealth Avenue Mall with statue of William Lloyd Garrison, 2013

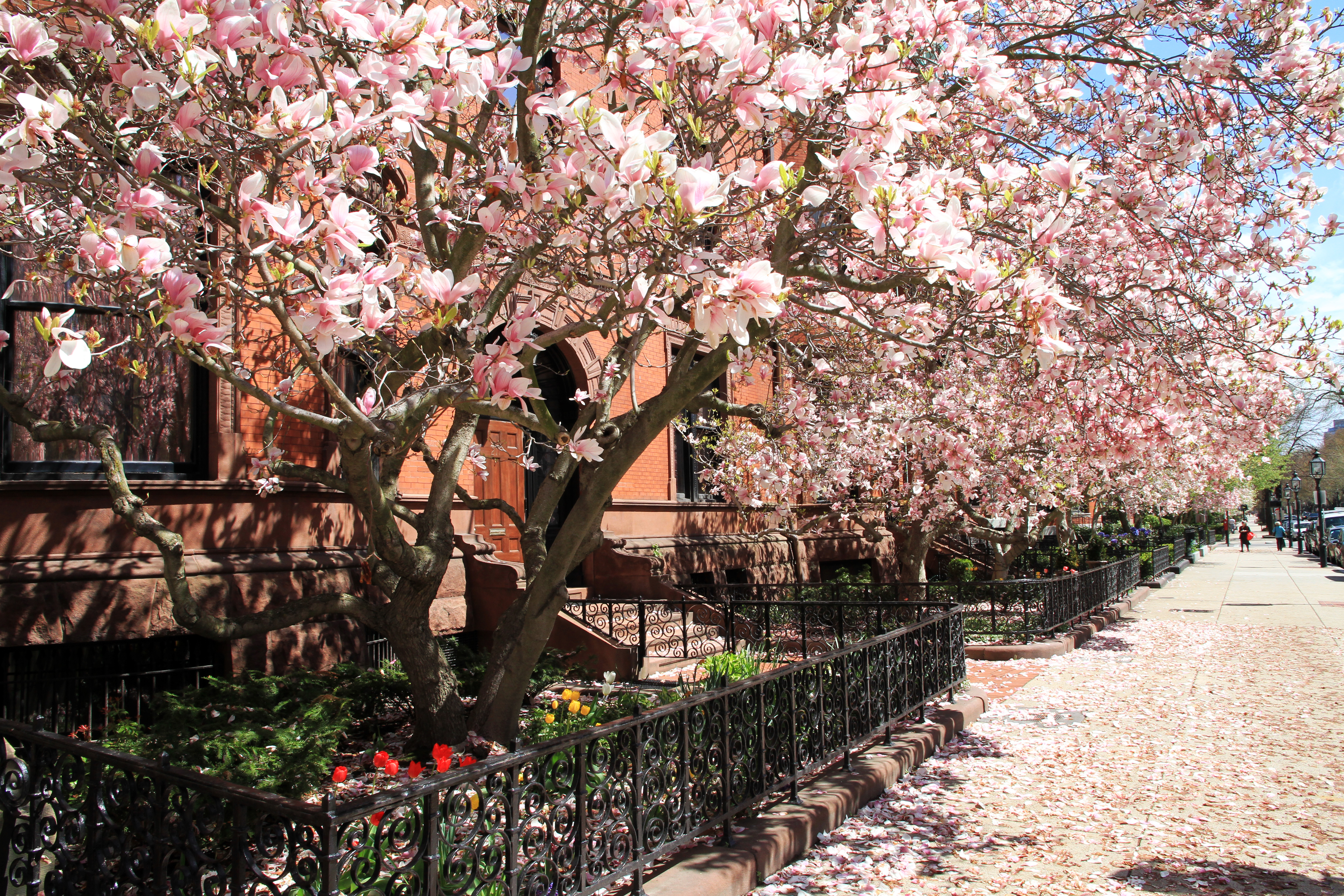
Magnolias, Commonwealth Avenue, 2013

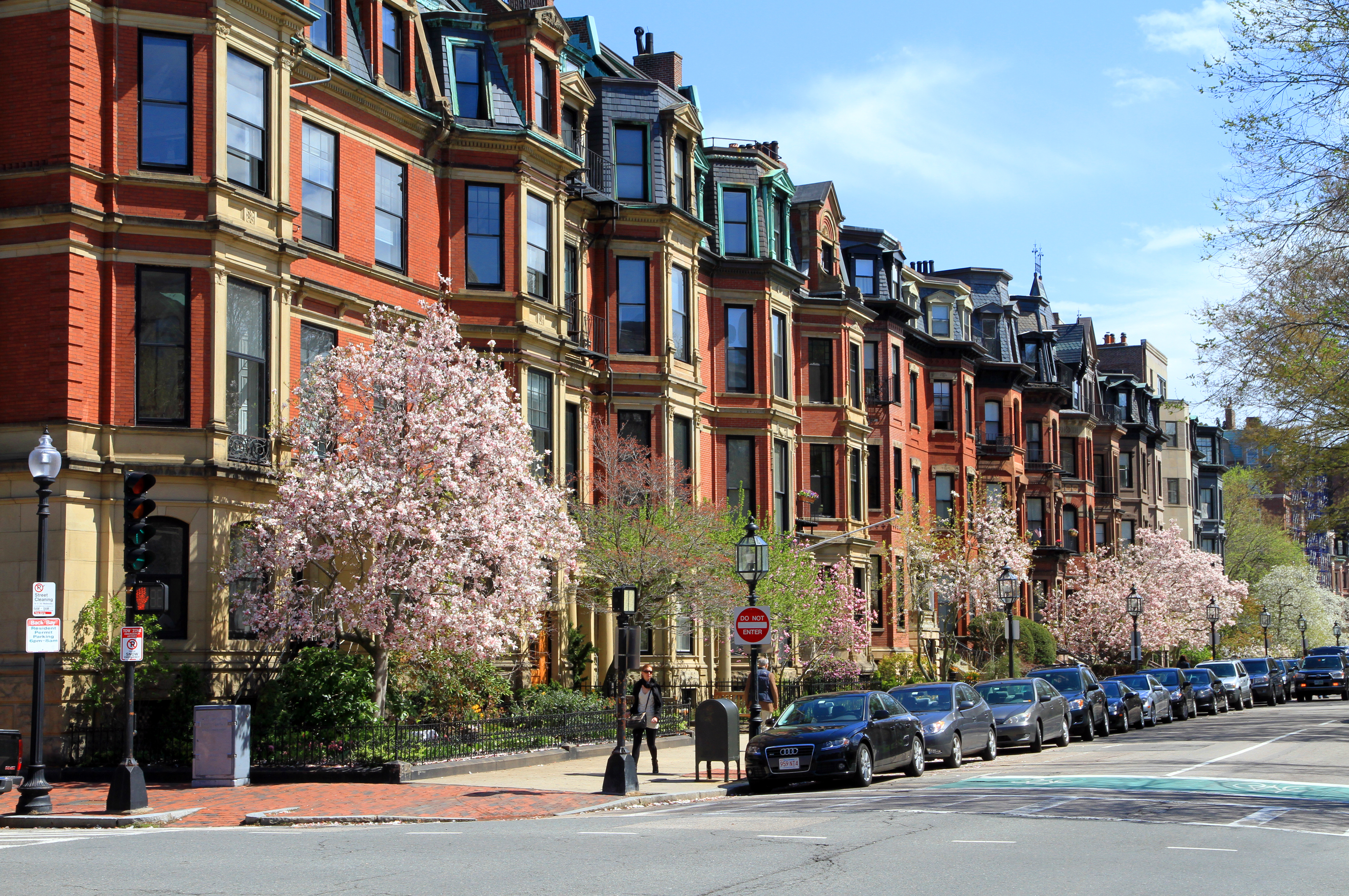
Brownstones
