= Statue of Charles Devens (Boston) =

Statue in Boston, Massachusetts, U.S.

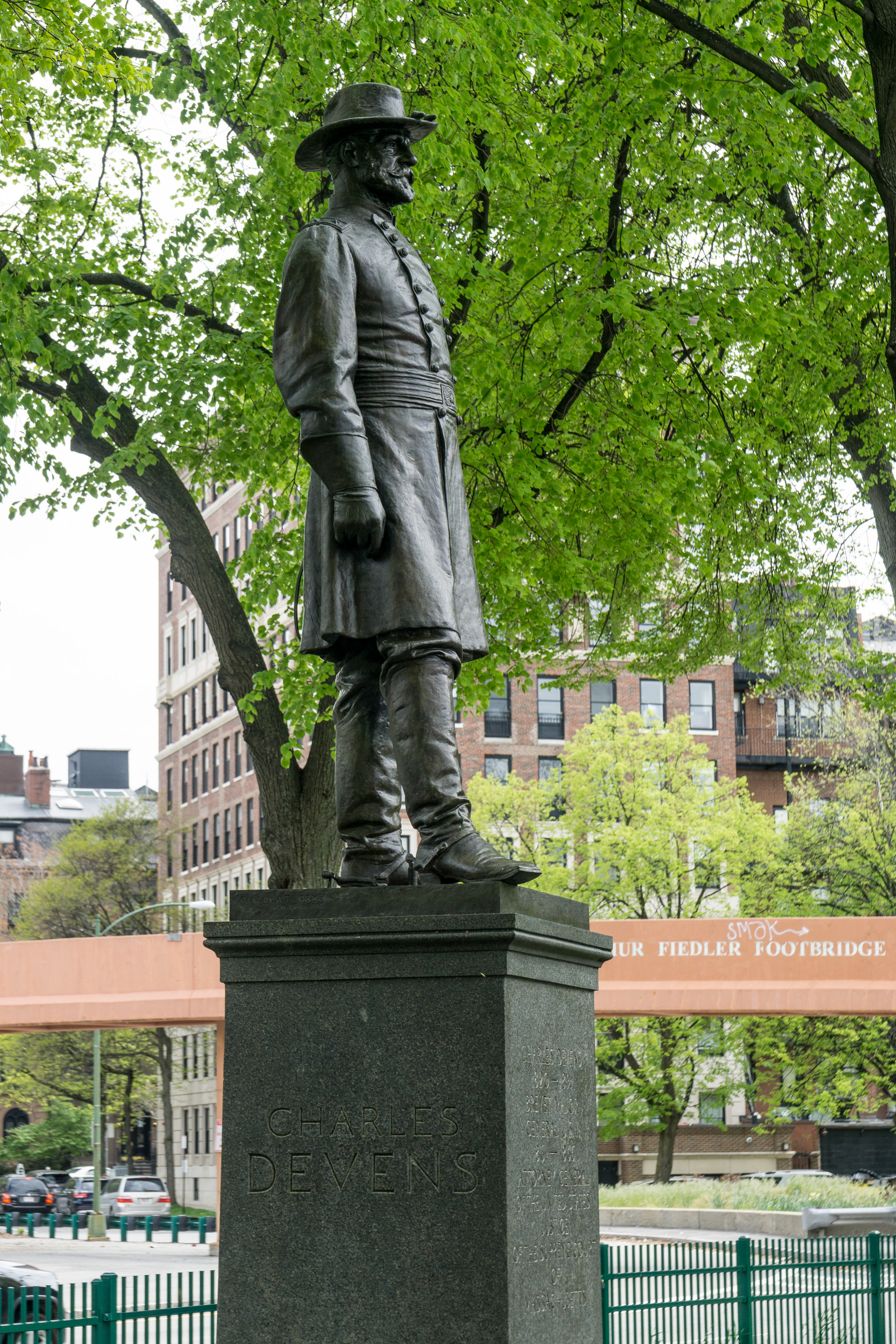
- The statue in 2017
- Artist: Olin Levi Warner
- Subject: Charles Devens
- Location: Boston, Massachusetts, U.S.; 42°21′23.5″N 71°4′24.6″W

A statue of Charles Devens by Olin Levi Warner, sometimes called General Charles Devens, is installed along the Charles River Esplanade, in Boston, Massachusetts, United States.

== Description and history ==
Previously, the bronze sculpture was installed outside the Boston State House, until 1950. It was designed in 1894, cast in 1895, and dedicated in 1986. The statue measures approximately 7 x 3 x 3 ft, and rests on a granite sculpture measuring approximately 7 x 3 x 3 ft. It was surveyed as part of the Smithsonian Institution's "Save Outdoor Sculpture!" program in 1997.
