= Emancipation Memorial (Boston) =

Memorial by Thomas Ball

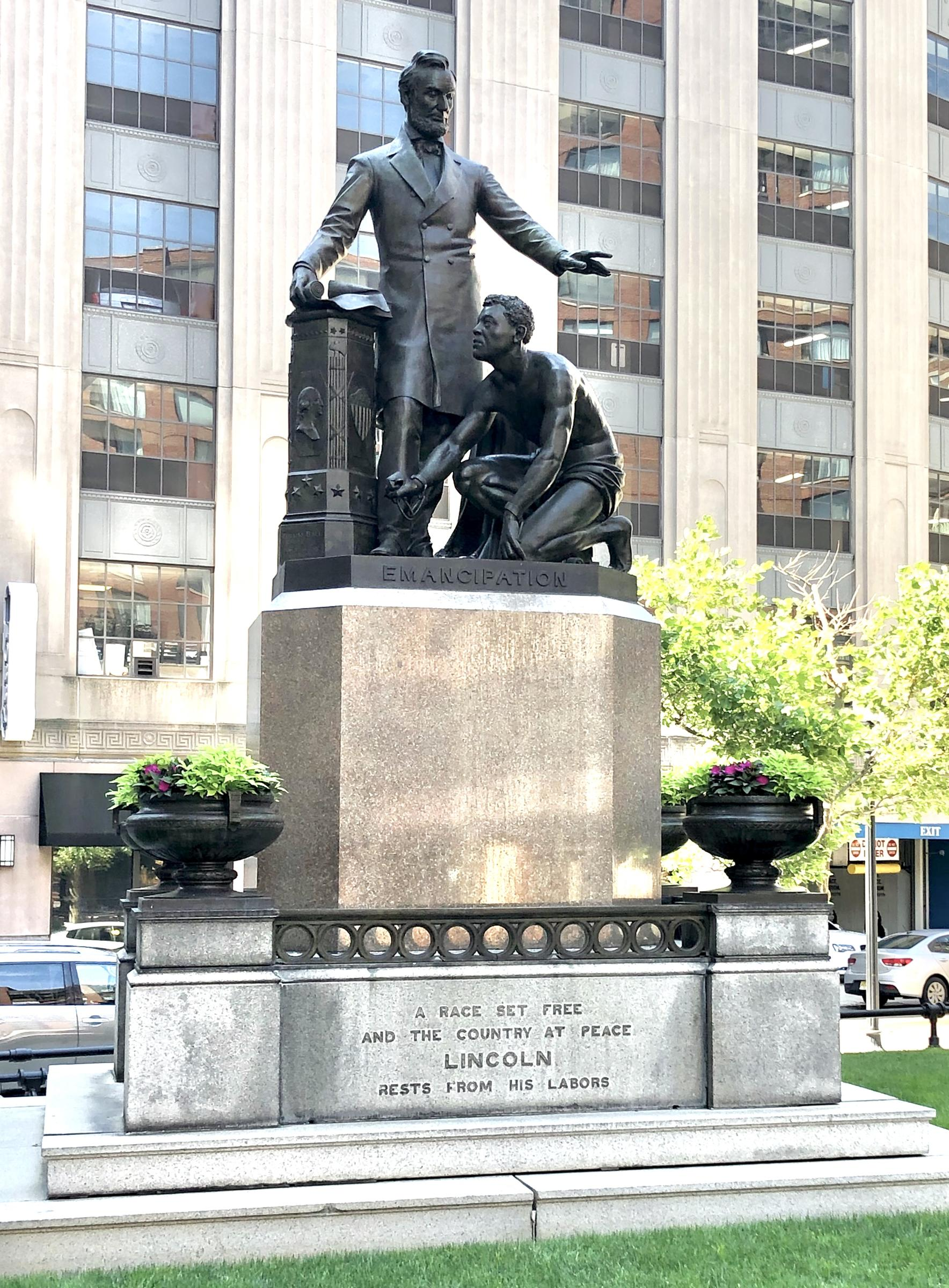
The Emancipation Memorial designed by sculptor Thomas Ball that stood in Boston's Park Square for 141 years.

The Emancipation Memorial, also known as the Freedman's Memorial or the Emancipation Group, was a monument in Park Square in Boston. Designed and sculpted by Thomas Ball and erected in 1879, its sister statue is located in Lincoln Park in the Capitol Hill neighborhood of Washington, D.C. The Boston statue was taken down by the City of Boston on December 29, 2020, following a unanimous vote from the Boston Art Commission on June 30 to remove the memorial.

== Funding ==
Funds for the original statue built in Washington, D.C., in 1876 were raised by formerly enslaved people. The Western Sanitary Commission, a white-run, war-relief agency in St. Louis, managed the funds and design. The Boston replica was built in 1879 and installed in Park Square. Moses Kimball, a well-known public figure, public speaker, politician, and founder of the Boston Museum, donated The Emancipation Group to the city of Boston. Kimball commissioned Ball to duplicate a bronze recasting of the Freedmen's Memorial as a present from him to Boston.

== Design and construction ==
The monument was designed by sculptor Thomas Ball, a native of the Charlestown neighborhood of Boston. Ball, an admirer of President Abraham Lincoln, intended to honor Lincoln and commemorate the historic Emancipation Proclamation with the memorial. Ball initially had an acceptable model made but agreed to the group's request that a real freedman pose for it. William Greenleaf Eliot, a poet also working with the group, sent Ball a photo of Archer Alexander, a former slave who had escaped to freedom and was taken in by Eliot, to serve as the model for the statue. Ball did not, however, incorporate input from the group on the exact design of the monument.

The statue itself depicts President Lincoln holding a copy of his Emancipation Proclamation while granting freedom to an African American slave modeled on Archer Alexander, waving his left hand over the freed slave's head in a symbolic gesture. Looking poised to stand with broken shackles around his ankles and wrists, the freed slave kneels with one fist clenched and the other on his knee. He wears no shirt and stares out into space. Unlike many similar statues, Lincoln and the freed slave do not make eye contact nor physically touch one another.

Kneeling was a common abolitionist motif at the time, appearing on the masthead of the widely read anti-slavery newspaper The Liberator founded by Boston abolitionist William Lloyd Garrison. It also tracks closely with the famous abolitionist emblem:

Another possible inspiration for the statue was an incident in April 1865 in Richmond following the fall of the Confederate capital. On April 4, Lincoln disembarked from the USS Malvern, and was greeted by a group of freed slaves who shouted "Glory Hallelujah" and mobbed the president, some of them kneeling before him and kissing his feet. To them, Lincoln replied "Don't kneel to me. You must kneel to God only and thank Him for your liberty." The scene has been portrayed in other commemoratory works, such as a painting by Black artist Gus Nall commissioned by the State of Illinois in 1963 to commemorate the 100th anniversary of the Emancipation Proclamation.

== Dedication ==
The city held a dedication ceremony on the cold afternoon of December 6, 1879. Massachusetts abolitionist and poet John Greenleaf Whittier wrote a poem for the occasion, concluding with these lines: "Stand in thy place and testify/ To coming ages long,/ That truth is stronger than a lie,/ And righteousness than wrong."

Mayor Frederick Octavius Prince delivered the keynote speech at the ceremony. He told the crowd "it is his [Kimball's] desire, by this memorial bronze, not only to adorn the city and gratify our sense of the beautiful, but to elevate and instruct the popular mind by its solemn lessons of justice, philanthropy, and patriotism." Prince explained the legacy of the monument by stating: "National monuments are epic lessons to future generations. They instruct, admonish, delight, and inspire. That which we dedicate to-day speaks of the most important act in our annals, and commemorates one of the great eras of the Republic, — the emancipation of four millions of slaves!"

The rest of Prince's speech expanded upon his belief that justice had been served by ensuring the key tenets of the Declaration of Independence applied equally to African Americans. Despite his condemnation of slavery and the South, he did not admonish the North for tardiness to act nor offer many encouraging remarks directly to Boston's African American community.

== Criticism ==
Ball received much acclaim and praise at the time for the work, adding to his reputation as one of the renowned monumental artists of his generation. Conversely, the statue has also received thorough criticism for representing paternalistic power dynamics between Lincoln and the freed slave and downplaying the role African Americans had in securing their own liberation. In an 1876 letter to the editor of National Republic, Frederick Douglass, the eminent abolitionist, orator, statesman, and former slave, called the work "admirable" but noted it does not "tell the whole truth of slavery." Douglass also addressed the dedication ceremony for the sister statue in Washington, D.C., on April 4, 1876.

Historian Kirk Savage, in his 1997 book Standing Soldiers, Kneeling Slaves: Race, War, and Monument in Nineteenth-Century America, writes "In bronze, Archer Alexander can never rise and stand, never come to consciousness of his own power." Savage considers how the monument will live and exist in the historical memory of the public, writing "The narrative remains frozen in place, the monument perpetuating its image of racial difference for eternity."

== Public memorials following the Civil War ==
American sculptors commissioned countless public memorials to the Civil War in the years that followed. Some scholars worried that the Civil War would be commemorated only by monuments demonstrating great heroes and bloody battles. Savage describes the "public space as a representational battleground, where many different social groups fight for access and fight to control images that define them." Freeman H.M. Murray, a civil rights activist and author of Emancipation and the Freedman in American Sculpture, raised the question how Americans could "memorialize a past it might rather forget" without erasing the "unsettling memory" of slavery from the record entirely. These public memorials were seen as a way of establishing a set historical narrative to be seen and understood by the public for decades to come, and to establish resolution and consensus rather than conflict.

Boston especially saw a period of renewed interest in the public arts in the 1870s. New statues were created in honor of Boston's heroes and icons to adorn and beautify its parks and streets, with most monuments created by Ball. His other works include the equestrian George Washington statue and Charles Sumner statue located in the Boston Public Garden and a bronze bust of Josiah Quincy III built at the Old City Hall. Other statues built during the era include local heroes John Winthrop and Samuel Adams.

== Park Square ==
Park Square, the small fence-enclosed park that housed the statue for 141 years, is nestled between the busy intersection of Charles Street, Columbus Avenue, and Boylston Street. Park Square had long been the terminus of the Boston & Providence Railroad, continuing to serve as a major transportation center with the Union Bus Terminal in the mid twentieth century. Fashionable shops and restaurants once lined its streets, including a four-sided clock tower that today is a Four Seasons Hotel. In the 1960s, Park Square found itself on the edge of the adult entertainment district downtown known as the Combat Zone.

== Removal ==
=== Growing calls for removal ===
The Black Lives Matter protests and civil unrest sparked by the murder of George Floyd on May 25, 2020, led to a broader campaign to remove monuments seen as honoring racist historical figures or exhibiting racist images. The summer of protests re-opened the conversation of what role statues should serve in public spaces, especially Civil War era statues. More than 224 statues of historical figures and symbols have been removed nationwide since then, taken down both by public officials and crowds of protestors.

Dorchester native and artist Tory Bullock started an online petition in June 2020 calling for the city to take the statue down, garnering more than 12,000 signatures. Bullock recalled that he had seen the statue as a young Black child and had been made uncomfortable by the message it sent. Bullock argued that the statue could serve a better purpose in a museum as a learning tool, stating "I think to put it into a space where we can actually acknowledge that history would be 30 times better than actually leaving it up in public right now."

On June 30, 2020, the Boston Art Commission voted unanimously to take down the monument after two nights of hearings in which residents voiced their opinions about the memorial. Although supporters argued that freed had funded the monument and represented the victory of Emancipation, the commission sided with critics who believed the statue conveyed subservience more than freedom.

Former Mayor Marty Walsh expressed support for the commission's decision in the following statement: "As we continue our work to make Boston a more equitable and just city, it's important that we look at the stories being told by the public art in all of our neighborhoods," Walsh said. "After engaging in a public process, it's clear that residents and visitors to Boston have been uncomfortable with this statue, and its reductive representation of the Black man's role in the abolitionist movement."

=== Movement to storage ===
On December 29, 2020, the City of Boston removed the statue and placed it in a temporary storage facility in South Boston. The future plans for the monument have not been determined, but the city announced it hopes the work will be better moved to a "publicly accessible location where its history and context can be better explained."

Bullock reflected upon the occasion as the statue was hauled away on a flatbed truck, telling WBZ-TV: "It's an amazing funeral. I'm here to provide a silent eulogy for this piece of artwork that's been here for 141 years."

Mark Pasnik, the chair of the Boston Art Commission, told the press that new works will be installed in Park Square, adding that he plans to launch “a series of virtual panel discussions and short-term art installations examining and reimagining our cultural symbols, public art, and histories.”

== Other versions ==
=== D.C. statue ===
The original version of the statue was erected in 1876 in Lincoln Park in the Capitol Hill neighborhood of Washington, D.C. The dedication ceremony was held on April 14, which was attended by President Ulysses S. Grant and other dignitaries including members of Congress, the Supreme Court, and his cabinet. Frederick Douglass delivered the keynote address at the ceremony, despite his overall disappointment in the monument's portrayal of its Black subject and Emancipation. On June 23, 2020, D.C. delegate Eleanor Holmes Norton announced plans to introduce legislation to remove the memorial, but the legislation never materialized. On June 25, a barrier was installed to protect the monument from protestors who vowed to take the memorial down. The statue remains standing and is on the National Register of Historic Places.

=== Methuen ===
Architect Edward Francis Searles purchased an early small demonstration version from Ball and brought it to Methuen, Massachusetts, where it rests in the Town Hall atrium.

=== UWM ===
The Chazen Museum of Art, located on the campus of the University of Wisconsin-Madison, was gifted a version of the statue in white marble by Dr. Warren E. Gilson in 1976.

== See also ==
- List of statues of Abraham Lincoln
- List of monuments and memorials removed during the George Floyd protests
