= Emancipation Memorial =

Memorial by Thomas Ball

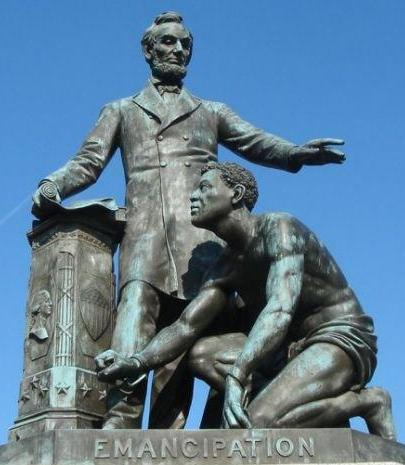
- Artist: Thomas Ball
- Year: 1876
- Type: Bronze
- Location: Lincoln Park (Washington D.C.), United States
- Owner: National Park Service

- Emancipation Memorial
- U.S. National Register of Historic Places
- U.S. Historic district – Contributing property
- Location within Washington, D.C.
- Location: Washington, D.C.
- Coordinates: 38°53′23.3″N 76°59′24.9″W
- Part of: Civil War Monuments in Washington, DC.
- NRHP reference No.: 78000257
- Added to NRHP: September 20, 1978

The Emancipation Memorial, also known as the Freedman's Memorial or the Emancipation Group, is a monument in Lincoln Park in the Capitol Hill neighborhood of Washington, D.C. It was sometimes referred to as the "Lincoln Memorial" before the more prominent national memorial was dedicated in 1922.

Designed and sculpted by Thomas Ball and erected in 1876, the monument depicts Abraham Lincoln holding a copy of his Emancipation Proclamation freeing an enslaved African American man modeled on Archer Alexander. The slave is depicted on one knee, about to stand up, with one fist clenched, shirtless, with broken shackles at the president's feet.

The wages of former slaves funded the Emancipation Memorial statue. The statue initially faced west towards the United States Capitol until it was rotated east in 1974 to face the newly erected Mary McLeod Bethune Memorial.

The statue is a contributing monument to the Civil War Monuments in Washington, D.C., on the National Register of Historic Places.

== Funding ==
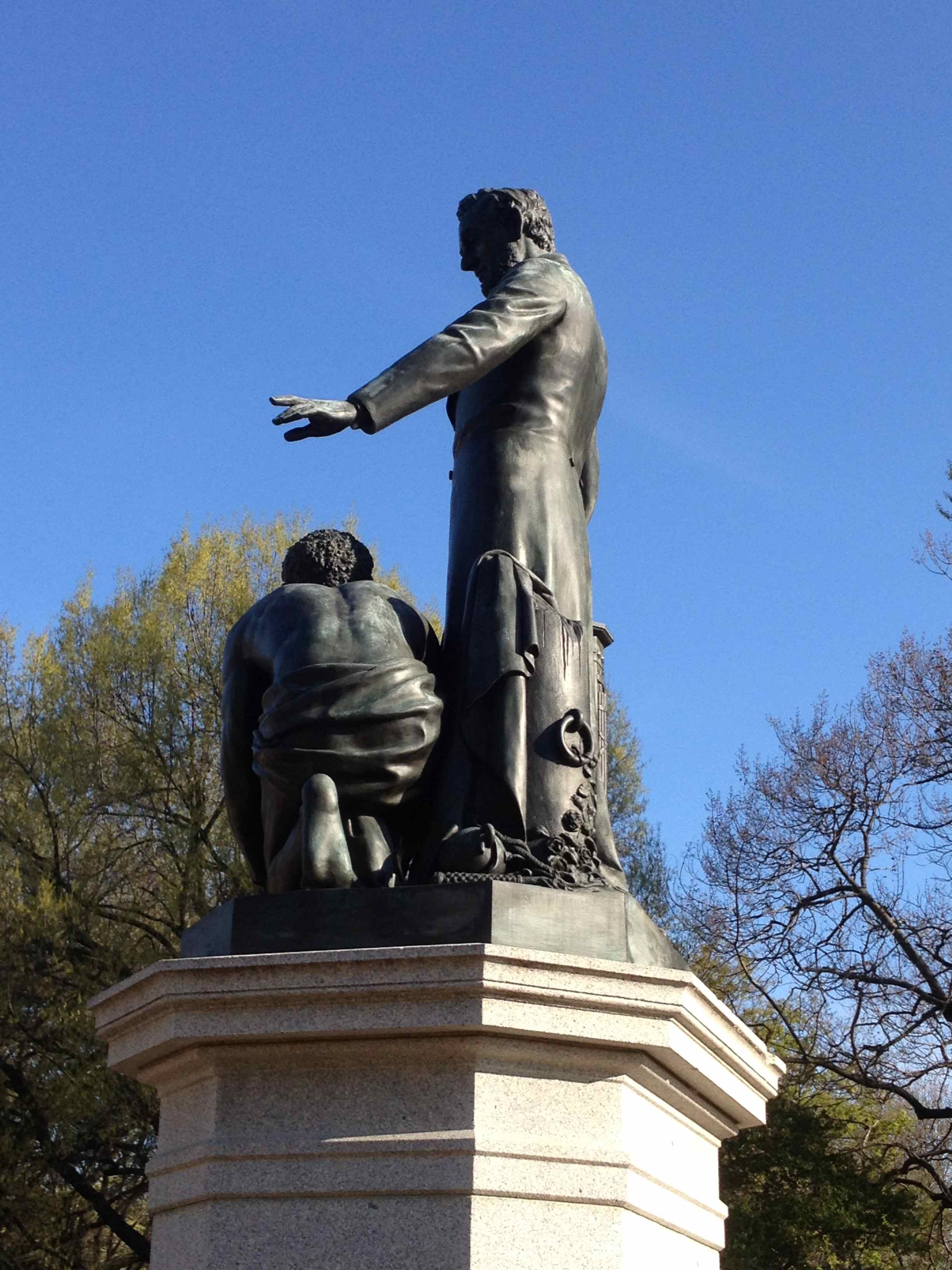
The Emancipation Memorial in 2014

The funding drive for the monument began, according to much-publicized newspaper accounts from the era, with $5 given by former slave Charlotte Scott of Virginia, then residing with the family of her former master in Marietta, Ohio, to create a memorial honoring Lincoln. The Western Sanitary Commission, a St. Louis–based volunteer war-relief agency, joined the effort and raised some $20,000 before announcing a new $50,000 goal.

Another group that attempted to raise funds for the monument in 1865 was the National Lincoln Memorial Association. It was briefly considered merging the original funds with the National Lincoln Memorial Association, but that mission soon failed due to conflicting visions.

According to the National Park Service, the monument was paid for solely by freedmen:

The campaign for the Freedmen's Memorial Monument to Abraham Lincoln, as it was to be known, was not the only effort of the time to build a monument to Lincoln; however, as the only one soliciting contributions exclusively from those who had most directly benefited from Lincoln's act of emancipation it had a special appeal ... The funds were collected solely from freed slaves (primarily from African American Union veterans) ...

The turbulent politics of the reconstruction era affected the fundraising campaign on many levels. The Colored People's Educational Monument Association, headed by Henry Highland Garnet, wanted the monument to serve a didactic purpose as a school where freedmen could elevate themselves through learning. Frederick Douglass disagreed and thought the goal of education was incommensurate with that of remembering Lincoln.

== Design and construction ==
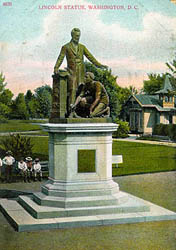
A postcard captioned "Lincoln Statue" depicts the Emancipation Memorial circa 1900.

Harriet Hosmer proposed a grander monument than that suggested by Thomas Ball. Her design, which was ultimately deemed too expensive, posed Lincoln atop a tall central pillar flanked by smaller pillars topped with black Civil War soldiers and other figures.

Mr. Ball was well known through several works when, in 1865, under his first influence of the news of Lincoln's assassination, he'd individually conceived and completed an original half-life-size work in Italian marble. When Ball's design was finally chosen, on the order of the Freedman's Memorial Association, this design, with certain changes, was to be "expanded" to about nine feet high, as the final "Emancipation" group in Lincoln Park in 1876.

Instead of wearing a liberty cap, the slave in the revised monument is depicted bare-headed with tightly curled hair. The face was re-sculpted to look like Archer Alexander, a formerly enslaved man whose life story was popularized by a biography written by William Greenleaf Eliot.

In the final design, as in Ball's original design, Lincoln holds a copy of the Emancipation Proclamation in his right hand. The document rests on a plinth bearing patriotic symbols, including George Washington's profile, the fasces of the U.S. republic, and a shield emblazoned with the stars and stripes. The plinth replaces the pile of books in Ball's original design. Behind the two figures is a whipping post draped with cloth. A vine grows around the pillory and around the ring where the chain was secured.

The monument was cast in Munich in 1875 and shipped to Washington the following year. Congress accepted the statue as a gift from the "colored citizens of the United States" and appropriated $3,000 for a pedestal upon which it would rest. The statue was erected in Lincoln Park, where it still stands.

A plaque on the monument names it as "Freedom's Memorial in grateful memory of Abraham Lincoln" and reads:

This monument was erected by the Western Sanitary Commission of Saint Louis Mo: With funds contributed solely by emancipated citizens of the United States declared free by his proclamation January 1 A.D. 1863. The first contribution of five dollars was made by Charlotte Scott. A freedwoman of Virginia being her first earnings in freedom and consecrated by her suggestion and request on the day she heard of President Lincoln's death to build a monument to his memory

== Dedication ==
Frederick Douglass spoke as the keynote speaker at the dedication service on April 14, 1876, the eleventh anniversary of Lincoln's death. President Ulysses S. Grant attended the service with members of his cabinet, Congress, and the Supreme Court. A procession preceded the service, where the Howard University law school dean, John Mercer Langston, was in attendance. The dedication was declared a federal holiday.

Douglass explained that Lincoln's legacy was complex. "Truth compels me to admit, even here in the presence of the monument we have erected to his memory. Abraham Lincoln was not, in the fullest sense of the word, either our man or our model. In his interests, in his associations, in his habits of thought, and in his prejudices, he was a white man." He pointed out that Lincoln was more motivated to save the union than to abolish slavery, telling the New York Tribune: "If I could save the union without freeing any slave, I would do it; and if I could save it by freeing all the slaves, I would do it; and if I could save it by freeing some and leaving others alone, I would also do that." Douglass said that Lincoln "strangely told us that we were the cause of the war"—in 1862, Lincoln had told African-American leaders visiting the White House, "But for your presence amongst us, there would be no war." Douglass had many complaints about Lincoln's treatment of African Americans willing to fight in the war. But in the end, he judged Lincoln on his accomplishment rather than his motivation, saying: "It was enough for us that Abraham Lincoln was at the head of a great movement, and was in living and earnest sympathy with that movement."

After delivering the speech, Frederick Douglass immediately wrote a letter to the editor of the National Republican newspaper in Washington, which was published five days later on April 19, 1876. In his letter, Douglass criticized the statue's design and suggested the park could be improved by more dignified monuments of free Black people. "The negro here, though rising, is still on his knees and nude", Douglass wrote. "What I want to see before I die is a monument representing the negro, not couchant on his knees like a four-footed animal, but erect on his feet like a man."

== Criticism ==
Rodney Young of American University wrote that:

If there is one slavery monument whose origins are highly political, the Freedman's memorial is it. The development process for this memorial started immediately after Abraham Lincoln's assassination and ended, appropriately enough, near the end of Reconstruction in 1876. In many ways, it exemplified and reflected the hopes, dreams, striving, and ultimate failures of reconstruction.

The monument has been criticized for its paternalistic character and for not doing justice to the role that African Americans played in their liberation. While the funds for the monument were raised from former slaves, a white artist conceived the original design. An alternative design depicting Lincoln with uniformed black Union soldiers was rejected as too expensive. According to historian Kirk Savage, a witness to the memorial's dedication recorded Frederick Douglass as saying that the statue "showed the Negro on his knees when a more manly attitude would have been indicative of freedom". In a recently uncovered letter from Douglass that appeared in the National Republican five days after the dedication, he said that the monument did not tell the "whole truth of any subject which it might be designed to illustrate". Douglass also says that while Lincoln breaks the slave's chains in the monument, the granting of his U.S. citizenship is not represented.

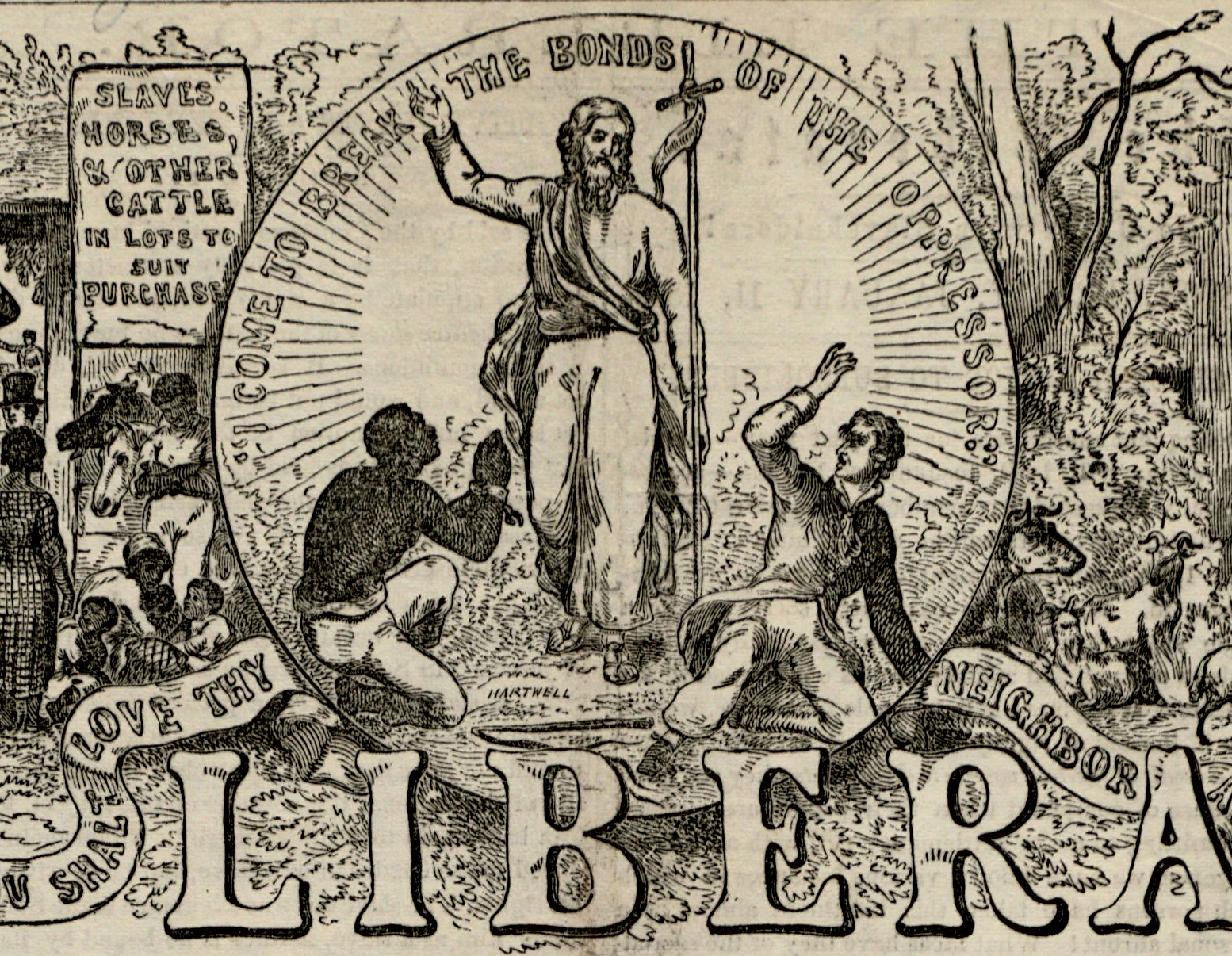
Detail from the masthead of The Liberator

What I want to see before I die is a monument representing the negro, not couchant on his knees like a four-footed animal, but erect on his feet like a man. There is room in Lincoln park for another monument, and I throw out this suggestion to the end that it may be taken up and acted upon.

Jonathan White and Scott Sandage, two historians who rediscovered the letter, detailed their findings in Smithsonian Magazine in June 2020. They saw in it "a solution to the current impasse" over the Emancipation Memorial. Since no one statue could provide the whole truth, they suggested enriching the memorial group by adding statues of Charlotte Scott, whose contribution began the process, and Frederick Douglass, who dedicated the original monument, to create a new "Emancipation Group", as the monument was sometimes called. Lincoln biographer Sidney Blumenthal noted that the kneeling enslaved man was a widespread abolitionist motif, appearing on the masthead of William Lloyd Garrison's abolitionist newspaper, The Liberator.

=== 2020 protests ===
On June 23, 2020, U.S. Delegate for D.C. Eleanor Holmes Norton announced plans to introduce legislation to remove the Memorial. That same day, protesters on site vowed to dismantle the statue on Thursday, June 25, at 7:00 p.m. local time. A barrier fence was installed around the memorial to protect it from vandalism, which was later removed. Norton reintroduced her bill on February 18, 2021.

== Other versions ==
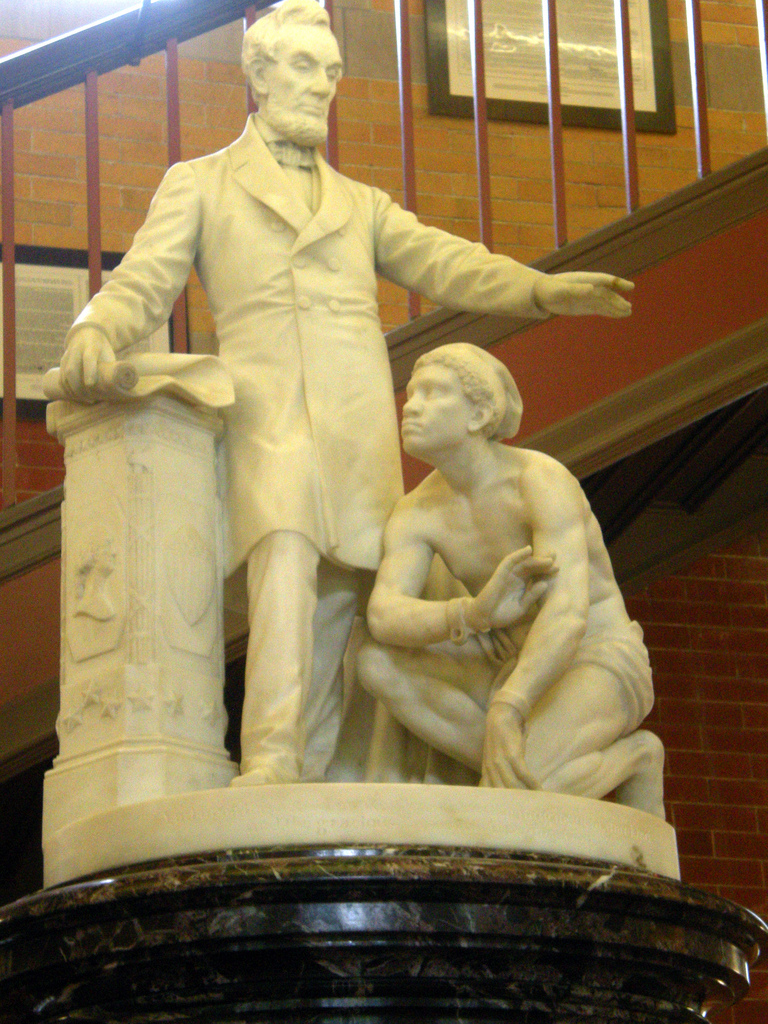
This early small demonstration version by Ball was purchased by Edward Francis Searles. It is now located in the atrium of the Methuen, Massachusetts Town Hall.

In 1879, Moses Kimball, for whom Ball had once worked at the Boston Museum, donated a copy of the statue to Boston. It was located in Park Square. In July 2020, the Boston Art Commission voted to remove the statue after conducting a public debate on the statue's meaning. The statue made many feel uncomfortable; many felt it lacked a proper narrative for the trauma it represents. The future state of this statue has not been decided. Still, it was removed from the Boston park on December 29, 2020.

Architect Edward Francis Searles purchased an early miniature demonstration version from Ball and brought it to Methuen, Massachusetts, where it rests in the Town Hall atrium.

The Chazen Museum of Art, located on the campus of the University of Wisconsin-Madison, was gifted a version of the statue in white marble by Dr. Warren E. Gilson in 1976.

There were plans in 1879 to commission a duplicate for East Dedham Square in Dedham, Massachusetts, but those plans did not come to fulfilment. (Note: A statue of William B. Gould was unveiled in 2023, just a few steps away.)

== See also ==
- African American Civil War Memorial
- List of statues of Abraham Lincoln
- List of public art in Washington, D.C., Ward 6
- List of sculptures of presidents of the United States
