= Archer Alexander =

Former black slave and statue model

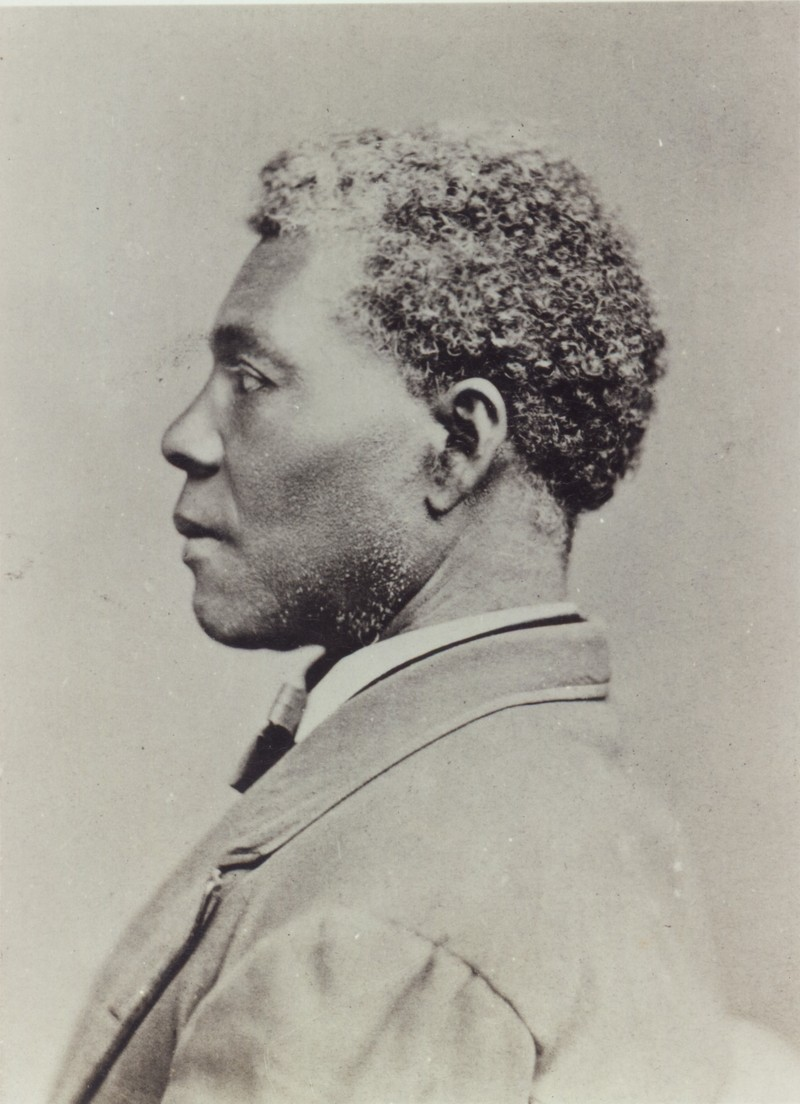
- Born: 1816; Lexington, Virginia, U.S.
- Died: December 8, 1879 (aged 62–63); St. Louis, Missouri, U.S.
- Occupation: Model
- Relatives: Rahaman Ali (great-great-great grandson); Muhammad Ali (great-great-great grandson)

Archer Alexander (1816 – December 8, 1879) was a formerly enslaved American man who served as the model for the "emancipated slave" in the Emancipation Memorial 1876 located in Lincoln Park in Washington, D.C. He was the subject of an 1885 biography, The Story of Archer Alexander, from Slavery to Freedom, March 30, 1863 by William Greenleaf Eliot. Eliot's account of Alexander's life is partly historical fiction, as portions of the narrative were altered by his close friend Jesse Benton Fremont at the request of the publishers.

== Early years ==
Alexander was born enslaved by the Alexander family near Lexington, Virginia, about 1816. He and his wife Louisa were brought to Dardenne Prairie, Missouri, in St. Charles County by slaver James H. Alexander in 1829. Louisa, was owned by Nancy, wife of James H. Alexander, who inherited Louisa from her father Dr. Robert McCluer. In 1835, following the deaths of James and Nancy Alexander, their property and slaves were managed by their executor, William M. Campbell.

Besides working for Campbell, Archer Alexander was leased out as a carpenter, stonemason, and bricklayer. Campbell later sold off the property and slaves on behalf of the Alexanders' children, splitting up Archer, Louisa, and seven of their children: Eliza (valued at $325), Mary Ann ($300), Archer ($225), James ($200), Alexander ($175), Lucinda ($150), and John ($125). Three of their children, Nellie, William, and Wesley, had already been sold by this time. Louisa became enslaved by James Naylor, a merchant, postmaster, and former Presbyterian elder living in Missouri on the Boone's Lick Road; Archer Alexander became enslaved by Richard H. Pitman, near Cottleville, Missouri.

== American Civil War ==
During the American Civil War, Alexander overheard a meeting of local slavers discussing a plot to sabotage a nearby railroad bridge using arms and ammunition stored in Captain James Campbell's icehouse. In February 1863, Alexander covertly notified a group of U.S. Army soldiers under the command of Lt. Col. Arnold Krekel that the Peruque Creek railroad bridge had been sabotaged by Confederate insurgents. Archer was shortly thereafter suspected of being the source of this information and fled the Pitman farm. He was captured by local slave catchers once but broke free. He continued on the Underground Railroad and found refuge in the home of William Greenleaf Eliot in St. Louis. There, he obtained employment in Eliot's house and was protected by a U.S. provost marshal. Pitman sent slave catchers to Eliot's home to kidnap and re-enslave Alexander, putting Archer Alexander in the City Jail to be sold. Eliot rescued Alexander and contacted Pitman to purchase the man to emancipate him. However, on September 24, 1863, the St. Louis newspapers announced that Archer Alexander had been liberated by the Confiscation Act of 1862 because of his service to the U.S. military and Pitman's disloyalty to the United States. That fall, Alexander paid a German farmer to help Louisa and his daughters escape from Naylor and join him in St. Louis, where she was also granted emancipation. Eliot's biography of Alexander reports that in 1865, Louisa returned to Naylor's house for things she had left there. Alexander later learned that Louisa had died two days after her arrival of an unidentified cause. The location of her grave is unknown.

== Emancipation Memorial ==
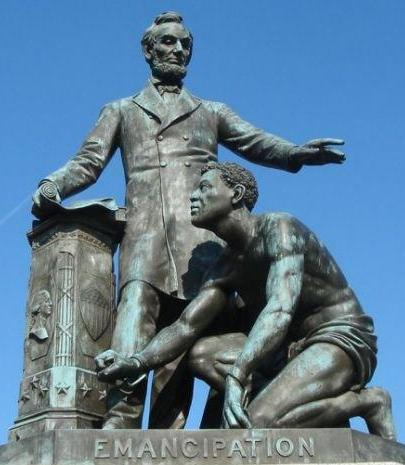
Thomas Ball's Emancipation Memorial depicting Abraham Lincoln emancipating a slave. Archer Alexander was the model for the enslaved person.

In 1865, Eliot was working with the Western Sanitary Commission to build a statue of Lincoln. The funding for an Emancipation Memorial featuring a statue of Lincoln had begun with a $5 donation from a former slave, Charlotte Scott, from Virginia. All initial funds raised were donations from freedmen and U.S. Colored Troops. They were held in trust for them by the Western Sanitary Commission, a St. Louis-based volunteer war relief agency. Thomas Ball made an acceptable model in 1865, but Eliot's group wanted a real freedman to pose for it. In 1869, Eliot gave Ball a photo of Alexander, and he was chosen as the model.

In 1876, the statue was unveiled, with many notable people in attendance, including President Ulysses S. Grant, members of his cabinet, Supreme Court justices, other government figures, and Frederick Douglass, another former slave. However, neither Alexander nor Eliot was present.

== Death and aftermath ==
Archer Alexander died in St. Louis, Missouri, on December 8, 1879. His funeral was held in his church, which was across from his home, Washington Metropolitan A.M.E. Zion Church. Alexander was buried in a common lot and unmarked grave at St. Peters U.C.C. Cemetery on Lucas and Hunt in Normandy, Missouri. The burial site was added to the Underground Railroad Network to Freedom in 2024.

According to DNA research, boxer Muhammad Ali was a great-great-great-grandson of Alexander.
