= Josiah Quincy III =

American educator and politician (1772–1864)

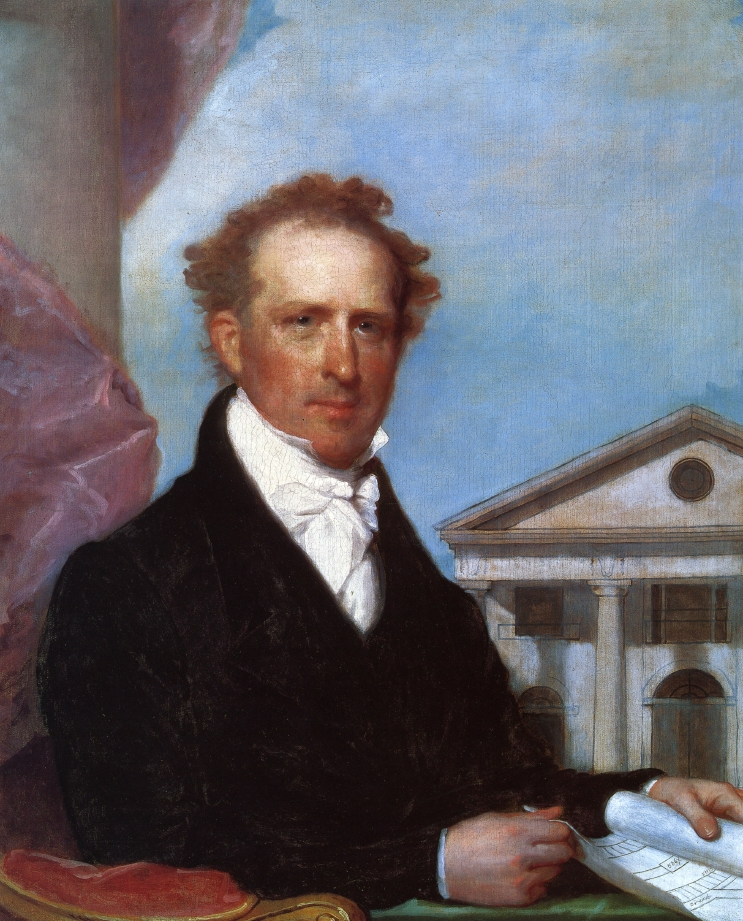
- Portrait by Gilbert Stuart, c. 1824–1825

Member of the U.S. House of Representatives from Massachusetts's 1st district
- In office March 4, 1805 – March 3, 1813
- Preceded by: William Eustis
- Succeeded by: Artemas Ward Jr.

2nd Mayor of Boston, Massachusetts
- In office May 1, 1823 – January 5, 1829
- Preceded by: John Phillips
- Succeeded by: Harrison Gray Otis

Speaker of the Massachusetts House of Representatives
- In office January 10, 1821 – 1822
- Preceded by: Elijah H. Mills
- Succeeded by: Luther Lawrence

15th President of Harvard University
- In office 1829–1845
- Preceded by: John Thornton Kirkland
- Succeeded by: Edward Everett

Personal details
- Born: February 4, 1772 Boston, Massachusetts Bay, British America
- Died: July 1, 1864 (aged 92) Quincy, Massachusetts, U.S.
- Resting place: Mount Auburn Cemetery
- Party: Federalist
- Spouse: Eliza Susan Morton (m. 1797)
- Children: Eliza Susan Quincy, Josiah Quincy Jr., Abigail Phillips Quincy, Maria Sophia Quincy, Margaret Morton Quincy, Edmund Quincy, Anna Cabot Lowell Quincy
- Relatives: Quincy family
- Education: Harvard University
- Occupation: Politician; university president

Josiah Quincy III (/ˈkwɪnzi/; February 4, 1772 – July 1, 1864) was an American educator and political figure. He was a member of the U.S. House of Representatives (1805–1813), mayor of Boston (1823–1828), and President of Harvard University (1829–1845). The historic Quincy Market in downtown Boston is named in his honor. A panel of 69 scholars in 1993 ranked him among the ten best mayors in American history.

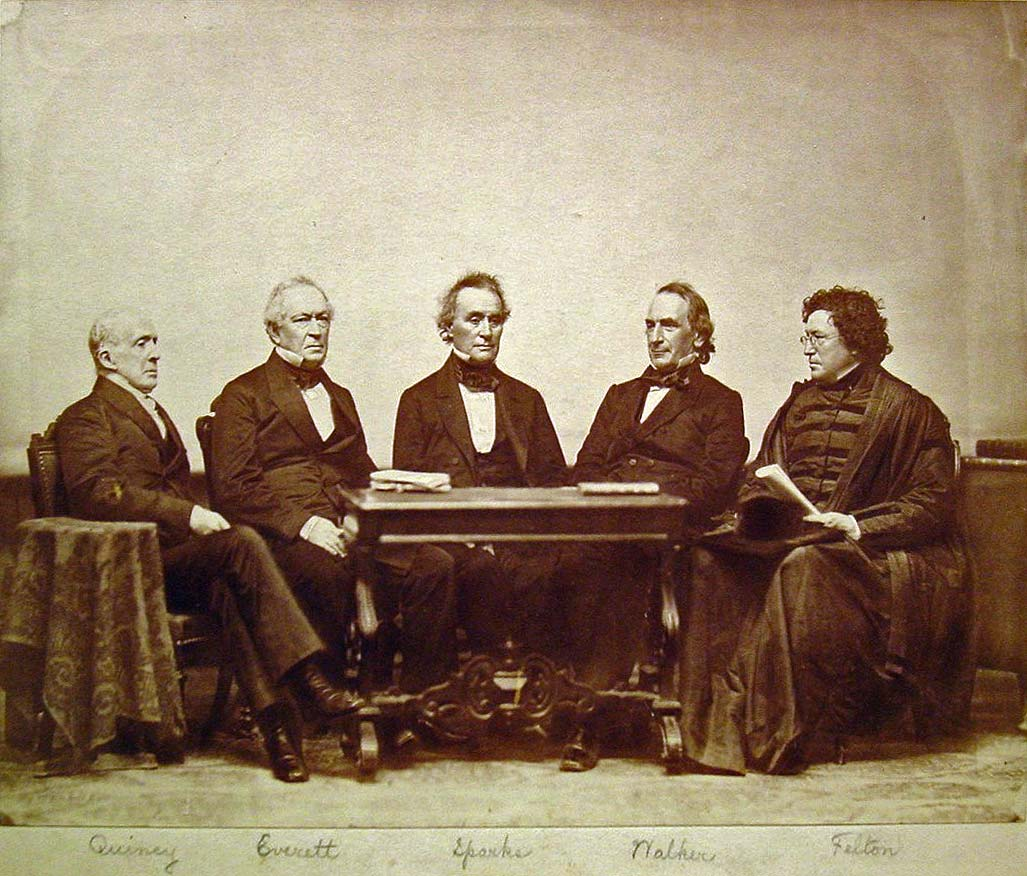
Five Harvard University Presidents sitting in order of when they served. L-R: Josiah Quincy III, Edward Everett, Jared Sparks, James Walker and Cornelius Conway Felton

== Early life and education ==
Quincy was born February 4, 1772, in Boston, on the part of present-day Washington Street in Boston then known as Marlborough Street. He was the son of Josiah Quincy II and Abigail Phillips. He was a descendant of the Rev. George Phillips of Watertown, the progenitor of the New England Phillips family in America.

Quincy's father traveled to England in 1774, partly for his health but mainly as an agent of the Patriot cause to meet with the friends of the colonists in London. Josiah Quincy II died off the coast of Gloucester, England on April 26, 1775, when Josiah was a little over three years old.

Josiah Quincy III entered Phillips Academy in Andover, Massachusetts, when it opened in 1778, and graduated from Harvard University in 1790. After his graduation from Harvard, he studied law for three years under the tutorship of William Tudor. Quincy was admitted to the bar in 1793, but was never a prominent advocate.

== Career ==
In 1798, Quincy was appointed Boston's town orator for the Fourth of July by the Board of Selectmen, where his oratory garnered much favorable attention. In 1800 he was elected to the School Committee.

=== Massachusetts Senate ===
Despite being only 28, Quincy became a leader of the Federalist Party in Massachusetts and was an unsuccessful candidate for the United States House of Representatives in 1800. He served in the Massachusetts Senate from 1804 to 1805. He was elected a Fellow of the American Academy of Arts and Sciences in 1803.

=== U.S. House of Representatives ===
From 1805 to 1813, he was a member of the United States House of Representatives where he was one of the small Federalist minority. In the dark days of the Embargo in the second term of President Thomas Jefferson, he suggested his impeachment. In Congress, he attempted to secure the exemption of fishing vessels from the Embargo Act, urged the strengthening of the United States Navy, and vigorously opposed the admittance of Louisiana as a state in 1811. In this last matter he stated as his "deliberate opinion, that if this bill passes, the bonds of this Union are virtually dissolved; that the States that compose it are free from their moral obligations; and that, as it will be the right of all, so it will be the duty of some, to prepare definitely for a separation, amicably if they can, violently if they must." This was probably the first assertion of the right of secession on the floor of Congress. Quincy left Congress because he saw that the Federalist opposition was useless.

In 1812, Quincy was a founding member of the American Antiquarian Society.

=== State legislator ===
After leaving Congress, Quincy served as a member of the Massachusetts Senate until 1820. In 1821–22, he was a member and speaker of the Massachusetts House of Representatives. Quincy resigned from the legislature to become judge of the municipal court of Boston.

=== Mayor of Boston ===
Quincy was a candidate for mayor of Boston in Boston's first election under a city charter, held on April 8, 1822. The votes of this first election were evenly split between Quincy and Harrison Gray Otis, with a few votes to others. Neither Quincy nor Otis had a majority, so neither was elected. They both withdrew their candidacies, and John Phillips was elected Boston's first mayor. In 1823 Quincy was elected as the second mayor of Boston; he served six one-year terms from 1823 to 1828. During his terms as mayor, Quincy Market was built, the fire and police departments were reorganized, and the city's care of the poor was systematized.

Quincy was responsible for leading the shutdown of the Boston High School for Girls in 1826. In 1871, a report of the Commissioner of Education was published and on page 512 an account of the organization of the Boston High School for Girls was written. Isabel Bevier's publication of The Home Economics Movement recounts that, "On September 25, 1825, the city council appropriated $2,000 for a high school for girls. The school was instituted January 13, 1825, and before the end of the second year had become so popular, the applicants for admission were so numerous, so many parents were disappointed that children were not received, the demand for larger and better accommodations involved such additional expenditures, that the school committee, under the lead of the mayor, Josiah Quincy, met the emergency by abolishing the school and pronouncing it a failure. For a period of twenty-three years no attempt was made to revive the subject in either branch of the city council." A 1993 survey of historians, political scientists, and urban experts conducted by Melvin G. Holli of the University of Illinois Chicago ranked Quincy as the tenth-best American big-city mayor to have served between the years 1820 and 1993.

In 1829, Quincy was elected as a member to the American Philosophical Society.

=== 15th President of Harvard University ===
Portrait by William Page, c. 1843

From 1829 to 1845, he was President of Harvard University. He had been an overseer of the university since 1810, when the board was reorganized. At a time when college presidents were chosen for their intellectual achievements, Quincy's past experience as a politician and not an academic made him an unusual choice. He has been called "the great organizer of the university." He gave an elective (or "voluntary") system an elaborate trial; introduced a system of marking (on the scale of 8) on which college rank and honors, formerly rather carelessly assigned, were based; first used courts of law to punish students who destroyed or damaged college property; and helped to reform the finances of the university. During his term Dane Hall (for law) was dedicated, Gore Hall was built, and the Astronomical Observatory was equipped. Quincy House, one of the university's twelve upperclass residential houses, is named for him.

In 1856, Quincy gave an address concerning the then upcoming American presidential election. Quincy endorsed the Republican candidate, John C. Fremont, and denounced how "for more than fifty years, the Slave States have subjugated the Free States." This speech is cited in Negro President: Jefferson and the Slave Power, by Garry Wills.

== Personal life ==
In 1797, Quincy married Eliza Susan Morton of New York City, the younger sister of Jacob Morton. They had seven children: Eliza Susan Quincy, Josiah Quincy Jr., Abigail Phillips Quincy, Maria Sophia Quincy, Margaret Morton Quincy, Edmund Quincy, and Anna Cabot Lowell Quincy.

== Death ==
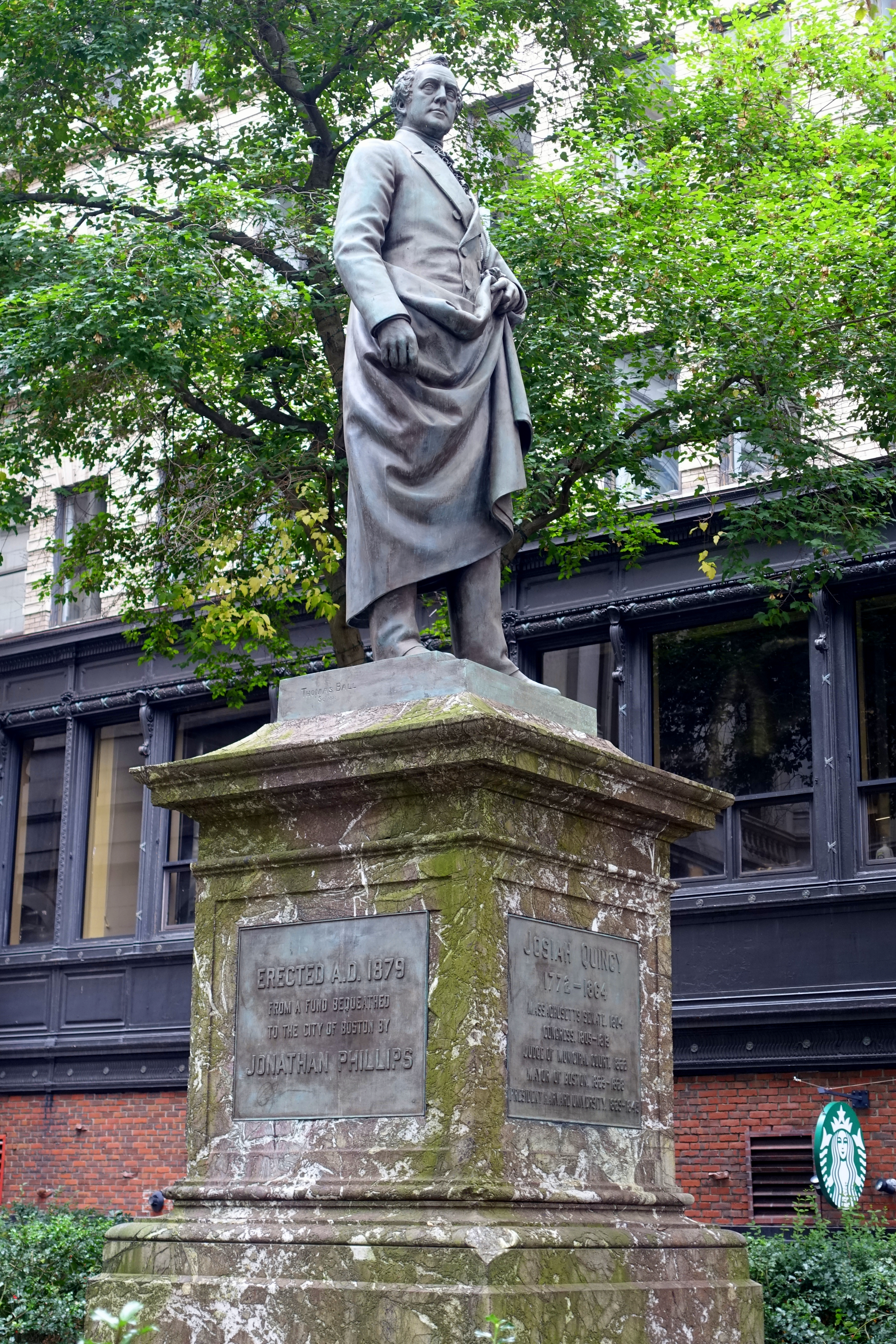
Statue of Josiah Quincy III

Quincy spent his final years principally on his farm in Quincy, Massachusetts, where he died on July 1, 1864.

== Works ==
- A Municipal History of the Town and City of Boston During Two Centuries from September 17, 1630 to September 17, 1830, Boston: Charles C. Little & James Brown, 1852.
- History of Harvard University. Cambridge, Massachusetts, 1840.
- The History of the Boston Athenæum, with Biographical Notices of its Deceased Founders. Cambridge, Massachusetts., Metcalf and Company, 1851.
- Essay on the Soiling of Cattle. 1852.
- Address Illustrative of the Nature and Power of the Slave States and the Duties of the Free States (Ticknor and Fields, 1856)
- The Duty of Conservative Whigs in the Present Crisis: A Letter to the Hon. Rufus Choate, Boston: William A. Hall, 1856.

== See also ==
- Statue of Josiah Quincy III in Boston
- Timeline of Boston in the 1820s

== Notes and references ==
Attribution:

U.S. House of Representatives
Preceded by William Eustis	Member of the U.S. House of Representatives from Massachusetts's 1st congressional district March 4, 1805 – March 3, 1813	Succeeded by Artemas Ward Jr.
Political offices
Preceded by Elijah H. Mills	Speaker of the Massachusetts House of Representatives; 1821–1822	Succeeded by Luther Lawrence
Preceded by John Phillips	2nd Mayor of Boston, Massachusetts; May 1, 1823 – January 5, 1829	Succeeded by Harrison Gray Otis
Preceded by John Thornton Kirkland	16th President of Harvard University; 1829–1846	Succeeded by Edward Everett
