= 1823 Boston mayoral election =

Election in Massachusetts, United States

- April 14, 1823
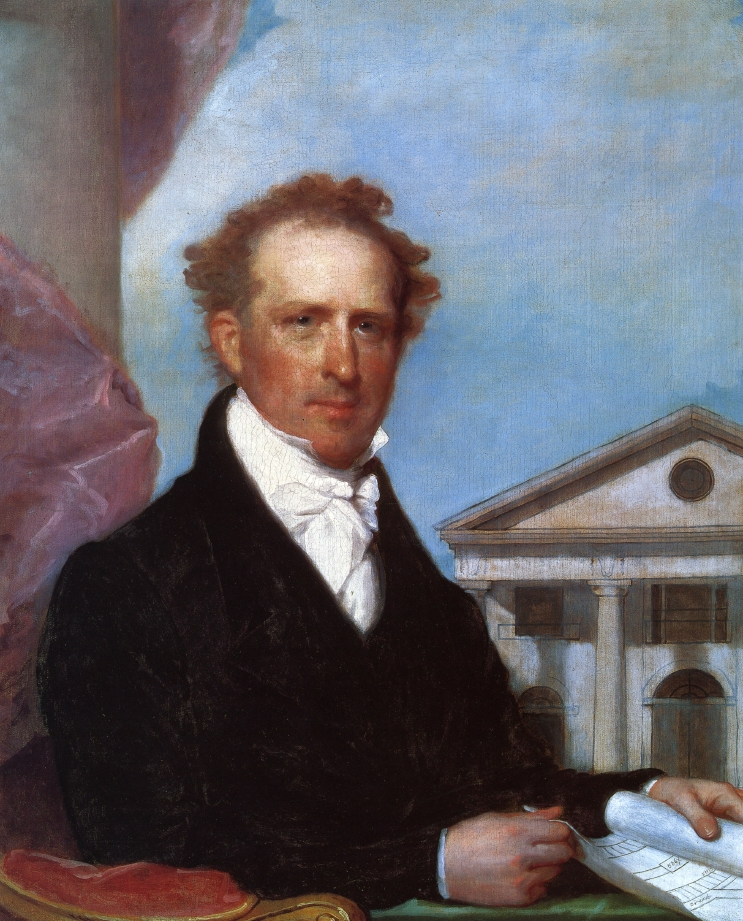

Candidate	Josiah Quincy III	George Blake
Popular vote	2,505	2,180
Percentage	52.56%	45.74%
Mayor before election
John Pillips
Elected mayor
Josiah Quincy III
Federalist

The 1823 Boston mayoral election saw the election of Josiah Quincy III. It was held on April 14, 1823. His opponent was George Blake, the U.S. district attorney for District of Massachusetts.

== Results ==
1823 Boston mayoral election
Candidate	Votes	%
Josiah Quincy III (incumbent)	2,505	52.56
George Blake	2,180	45.74
Scattering	81	1.70
Total votes	4,766	100

== See also ==
- List of mayors of Boston, Massachusetts
