= Boston Renaissance Charter Public School =

Location
- 1415 Hyde Park Avenue; Hyde Park, Massachusetts; United States; 42°15′02″N 71°07′37″W

Information
- Type: Charter
- Established: 1995
- Grades: K-6 (formerly K–8)
- Website: www.bostonrenaissance.org

Boston Renaissance Charter Public School (BRCPS), formerly Boston Renaissance Charter School (BRCS), is a charter elementary school in Hyde Park, Boston, Massachusetts. It is one of the oldest charter schools in Boston, and as of 2012 BRCPS was also one of the largest charter schools in the city. In 2001 it was the largest American charter school that operated out of a single campus, and in 2005 it was the largest charter school in the state of Massachusetts. Overall it was one of the largest charter schools in the United States. It formerly served middle school grades but now only serves elementary school.

== History ==
The school first opened in 1995; the State of Massachusetts allowed the formation of charter schools in 1993. It was co-founded by several area figures, including the former Horace Mann Foundation executive director, Dr. Robert Gaudet. Its initial location was in Downtown Boston. Edison Schools (now EdisonLearning) operated the school by contract. In its first year it had 637 students in elementary grades. The school administration hoped to have the student body increase up to 1,265 students. Edison Schools hoped to establish a model school so that it could repeat this model in other parts of the U.S. The school administration envisioned that the school would cover grades Kindergarten through 12.

In its first year of operation, the school did not receive special education records for students transferring from Boston Public Schools (BPS) campuses until several months into the year as the school district was late in transferring them. In 1997 a group of teachers accused the school of trying to discourage special needs students from enrolling. Edison Schools stated that special needs students were not being discouraged from enrolling, and that excluding special needs students went against Edison policies. Around 1997 some parents of special education children intentionally did not state their children's statuses so that the kids would not have stigma attached to them. The parents of a child complained to the Massachusetts Advocacy Center stating that they were not notified that their disabled child was transferred out of a classroom; the school administration had resolved the scenario by allowing his school day to be finished at 12 noon. The Office for Civil Rights of the federal government examined the situation and, in 1997, placed the school's special education program under federal government oversight. Chester E. Finn Jr., Bruno V. Manno, and Gregg Vanourek, the authors of Charter Schools in Action: Renewing Public Education, argued that this was a "troublesome precedent".

A summer 1998 article from the think tank magazine City Journal praised the school. The article praised the school's school day length, merit pay, and teacher accountability systems. By 1998 the student population was 1,080, and there were 2,000 families with children on a waiting list.

On July 1, 1998, Roger Harris, formerly principal of Timilty Middle School in Roxbury, became the BRCPS principal.

In 2000 the school signed another five-year contract with Edison. However the school cancelled this arrangement in 2002. The school administration and the company stated that the decline in test scores was not the reason for the termination of the relationship.

By 2005 the school had grades K-8 and had 1,300 students.

It moved into its current Hyde Park location in 2010. The move was mandated by the conditions of the State of Massachusetts' academic probation against the school.

== Operations ==
In 1996 the school had a strong emphasis on student discipline. As of that year the school has individualized "learning assessments" for each student and places less emphasis on letter grades. The school issued computers to students for homework purposes.

In 1996 most students wore optional school uniforms. As of 2017 the uniform is mandatory for students, and consists of polo shirts with the school logo, navy bottoms, and school-branded sweat suits.

As of 1998 the school has longer school years and school days than most area schools, meeting 200 days per year. As of 1998 this was about 30 days more than the Boston Public Schools (BPS) academic calendar. Each instructional day lasted about eight hours per day, which as of 1996 was one and one half hours longer than the instructional days of most area schools.

As of 1998 it received a per-pupil amount of money from the Boston city government, but could not spend it on its physical plant; this amount was the same as that given to BPS schools.

== Student body ==
As of 2015 the school had about 915 students: 65% were black, 30% were Hispanic or Latino, 2% each were multiracial and White, and 1% were Asian. 82% of the students were low income. As of that year it was the largest public elementary school in Boston.

In 1996, and in 2005, over 50% of the students were on a free or reduced lunch programs. The student body was majority-minority in 1996. In 1998, 1% of the students were classified as having severe disabilities and 12% of the students were classified as special education; these percentages were below the Boston citywide averages.

== Campus ==
Its 41 classroom facility is a former factory in Hyde Park; it was renovated and expanded by Suffolk Construction Co. in 2009 and 2010. The building includes a gymnasium, a dance studio, a playground, a combination auditorium and cafeteria, and additional athletic facilities.

Its initial location was a 15-story, office building, within the Park Square area of Downtown Boston. This building was previously owned by the University of Massachusetts Boston. At the time of the school's establishment the building was unoccupied. The State of Massachusetts helped Boston Renaissance get a $12 million loan so the building could get necessary repairs. When the school was in operation the state government charged the school a rent rate that was below the area market value. In 1996 the school used around twelve floors in the building. It did not have an auditorium, a cafeteria, nor a gymnasium.

== Curriculum ==
Upon its establishment, the school's intended specialties were foreign languages and computer skills.

In 2001 the school employed 14 teachers who specialized in physical education, Spanish, and various visual and performing arts. Tess Mullen of the Harvard Political Review stated that the school's arts curriculum was "strong".

In 2009 the school began a Chinese culture and language program at the Kindergarten 1 level, with 88 students initially partaking in the program. Expansion was to occur by one grade level each year. The program was implemented schoolwide by 2015.

== Academic performance ==
In 2001 the school's Massachusetts state achievement test scores were under the statewide average. In the following year, about 73% of the students passed the state English test and 31% of the students passed the state mathematics test.

In 2007 the State of Massachusetts placed the school on academic probation; it asked the school to move to a new campus and to, by 2009, reduce the number of students to 880; at the time it had 1,240 students. In 2009 61% of the students were classified as proficient or higher in the English portion of the Massachusetts Comprehensive Assessment System (MCAS) test, and 54% were classified as proficient or higher in MCAS mathematics test. The probation ended in December 2010. In the Spring of 2012, 53% of the school's students scored proficient of higher in the MCAS English test, and 36% scored proficient or higher in the MCAS mathematics test. In 2013 the Massachusetts Board of Elementary and Secondary Education voted 7 to 1 to place the school on academic probation, meaning that the school must improve in a two-year period.

Boston Renaissance Charter Public School: Mission, Programs, and Services for Student Development

The Boston Renaissance Charter Public School (BRCPS) emphasizes fostering academic, social, and emotional growth in students while promoting their development as responsible and confident individuals. The school’s mission revolves around nurturing character, citizenship, and confidence, alongside academic skills. A core aspect of their educational approach is the focus on "whole-child education," which integrates various services and programs to meet the needs of each student, including special education and English Language Education

BRCPS also provides various enrichment activities, including arts and specialty classes, to support a well-rounded education. The school encourages family involvement through resources such as mental health support and comprehensive student services. You can learn more about the school’s offerings by exploring their website
