= Downtown Boston =

Area of Boston, Massachusetts

Coordinates: 42°21′00″N 71°04′00″W

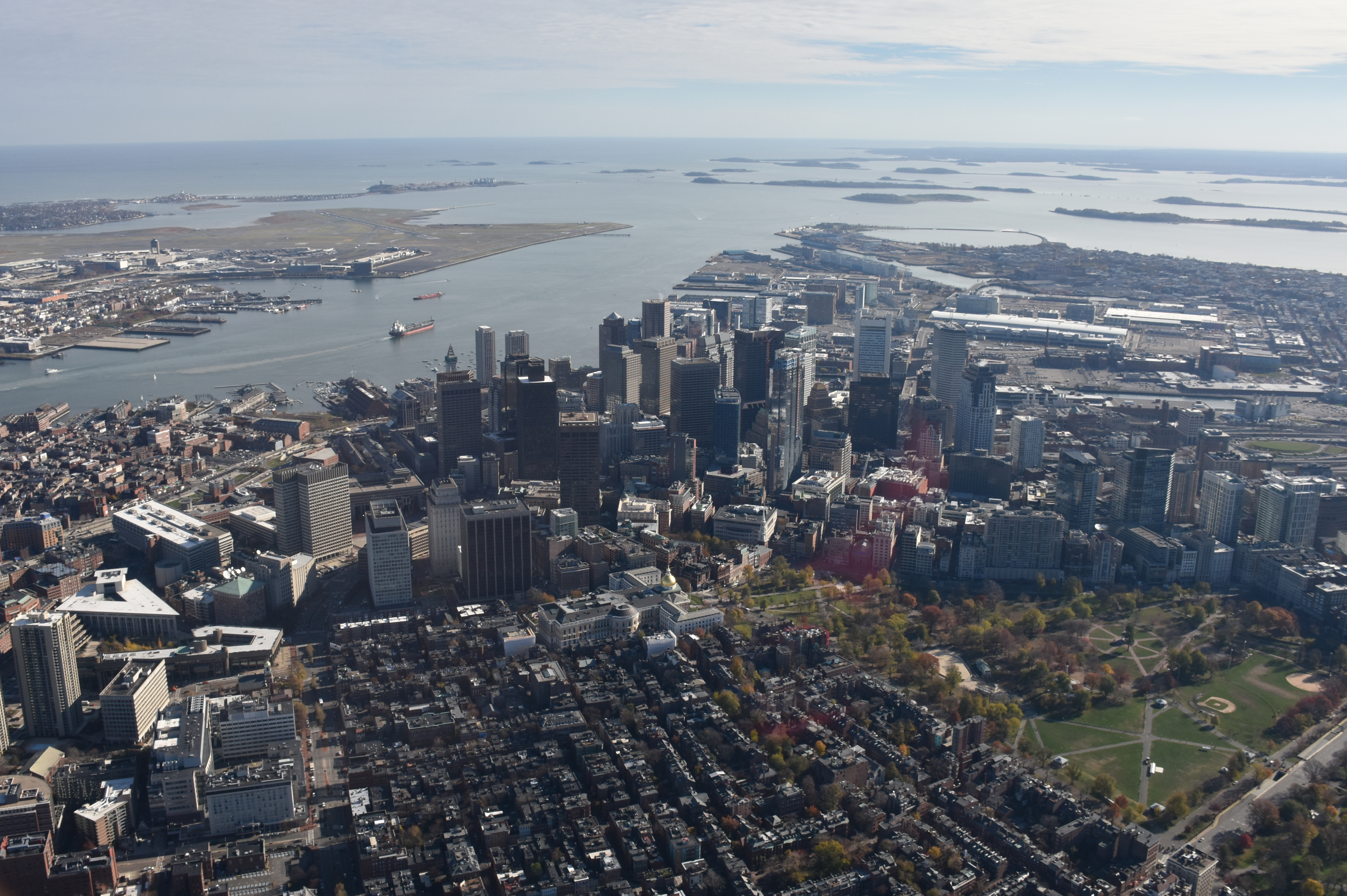
Aerial view of Downtown Boston in November 2015

Downtown Boston is the central business district of Boston, Massachusetts, United States. Boston was founded in 1630. The largest of the city's commercial districts, Downtown is the location of many corporate or regional headquarters; city, county, state and federal government facilities; and many of Boston's tourist attractions. Similar to other central business districts in the U.S., Downtown has recently undergone a transformation that included the construction of new condos and lofts, renovation of historic buildings, and arrival of new residents and businesses. It is represented in the Boston City Council by District 2's Ed Flynn.

Downtown is bound by the Back Bay, North End, Beacon Hill, and the South End areas. It includes the Government Center and the Financial District.

The area that is now Downtown Boston constituted much of the town/city proper prior to the city's dramatic expansion in the 1860s and 1870s. The Great Boston Fire of 1872 destroyed much of the neighborhood, especially between Summer, Washington, and Milk Streets. In the 1950s the Central Artery highway began operating, until the Big Dig (1982–2007) relocated it underground. In the 1960s and 1970s the enormous new Government Center complex replaced Scollay Square.

Landmarks in Downtown Boston include the Greenway, Custom House Tower, City Hall, Faneuil Hall, Quincy Market, Old State House, Old South Meeting House, Massachusetts State House, Park Street Church, Boston Common, and Boston Public Garden.

Educational institutions located downtown include Emerson College and Suffolk University.

The four MBTA subway lines converge in the downtown area at the Downtown Crossing, Park Street, Government Center, and State stations. South Station is a transportation hub with subway, commuter rail, intercity bus, and Amtrak service.

== Education ==
Boston Public Schools operates area district public schools.

Boston Renaissance Charter Public School was formerly located in a building in Park Square. In 2010 it moved to its current location in Hyde Park.

== See also ==
- Financial District, Boston
- List of tallest buildings in Boston (many downtown)
