= Equestrian statue of George Washington (Boston) =

Equestrian statue of George Washington by Thomas Ball in Boston, Massachusetts, U.S.

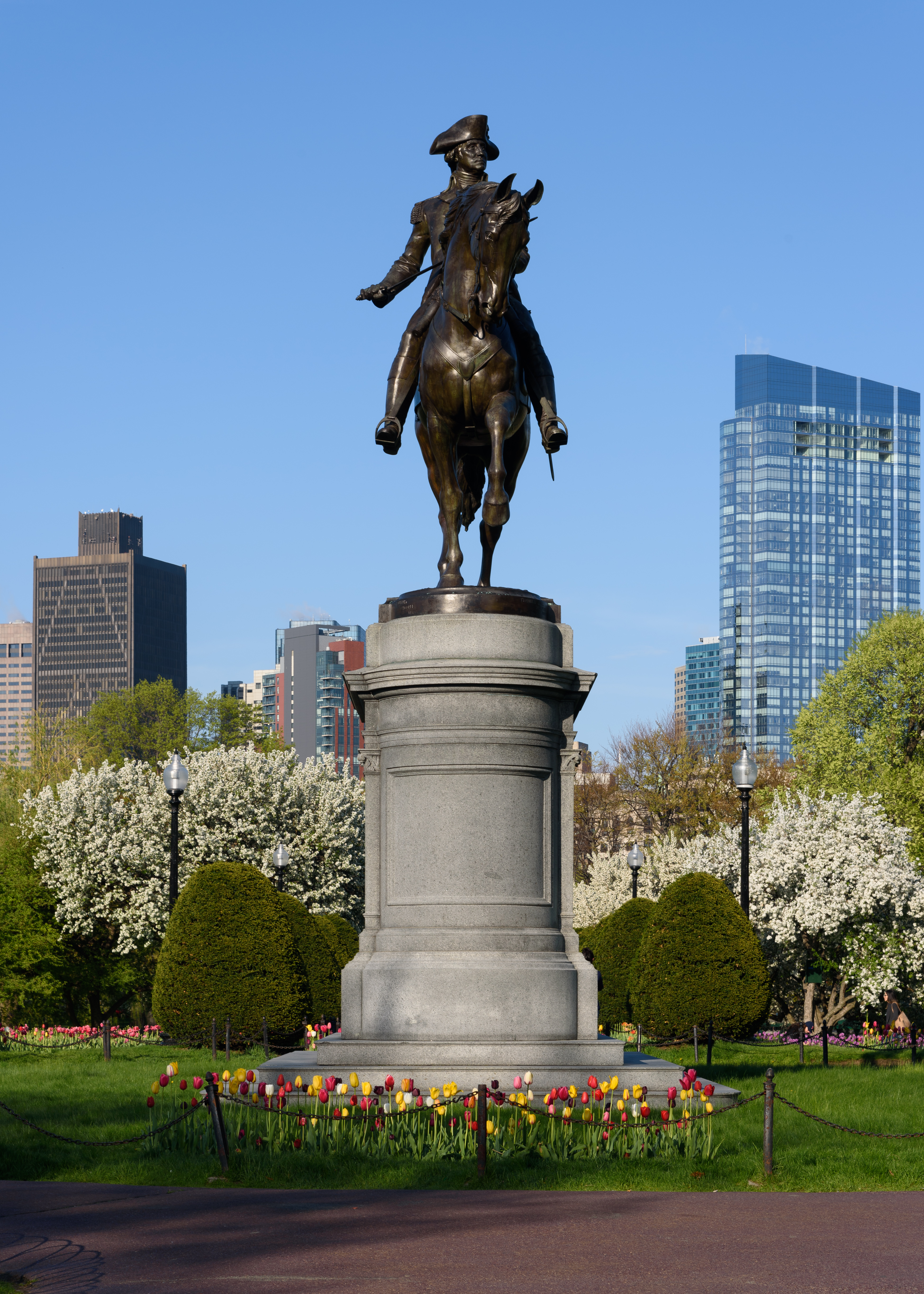
- The statue in 2018
- Artist: Thomas Ball
- Year: 1869
- Medium: Bronze sculpture
- Subject: George Washington
- Location: Boston, Massachusetts, U.S.; 42°21′13.9″N 71°4′15.4″W

An equestrian statue of George Washington by Thomas Ball is installed in Boston's Public Garden, in the U.S. state of Massachusetts.

== Description and history ==
The sculpture was commissioned in 1859, modeled in 1864, and cast and dedicated in 1869. The bronze measures approximately 22 x 6 x 15 ft, and rests on a granite base that measures approximately 16 x 8 x 15 ft. It was surveyed by the Smithsonian Institution's "Save Outdoor Sculpture!" program in 1993.

The monument was conceived in an effort to present Massachusetts as an artistic center. The chairman of the fundraising committee for the monument, Alexander H. Rice, declared in a speech from 1859:

This statue shall exhibit the resources of our own State in the production of works of its class. The artist is a citizen of Boston; the statue will be modeled here; it will also be cast in bronze at some one of the foundries of Massachusetts, and it is expected that abundant funds for defraying its cost will flow from the generosity of our own people.

Over the years, the statue's sword has repeatedly been broken and stolen; to avoid continually recasting a bronze replacement, caretakers installed a fiberglass substitute.

== See also ==
- List of sculptures of presidents of the United States
- List of statues of George Washington
