= Thomas Ball (artist) =

American sculptor and musician (1819–1911)

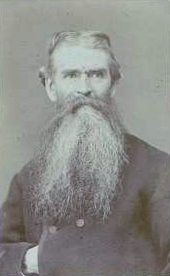
- Born: June 3, 1819; Charlestown, Massachusetts, U.S.
- Died: December 11, 1911 (aged 92); Montclair, New Jersey, U.S.
- Known for: Sculpture

Thomas Ball (June 3, 1819 – December 11, 1911) was an American sculptor and musician. His work has had a marked influence on monumental art in the United States, especially in New England.

== Early life ==
He was born in Charlestown, Massachusetts, to Thomas Ball, a house and sign painter, and Elizabeth Wyer Hall. His father died when he was twelve.

== Career ==
After several odd jobs to help support his family, he spent three years working at the New England Museum, the precursor to the Boston Museum. There, he entertained the visitors by drawing portraits, playing the violin, singing, and repairing mechanical toys. He then became an apprentice for the museum wood-carver Abel Brown. He taught himself oil painting by copying prints and casts in the studio of the museum superintendent.

His earliest work was a bust of Jenny Lind, whom he saw on her 1850 tour of the United States. Copies of his Lind work and his bust of Daniel Webster sold widely before being widely copied by others. His work includes many early cabinet busts of musicians. His first statue of a figure was a two-foot high statue of Daniel Webster, on which he worked from photographs and engravings until he managed to see him pass his studio shortly before his death. At thirty-five, in 1854, he travelled to Florence to study.

=== Musician ===
Ball was an accomplished musician from his teenage years, working as a paid singer in Boston churches. He performed as an unpaid soloist with the Handel and Haydn Society beginning in 1846 and with that organization, sang the title role in the first United States performance of Mendelssohn's Elijah, and the baritone solos in Rossini's Moses in Egypt. On a visit to Boston years later, he performed the baritone role in Boston's first performance of Beethoven's Ninth Symphony with the Germania Orchestra on April 2, 1853.

=== Painter ===
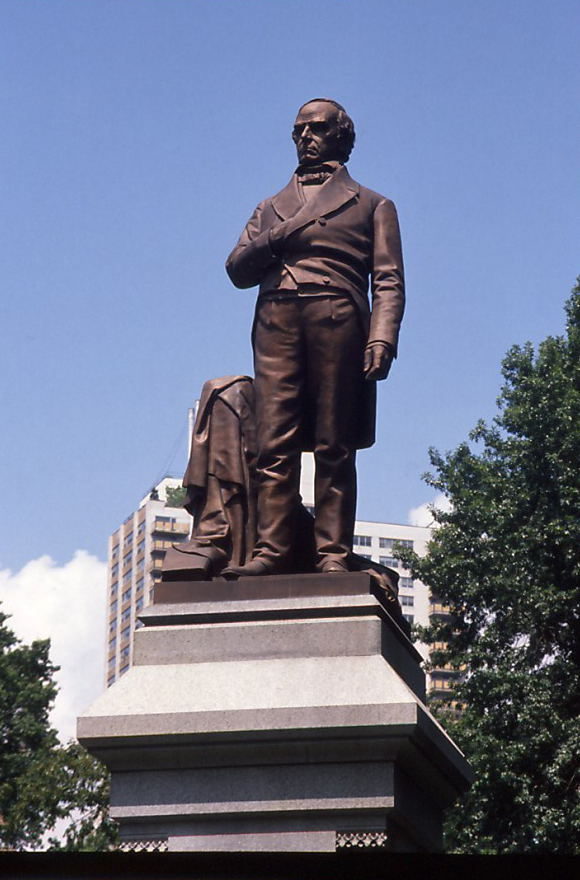
Daniel Webster (1868), Central Park, New York City.

As commissions started to come in, he moved from studio to studio until he settled in a studio in Tremont Row in Boston, where he remained for twelve years. There, he painted several religious pictures and a portrait of Cornelia Wells (Walter) Richards, editor of the Boston Evening Transcript. He then turned his attention back to sculpture.

=== Sculptor ===
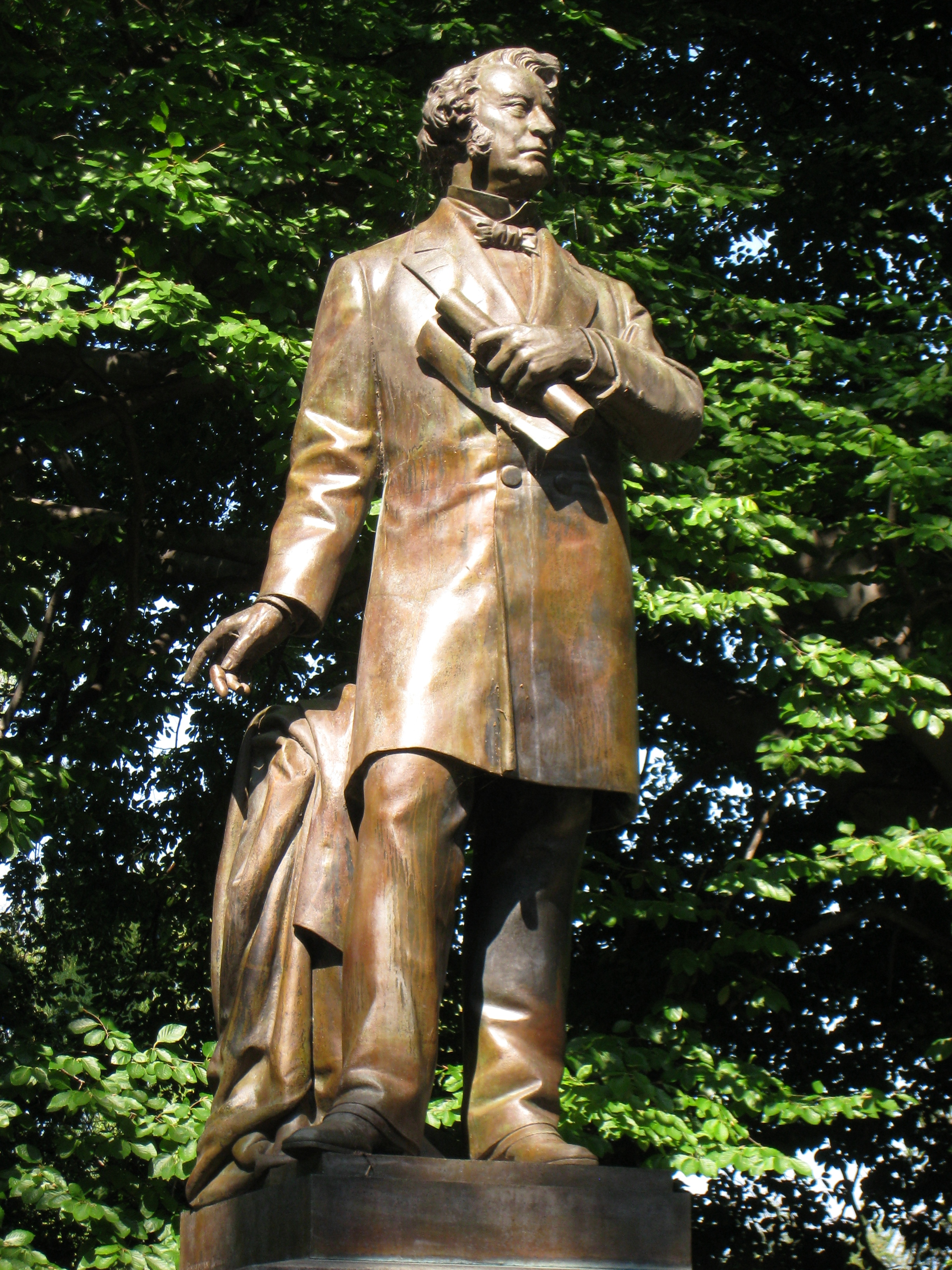
Charles Sumner (1878), The Public Garden, Boston, Massachusetts.

He stayed in Boston until 1865 when he returned to Florence to stay there until 1897 as a member of an artistic colony that included Robert and Elizabeth Barrett Browning and Hiram Powers. Notables he met in Europe included Franz Liszt, whom he met at the Vatican in 1865 and of whom he produced a portrait bust.

He made it a practice never to attend the unveiling of his public works. In Boston, he managed to avoid receiving the invitation to the ceremonial dedication of his statue of Governor John Albion Andrew. Instead, he saw the work later, viewing it from different angles. He later wrote: "It was a mean thing to do. I am ashamed of it now, but I could not bring myself to stand on that platform and face the multitude."

Dartmouth College awarded him an honorary Master of Arts degree. When he returned to America, he lived in Montclair, New Jersey, while keeping a studio in New York City.

In 1880, Ball published an autobiographical volume, My Threescore Years, which he updated in 1890 as My Three Score Years and Ten. He died at the Montclair home of his daughter, Eliza Chickering Ball, and son-in-law, sculptor William Couper.

== Selected works ==
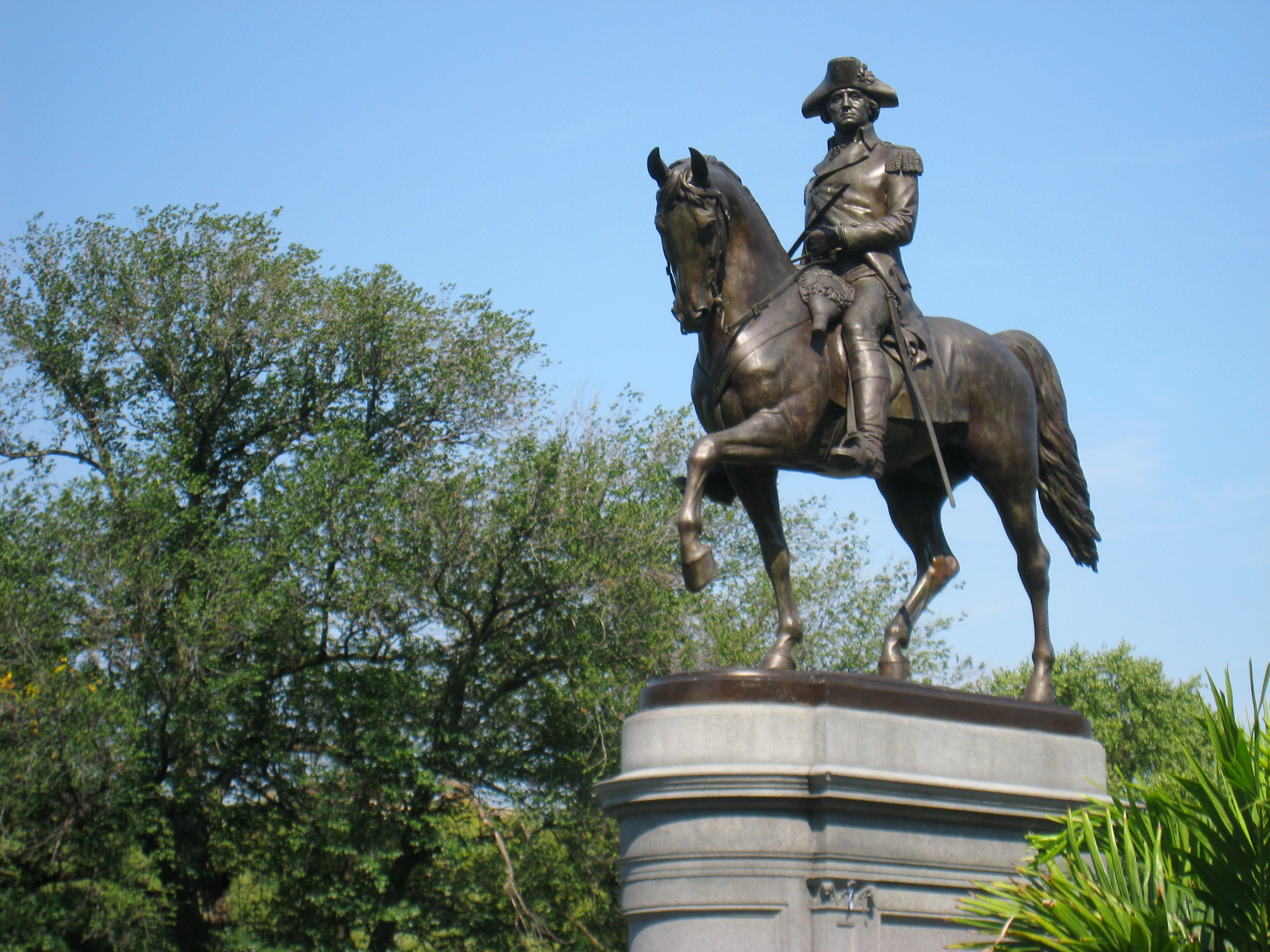
George Washington (1864), The Public Garden, Boston, Massachusetts.

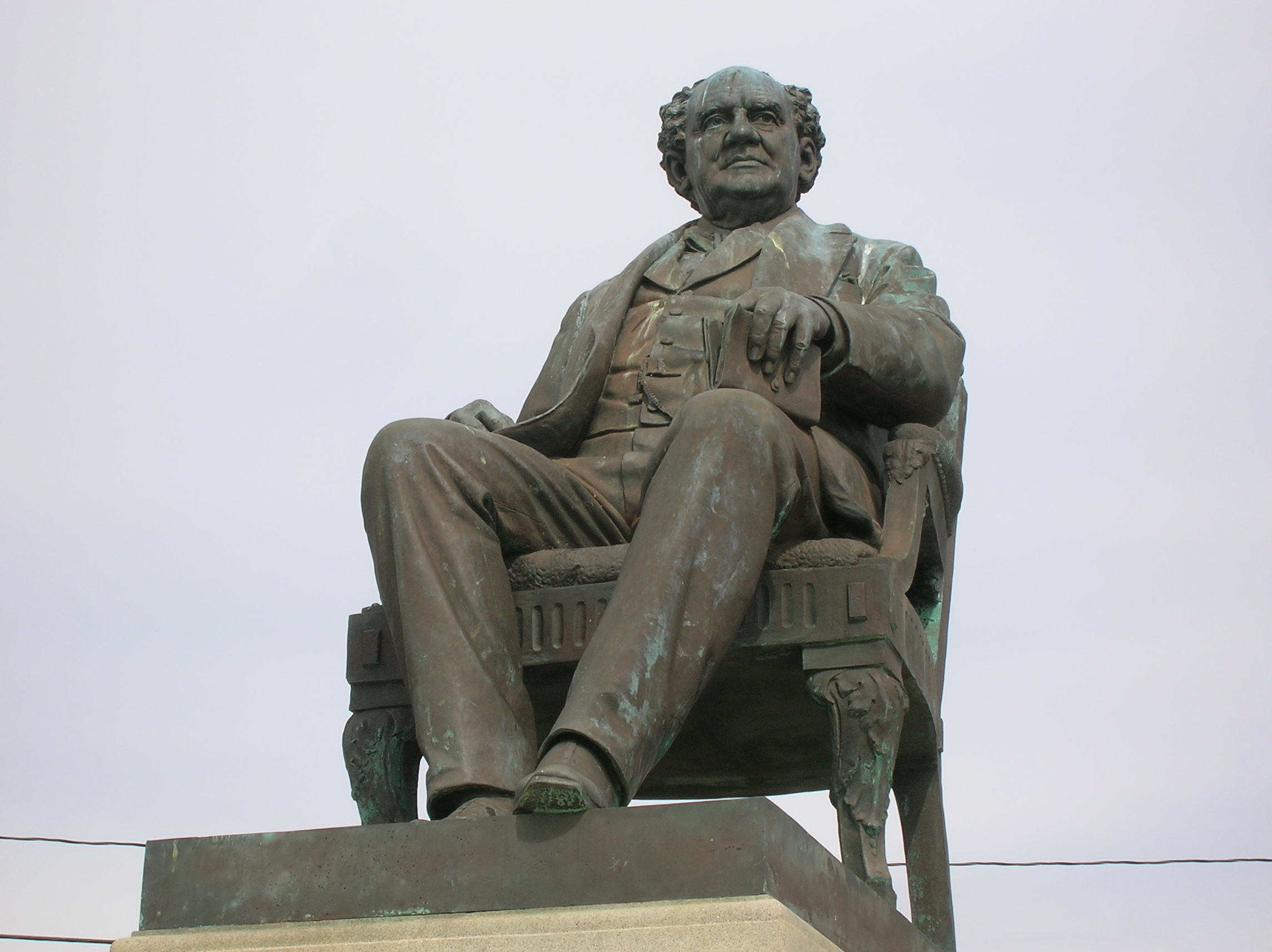
P. T. Barnum (1887), Seaside Park, Bridgeport, Connecticut.

- Bust of Jenny Lind (plaster, 1851), New York Historical Society, New York City.
- Bust of Daniel Webster (bronze), Hood Museum of Art, Dartmouth College, Hanover, New Hampshire.
- Statuette of Daniel Webster (bronze, 1853).
- Four bas-relief panels (bronze, 1856), on base of Richard Saltonstall Greenough's Benjamin Franklin statue, Old City Hall, Boston, Massachusetts.
- Statuette of Henry Clay (bronze, 1858), U.S. Senate Art Collection, U.S. Capitol, Washington, D.C.
- Daniel Webster (bronze, 1860–1868), Central Park, New York City.
- Equestrian Statue of George Washington (bronze, 1864), Boston Public Garden, Boston, Massachusetts.
  - The model for this statue is held by the Boston Athenaeum
- Bust of Edward Everett (marble, 1867), Boston Central Library, Boston, Massachusetts.
- Edwin Forrest as "Coriolanus" (marble, 1867), Walnut Street Theater, Philadelphia, Pennsylvania.
- Josiah Quincy (bronze, 1869), Old City Hall, Boston, Massachusetts.
- John Albion Andrew (marble, 1870), Doric Hall, Massachusetts State House, Boston, Massachusetts.
- "The Angel of Death Lifting the Veil from the Eyes of Faith" (Jonas Chickering Monument) (marble, 1872), Mount Auburn Cemetery, Cambridge, Massachusetts.
- Saint John the Evangelist (marble, 1875), Forest Hills Cemetery, Boston, Massachusetts. Replaced by a polymer replica, 2001.
  - Copies of this are in the Smithsonian American Art Museum, Washington, D.C.; the Chrysler Museum of Art, Norfolk, Virginia; and the Montclair Art Museum, Montclair, New Jersey.
- Emancipation Memorial (bronze, 1875), Lincoln Park, Washington, D.C.
  - A copy of this was in Park Square, Boston, Massachusetts.
- Charles Sumner (bronze, 1878), Boston Public Garden, Boston, Massachusetts.
- Daniel Webster (bronze, 1885–86), New Hampshire State House, Concord, New Hampshire. The commission was first given to sculptor Martin Milmore, then to his brother. Ball took it over following the deaths of both Milmores. This poses differently from his earlier Webster statues.
- P. T. Barnum (bronze, 1887), Seaside Park, Bridgeport, Connecticut.

=== Washington Monument ===
- George Washington Monument (1883–1893), Methuen, Massachusetts. This was Ball's most complex and ambitious work, consisting of a 15-foot bronze statue of Washington, four larger-than-life seated figures, four portrait busts, and four eagles flanked by flags, all displayed on a multi-tiered marble base. The monument was created at Ball's studio in Florence, Italy. His son-in-law, William Couper, assisted in modeling the figures. It was exhibited at the World's Columbian Exposition before being installed in Methuen, Massachusetts, and dedicated on February 22, 1900.
  - George Washington
  - Cincinnatus (seated figure of Washington)
  - Revolution (seated figure)
  - Oppression (seated figure)
  - Victory (seated figure)
  - Bust of the Marquis de LaFayette
  - Bust of General Henry Knox
  - Bust of General Nathaniel Greene
  - Bust of General Benjamin Lincoln
  - Four sets of Eagles and Flags

The monument was sold in 1958, disassembled, and moved to Forest Lawn Memorial Park, Hollywood Hills, California.

== Gallery ==
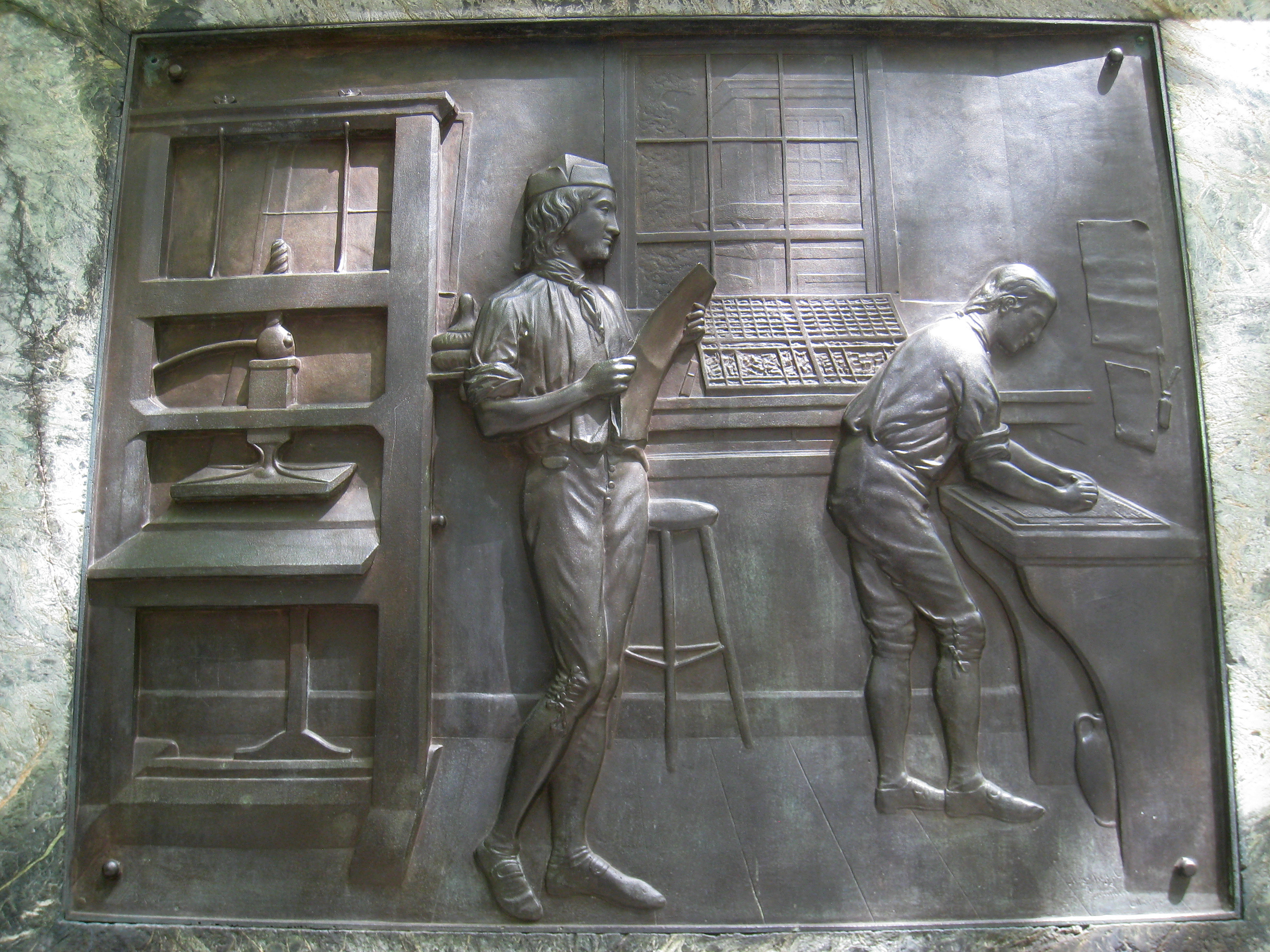
Benjamin Franklin, Printer (1856), Old City Hall, Boston, Massachusetts.

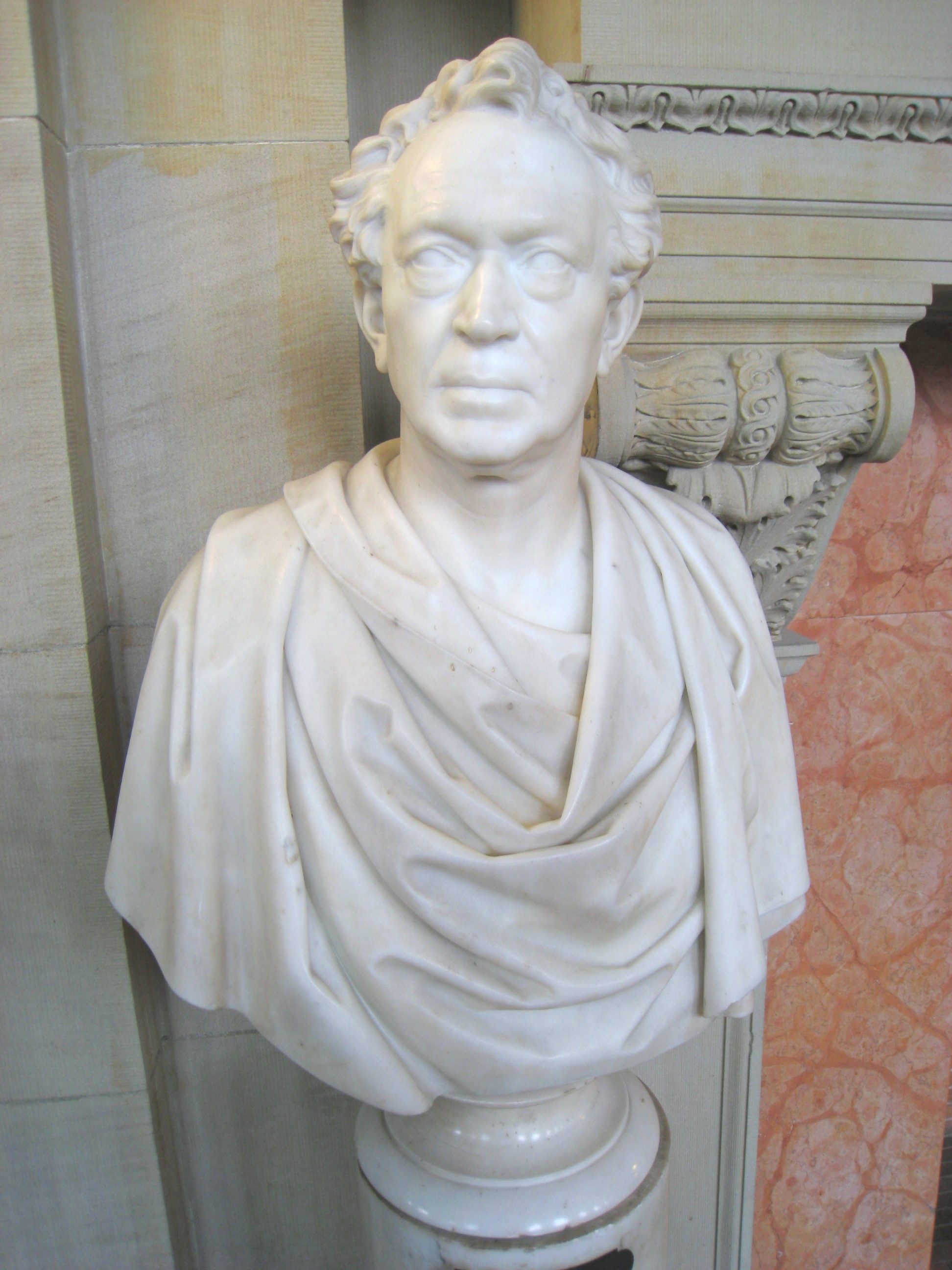
Edward Everett (1867), Boston Central Library, Boston, Massachusetts.

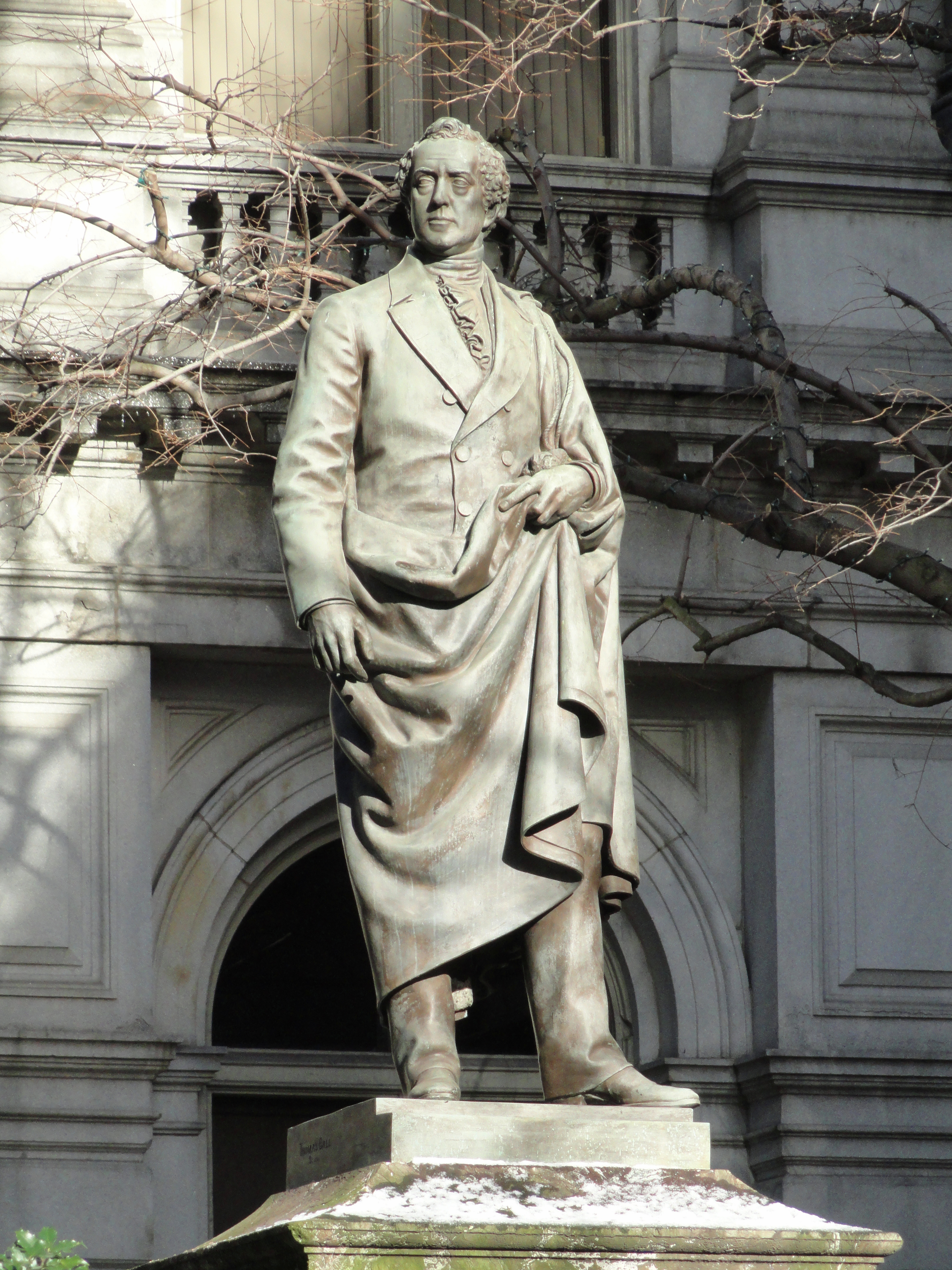
Josiah Quincy (1869), Old City Hall, Boston, Massachusetts.

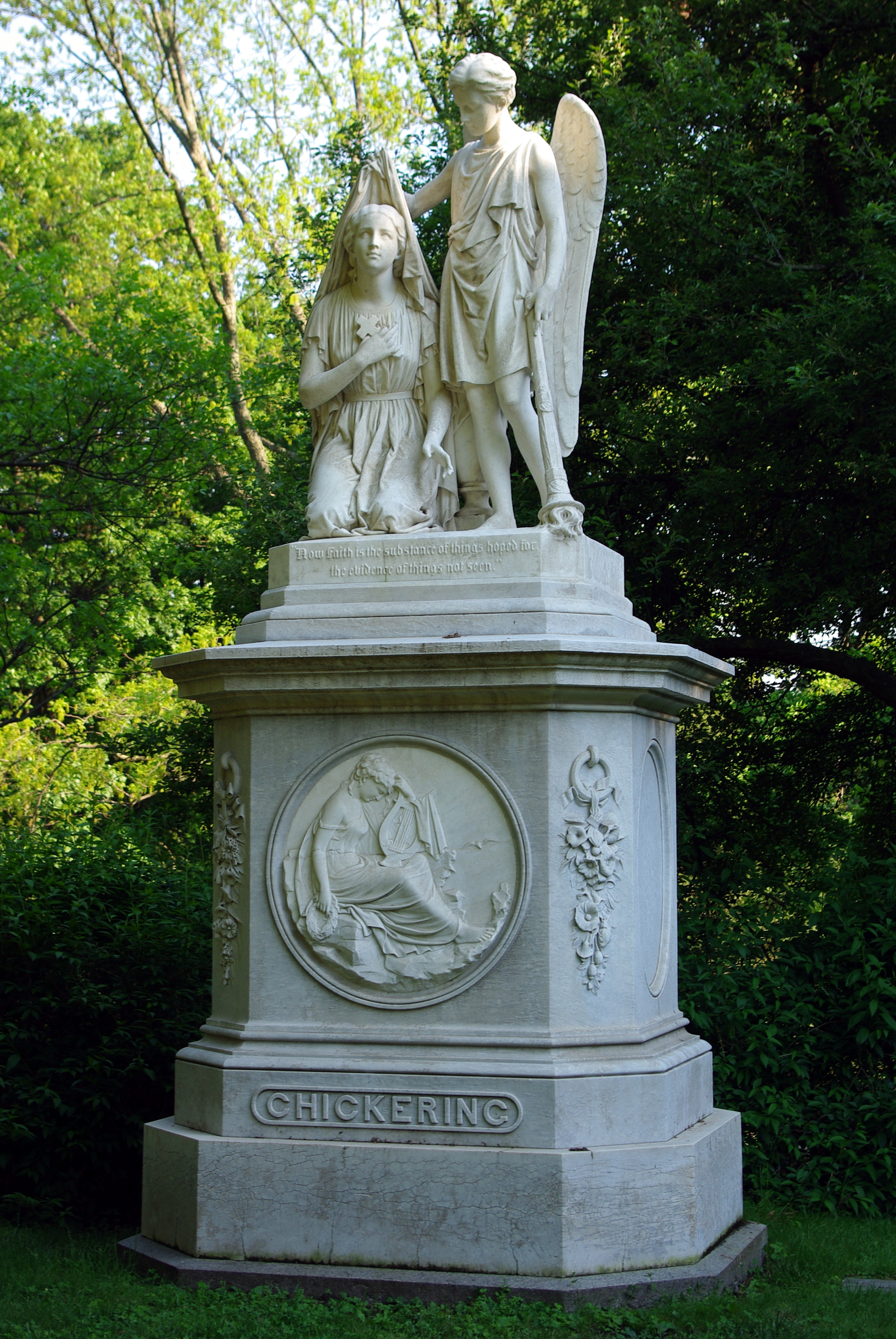
Jonas Chickering Monument (1872), Mount Auburn Cemetery, Cambridge, Massachusetts.

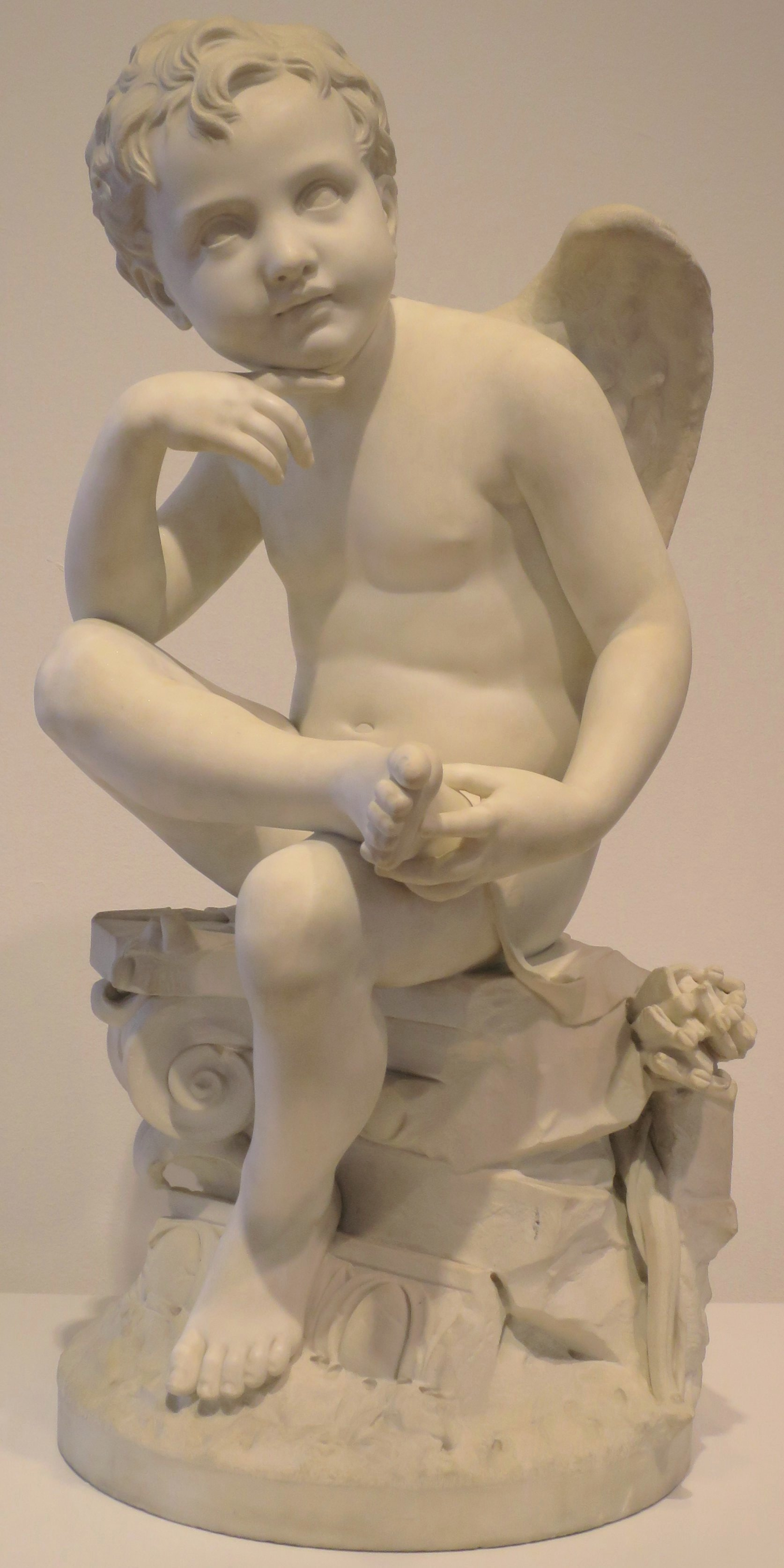
Love's Memories (1873), High Museum of Art, Atlanta, Georgia.

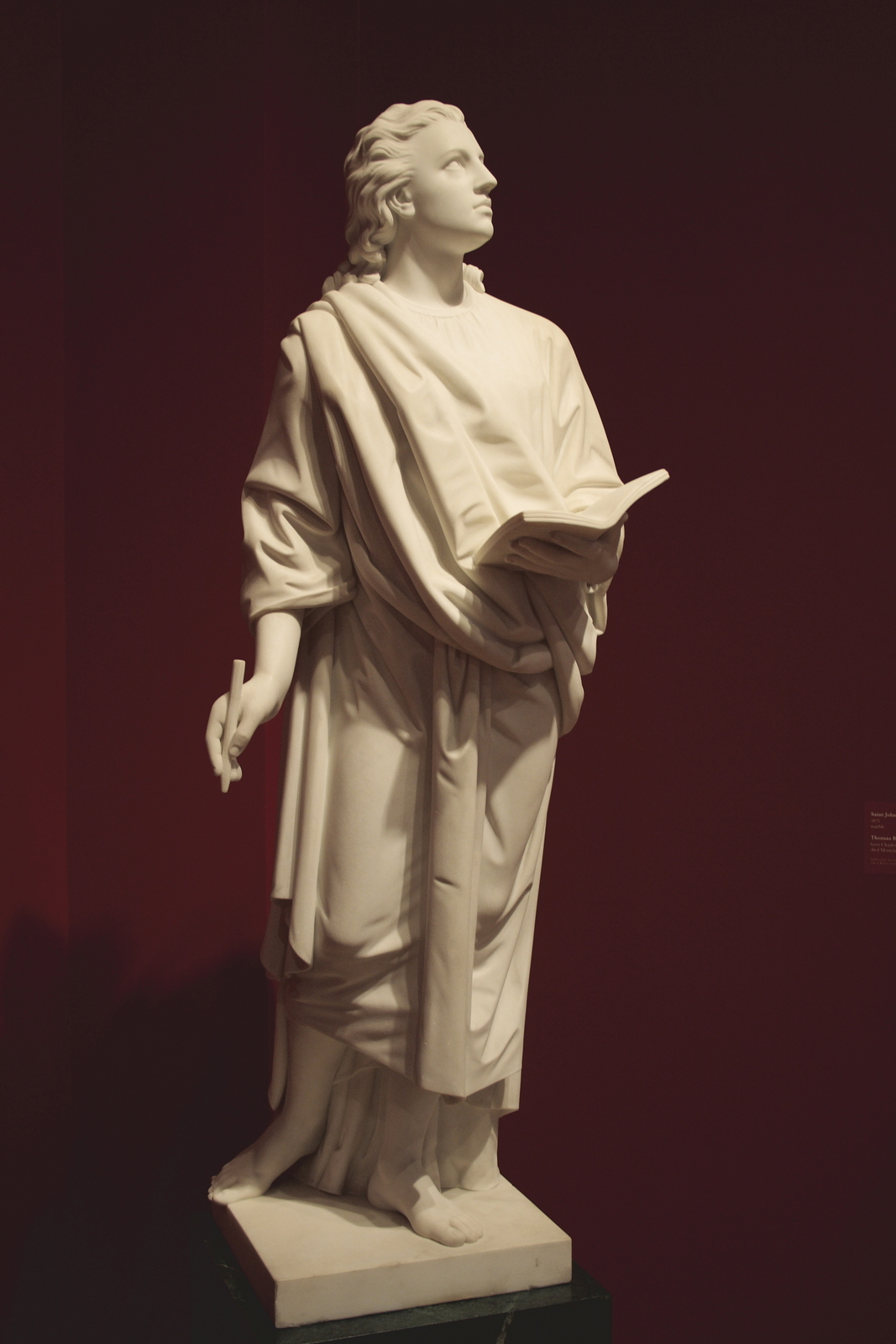
Saint John the Evangelist (1875), Smithsonian American Art Museum, Washington, D.C.

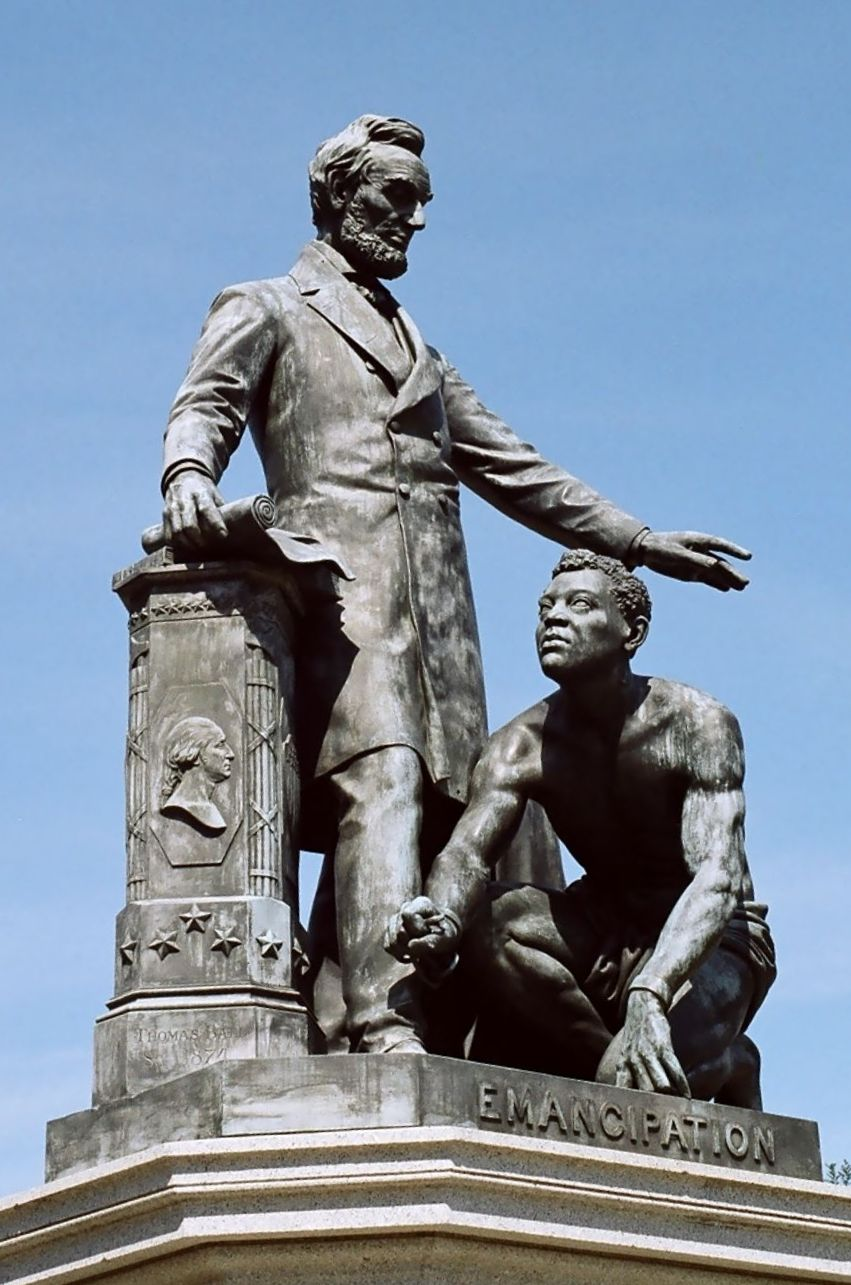
Emancipation Memorial (1875), Lincoln Park, Washington, D.C.

== Sources ==
- Taft, History of American Sculpture (New York, 1903)
- Nash, Edwin G., "Ball, Thomas" in Dictionary of American Biography, vol. 1 (NY: Charles Scribner's Sons, 1928)
- Thomas Ball, My Threescore Years And Ten: An Autobiography (Boston: Roberts Brothers, 1891)
- Thomas Ball, My Fourscore Years (Los Angeles: Trecavalli Press, 1993)
- http://www.wingedsun.com/books/ball.htm
