= Statue of Josiah Quincy III =

Statue in Boston, Massachusetts, U.S.

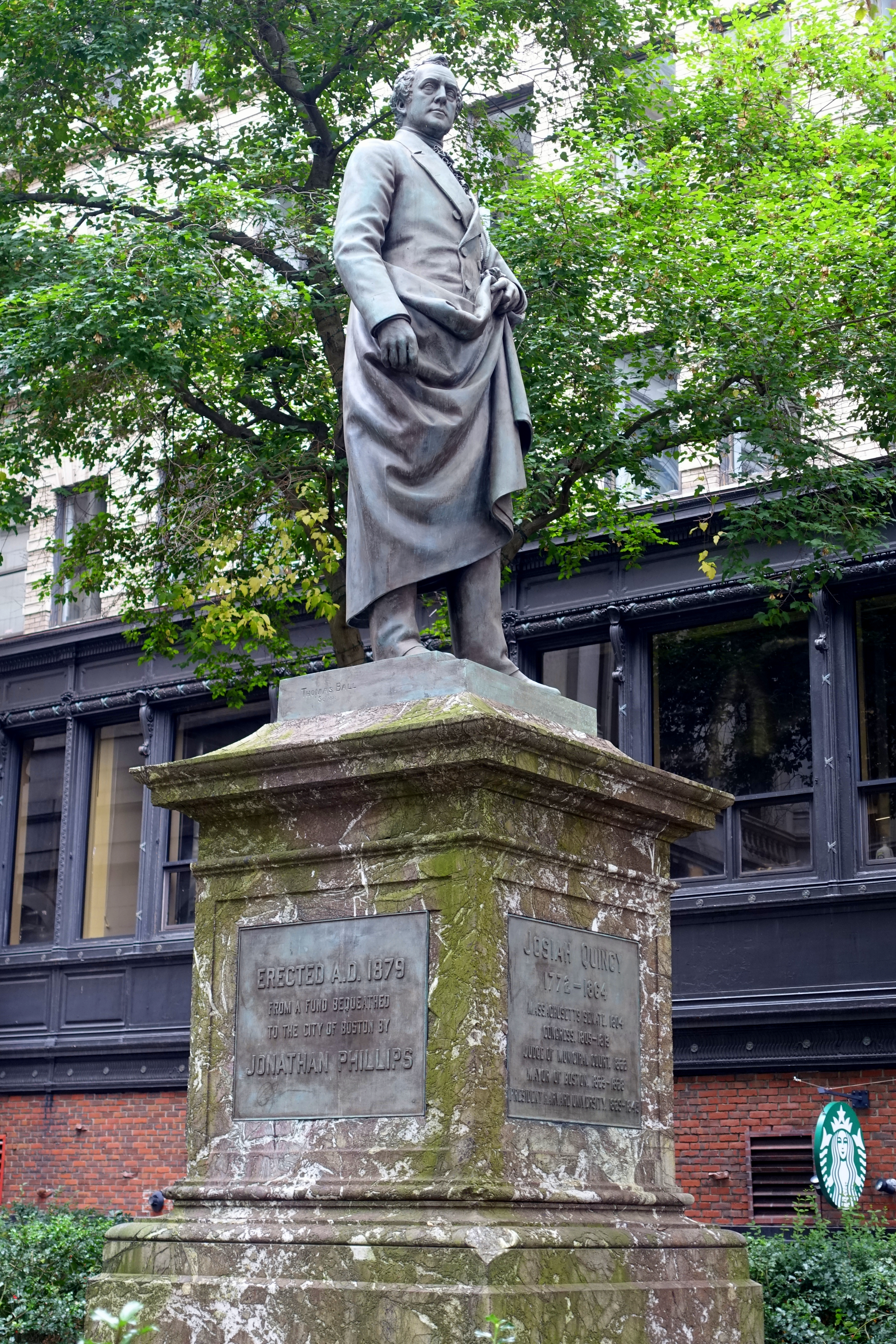
- The statue in 2018
- Artist: Thomas Ball
- Year: 1879
- Medium: Bronze sculpture
- Subject: Josiah Quincy III
- Location: Boston, Massachusetts, U.S.; 42°21′28.3″N 71°3′33.6″W

A statue of Josiah Quincy III by Thomas Ball (sometimes called Josiah Quincy) is installed outside Boston's Old City Hall, in the U.S. state of Massachusetts. The sculpture belongs to the City of Boston.

== Description ==
The larger than life bronze sculpture depicts Josiah Quincy III wearing a coat and cloak. It measures approximately 9 ft 4 in × 2 ft 8 in × 2 ft 8 in (2.84 m × 0.81 m × 0.81 m), and rests on a granite base that measures approximately 9 ft 6 in × 7 ft 7 in × 7 ft 7 in (2.90 m × 2.31 m × 2.31 m). One inscription on the front of the base reads: "JOSIAH QUINCY / 1778–1864 / MASSACHUSETTS SENATE, 1804 / CONGRESS, 1805–1813 / JUDGE OF MUNICIPAL COURT, 1822 / MAYOR OF BOSTON, 1823–1828 / PRESIDENT HARVARD UNIVERSITY, 1829–1845". Inscriptions on the sides of the base read "Erected A.D. 1879 from a fund bequeathed to the City of Boston by Jonathan Phillips", "T. Ball Sc. 1878", and "Gegossen durch FERD v. MILLER & SOHNE / Munchen 1879".

== History ==
The statue was modeled in 1878, cast in 1879, and dedicated on September 17 of that year. It cost approximately $18,000 and was installed using money from a trust fund established in 1860. Mayor Frederick O. Prince spoke at the statue's dedication ceremony.

The work was surveyed by the Smithsonian Institution's "Save Outdoor Sculpture!" program in 1993.

== See also ==
- 1879 in art
