= USS Malvern =

USS Malvern may refer to the following ships of the United States Navy:

- USS Malvern (1860) was built in 1860 as William G. Hewes and served the Union Navy
- USS Malvern (SP-3055) was a tug commissioned 27 April 1917 and returned to her owner On 16 January 1919
- USS Malvern (IX-138) was acquired by the U.S. Navy 11 May 1944 and decommissioned 16 February 1946
- USS Malvern (PC-580) was commissioned 26 September 1942 and transferred to Indonesia 17 March 1960
