= Park Square (Boston) =

Square in Boston, Massachusetts

Coordinates: 42.3516°N 71.0684°W

Location of Park Square in downtown Boston

Park Square in downtown Boston, Massachusetts, is bounded by Stuart, Charles Street South, Boylston, and Arlington Streets.

== Description ==
Park Square is the home of the Boston Four Seasons Hotel, the Boston Park Plaza, and nearly a dozen restaurants. To the north across Boylston Street is the Boston Public Garden. To the east is the Washington Street Theatre District. The Bay Village neighborhood is to the south, and Back Bay is to the west.

At one time, the terminus of the Boston and Providence Railroad was in the square; however, after South Station opened, the terminal was closed.

The Emancipation Memorial, commemorating the emancipation of American slaves, was installed in Park Square in 1879 and removed in December 2020.

A small street in the district was renamed "Park Plaice" (plaice being a type of flatfish) in honor of Legal Sea Foods, a local restaurant.

== Education ==
Boston Public Schools operates area district public schools.

Boston Renaissance Charter Public School was formerly located in a building in Park Square. In 2010, it moved to Hyde Park.

From 1964 to 1974, the University of Massachusetts Boston campus was located in Park Square.

== Image gallery ==
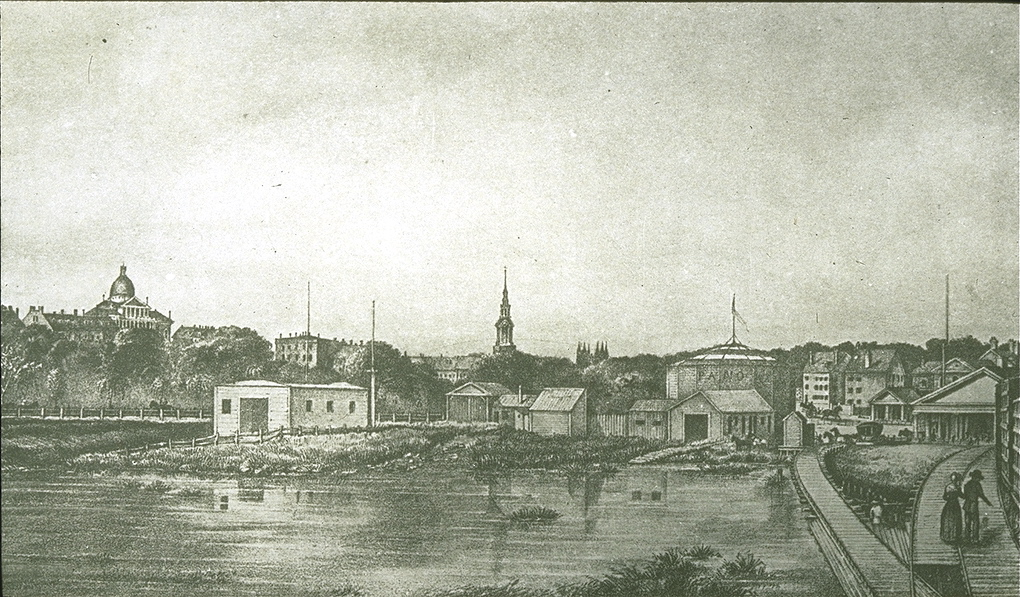
Railroad depot at Park Square in 1837, with the State House in the background, the tidal Charles River basin in the foreground

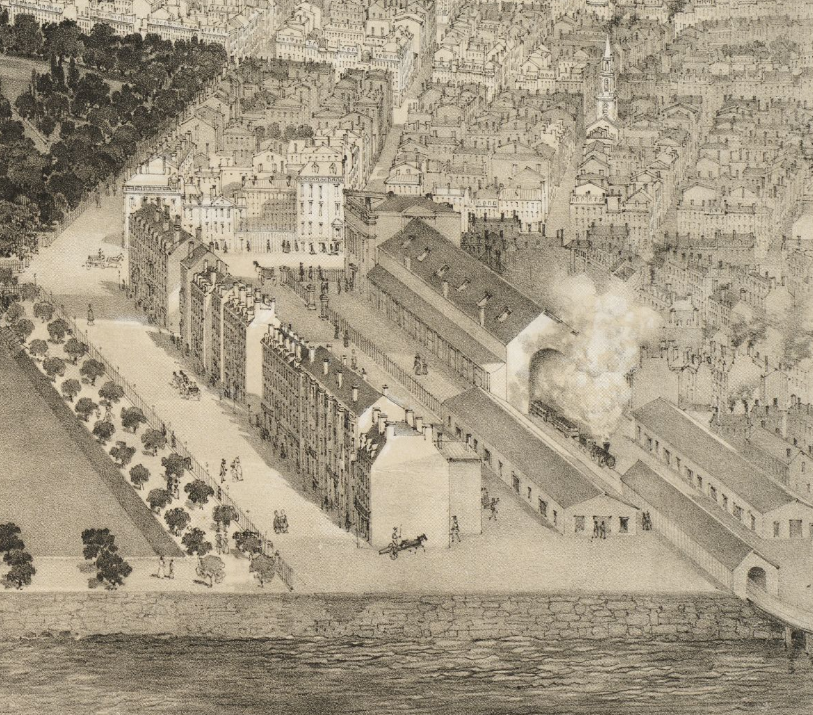
Overview of Park Square, 1850

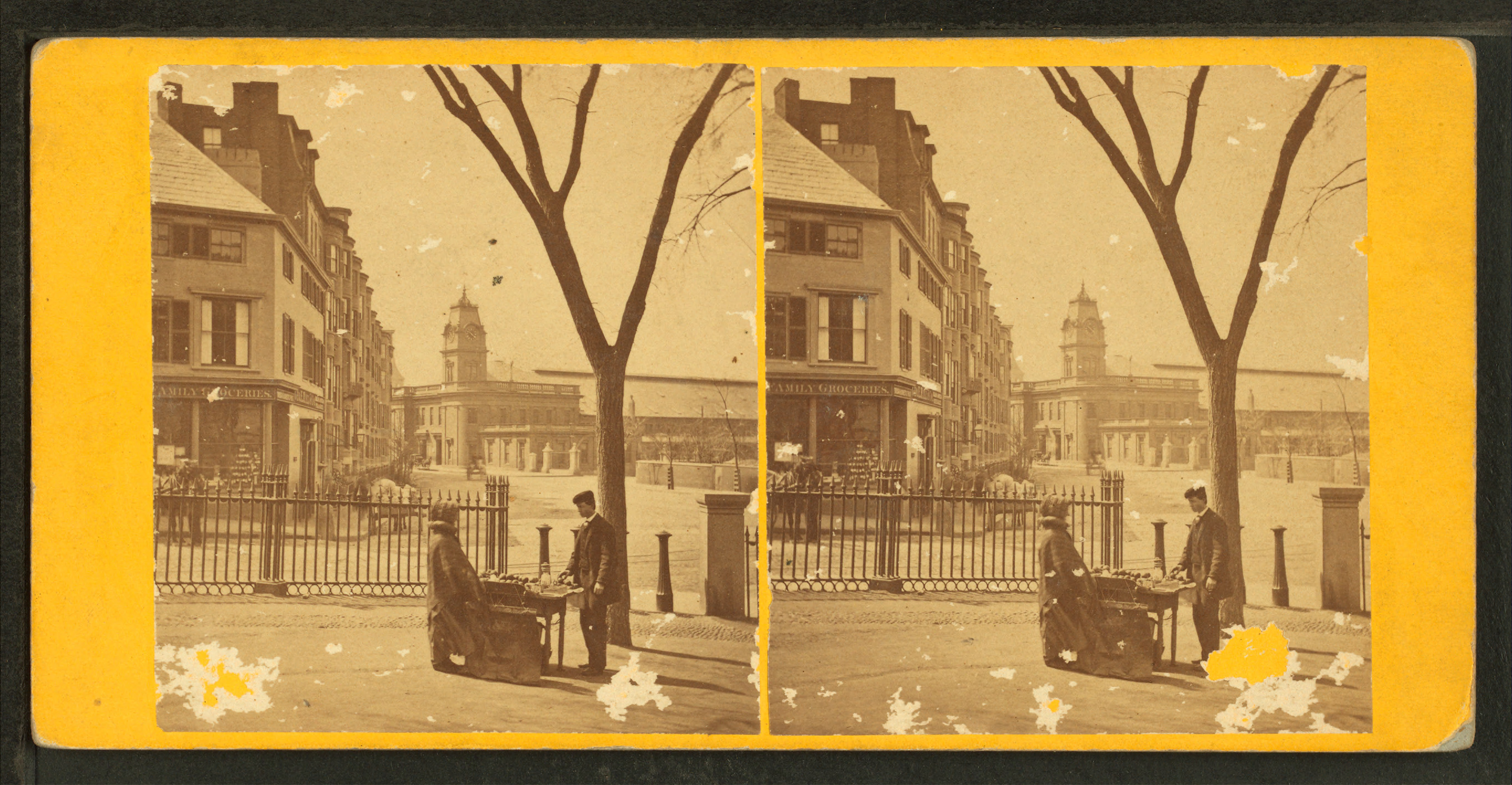
Stereoscopic view of Park Square and train station, from Boston Common, 19th century

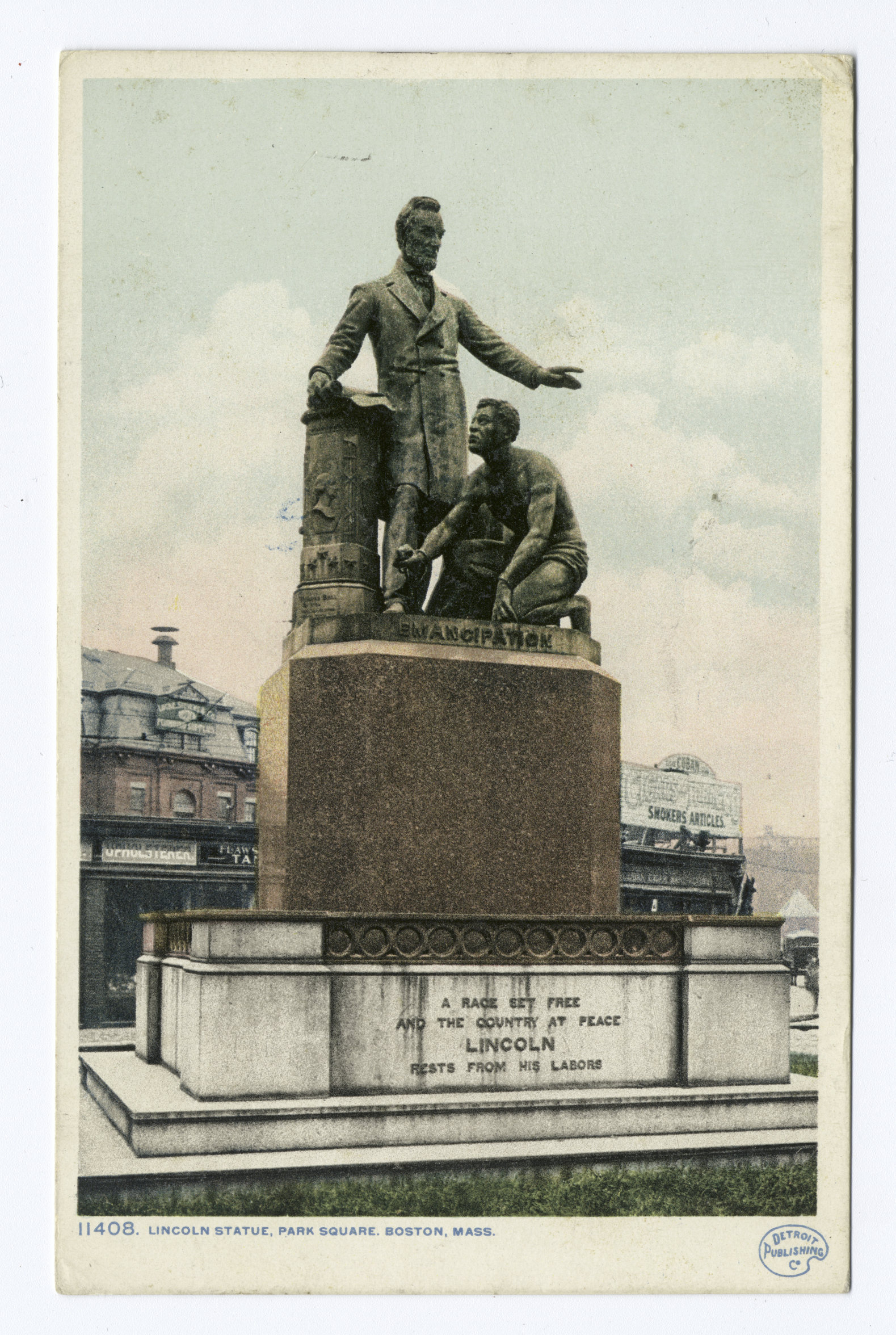
Emancipation Memorial, on display 1879–2020

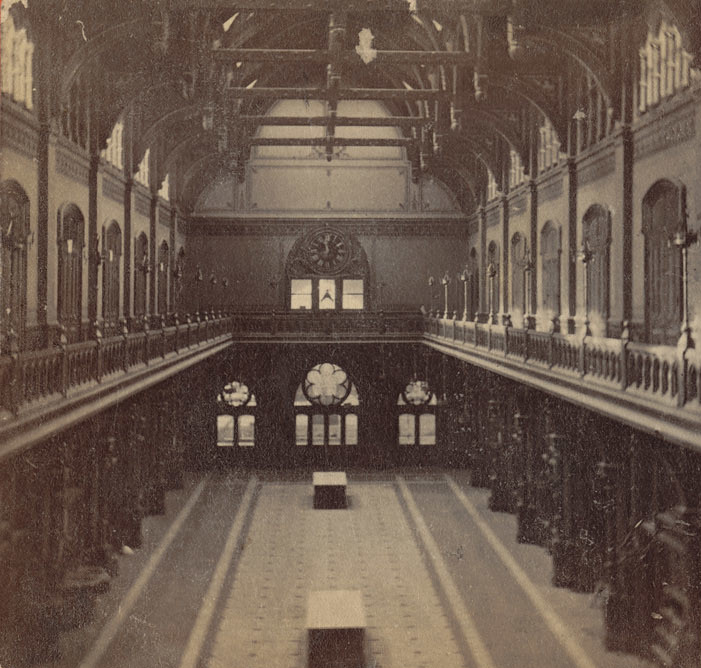
Interior of Boston & Providence Rail Road depot, 19th century

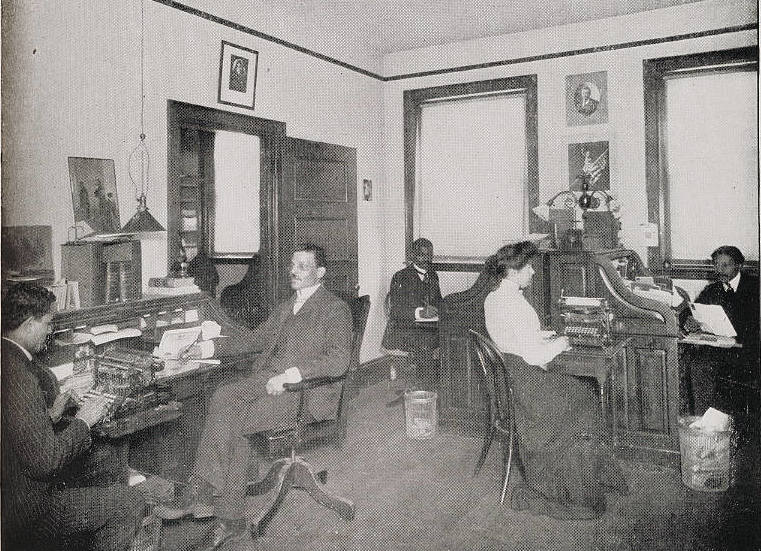
Office of the Colored American Magazine, 1902

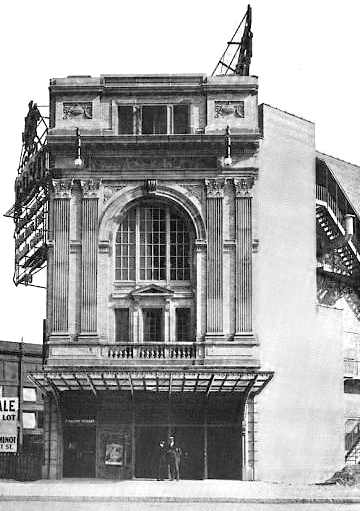
Cort Theatre, Park Square, c. 1915

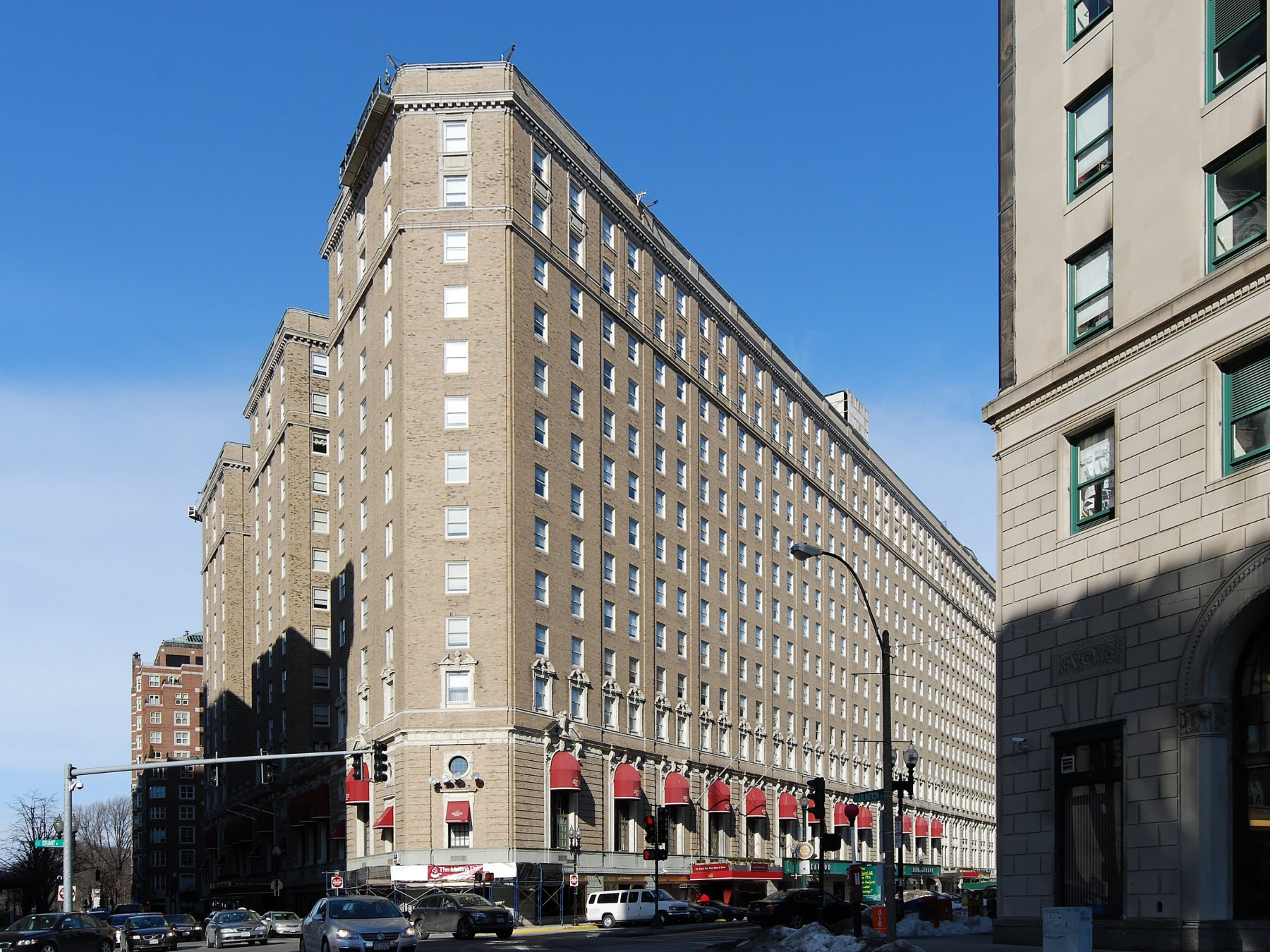
Boston Park Plaza and the former headquarters of the Boston Gas Company, 2009

== See also ==
- Park Square Theatre, Boston (1915–1921)
- Boston Theater District
- Combat Zone, Boston
