= Statue of Charles Sumner =

A number of statues have been made of Massachusetts statesman Charles Sumner.

Statue of Charles Sumner may refer to:

- Statue of Charles Sumner (Boston) by Thomas Ball
- Statue of Charles Sumner (Cambridge) by Anne Whitney
- A bust of Sumner by Thomas Crawford or Martin Milmore
