= General MacArthur Square =

Park in Cambridge, Massachusetts, United States

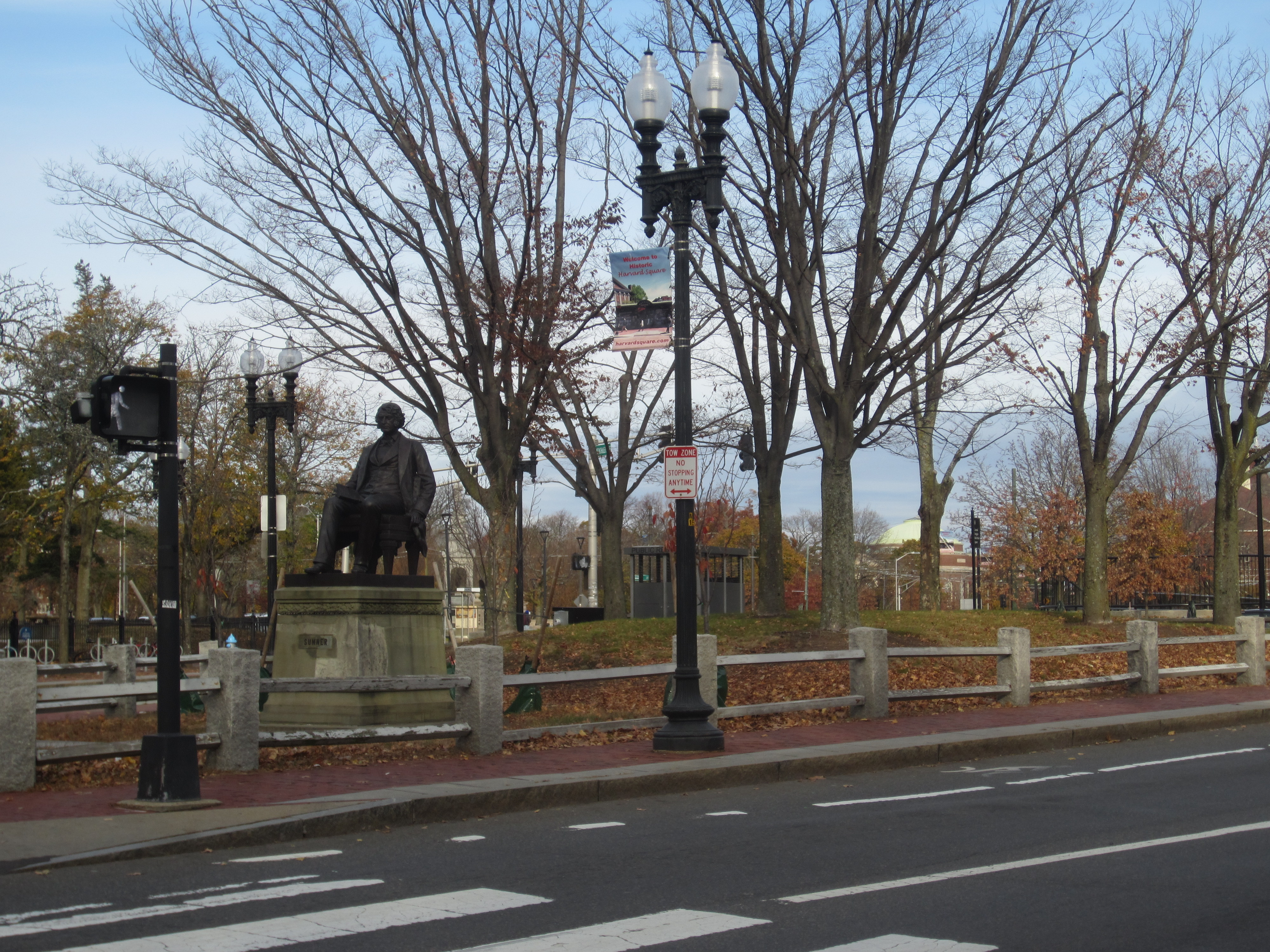
- The park and statue of Charles Sumner in 2019

- Location within Boston
- Type: Park
- Nearest city: Cambridge, Massachusetts
- Coordinates: 42.37481°N 71.11882°W
- Area: 0.2-acre (810 m^{2})

General MacArthur Square is a 0.2-acre (810 m^{2}), V-shaped park in Cambridge, Massachusetts, United States, owned by the city. The city's first 24-hour, freestanding public toilet was installed in the park in 2015.

The Crimson's Norah Murphy described the park as "a glorified traffic island". It features a statue of Charles Sumner by Anne Whitney.
