= Florence Freeman =

Florence Freeman may refer to:

- Florence Freeman (sculptor)
- Florence Freeman (actress)
