= Florence Freeman (sculptor) =

American sculptor

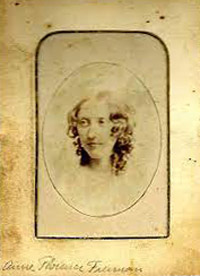
- Born: Ann Florence Freeman; January 14, 1836; Boston, Massachusetts
- Died: August 8, 1883 (aged 47); Rome, Italy
- Known for: Sculpture

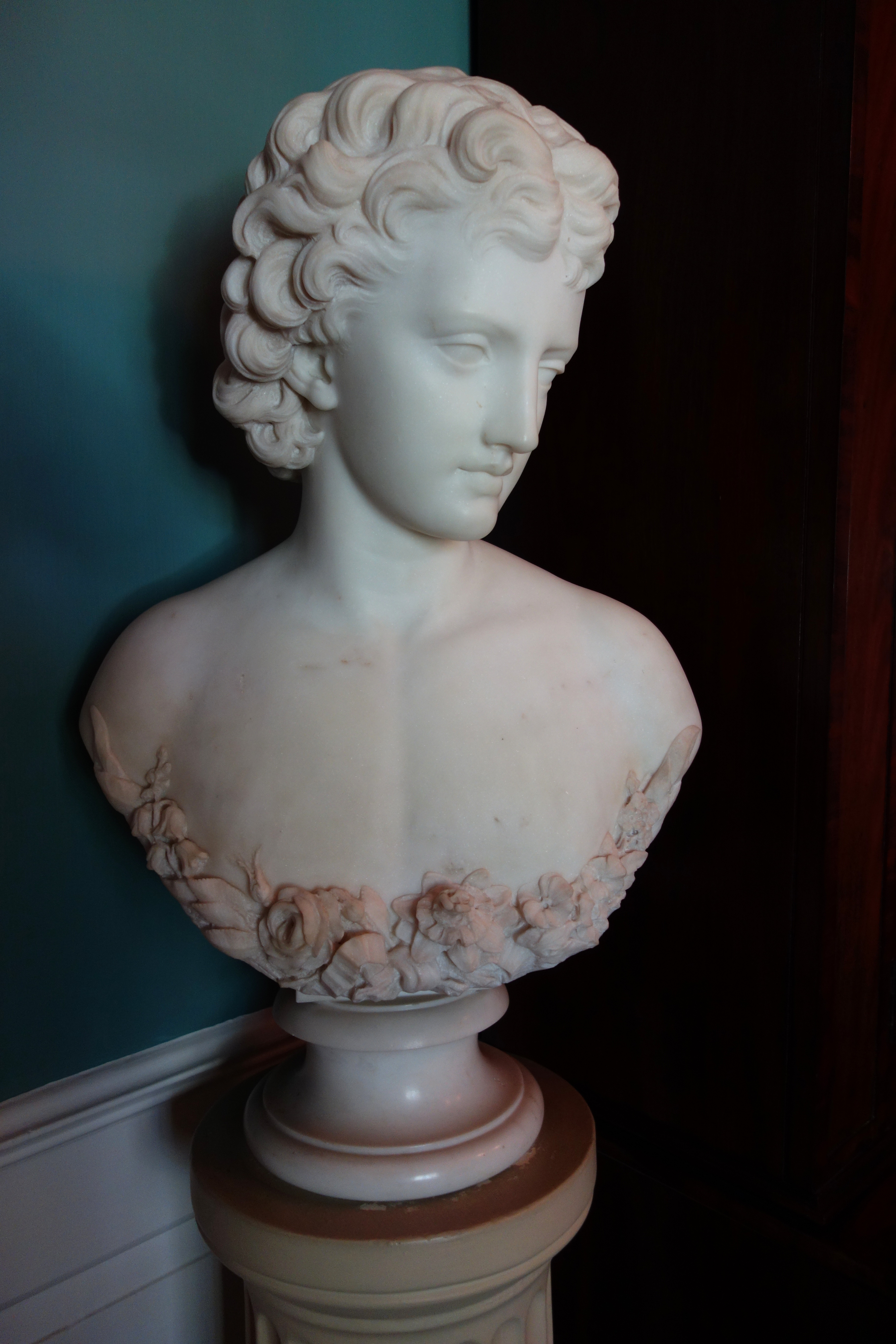
Sandalphon by Florence Freeman

Florence Freeman (January 14, 1836 – August 8, 1883) was an American sculptor.

Freeman was born in Boston, Massachusetts, daughter of Peter Wilder Freeman and Frances Ann Dorr. After studying with Richard Saltonstall Greenough, she went to Italy under the aegis of Charlotte Cushman, and studied for one year in Florence with Hiram Powers. In 1862, she opened a studio in Rome, where she spent her professional life. She executed several bas-reliefs of Dante; a bust of Sandalphon; "The Sleeping Child"; "Thekla, or the Tangled Skein"; and several chimneypieces, one of which, "Children and the Yule Log and Fireside Spirits," was shown at the Centennial exhibition in Philadelphia (1876).

Florence (also known as Flori) was a good friend of sculptor Harriet Hosmer, as well as many other artists then residing in Italy, including Emma Stebbins, Margaret Foley, John Rollin Tilton, Edmonia Lewis and Anne Whitney. She died in Rome on August 8, 1883, from consumption (tuberculosis). and was buried in the Protestant Cemetery. Her younger brother James Goldthwaite Freeman of Boston handled her affairs.
