= Statue of Charles Sumner (Cambridge, Massachusetts) =

Statue in Cambridge, Massachusetts, U.S.

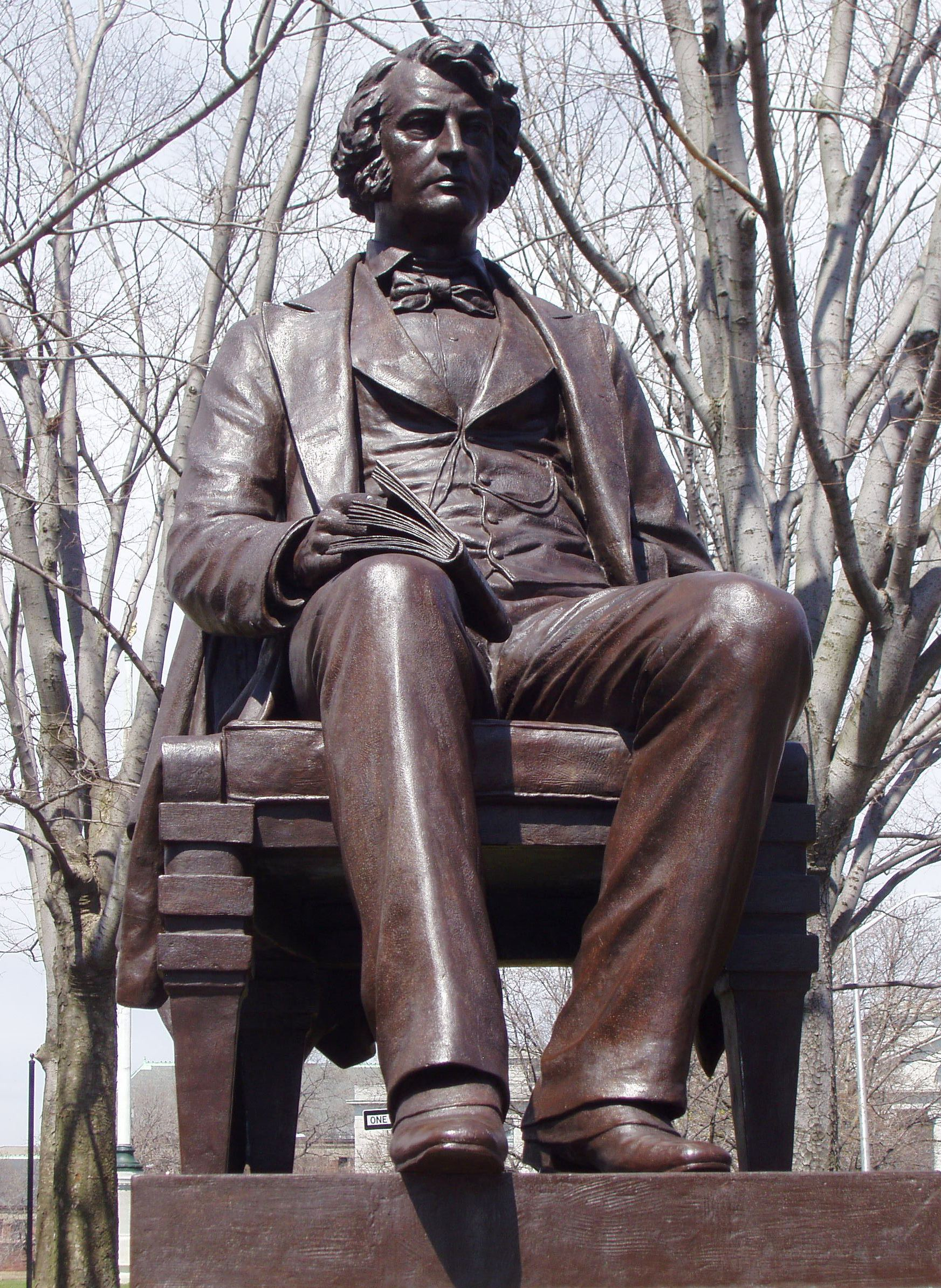
- The statue in 2007
- Artist: Anne Whitney
- Subject: Charles Sumner
- Location: General MacArthur Square; Cambridge, Massachusetts; 42°22′29″N 71°07′08″W

A bronze statue of Charles Sumner, by sculptor Anne Whitney, is installed in General MacArthur Square in Cambridge, Massachusetts. The plaster model for the statue is on display indoors at the Watertown public library. The sculpture of Sumner, a popular local statesman, was commissioned by the Boston Art Committee shortly after his death in 1874.

== History ==
In 1875, the Boston Art Committee hosted a blind competition for model sculptures of Sumner. Whitney knew Sumner, a senator and abolitionist, through her brother Alexander, who had been a classmate of Sumner's. She depicted him seated in a chair, in part because of the artistic practice of portraying people seated to "represent dignity and something of state." She won the contest, including some prize money, however when the judges realized they had selected a work made by a woman, they decided it would be inappropriate for a woman to sculpt a man's legs, and rejected it for installation. They selected a different sculpture by Thomas Ball, which was installed in the Boston Public Garden.

Both the Sumners and the Whitneys were disappointed by this turn of events, but Whitney wrote in a letter, "Bury your grievance; it will take more than the Boston Art committee to quench me." She exhibited the model of Sumner at the Centennial Exposition of 1876 in Philadelphia, and elsewhere around the country. Following an 1879 exhibit of the model, the New York Evening Post wrote of the judge's decision, "Think of a woman bringing her mind to bear on the legs of a man-even if those legs were inside a pair of stone trousers!" The New York Evening Telegram wrote a verse which starts:

"You see, ’tis a fixed law of art, my friend,
That only a man can superintend
The play of muscle and post of limb,
Whenever a statue is made of him. ...

Yet under the dome of the Capitol
Stands Samuel Adams erect and tall,
As free as his namesake before the fall;
And though the image was carved by woman
Rarely is marble so grandly human."

In 1902, an anonymous donor funded the casting of the statue, and friends arranged for its installation in General MacArthur Square, by Harvard Square.
