= Statue of Charles Sumner (Boston) =

Statue in Boston, Massachusetts, U.S.

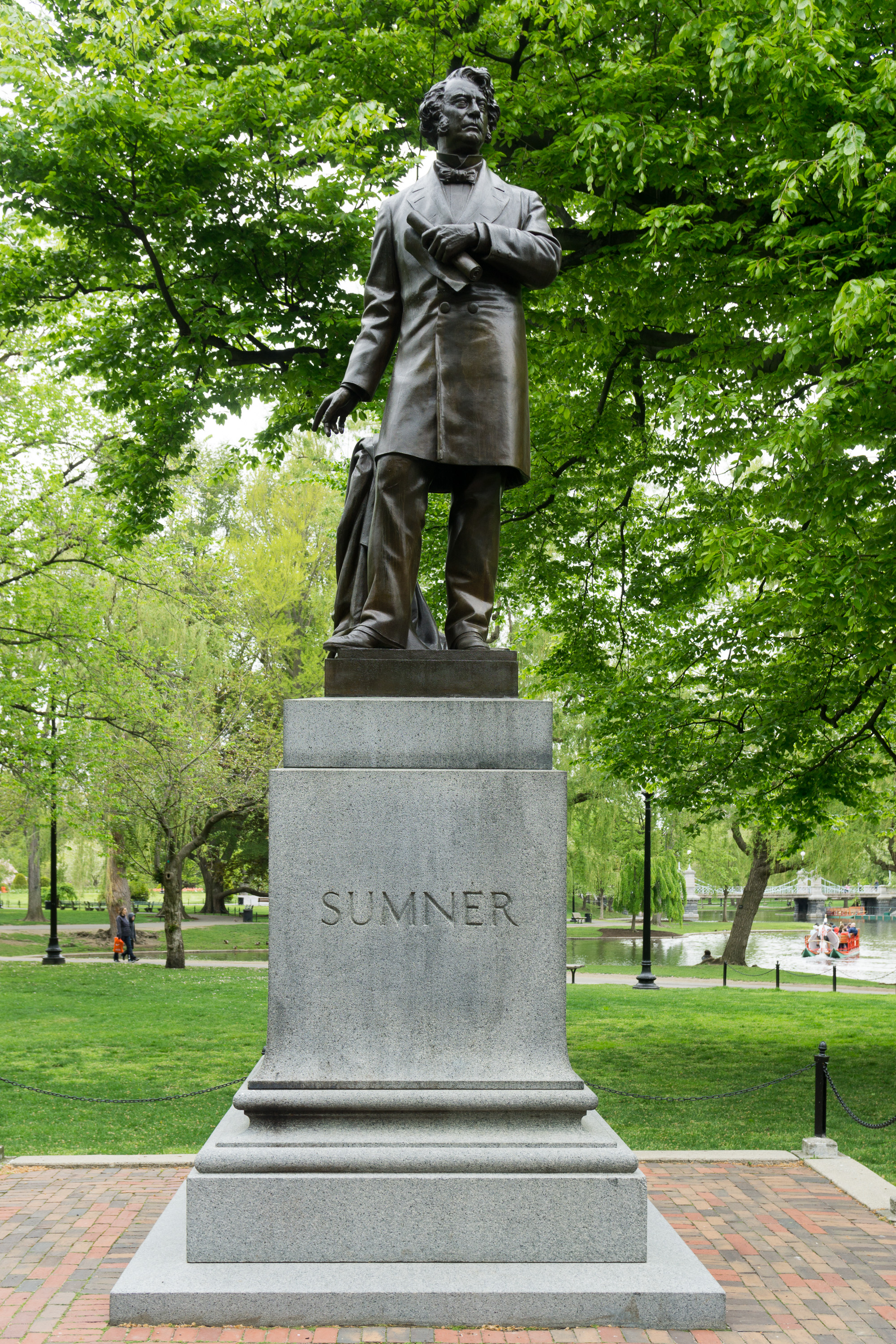
- The statue in 2017
- Artist: Thomas Ball
- Completion date: 1878
- Subject: Charles Sumner
- Location: Boston, Massachusetts, U.S.; 42°21′8.7″N 71°4′11.4″W

The statue of Charles Sumner in Boston's Public Garden is a bronze statue by Thomas Ball, commissioned by the Boston Art Committee to honor Sumner after his death in 1874. The statue was dedicated in 1878.

== Description and history ==
In 1875, the Boston Art Committee held a national design competition to design a statue of Sumner. The winning design of a seated Sumner, by Anne Whitney, was displayed at the Centennial Exposition in Philadelphia the following year. The Committee, on discovering that Whitney was female, decided not to proceed with the casting and installation of her work.

Ball was living in Florence at the time, and came to the United States to attend the Centennial Exposition. He had previously worked in Boston and produced many statues of public figures in the Boston area, including Governor Andrew, and received a commission to design this statue. Ball returned to Florence to develop his design. (Note: A story told of President Ulysses Grant alleges that after his presidency he visited Florence in 1878, and visited the studios of American artists; when he entered Ball’s studio, seeing him at work on this statue, Grant exclaimed: “Charles Sumner! That’s the fourth Sumner I’ve seen this morning!”) The statue depicts a standing Sumner holding a roll of papers to his chest, and gesturing to one side. It was cast in Paris and shipped back to Boston in 1878.

The statue was dedicated on December 23, 1878 in the Boston Public Garden. It was surveyed as part of the Smithsonian Institution's "Save Outdoor Sculpture!" program in 1993.

== See also ==
- Statue of Charles Sumner (Cambridge, Massachusetts)
