= Anne Whitney =

American sculptor

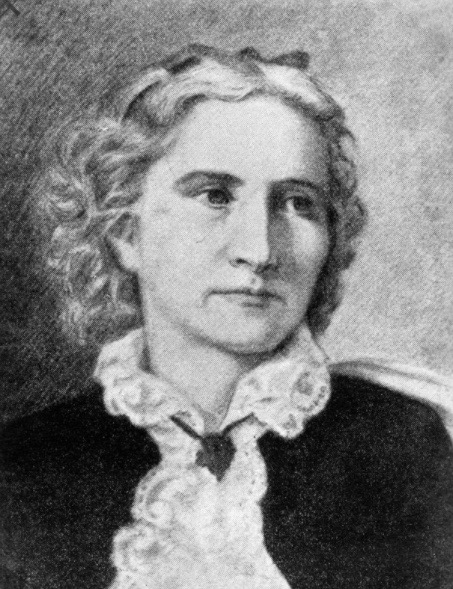
- Drawing of Whitney
- Born: September 2, 1821; Watertown, Massachusetts, US
- Died: January 23, 1915 (aged 93); Boston, Massachusetts, US
- Resting place: Mount Auburn Cemetery
- Known for: Sculptor, poet

Anne Whitney (September 2, 1821 – January 23, 1915) was an American sculptor and poet. She made full-length and bust sculptures of prominent political and historical figures, and her works are in major museums in the United States. She received prestigious commissions for monuments. Two statues of Samuel Adams were made by Whitney and are located in Washington, D.C.'s National Statuary Hall Collection and in front of Faneuil Hall in Boston. She also created two monuments to Leif Erikson.

Through her art, she expressed her liberal views regarding abolition, women's rights, and other social issues. Prominent historical figures are depicted in her sculptures, including Harriet Beecher Stowe. She portrayed women who lived ground-breaking lives as suffragists, professional artists, and non-traditional positions for women at the time, including noted economist and Wellesley College president Alice Freeman Palmer. Unusual for her era, she lived an unconventional, independent life and had a lifelong relationship with fellow artist, Abby Adeline Manning, with whom she lived and traveled to Europe.

== Early life ==
Anne Whitney was born in Watertown, Massachusetts, on September 2, 1821. She was the youngest child of Nathaniel Ruggles Whitney Jr.—a justice of the peace—and Sally, or Sarah, Stone Whitney, both of whom were descendants of Watertown settlers of 1635. She had a sister and five brothers. The family moved to East Cambridge by the time that Whitney was 12 years old and returned to Watertown in 1850.

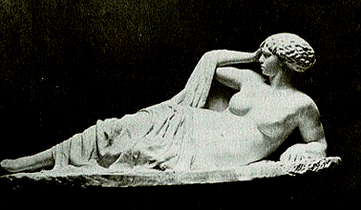
Africa, 1864, made during the Civil War to express her beliefs about abolition of slavery

Her family were Unitarians and abolitionists. They fought for women's and education rights, as well as abolition of slavery.

Except the 1834–1835 school year that she attended at a private school run by Mrs. Samuel Little in Bucksport, Maine, she received her education from private tutors. Her year at private school allowed her to teach. Whitney showed early interests in poetry and sculpture.

== Career ==
=== Early career ===
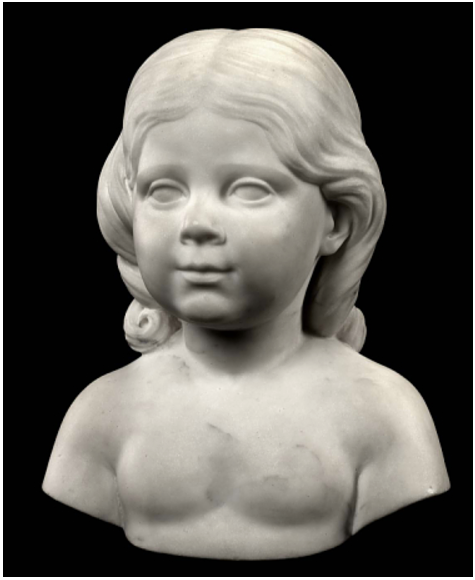
Anne Whitney, Laura Brown, 1859, Smithsonian American Art Museum

From 1847 to 1849, she ran a small private school in Salem, Massachusetts, after which she traveled by ship to visit cousins in New Orleans, via Cuba, from December 1850 to May 1851.

She began making portrait busts of family members in about 1855. At the time that Whitney began to study art, women had limited educational opportunities. Unlike male students, women could not take life drawing classes. Visits to art galleries required that sculptures of nude men needed to have the genitalia covered before the women could enter the gallery. Plaster casts of the human form could not be used in co-educational classrooms. Whitney moved to New York so that she could study anatomy at a Brooklyn hospital from 1859 and into 1860, and then studied drawing and modeling at the Pennsylvania Academy of the Fine Arts in Philadelphia.

Whitney was on the front end of the New Woman movement. Rather than following what was considered a more acceptable path for women of that era to explore her interest through poetry, she sought to fully express her viewpoints about social causes through art.

She made Laura Brown (1859), a bust of a young girl, and exhibited it at the National Academy of Design in New York. It is now in the collection of the Smithsonian American Art Museum. Also in 1859, she published Poems, a collection of individual poems she had previously published in newspapers and magazines such as Atlantic Monthly and Harper's Magazine. North American Review said of her poetry, "Every word strikes home; every line is clean, distinct as if cut in stone; the pen in her hands becomes so like the sculptor’s chisel that one questions if poetry be the fittest exponent of her genius.

=== Symbolic works of art ===
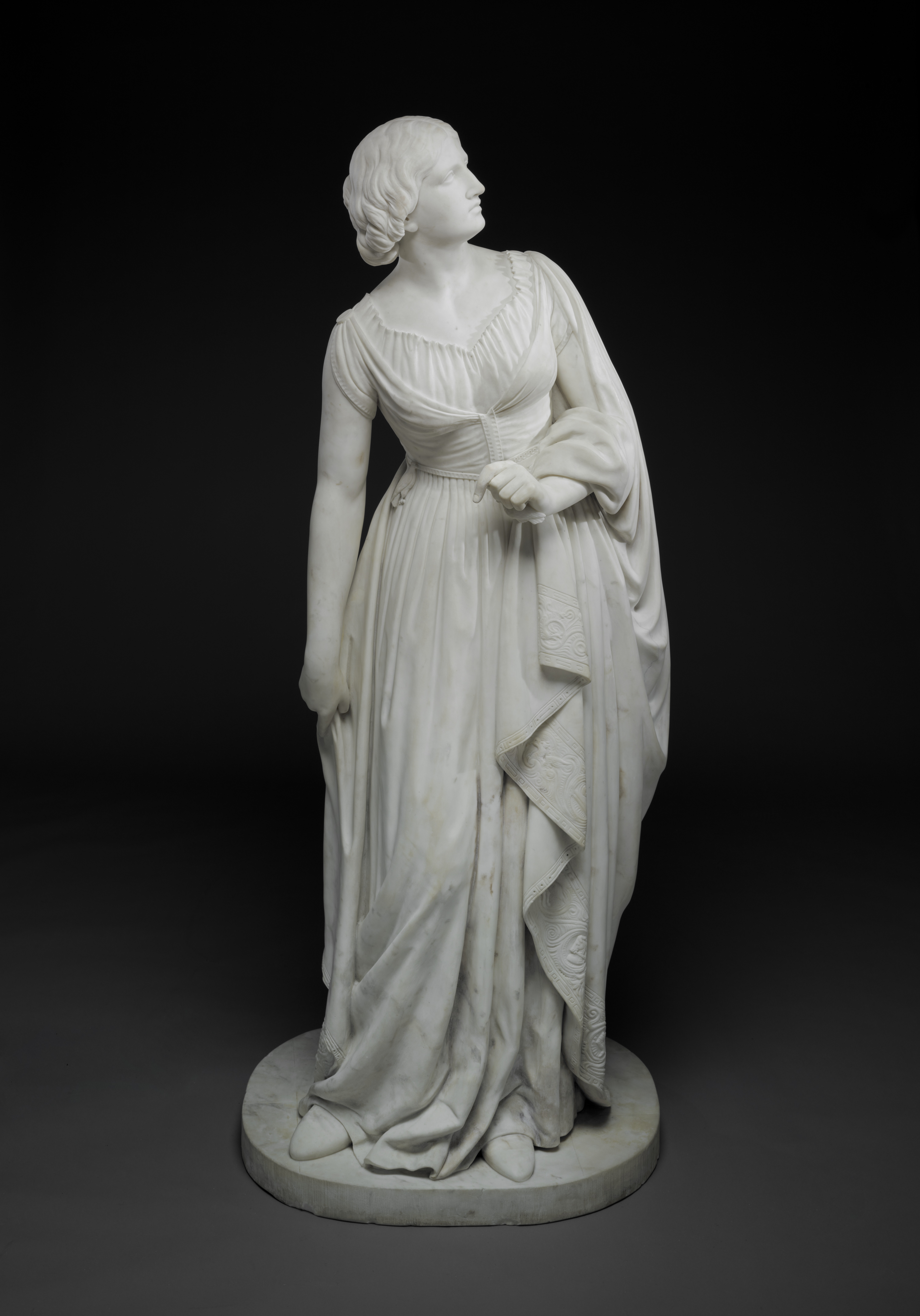
Lady Godiva, marble sculpture, by 1864, Dallas Museum of Art

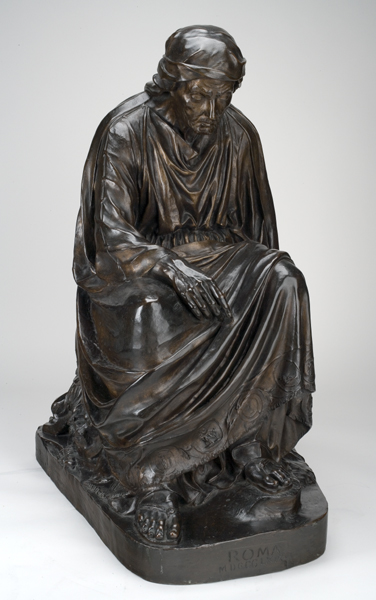
Roma, 1869, Davis Museum at Wellesley College

In 1860, she established a studio in Watertown. Two years later, she rented a studio in Boston near William Rimmer, an artist and physician, with whom she studied. He critiqued her works as she began making full-length sculptures. She made a life-size sculpture of Lady Godiva and, during the Civil War, a large sculpture entitled Africa. Both were expressions of her political viewpoints. Africa represented an entire race breaking free of slavery and Lady Godiva represented a heroine relieving the poor of exorbitant taxes. They were shown in 1864 and 1865 in Boston and New York. Lady Godiva, which was positively received at its exhibits, resides at the Dallas Museum of Art, Texas. In 1867, she exhibited work in the Boston gallery of De Vries, Ibarra & Co.

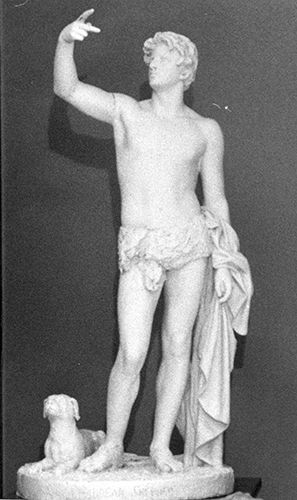
Chaldean Shepherd, 1868

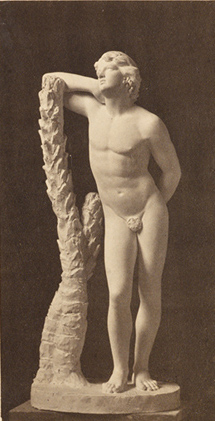
Lotus Eater, plaster, 1868, Newark Museum

Whitney moved to Rome in 1867. While there, she worked in the city and travelled, including two trips to Munich for further study, including learning foundry techniques for working in bronze. In Rome, she was able to make works using nude male models, where it was not considered improper for a woman. Her works from this period include Chaldean Shepherd at Smith College Museum of Art and Lotus Eater at Newark Museum. She associated with a group of female artists in Rome that Henry James described as the "that strange sisterhood of American 'lady sculptors' who at one time settled upon the seven hills in a white, marmorean flock". She was acquainted with American artists that were in Florence and Rome, like Edmonia Lewis, Harriet Hosmer, Florence Freeman, and others within the circle of stage actress Charlotte Cushman, a patron of the arts.

While Whitney was in Italy there was political, social, and economic instability due to the attempts to unify the country, during which the new secular government was at odds with the papacy. She created the bronze sculpture Roma in 1869 to represent the "spiritual destitution" that the citizens experienced due to the political climate, symbolized by the ancient beggar woman. It was shown in Philadelphia, Boston, and London. She departed for the United States in 1870 when Rome was overtaken by Giuseppe Garibaldi's forces, then returned to Rome for one year before moving back to the United States in 1871. She then exhibited her sculpture of Haitian leader Toussaint Louverture in Boston. She established a studio in Boston in 1872.

=== Monuments ===
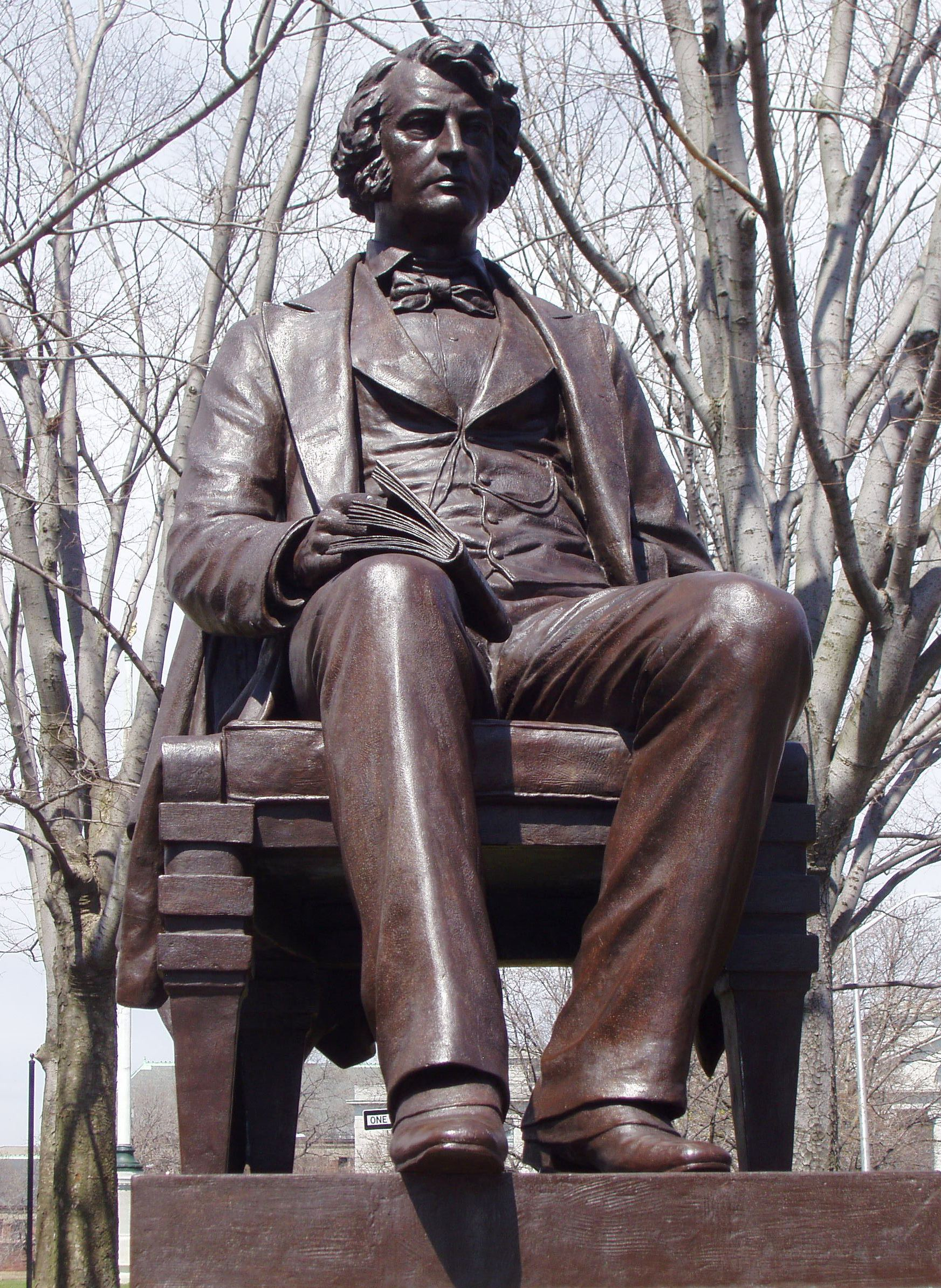
Charles Sumner, 1902 (from 1875 model), Harvard Square, Cambridge

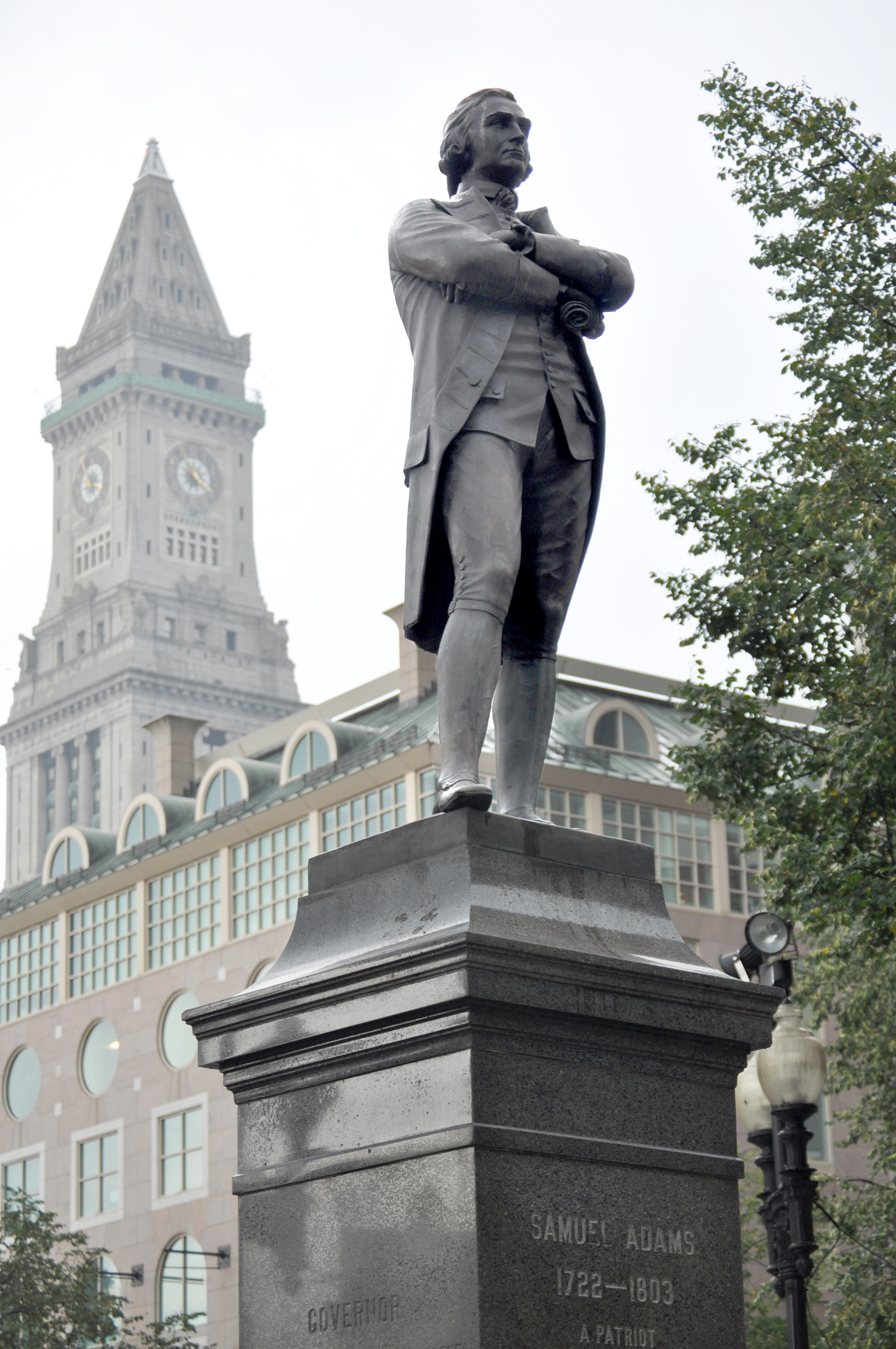
Statue of Samuel Adams, bronze and granite, 1880, Faneuil Hall Plaza, Boston

In 1875, she submitted a model sculpture of Charles Sumner for a blind competition conducted by the Boston Art Committee. She knew Sumner, a senator and abolitionist, through her brother Alexander, who was a classmate of Sumner's at Harvard University. Whitney's model competently captured Sumner's frame and features. She depicted him seated in a chair, in part because of ancient Greek artist's practice of portraying prominent people seated to "represent dignity and something of state." She won the contest, including receiving the prize money, until the judges realized that they had selected a work made by a woman; they thought it would be inappropriate for a woman to sculpt a man's legs. The judges rejected her offering and selected Thomas Ball's sculpture for the Boston Public Garden. Both the Sumners and the Whitneys were disappointed, but Whitney wrote in a letter, "Bury your grievance; it will take more than the Boston Art committee to quench me."

She exhibited the model of Sumner at the Centennial Exposition of 1876. Following an 1879 exhibit of the model, the New York Evening Post stated of the judge's decision, "Think of a woman bringing her mind to bear on the legs of a man-even if those legs were inside a pair of stone trousers! New York Evening Telegram wrote a verse which starts out: "You see, ’tis a fixed law of art, my friend, / That only a man can superintend / The play of muscle and post of limb, / Whenever a statue is made of him." The verse later states "Yet under the dome of the Capitol / Stands Samuel Adams erect and tall, / As free as his namesake before the fall; / And though the image was carved by woman / Rarely is marble so grandly human."

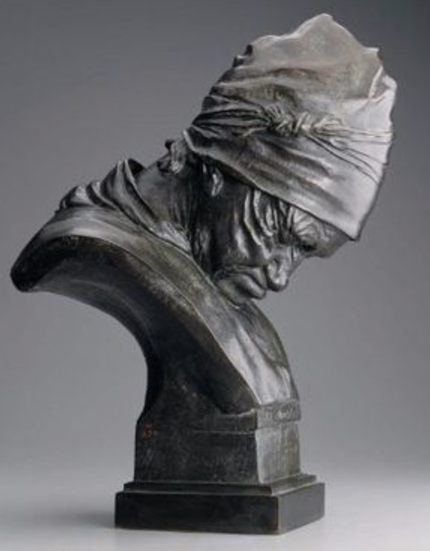
Le Modèle, 1875

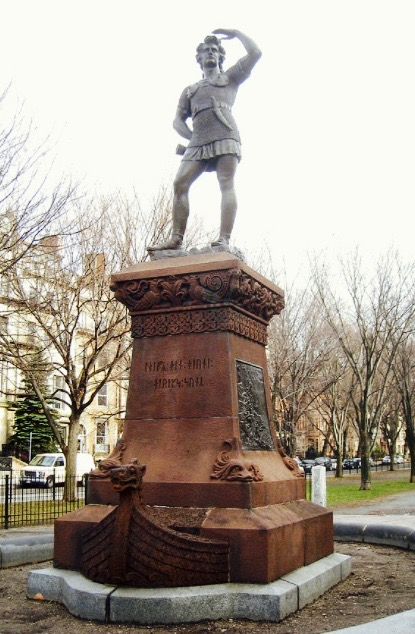
Leif Erikson, 1887, Commonwealth Avenue, Boston

Among her well-known public monuments is the statue of Samuel Adams (1876) in the National Statuary Hall Collection in the US Capitol, Washington, D.C. Whitney traveled to Italy in 1875 to acquire the marble for the sculpture. During the trip, she studied French sculpture techniques at Écouen, realized in her work Le Modèle, which was created with a degree of Realism. A bronze and granite replica (1880) of the Samuel Adams sculpture is installed in Faneuil Hall Plaza in Boston, where Adams gave speeches about British rule and taxation.

Another important work is the statue of Leif Erikson (1887) in Boston. She corresponded with Frederick Law Olmsted about the placement of the monument and its landscaping. Another edition, Leif, the Discoverer, was placed in Juneau Park in Milwaukee, Wisconsin.

=== Portrait sculptures ===
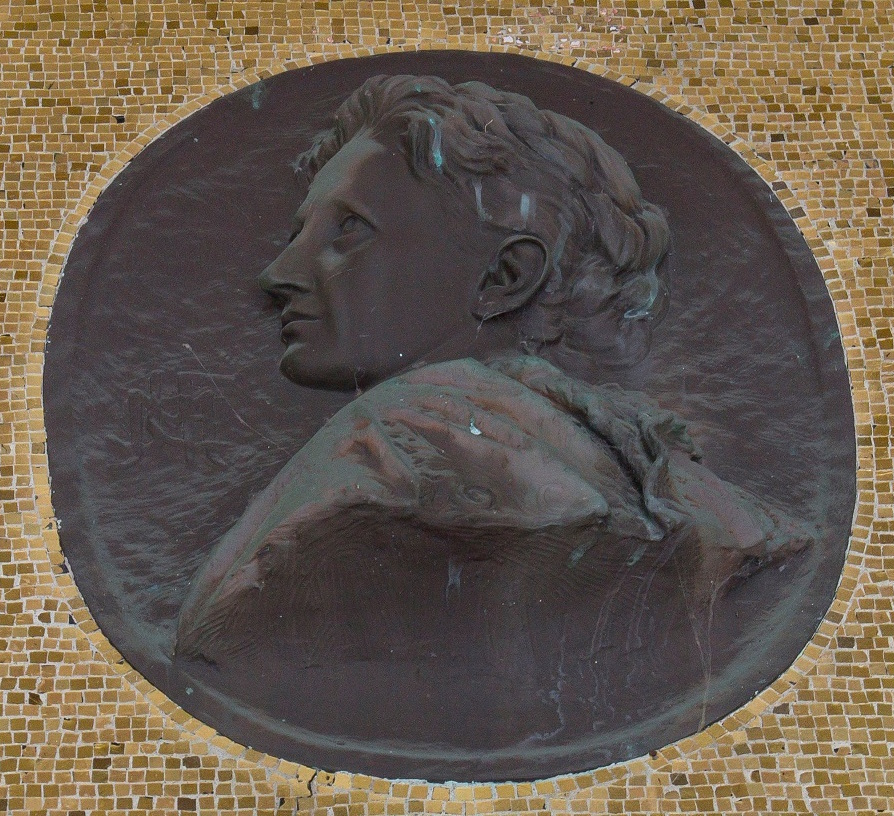
Jennie McGraw Fiske, bronze relief, 1891, Uris Library, Cornell University

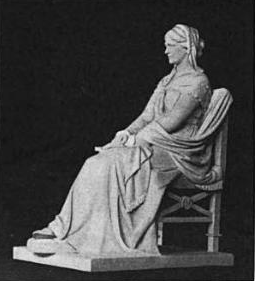
Harriet Martineau

For about 20 years up to 1896, Whitney focused on portrait sculptures of prominent individuals. Garrison said Whitney's sculpture, William Lloyd Garrison (1879), was the closest likeness made of him. It is at the Massachusetts Historical Society in Boston. She depicted Alice Freeman Palmer, President of Wellesley College; economist Harriet Martineau; and suffragists Frances Willard and Whitney's cousin Lucy Stone, which is in the Boston Public Library. She also depicted Mary Tileston Hemenway, the famed philanthropist and reformer. Her sculpture of Harriet Beecher Stowe (1892) is at the Mark Twain House, and a bust is at the Day House, owned by the adjacent Harriet Beecher Stowe House in Hartford, Connecticut. The Uris Library at Cornell University houses the Jennie McGraw Fiske Medallion.

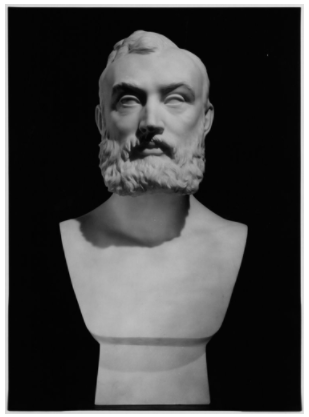
Edward Charles Pickering, President of Harvard University, 1888, Harvard Art Museums

She completed statues and busts of other famous individuals, such as Edward Charles Pickering and James Walker, presidents of Harvard University. The busts are at the Harvard Art Museums. She also made sculptures John Keats of the poet, and sculptures of Samuel Sewall, Robert Gould Shaw, and Eben Norton Horsford. Other of her works can be found in the collections of the Amherst College, and the Woman's Christian Temperance Union.

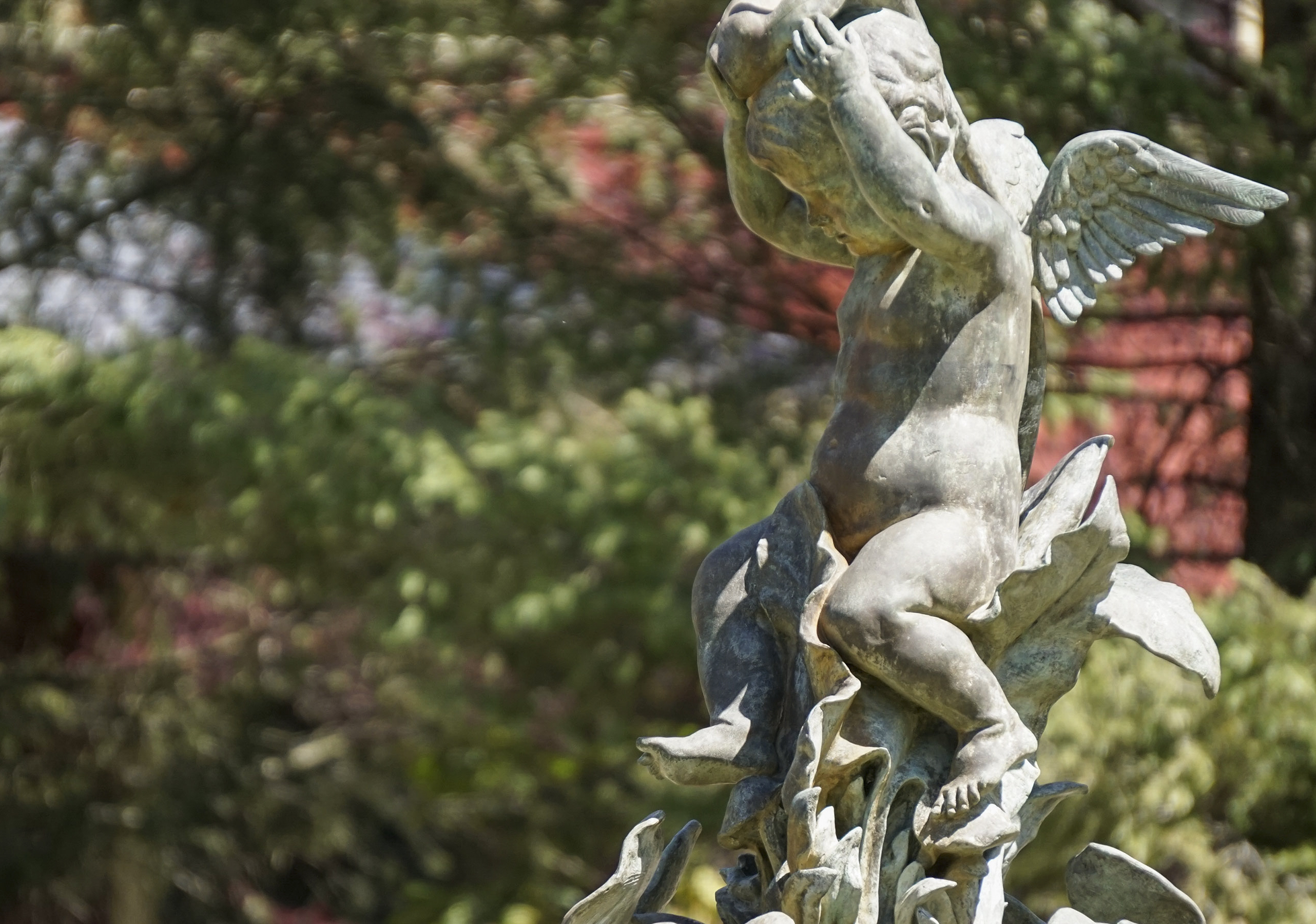
Child with Calla Lily Leaves. West Newton, MA. Photo by Diane Fassino.

Although she was still healthy and vibrant, her career began to slow down into the 1890s. She did, though, create a larger version of Roma for the Palace of Fine Arts at the World's Columbian Exposition of 1893.

For the same exposition she also created Child with Calla Lily Leaves, a fountain in bronze with a winged cherub on a stem above a basin decorated with leaves and vines representative of the emerging Art Nouveau style. This was on display in the center of the Hall of Honor in the Woman's Building at the Exposition. A replica of this fountain was cast at the request of Mariana Porter, and is located in West Newton, MA on the corner of Chestnut and Highland Streets, installed in memory of Anne Whitney's close friend, Catherine Porter Lambert (1817–1900), who also came from a family of abolitionists. Her last major work of art was the creation of the sculpture from the model of Charles Sumner sculpture from 1875. It was completed in 1902 and is installed at Harvard Square.

== Personal life ==
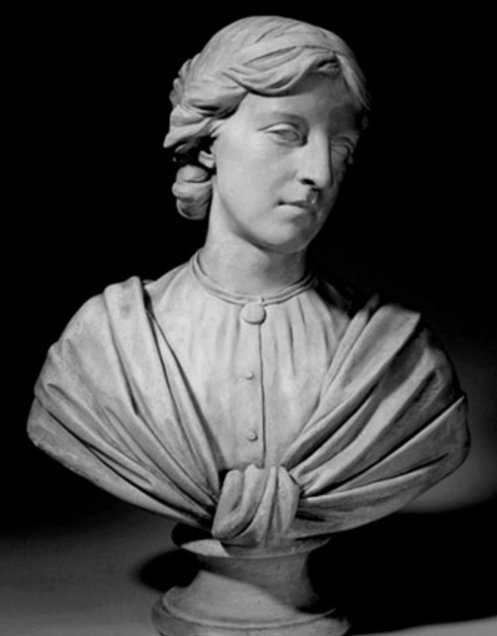
Abby Adeline Manning (1836–1906), Davis Museum, Wellesley College.

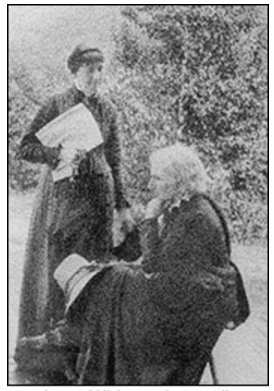
Abby Adeline Manning and Anne Whitney, taken by 1906 when Manning died

Throughout her adulthood, she was an advocate for forest conservation, women's rights, abolition of slavery, and equal educational opportunities for African-Americans. Whitney was an individualist, who lived independently and cut her hair short, which annoyed her Victorian neighbors. She wrote of her independent nature in one of her poems, "You are welcome, world, to criticize, carp and croak yourself hoarse if you will." She was active in political, literary and artistic circles and supported liberal activists, sculptors and other artists, entertaining people like Harriet Hosmer and Edmonia Lewis at her home. One of her friends and supporters was writer Annie Adams Fields, who found her to be a "noble, simple, strong living woman.

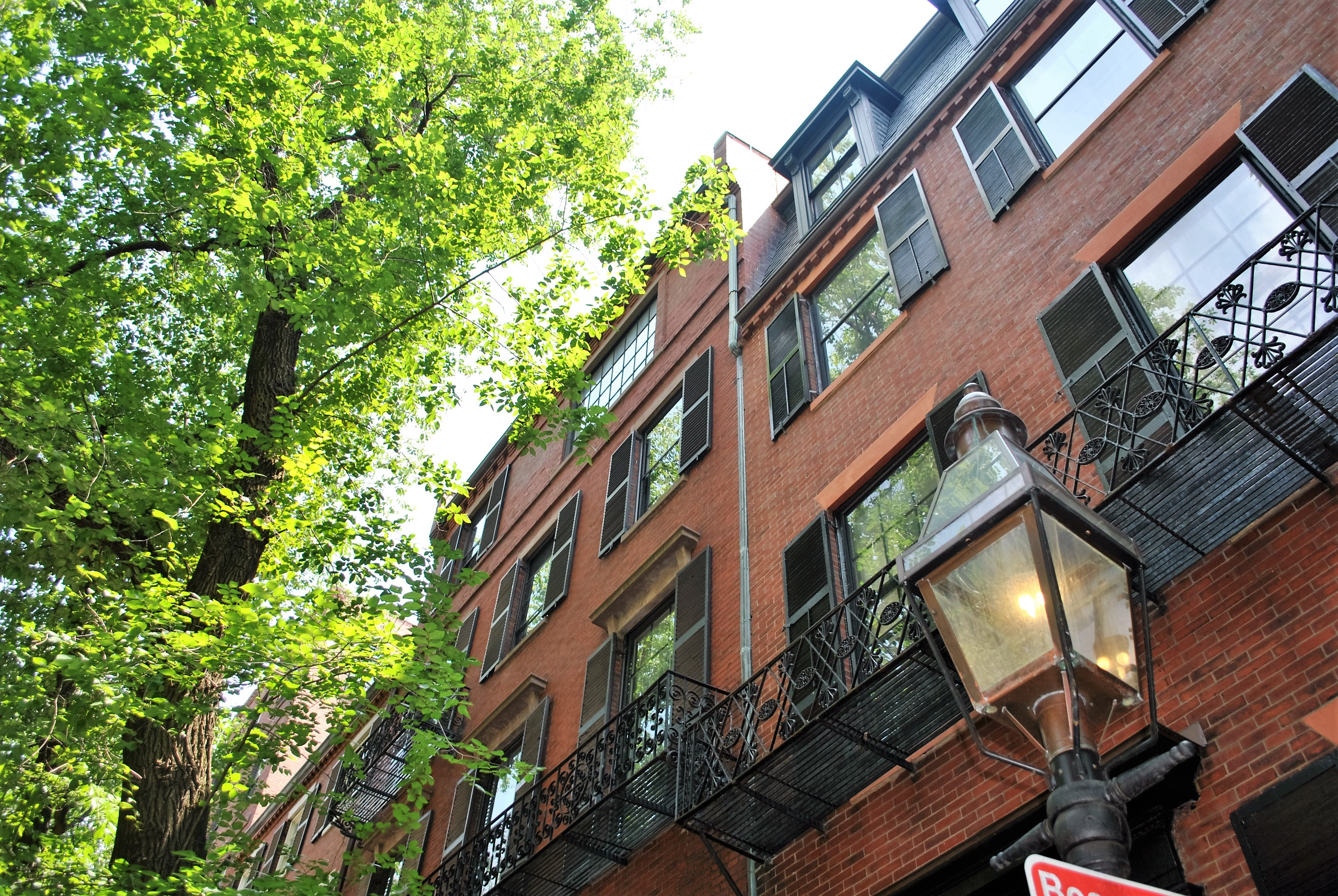
Anne Whitney Studio, Boston

She purchased a house in Boston at 92 Mt. Vernon Street in 1876 and established a studio on its top floor. The house, located in Beacon Hill is on the Boston Women's Heritage Trail. Six years later she purchased a farm in Shelburne, New Hampshire, with views overlooking Mount Washington, Mount Adams, and Mount Madison. She lived at her home on Mt. Vernon Street until October 1893 when she moved to Beacon Street at the Charlesgate Hotel, near her statue of Leif Erikson on Commonwealth Avenue. She lived with and shared her life with Abby Adeline Manning (1836–1906), who devoted her life to Whitney. Whitney Manning lived abroad in the 1860s and 1870s, in Rome, Florence, and Paris. They had what was called a "Boston marriage", a term for a long-term relationship between upper-class, educated women, which was generally accepted within the community. Fields said of the relationship, "the two women complement and repose each other."

Whitney died on January 23, 1915, in Boston, Massachusetts of cancer and was buried in Cambridge at Mount Auburn Cemetery alongside Abby Adeline Manning.

== Legacy ==
Whitney's Leif Eriksson in Boston

She created prominent monuments for public sites, like the United States Capitol, of historical figures Samuel Adams, Charles Sumner, and Leif Erikson. Even though the works are well-known, her association as creator of the works is not widely recognized. Her works, though, are in a number of museums and collections, including Davis Museum at Wellesley that has seven of her works, Roma, Harriet Martineau, Abby Adeline Manning, Ann Mary Hale, Alice Freeman Palmer, Relief of George H. Palmer, and Eben Norton Horsford. Her portrait of Abby Adeline Manning is also at the Peabody Essex Museum, Salem, Massachusetts.

Whitney also modeled for Cyrus Dallin's 1915 sculpture of Anne Hutchinson that is on the grounds of the Massachusetts State House. This same grouping was later incorporated into Dallin's 1922 Provincetown, Massachusetts sculpture Signing of the Mayflower Compact.

She is also not known for her active role in the expatriate communities in Rome, Florence, and France—where women were able to attain a richer educational experience and access to original works of art that was not afforded to women in the United States at that time. As Louisa May Alcott said in Little Women, when independent women felt the need to "go to Rome, and do fine pictures, and be the best artist in the whole world." Whitney said of Rome, "It is certain that there is not another city on this earth which gives so much (to me) for so little." Whitney's letters during that time provide insight into the importance of her time in Europe towards her artistic development.

The Anne Whitney Archive at Wellesley College holds more than 4000 letters, photographs, and other documentation that includes more than 400 letters she sent to her family about her life abroad. Jacqueline Marie Musacchio's article "Mapping the 'White Marmorean Flock': Anne Whitney Abroad, 1866–1867" uses Whitney's extensive correspondence to create a timeline and associated maps of two trips Whitney made in Europe during this period.
