= Eastport City Hall =

- Former Boynton High School
- U.S. National Register of Historic Places
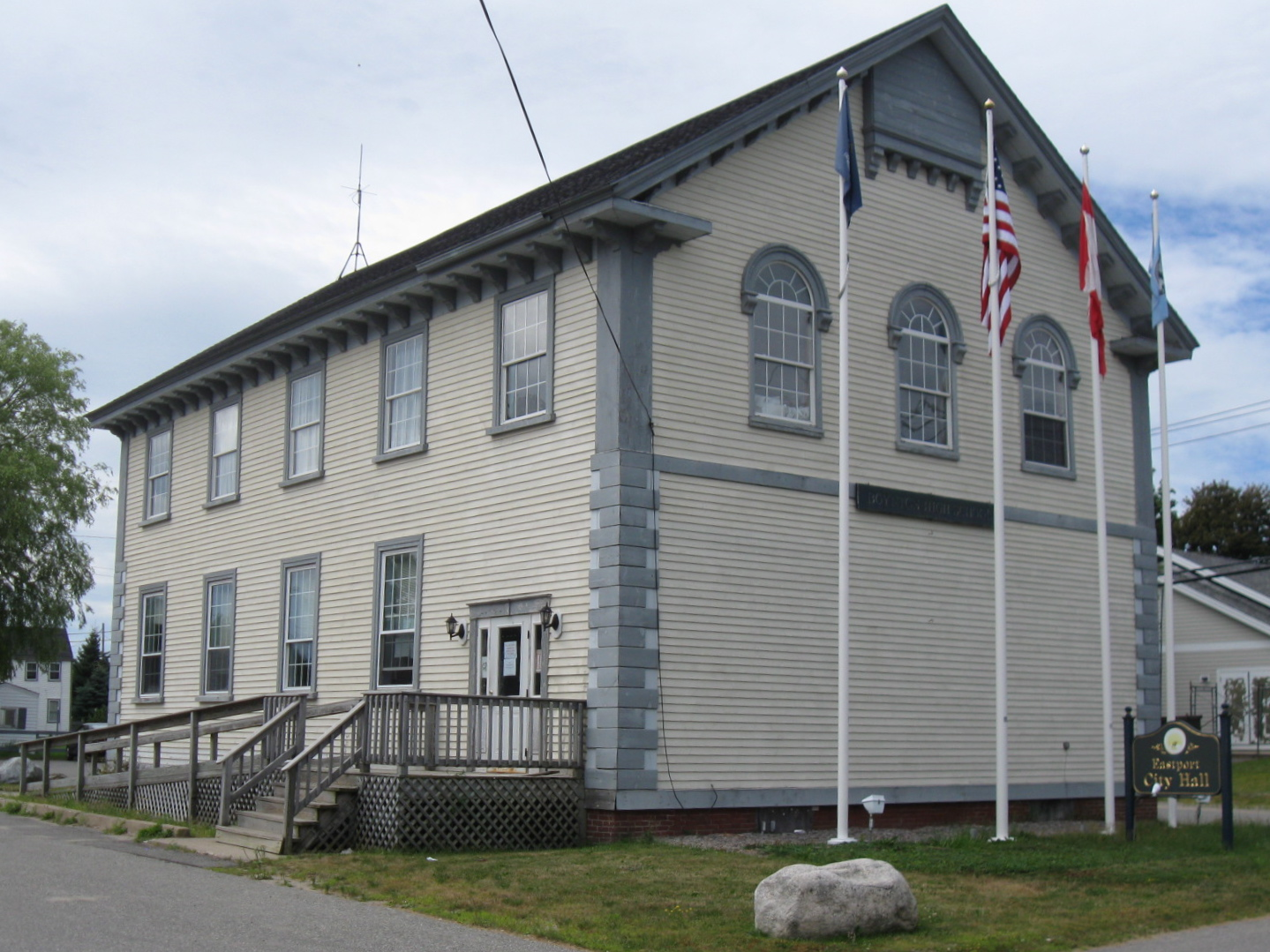

- Location within Maine Location within the United States
- Location: 78 High Street, Eastport, Maine
- Coordinates: 44.9055°N 66.9901°W
- Area: 0.3 acres (0.12 ha)
- Built: 1847
- Architect: Gridley James Fox Bryant
- Architectural style: Italianate
- NRHP reference No.: 02000351
- Added to NRHP: April 11, 2002

The Eastport City Hall, originally built as the Boynton High School, is an historic municipal building at 78 High Street in Eastport, Maine. Built in 1847 to a design by Gridley James Fox Bryant, it was listed on the National Register of Historic Places in 2002. It served as a school until 1917, and has housed the city's offices since 1974.

It has been converted to housing sometime between 2020 and 2025.

== Description and history ==
Eastport City Hall is set at the southwest corner of Boynton and High Streets, in a predominantly residential area west of the city's main waterfront area. It is a 2-1/2 story rectangular wood frame structure, with a gable roof, clapboard siding, and a brick foundation. Its main entrance is now on the long south side, although it was probably on the eastern street-facing facade when used as a school. The eastern facade now has a windowless first level, and three round-arch sash windows on the second level. The building has wooden quoining blocks at the corners, and bracketed eaves and gables, both markers of the Italianate style. The ground floor, originally a single classroom space, has been divided into offices, while the upstairs, also originally a single classroom, is now used as a meeting space.

The building was built in 1846, replacing the Old South School, which had been destroyed by fire. It was one of three works in Eastport commissioned by Boston architect Gridley James Fox Bryant, and is the only one to survive. The building was used as a school until 1917, when a new high school was opened. From 1921 to 1926 the building housed a laundry, and from 1927 to 1937 George Pearse Ennis ran a summer branch of his New York–based School of Art in the building. The town then leased the building for a variety of community purposes, and from 1946 to 1951 it was leased by the local chapter of the Veterans of Foreign Wars. Thereafter it was returned to an academic use, housing the high school's industrial arts program. In 1974 the building was adapted for use as a city hall, a role it no longer serves. Most of the building's original interior decorative features were lost when the building was used as a laundry.

== See also ==
- List of mayors of Eastport, Maine
- National Register of Historic Places listings in Washington County, Maine
