= Opposition (politics) =

Political force against the political force in charge of the government

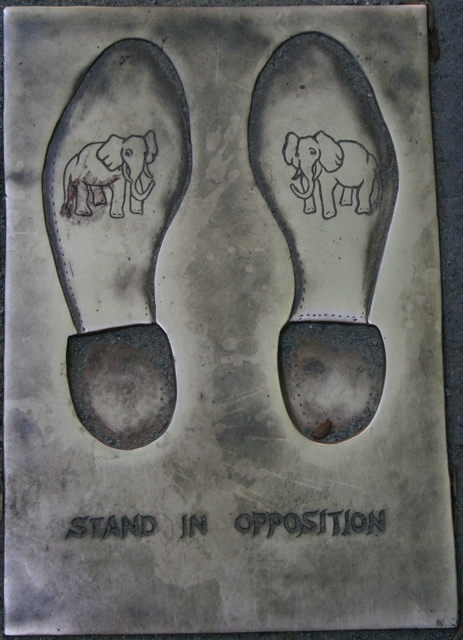
Stand in Opposition (imprints in front of Old City Hall, Boston)

In politics, the opposition comprises one or more political parties or other organized groups that are opposed to the governing party or group in political control of a city, region, state, country or other political body.

The degree of opposition varies according to political conditions. For example, in authoritarian and democratic systems, opposition may be respectively repressed or desired. Members of an opposition generally serve as antagonists to the other parties. Political opposition is generally considered a key aspect of democracy, as the opposition restrains the incumbent government and seeks to enlarge the rights available to those out of power. According to Seymour Martin Lipset, "over time, in both new and revived democracies, conflict between the governing and opposition parties helps establish democratic norms and rules."

== Research on political opposition ==
Scholarship focusing on opposition politics did not become popular or sophisticated until the mid-20th century. Recent studies have found that popular unrest regarding the economy and quality of life can be used by political opposition to mobilize and to demand change. Scholars have debated whether political opposition can benefit from political instability and economic crises, while some conclude the opposite. Case studies in Jordan align with mainstream thought in that political opposition can benefit from instability, while case studies in Morocco display a lack of oppositional mobilization in response to instability. In the Jordan case study, scholars reference opposition increasingly challenge those in power as political and economic instability proliferated whereas the opposition in Morocco did not mobilize on the instability.

As social media has become a larger part of society and culture around the world, so too has online political opposition. Online communication as a whole has also heightened the spread of clearer political opposition. Various factors like censorship, selective censoring, polarization, and echo chambers have changed the way that political opposition presents itself.

Research on opposition politics in South Asia has helped inform researchers on possibilities of democratic renewal post-backsliding as well as possibilities of political violence. Despite there being aggressive and powerful regimes in place in various South Asian countries, the opposition can still pose a powerful counter-party. For example, opposition members in Nepal have made their way into office and Sri Lanka has hosted elections in regions which had not previously. In these cases, the presence of opposition has brought about positive democratic change.

== Controlled opposition ==
A controlled opposition is a party or group that stands as a placeholder for the opposition in elections, but who are ultimately completely ineffective or covertly under the influence of the dominant ruling party. This allows for all politics to be "controlled" by the ruling parties, while allowing for the illusion of multi-party elections.

== See also ==
- Leader of the Opposition
- Parliamentary opposition
- Political dissent
- The Establishment
- Ruling party
- Resistance movement
