= Front Street Block =

- U.S. National Register of Historic Places
- U.S. Historic district
- U.S. Historic district – Contributing property
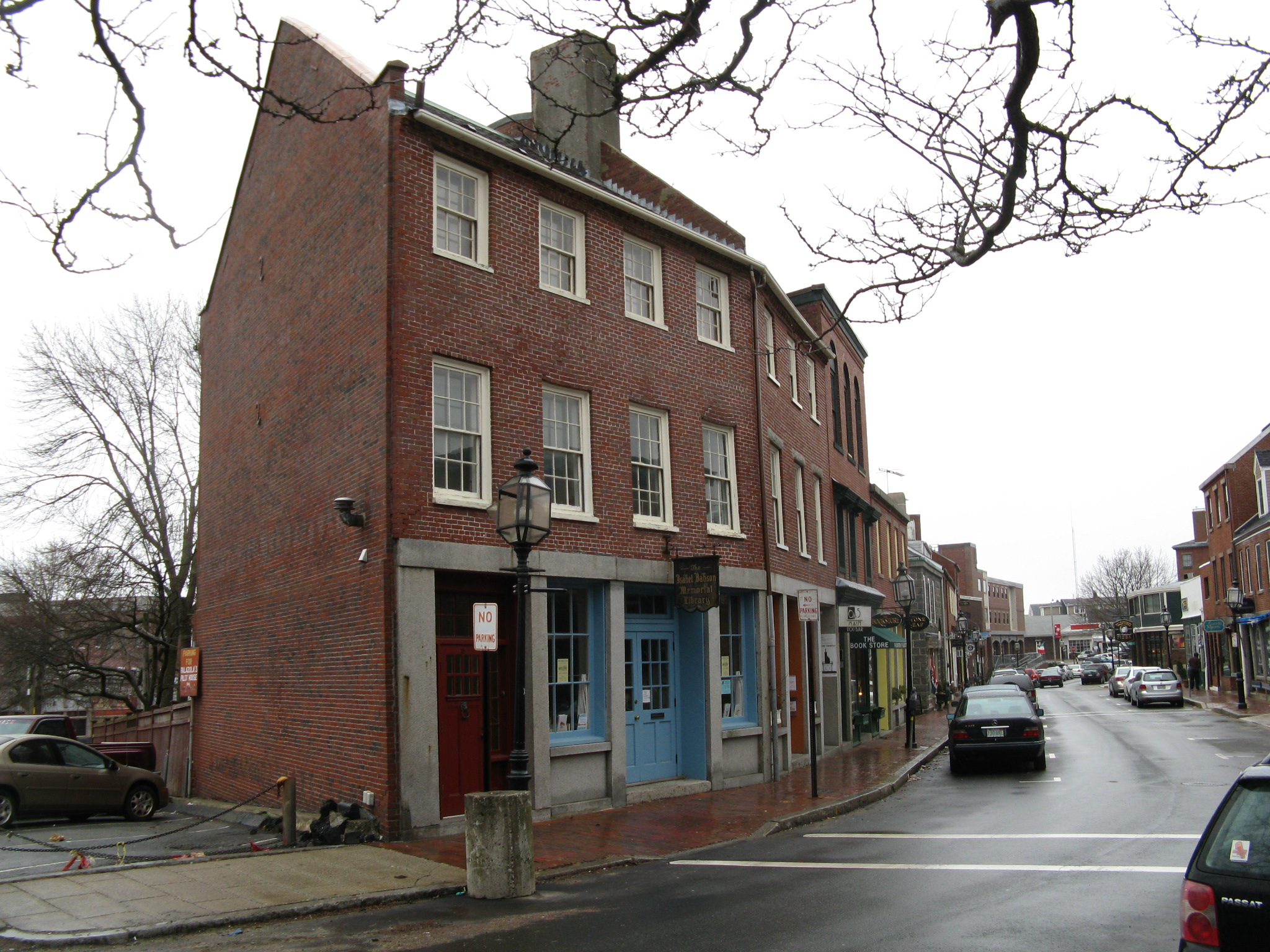
- Front Street Block

- Location within Massachusetts Location within the United States
- Location: Gloucester, Massachusetts
- Coordinates: 42°36′45″N 70°39′55″W
- Built: 1831
- Architectural style: Late Victorian, Federal
- Part of: Central Gloucester Historic District (ID82001881)
- NRHP reference No.: 74000369

Significant dates
- Added to NRHP: May 8, 1974
- Designated CP: July 8, 1982

The Front Street Block is a series of four connected commercial blocks in the West End of Gloucester, Massachusetts, USA. They were built in 1831 after a fire had devastated Gloucester's downtown the previous year.

- 69–71 Main Street, a three-story four wide block with Federalist styling, was built for Aaron Day. A hat maker operated on the ground floor, and apartments were above.
- 65–67 Main Street, a three-story four wide block with Federalist styling, was built for Samuel Bulkley. A "tin manufactory" operated on the ground floor, and there were apartments above. This building shared a wall with 69–71.
- 61–63 Main Street, also three stories and four wide, was built for William Babson, Jr., and had a shop on the ground floor with apartments above. In 1890 this building was renovated, giving it a new Victorian facade, and an enlarging addition to the rear.
- 55–59 Main Street is distinct from the other three buildings in being only two stories, and for having a hipped roof. It was built for Henry Smith, and first housed a cabinet maker on the ground floor, with living space above.

They were collectively listed as a historic district on the National Register of Historic Places in 1974, and further included in the Central Gloucester Historic District in 1982.

== See also ==
- National Register of Historic Places listings in Gloucester, Massachusetts
- National Register of Historic Places listings in Essex County, Massachusetts
