= Gloucester City Hall =

- U.S. National Register of Historic Places
- U.S. Historic district – Contributing property
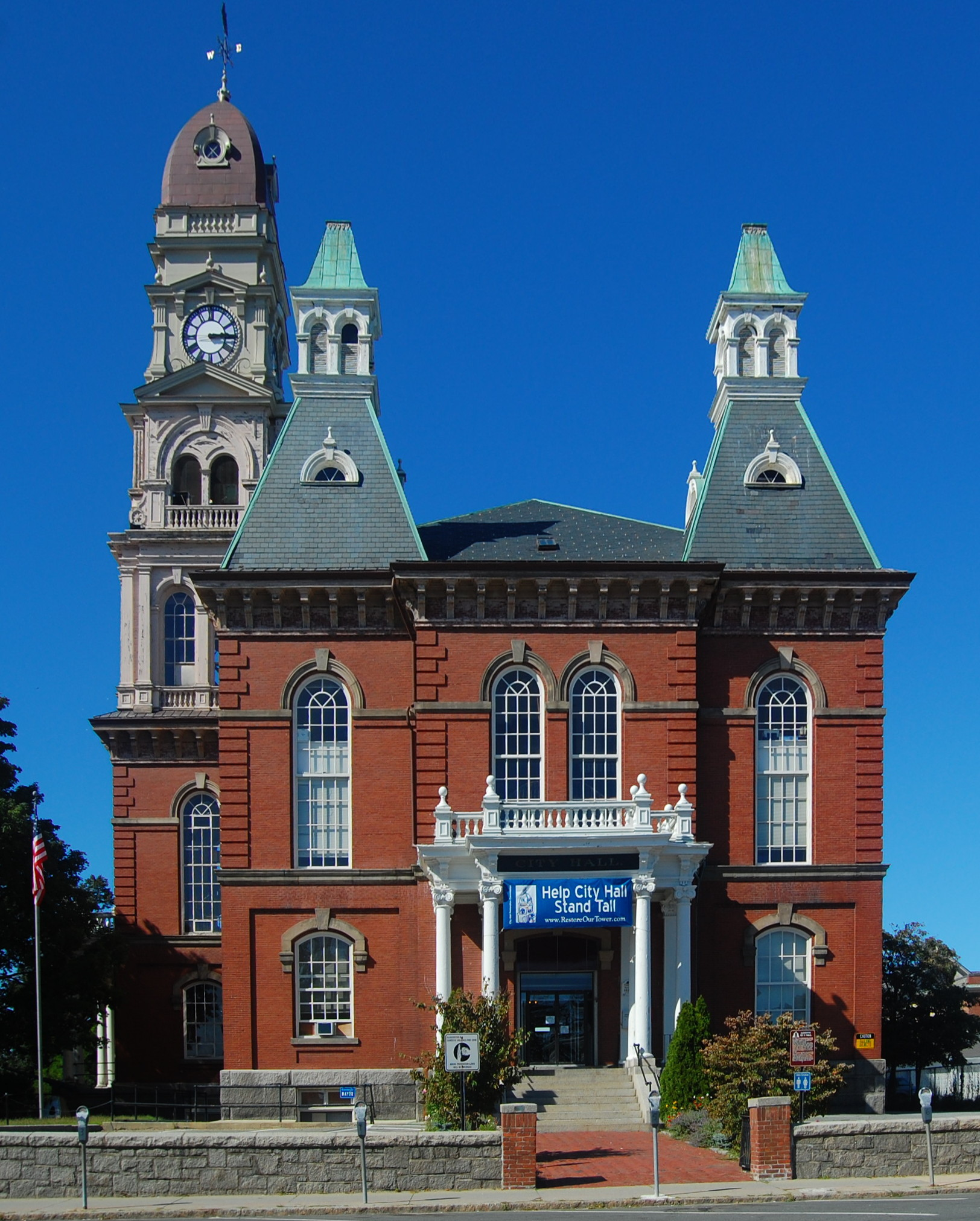
- Gloucester City Hall

- Location within Massachusetts Location within the United States
- Location: Gloucester, Massachusetts
- Coordinates: 42°36′50″N 70°39′47″W
- Built: 1869
- Architect: Gridley James Fox Bryant, Louis P. Rogers
- Architectural style: Second Empire
- Part of: Central Gloucester Historic District (ID82001881)
- NRHP reference No.: 73000297

Significant dates
- Added to NRHP: May 8, 1973
- Designated CP: July 8, 1982

Gloucester City Hall is located at 9 Dale Avenue in Gloucester, Massachusetts. It was built in 1870 and dedicated the following year, and has served as the main location for the city's offices since then. Built to a design by Bryant and Rogers, it is a two-story Second Empire brick building. Each of the rectangular building's four corners is topped by its own pyramidal roof structure, above which is a small rectangular cupola with its own roof. Centered on the front elevation is a clock tower that is brick in its lower levels, and decorated wood above, ending in a copper dome.

The building was listed on the National Register of Historic Places in 1973, and included in the Central Gloucester Historic District in 1982.

== See also ==
- National Register of Historic Places listings in Gloucester, Massachusetts
- National Register of Historic Places listings in Essex County, Massachusetts
