= List of mayors of Eastport, Maine =

The following is a list of mayors and council presidents of the city of Eastport, Maine, United States.

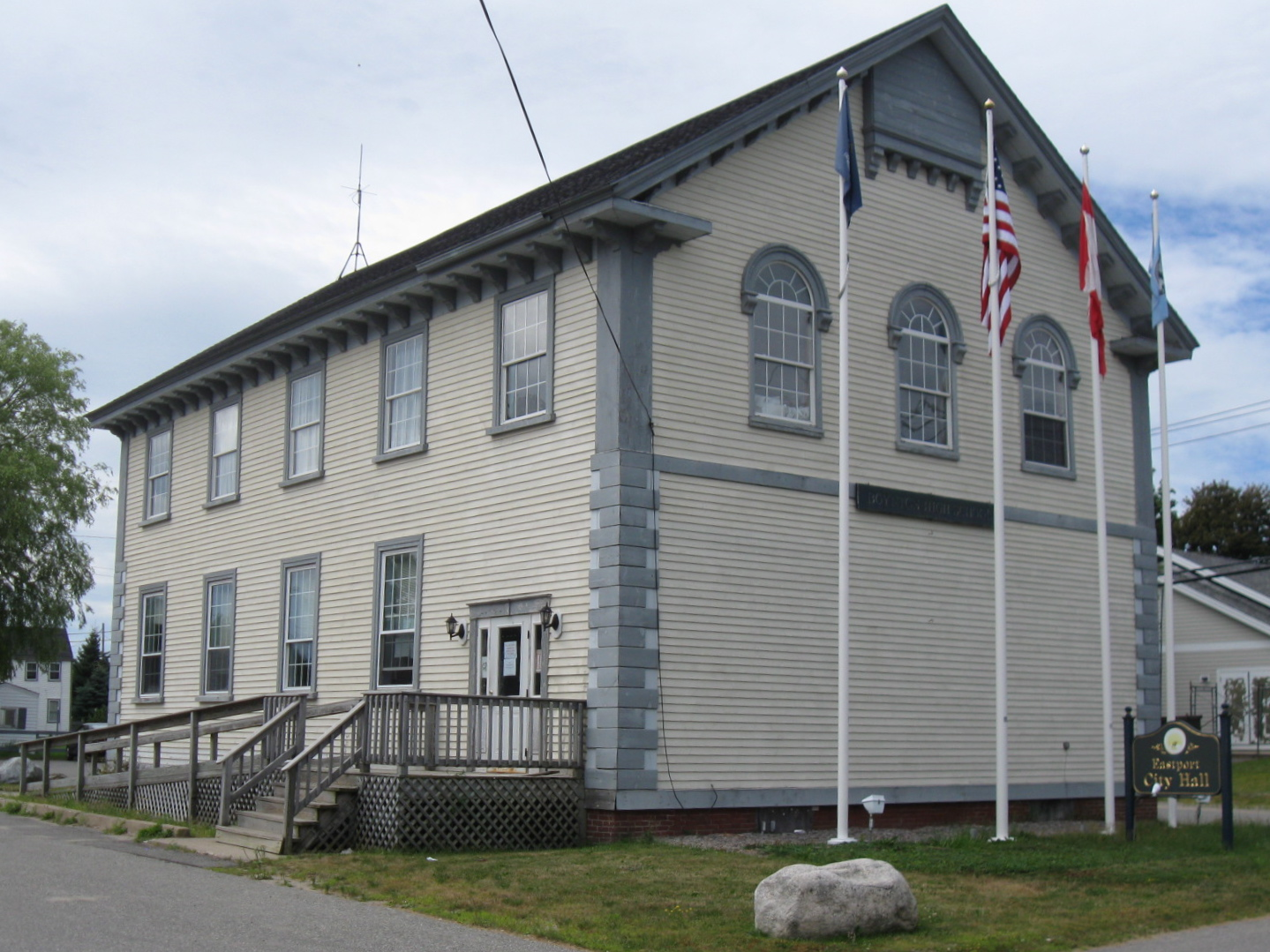
View of city hall building in Eastport, Maine, 2012

== Mayors ==
- S. D. Leavitt, 1893, 1898–1900
- C. W. Hume, 1894–1896
- W. F. Cleveland, 1897
- C. M. Buxton, 1901–1902
- W. S. Mildon, 1903
- J. H. McFaul, 1904
- Albert Greenlaw, 1905–1906
- J. M. Swett, 1907, 1912
- A. H. Leavitt, 1908
- Walter J. Garnett, 1909–1911
- John P. Hutchison, 1913
- Edgar M. Cherry, 1914–1915
- Fred T. Eldredge, 1916–1918
- Edward C. Firth, 1919, 1924–1925
- John N. Henward, 1920–1921
- Fred B. Spear, 1922
- Edward F. Heffron, 1923
- Frank A. Havey, ca.1926–1927
- Roscoe C. Emery, ca.1928–1931
- Wallace F. Mabee, ca.1932–1933
- Fay B. Reilly, ca.1933–1934
- Roscoe C. Emery, ca.1935–1936

== City council presidents/chairs ==
At the start of each year, the city council elects "by majority vote one of its members as president of the council."

- Ruth McInnis, ca.2003
- Brian Schuth, ca.2008
- Robert Peacock, ca.2011
- Mary Repole, ca.2015
- Gilbert Murphy, ca.2018
- William Boone, ca.2024

== See also ==
- Eastport City Hall
- Eastport history
