= Arthur Gilman =

American architect

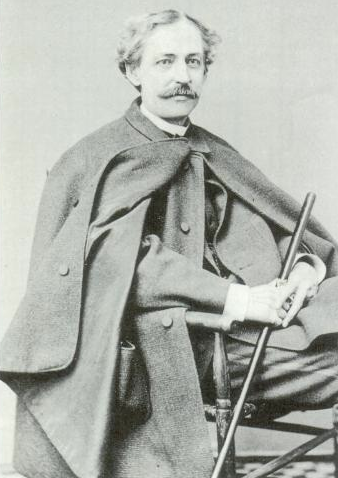
- Portrait of Gilman, circa 1870
- Born: Arthur Delevan Gilman; November 5, 1821; Newburyport, Massachusetts, U.S.
- Died: July 11, 1882 (aged 60); Syracuse, New York, U.S.
- Occupation: Architect

Arthur Delevan Gilman FAIA (November 5, 1821, Newburyport, Massachusetts – July 11, 1882, Syracuse, New York) was an American architect, designer of many Boston neighborhoods, and member of the American Institute of Architects.

== Life and career ==
Gilman was a descendant of Edward Gilman, Sr., one of the first settlers of Exeter, New Hampshire. Gilman was educated at Trinity College in Hartford, Connecticut. In 1844, he published a paper on "American Architecture" in the North American Review, which was translated into several foreign languages. He was then invited to deliver twelve lectures before the Lowell Institute, Boston, after which he went to Europe on a tour of professional observation.

On his return to Boston, he advocated filling in the Back Bay district, urging this plan for years before his views were carried out by the state. Here Gridley James Fox Bryant was his colleague. Commonwealth Avenue, now one of the finest streets in the world, is due almost entirely to his persistent efforts, along with Frederick Law Olmsted. Gilman designed the H. H. Hunnewell house (1851) in Wellesley (then West Needham), St. Paul's Church in Dedham, Massachusetts, and, with Bryant, the Old City Hall in Boston (1862–65).

In 1865, he moved to New York City, where he designed the original Equitable Insurance Company's building, the Bennett Building for The New York Herald, and St. John's Church and parsonage circa 1869 in Clifton, Staten Island.

== Works ==
In addition to the projects mentioned above, he also designed:

- St. Paul's Church (1858), Dedham, Massachusetts
- Christ Church (1860), Brookline, Massachusetts
- Horticultural Hall (1865), Tremont St., Boston, Massachusetts, with Bryant
