= Democratic Donkey (statue) =

Statue in Boston, Massachusetts, U.S.

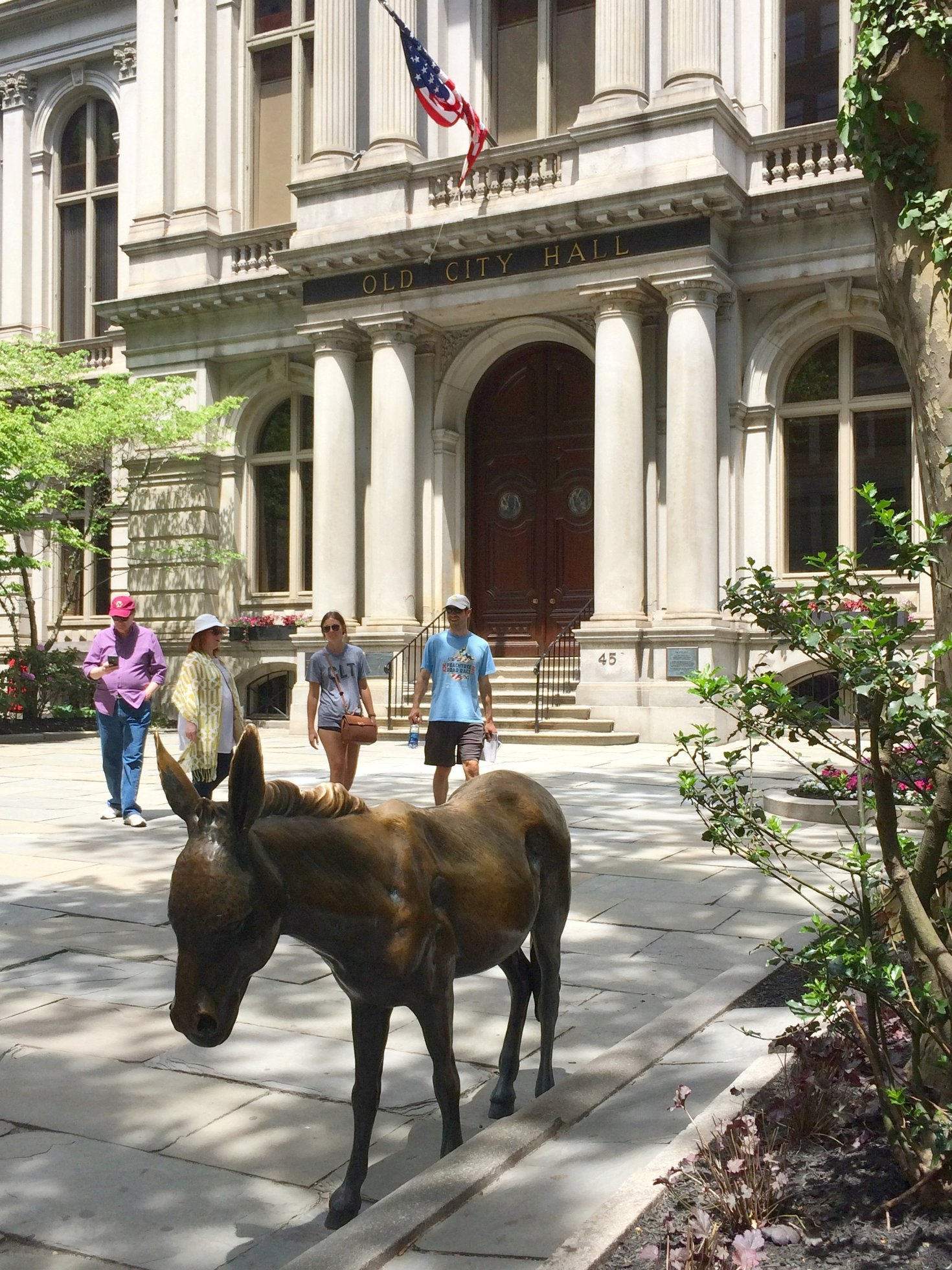
- The statue in 2018
- Location: Boston, Massachusetts, U.S.; 42°21′28.2″N 71°3′34.1″W

A statue of a donkey, sometimes called Democratic Donkey, is installed outside Boston's Old City Hall, in the U.S. state of Massachusetts. Roger Webb acquired the bronze sculpture in Florence, Italy. It was installed outside Old City Hall in 1998.

The statue stares at a couple of footprints with the Conservative elephants.
