= Central Gloucester Historic District =

Historic district in Massachusetts, United States

- U.S. National Register of Historic Places
- U.S. Historic district
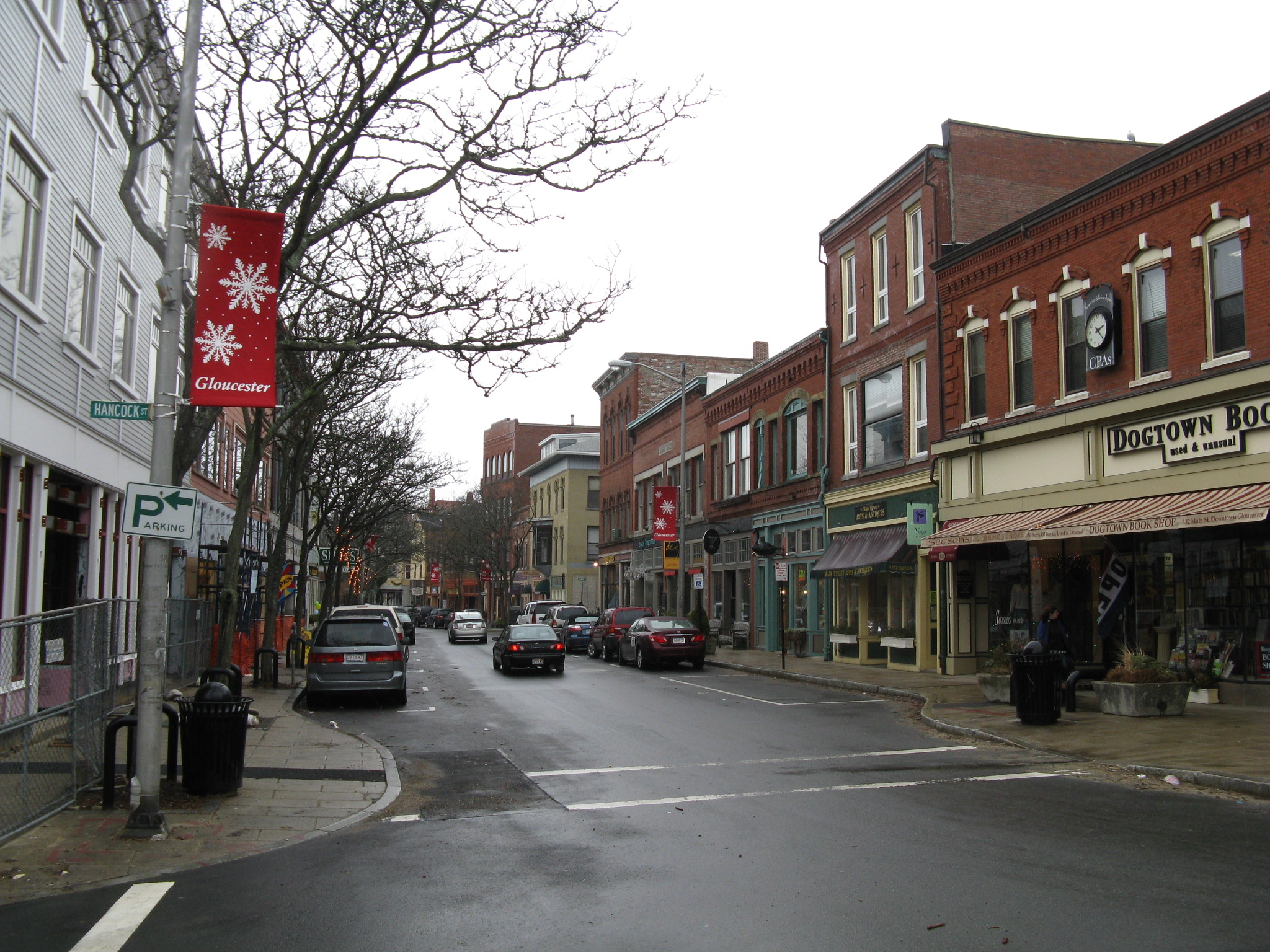
- Main Street looking west

- Location within Massachusetts Location within the United States
- Location: Gloucester, Massachusetts
- Coordinates: 42°36′46″N 70°39′55″W
- Architect: Multiple
- Architectural style: Greek Revival, Italianate, Federal
- NRHP reference No.: 82001881
- Added to NRHP: July 8, 1982

The Central Gloucester Historic District encompasses the historic commercial, civic, and residential core of the fishing community of Gloucester, Massachusetts. Now largely defined by 19th century architectural trends, it includes the city's commercial downtown (Main Street), its civic heart on Dale and Prospect Streets, and some adjacent residential areas. It was added to the National Register of Historic Places in 1982.

== Description and history ==
Gloucester, which takes up much of Cape Ann on the northeastern coast of Massachusetts, was settled by English colonists in 1623. By the early 19th century it was well on its way to become a major fishing port, and the fishery remains an important aspect of its economy. Its downtown area is located on the north side of its inner harbor, east of the southern mouth of the Annisquam River, a tidal river separating the cape from the mainland. This area was shaped to a significant degree by major fires in 1831 and 1868, and has been impacted by 20th-century development and urban renewal.

The historic district is roughly divided into three contiguous areas. The commercial heart is located on Main Street, extending eastward from Washington Street to Pleasant Street, and a short way north on Pleasant. The civic core is just to the north, clustered on Dale Street, which runs parallel to and west of Pleasant. Adjacent to the civic core are densely set residences. Running parallel to Main Street to its north is Middle Street, where a number of high quality homes, most built before 1840, are located. At the far western end of Main and Middle Streets are also clusters of densely built residences, extending as far north as Pine Street.

Prominent buildings in the district include Gloucester City Hall, an elaborate Second Empire structure built in 1870 after the 1868 fire, and the Front Street Block, a collection of four joined buildings at the western end of Main Street, which were built after the 1831 fire.

== Gallery ==
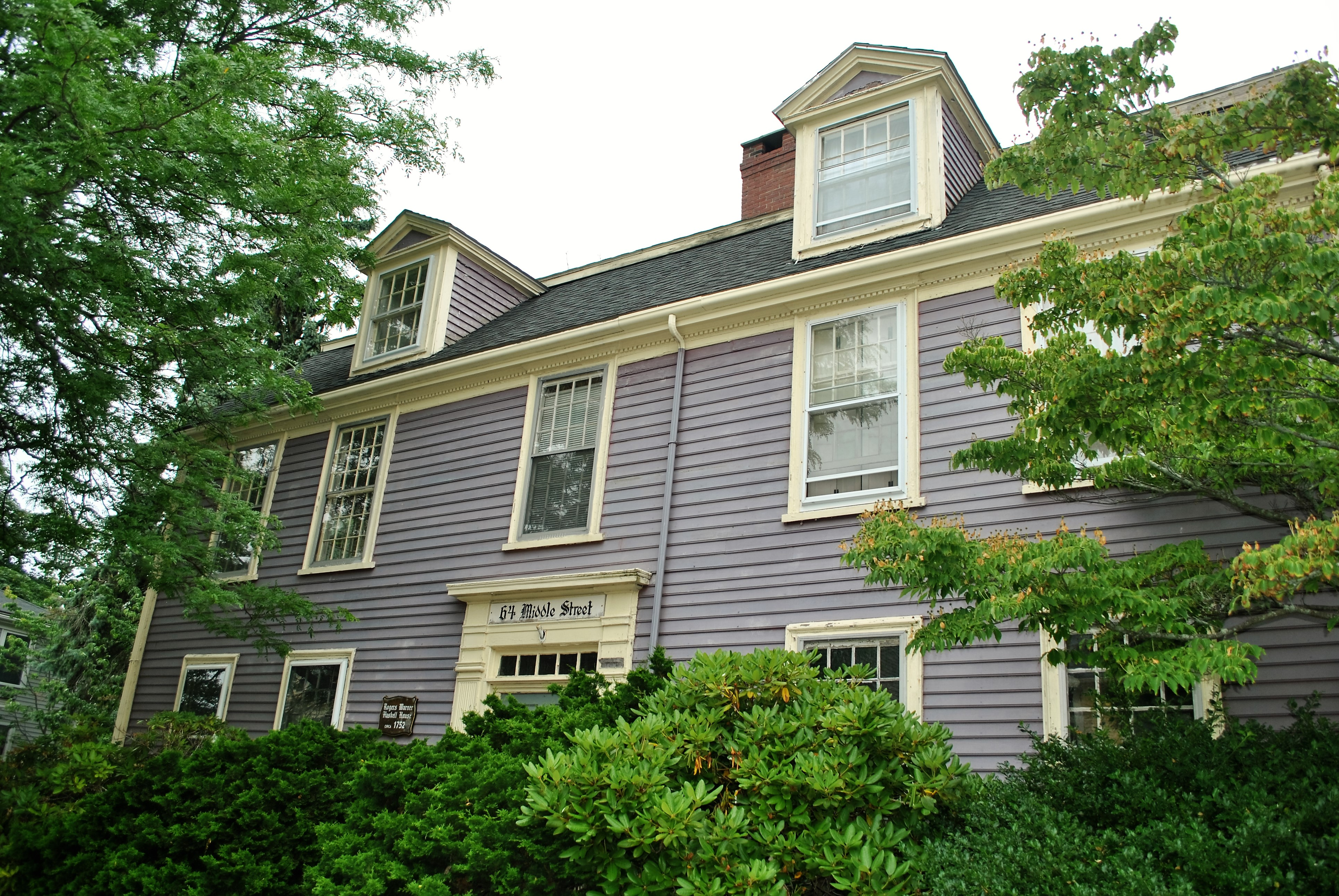
63 Middle Street]

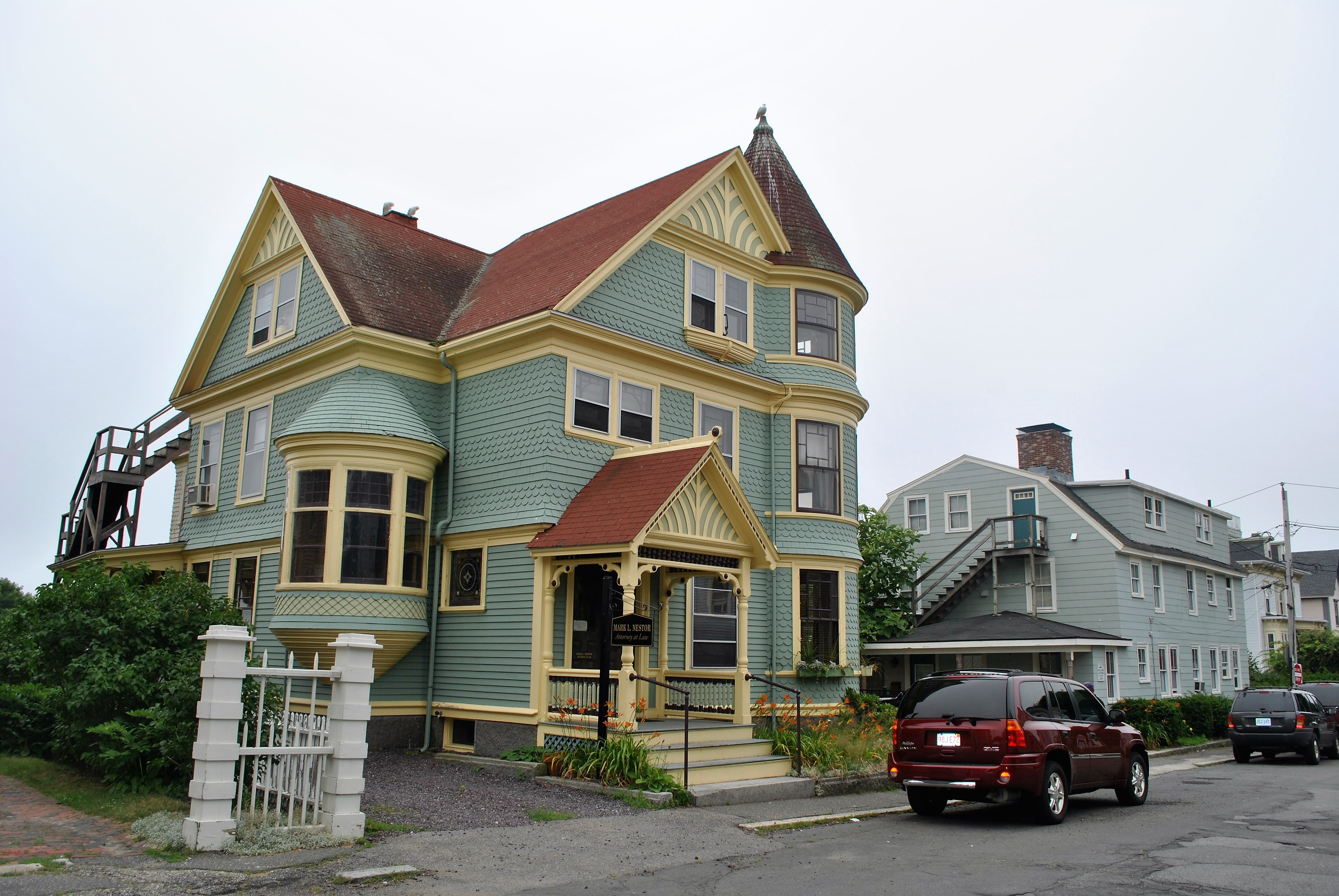
Middle Street

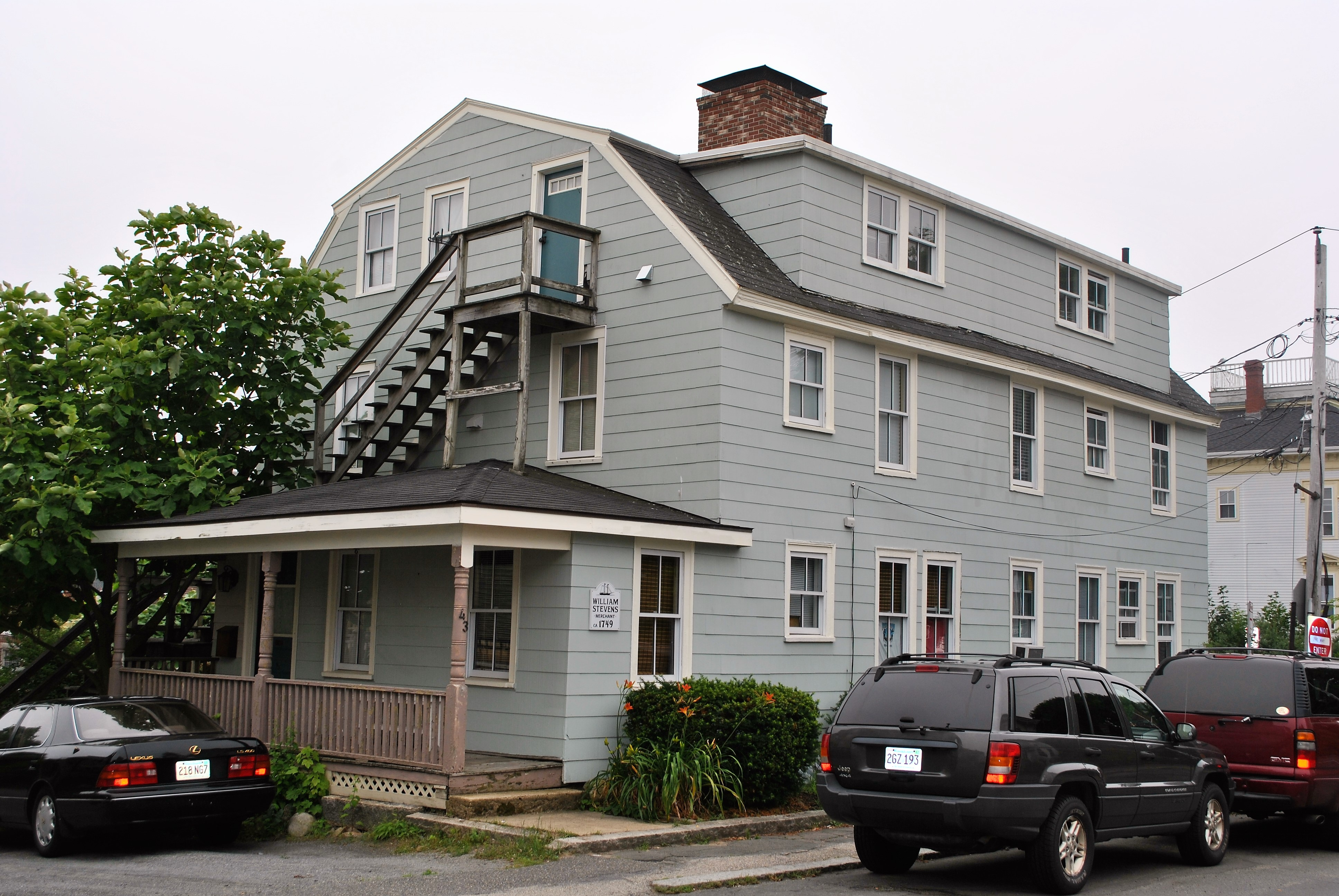
William Stevens, merchant, ca. 1749

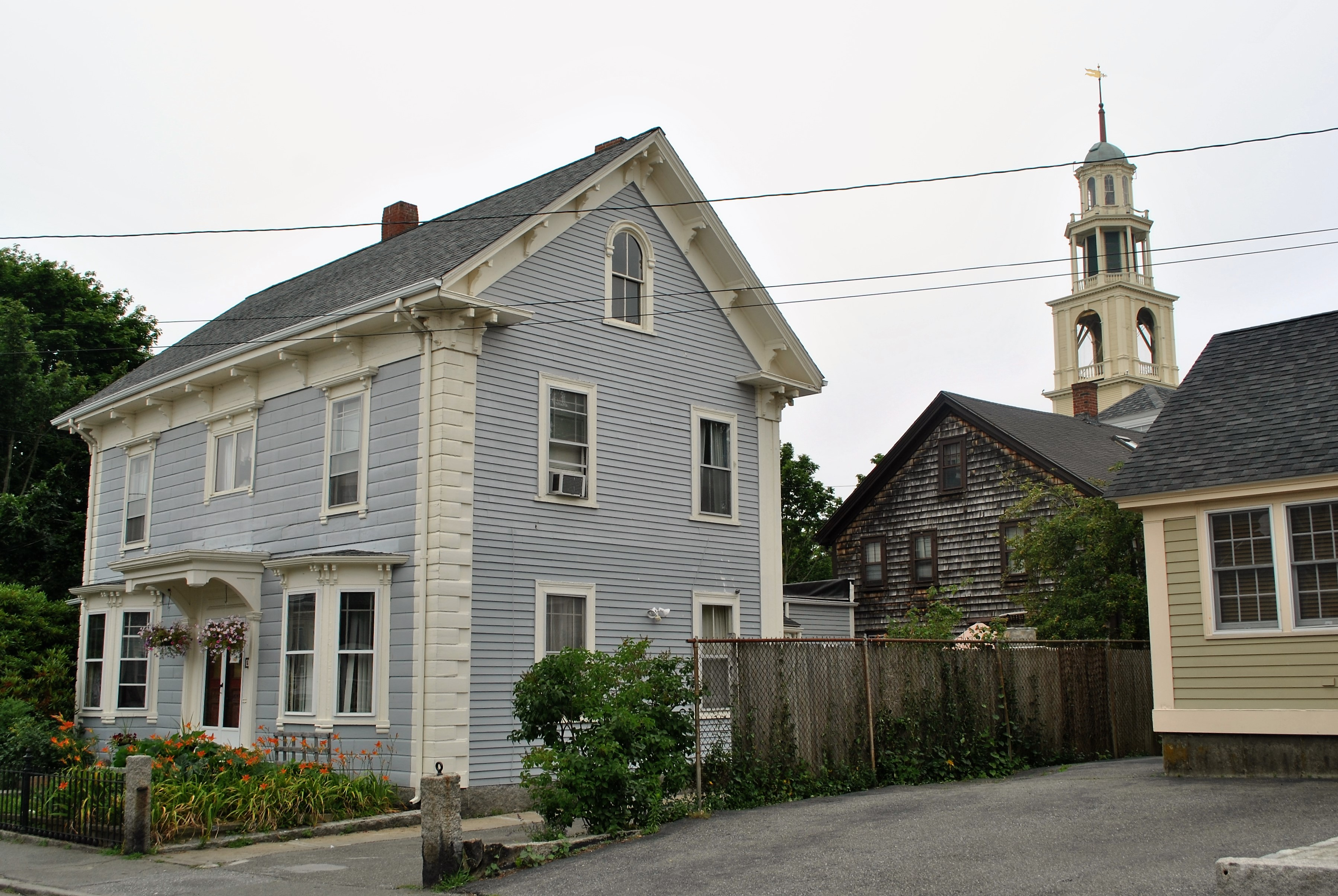
Middle Street

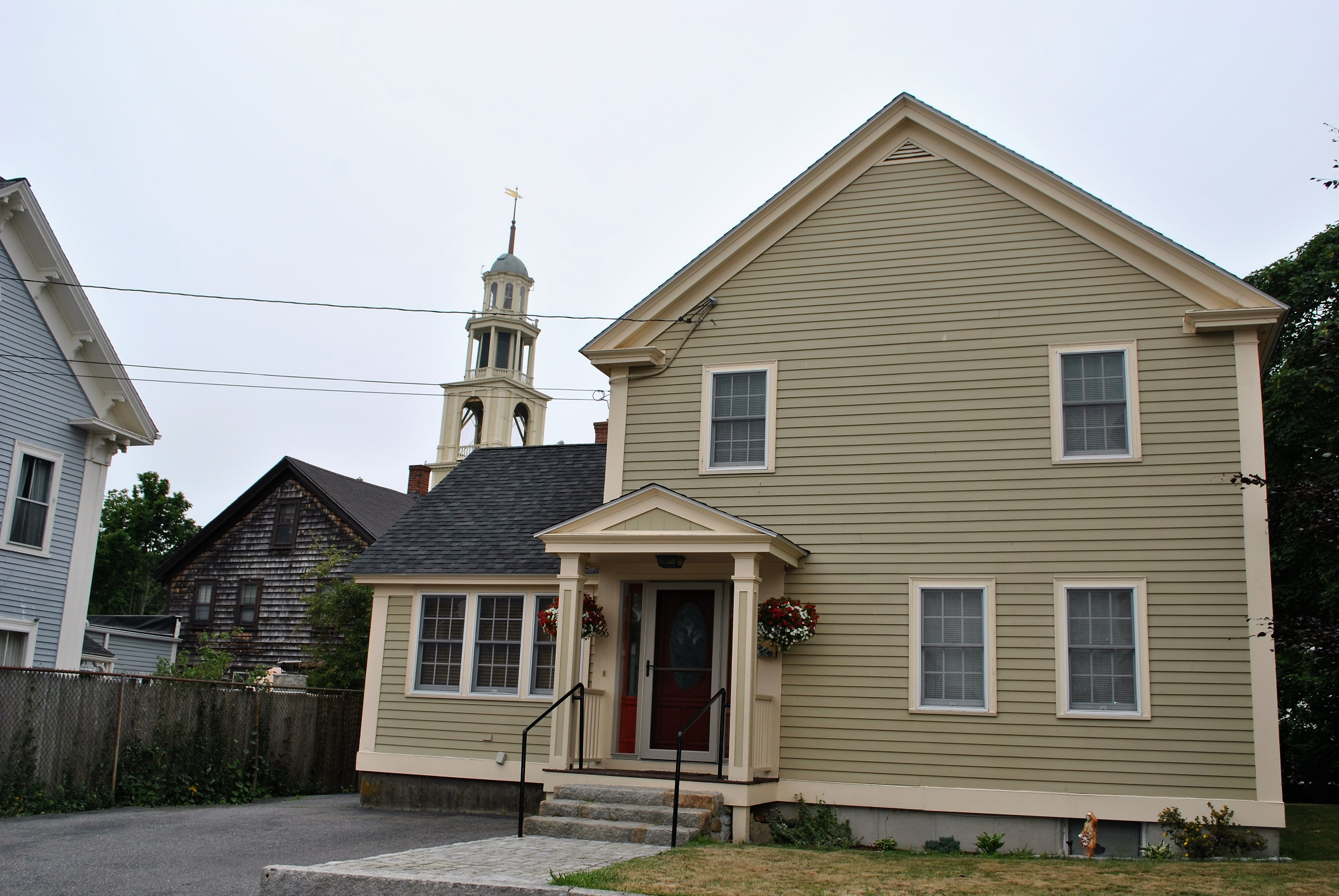
Middle Street

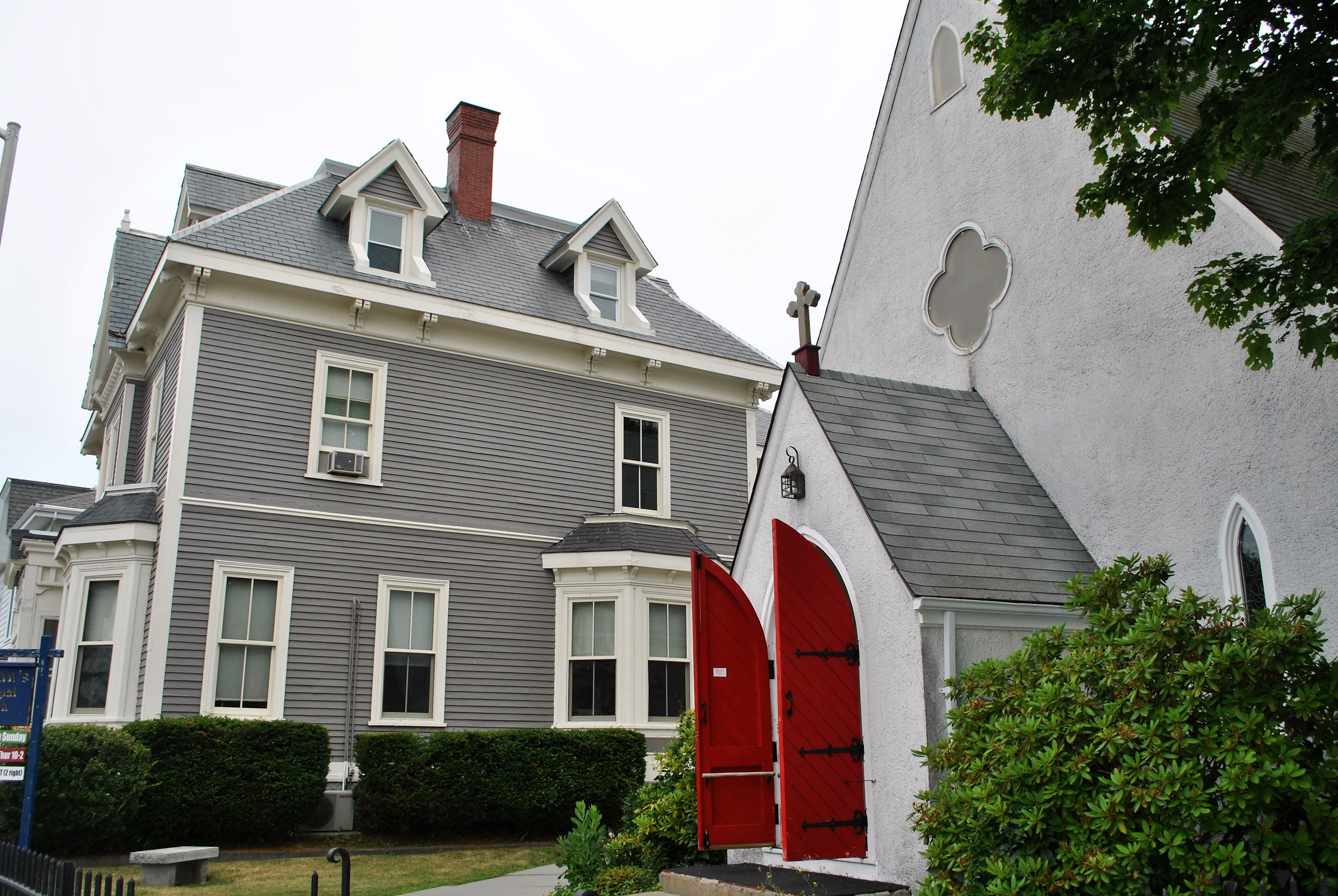
Middle Street

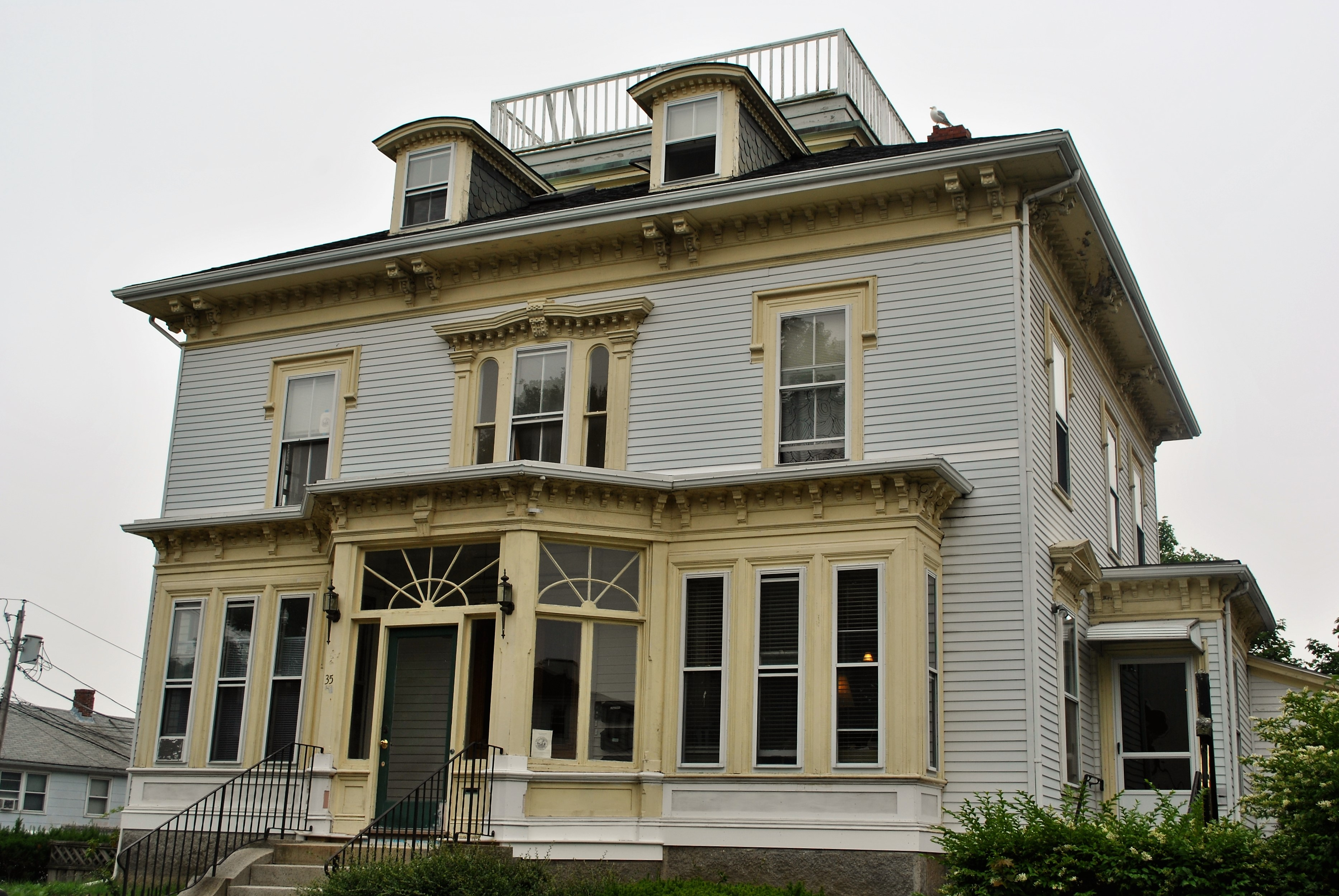
Middle Street

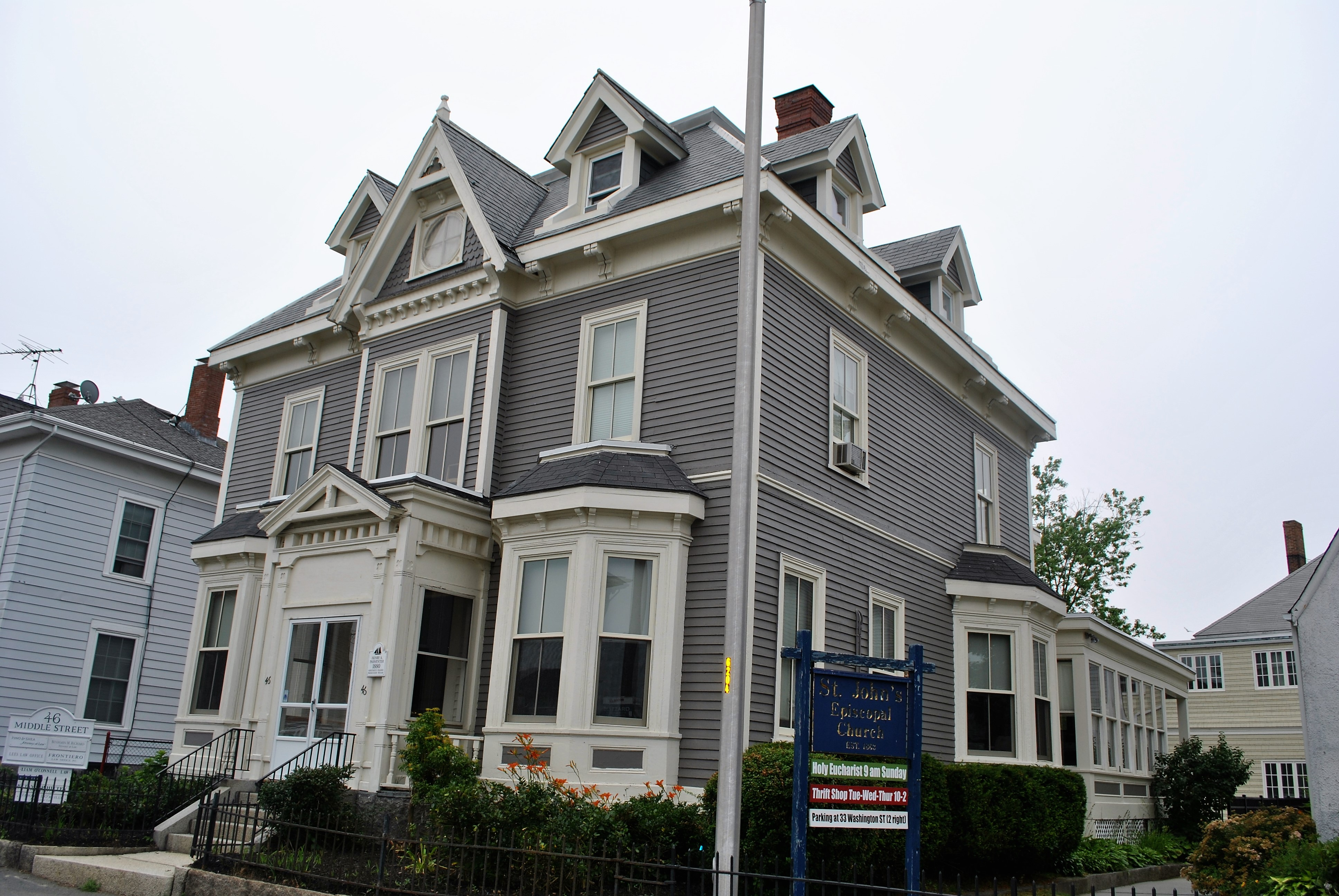
46 Middle Street

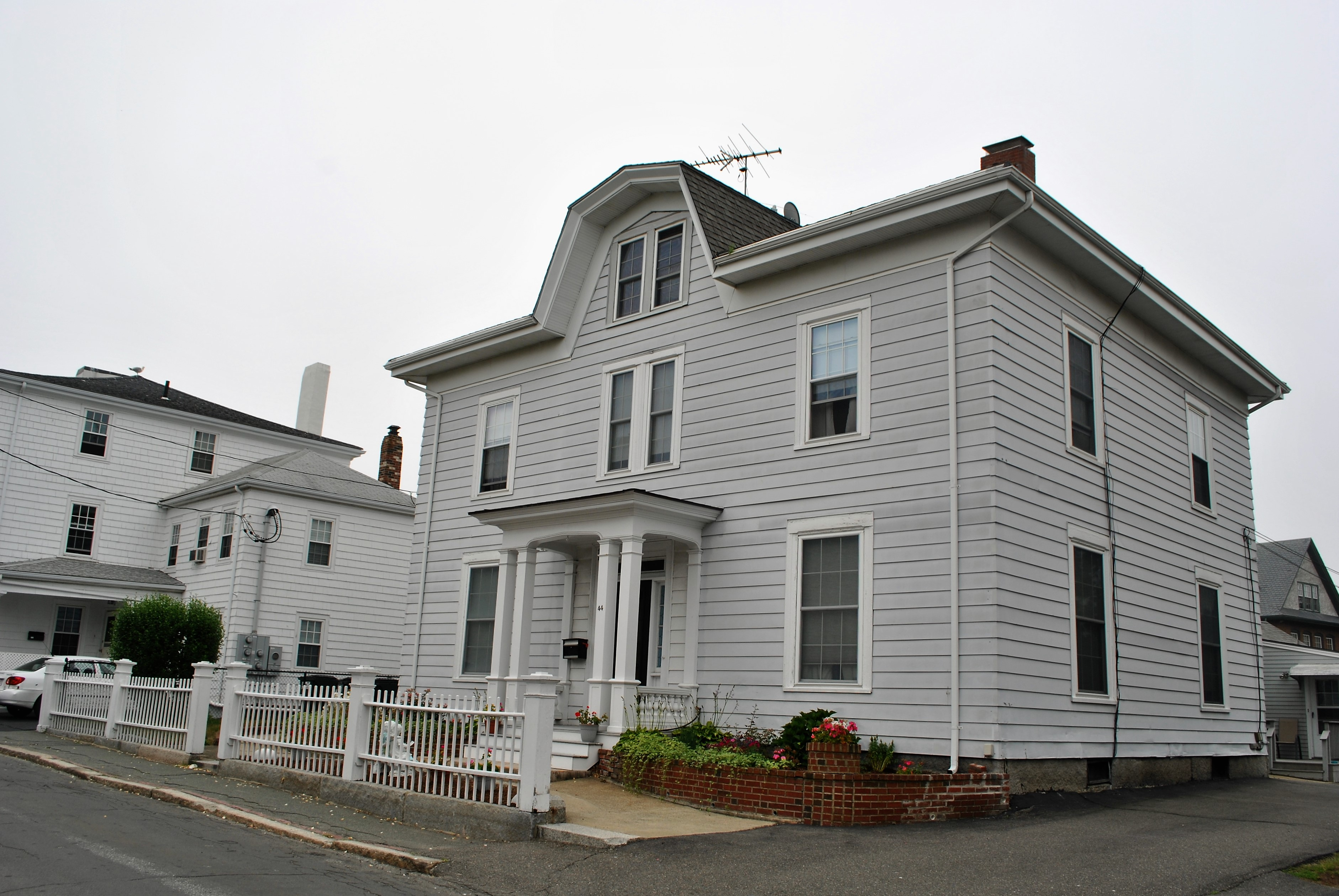
Middle Street

== See also ==
- National Register of Historic Places listings in Gloucester, Massachusetts
- National Register of Historic Places listings in Essex County, Massachusetts
