= Androscoggin County Courthouse and Jail =

- U.S. National Register of Historic Places
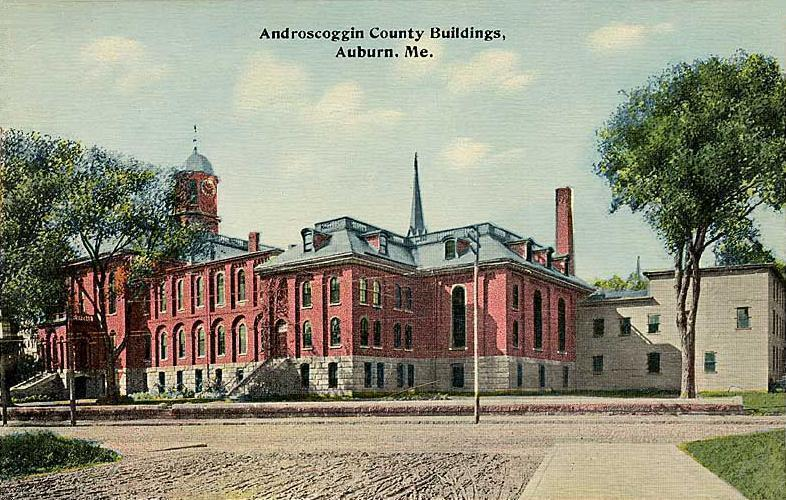

- Location within Maine Location within the United States
- Location: Auburn, Maine
- Coordinates: 44°5′52″N 70°13′38″W
- Built: 1857
- Built by: Albert Currier
- Architect: G. J. F. Bryant
- Architectural style: Renaissance
- NRHP reference No.: 83003633
- Added to NRHP: December 29, 1983

The Androscoggin County Courthouse and Jail is located at 2 Turner Street in Auburn, Maine, the county seat of Androscoggin County. The original portion of the large brick Renaissance Revival complex was designed by Gridley James Fox Bryant and was built in 1857, with a sympathetic enlargement c. 1915-20. The jail was expanded in 1970 and 1990, and is now accessed via an entrance on Pleasant Street. The complex was listed on the National Register of Historic Places in 1983 for its architecture and its association with the history of Auburn and the county, particularly with respect to the contentious debate over the choice of county seat in the 1850s.

== Description and history ==
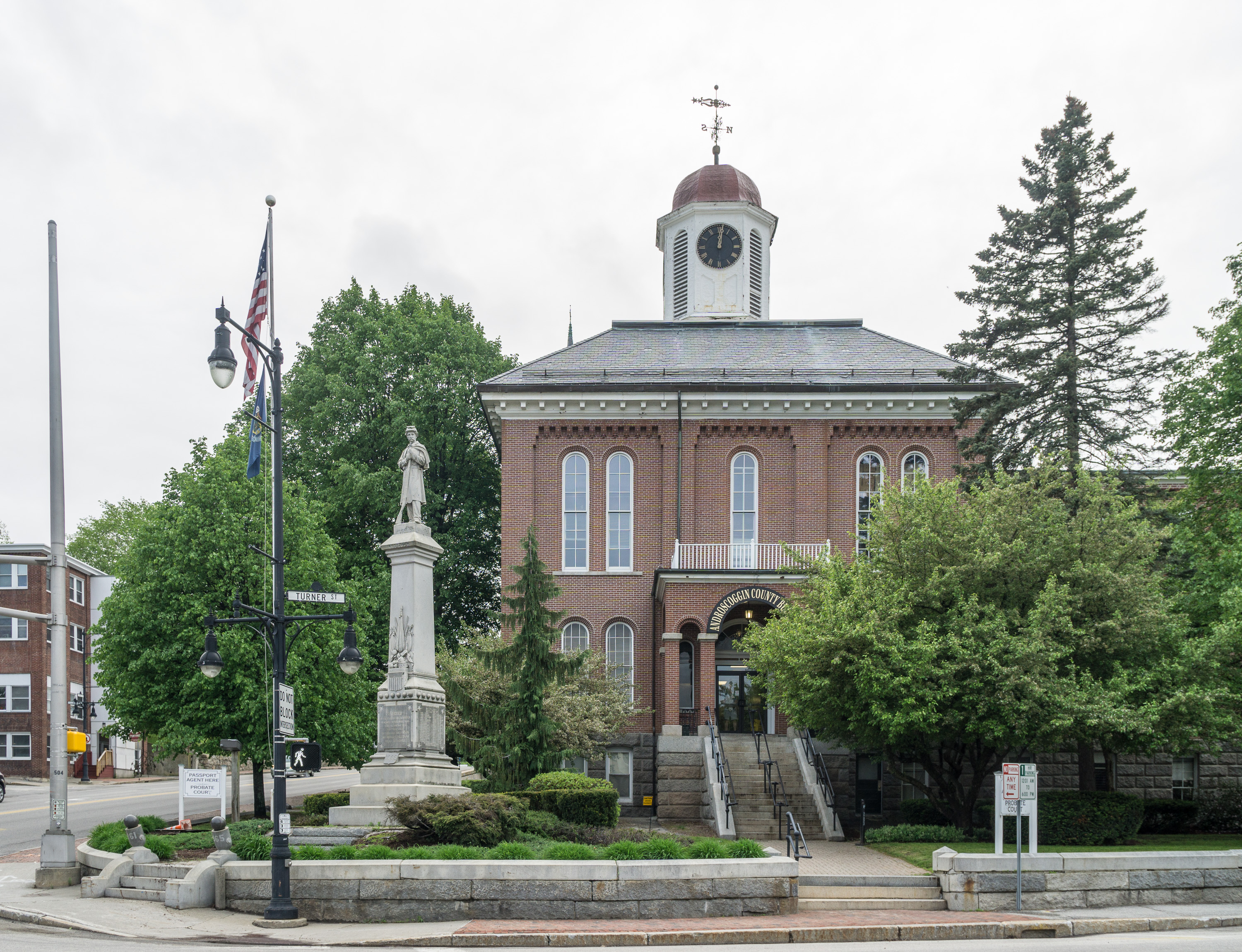
Androscoggin County Courthouse in 2017

The Androscoggin County complex occupies a significant portion of a city block in the heart of Auburn, Maine, on a rise overlooking the Androscoggin River. It is bounded on the south by Court Street, the east by Turner Street, the west by Pleasant Street, and the north by Hampshire Street. The complex shares this block with the Court Street Baptist Church and the local YMCA. The original portion of the complex occupies the southeast corner of the block, the junction of Turner and Court Streets. The main block housing the original courthouse occupies that spot, and is a rectangular structure oriented east-west, two stories in height, set on a basement that appears partially raised due to the sloping lot. The main entrance faces toward Turner Street, looking down toward the river. This section is topped by a steeply pitched hip roof and an octagonal tower with cupola, and features the most elaborate styling. A narrow two-story section extends northward from this section, joining it to a rectangular block, smaller than the courthouse, that houses the original jail. Additions have been made to the west of the connecting section and attached to the west end of the courthouse block. The jail block has a single-story extension to the rear, and is further connected to the larger modern jail facility to the west by a narrow hyphen.

Androscoggin County was formed in 1854 out of portions of four adjacent counties, primarily to address the burgeoning growth of the communities of Auburn and Lewiston, which lies just across the river. A fierce debate ensued over which would serve as the county seat, which was won by Auburn in 1854. The county commissioners sought to immediately solidify the decision, commissioning the design of this complex from Boston architect Gridley James Fox Bryant. The courthouse was ready for use in 1857. The first major addition, made in 1915-20, was that to the west end of the courthouse, done stylistically sympathetic to Bryant's design. The jail was twice enlarged, in 1970 and 1990, resulting in the modern jail facility (also faced mainly in brick) to the west of the old jail facility. The third floor of the complex is now home to the Androscoggin County Historical Society, which has a small museum there. The complex was listed on the National Register of Historic Places in 1983.

== See also ==
- National Register of Historic Places listings in Androscoggin County, Maine
