= Gridley J. F. Bryant =

American architect (1816–1899)

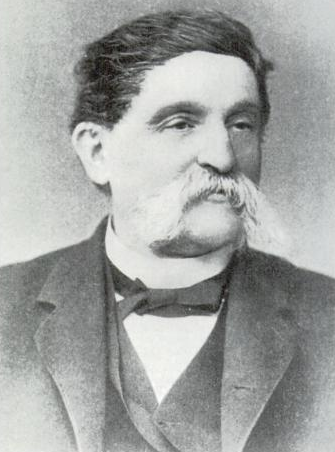
- Bryant in the 1850s
- Born: Gridley James Fox Bryant; August 29, 1816; Scituate, Massachusetts, U.S.
- Died: June 8, 1899 (aged 82); Boston, Massachusetts, U.S.
- Other names: Gridley J. F. Bryant
- Occupation: Architect
- Parent(s): Gridley Bryant (father); Maria Winship Fox (mother)
- Buildings: Massachusetts State House; Boston Old City Hall; Gloucester (Mass.) City Hall; Ballou Hall, Tufts University; Hathorn Hall, Bates College

Gridley James Fox Bryant (August 29, 1816 – June 8, 1899), often referred to as G. J. F. Bryant, was a Boston architect, builder, and industrial engineer whose designs "dominated the profession of architecture in [Boston] and New England." One of the most influential architects in New England, he designed custom-made houses, government buildings, churches, schoolhouses, and private residences across the United States, and was popular among the Boston elite. His most notable designs are foundational buildings on numerous campuses across the northeastern United States, including Tufts College, Bates College, and Harvard College. One of the pioneers of modern architecture in America, he received the most commissions in New England during the height of his career. He is also the most commissioned architect in Boston history.

A native of Massachusetts, his early life was heavily influenced by his father's work in construction engineering. His father, Gridley Bryant, built the Granite Railway, the first publicly chartered railway in the U.S. The younger Bryant received no formal training in architecture but taught himself industrial engineering and construction analysis as well as building design. Bryant's first informal mentor was Alexander Parris, who introduced him to neoclassical design and Second Empire architectural templates. His self-started firm, Bryant & Associates, was one of the most selective and popular architectural firms in New England. Bryant designed institutions providing high personal or societal value, or when sufficient payment was made to him personally, oftentimes described as "ludicrously expensive". He was the first architect to be featured on London's The Builder. A record three of his designs were featured. Such publicity propelled him into the public eye and earned him expensive and large commissions.

== Early life and education ==
Bryant was born to Maria Winship Fox and Gridley Bryant, noted railway pioneer, in Scituate, Massachusetts. In his youth the younger Bryant moved to Gardiner, Maine and attended the Gardiner Lyceum for his secondary education. He studied mathematics and engineering there before leaving joining his father's engineering office. Outside his secondary schools studies, he interned at local lithographers and artists to experiment with design and artistic manipulation.

== Life and architectural career ==
=== Early career ===
Bryant's career started at a time when few architects gained prominence in his hometown of Boston, Massachusetts, and he struggled to find commercial success in the profession. Accordingly, formal training and education in architecture was not available to him so his passion of building soon moved to him learn building design, and construction analysis at an early age all self-taught. Although the American Institute of Architects was beginning to establish itself it prompted aspiring architects to practice regulated construction and proper licensing, practices rejected by the young Bryant. Although never traveling abroad, Bryant read extensively on the architectural practices of Europe, specifically in London and Paris. The Second Empire architectural design, as seen in the Élysée Palace, played a key role in his later designs. He began informal training with fellow Boston architect Alexander Parris, who introduced him to neoclassical design and the use of Second Empire architectural templates. His training under Parris, grounded in neoclassicism, played an important role in his first building drafts. Working primarily as a student in his early days, he quickly a member of Parris' newly opened architectural firm at the corner of Court and Washington Streets. His first achievement was the design for the Broadway Savings Bank, South Boston, in the early 1830s.

Bryant flourished in an era of what Roger B. Reed calls "unregulated building," when "traditions of craftsmanship were being replaced by products of the machine age." He created a new template for the construction of buildings in New England. Early in his career, he faced competition from larger firms that sought to monopolize the design and construction of buildings in the greater Boston area. As a draftsman, he drew up minor additions and renovations to already established buildings in that city, and he struggled initially to find footing in the competitive field. At age twenty-one, amid an economic depression, he established his own architectural firm called Bryant and Associates.

== Rise to prominence ==
=== Bryant & Associates ===
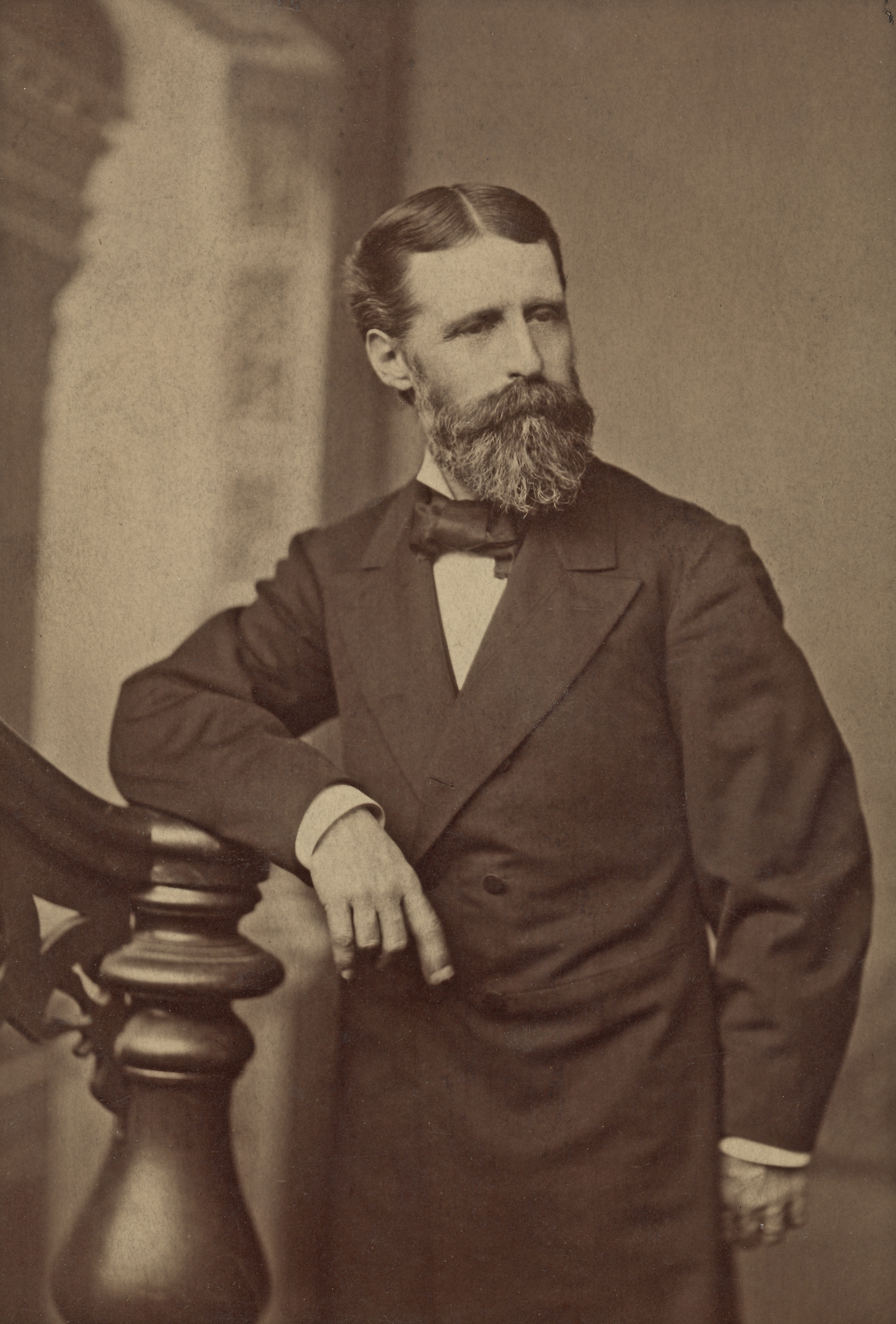
Alexander Rice Esty, frequent advisor to Bryant, helped him draft design proposals for Colby, Harvard, Bates, and Yale Colleges.

A common fault ascribed to Bryant is that he valued the art form of architecture over the commercial validity of his designs which proved to be counterproductive for his budding practice. With an understanding that a client's wishes should always come first when constructing and designing for them he, "frequently persuaded a client to spend more than he might have planned, in the interests of erecting a structure with greater aesthetic value to the community." Although his firm was relatively new and had start-up funds he worked and often collaborated with hundreds of draftsmen around the city. A notable trait of Bryant was due to the low level of economic validity to hire countless draftsmen to draw up buildings and their specification he wrote length and thoroughly detailed written specifications to describe how a building should be built. His firm utilized thousands of un-retained draftsmen throughout its life and contributed to the unprecedented amount of building being constructed throughout the United States. However, his designs specifically were reserved for high-value projects, meaning those with high personal value, societal value, or sufficiently large remuneration. Due to his firm being largely un-retained, he was able to provide guidance to his firm's operations while in other areas of the country, which contributed to increased financial success. He used the lithography he learned in secondary school to promote his firms and their projects to attract clients and donors. He was one of the first people in the city of Boston to use colored advertisements to promote his work, which contributed to even more financial success.

=== Collaborations ===
Bryant's firm attracted as partners noted architects such as Alexander Rice Esty, Edward H. Kendall, Albert Currier, Wilfred E. Mansur, Arthur Gilman and Louis P. Rogers. He worked with Albert Currier to construct the Androscoggin County Courthouse and Jail, the largest courthouse-jail building in Maine at the time. He worked with Mansur to construct Aroostook County Courthouse and Jail, the largest courthouse complex in Maine, in 1859. In 1862, he worked with Gilman to design and eventually build Boston's Old City Hall, one of the first to be built in the French Second Empire style in the United States. In 1869 he collaborated with Rogers to construct Gloucester City Hall. He also did a few luxury private residences with John Hubbard Sturgis.

== Commissions ==
=== Early commissions ===
Bryant's only known commission in the American South is Thornbury, a plantation house built in the 1840s for Henry King Burgwyn in Northampton County, North Carolina.

Together with Arthur Gilman, Bryant's firm devised the gridiron street pattern of Boston's Back Bay, laid out starting in the late 1850s.

Bryant designed so many buildings that his practice in Boston was called the "Bryant Commission." His largest commissions were from municipal and state governments, in which he worked frequently with John Hubbard Sturgis, most notably on upscale projects in the 1860s. At this time Bryant was the most commissioned architect in New England. He is also the most commissioned architect in the history of Boston. He received many commercial commissions in Boston including the Massachusetts State House, and other projects in the city's commercial district. Although his projects demanded large commissions and incurred high construction costs, he traveled often to rural areas for promotional work, and designed many lower-priced buildings providing "high societal value." Most notable was Hathorn Hall at Bates College, Maine, which he designed and which he constructed in part by himself, resulting in a net loss to him. On the other hand, larger, wealthier educational institutions like Harvard College paid him top dollar for their administration buildings—for which he was often asked to give input in their construction as well.

=== Boston fire of 1872 ===
During the Great Boston Fire of 1872, 152 of the 776 buildings destroyed had been designed by Bryant. As a measure of his reputation, he was commissioned to rebuild 110 of them.

== Style and design ==
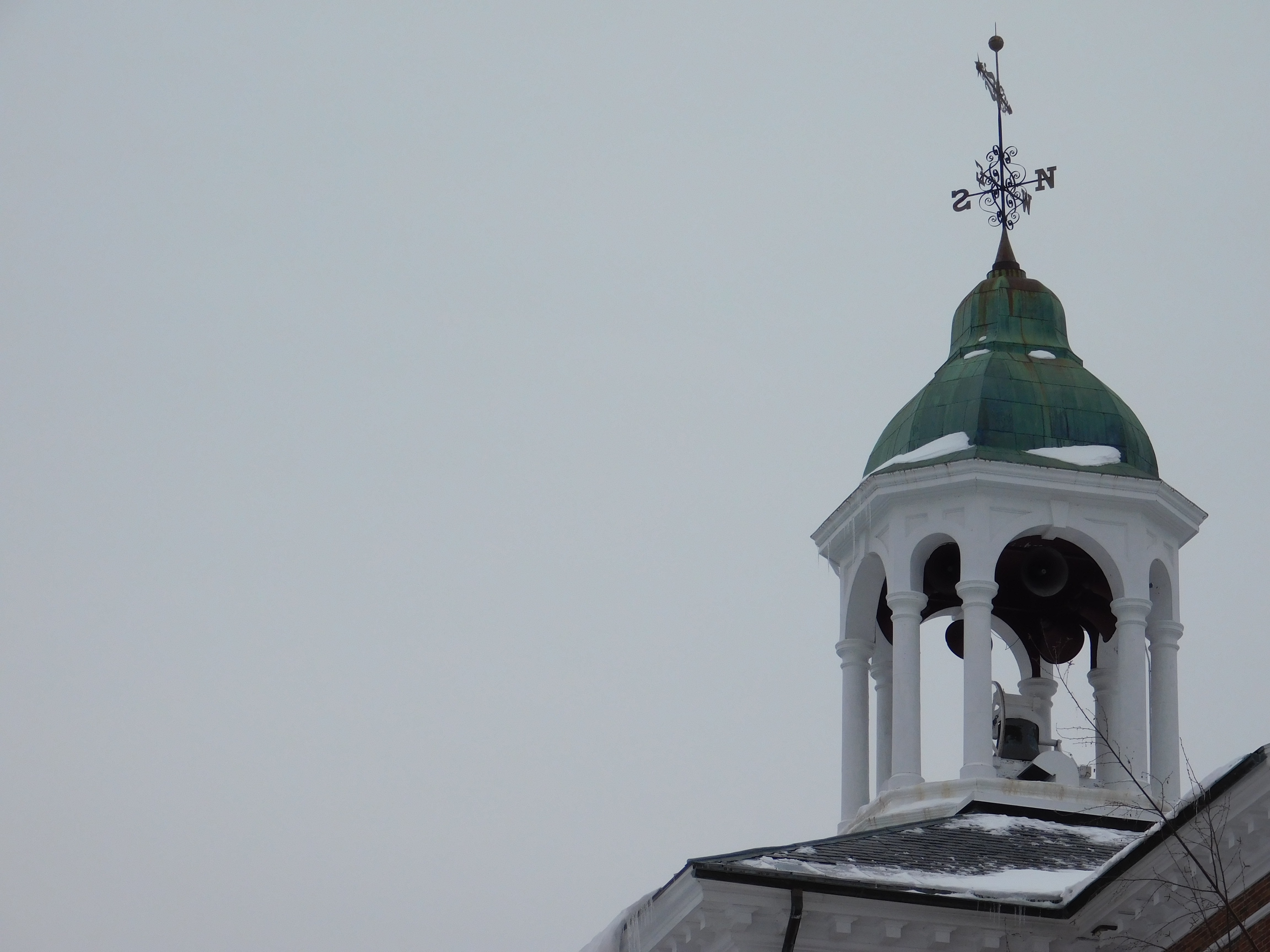
Hathorn Hall, Bates College, Maine features a mint-green bell tower.

Although brick predominated in construction in Boston at the height of Bryant's work, he often used granite for increased stability. Accordingly, Bryant was a leading proponent of the Boston "Granite Style."

Many of Bryant's buildings showcase neoclassical entrances, for example Boston's Old City Hall. As an industrial engineer and architect in New England, Bryant participated in the Colonial Revival architecture movement. Consequently, his buildings include such features as cornice-embellished moldings and multi-plane windows. White pillars, a staple of neoclassical design, can be found in the entrances of many of his buildings, including residential.

Many of his collegiate buildings feature a mint-green bell tower, and building caps and tips. This practice can be traced to 18th-century Independence Hall, Philadelphia. Many of his college buildings are in the Georgian style, constructed with wood and clapboards, their columns made of timber, framed up and turned on an oversized lathe. Bryant also designed many campus buildings featuring a red brick exterior, designed in the Georgian style, showcasing red print doors and darkened ridge sides. Moreover, in all academic buildings Bryant produced, Gothic influence can be seen as well.

== Death ==
Bryant died on June 8, 1899, in his townhouse in Boston, Massachusetts. He was survived by his wife, Louisa Bryant, whom he married on September 9, 1839. Upon his death his wife assembled all his books and drawings in his home study and burned down his house, as stipulated in his will.

== Notable buildings ==
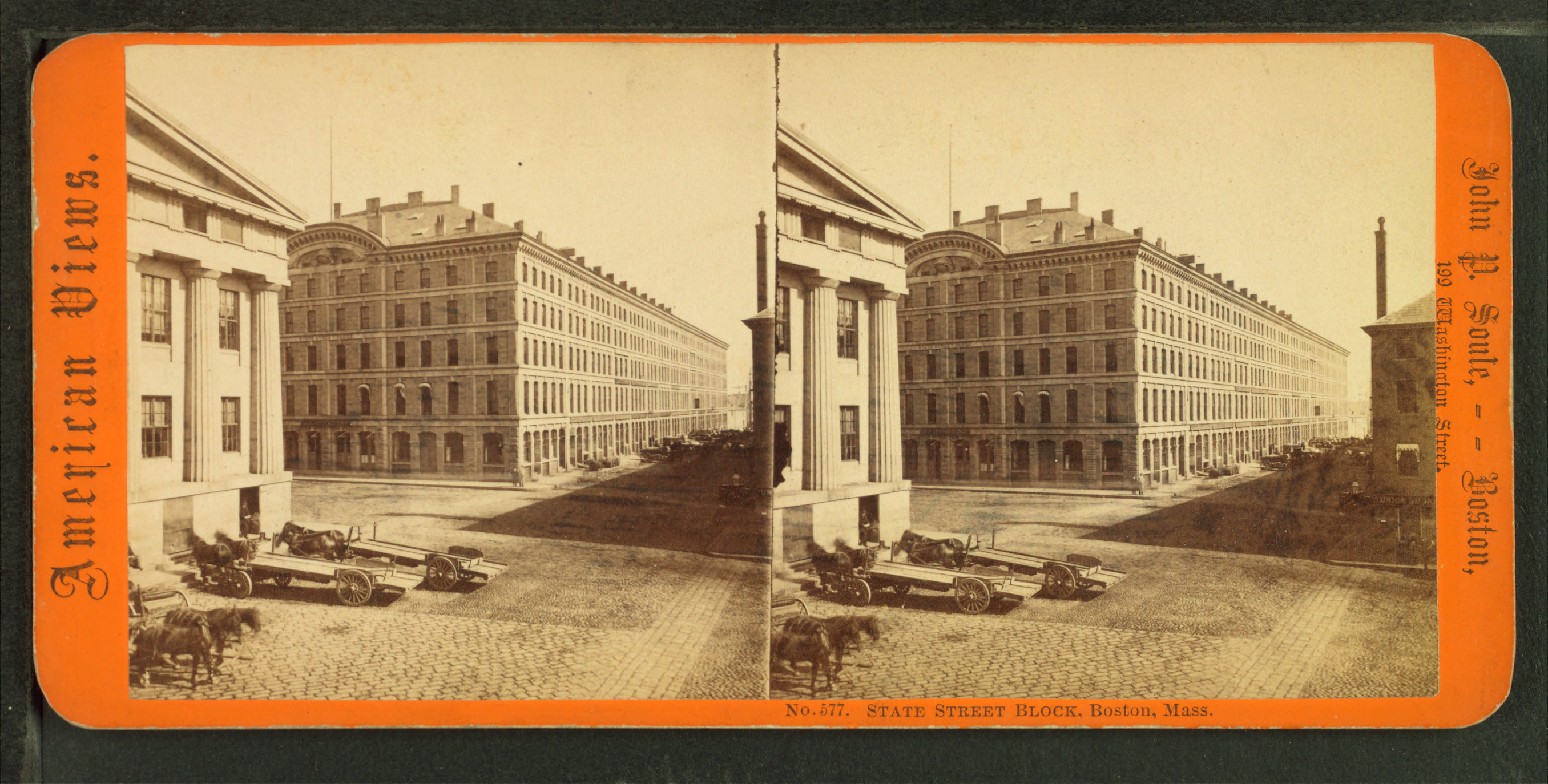
State Street Block, Boston (part still extant)

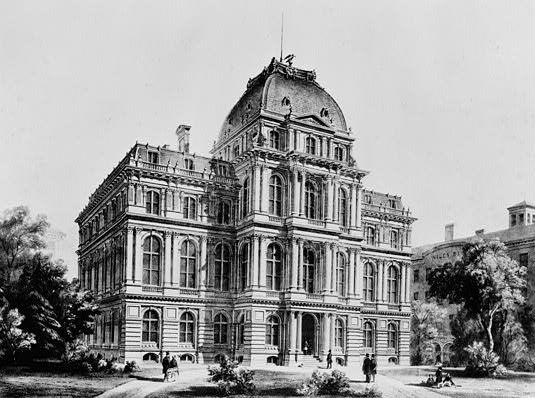
Old City Hall, Boston

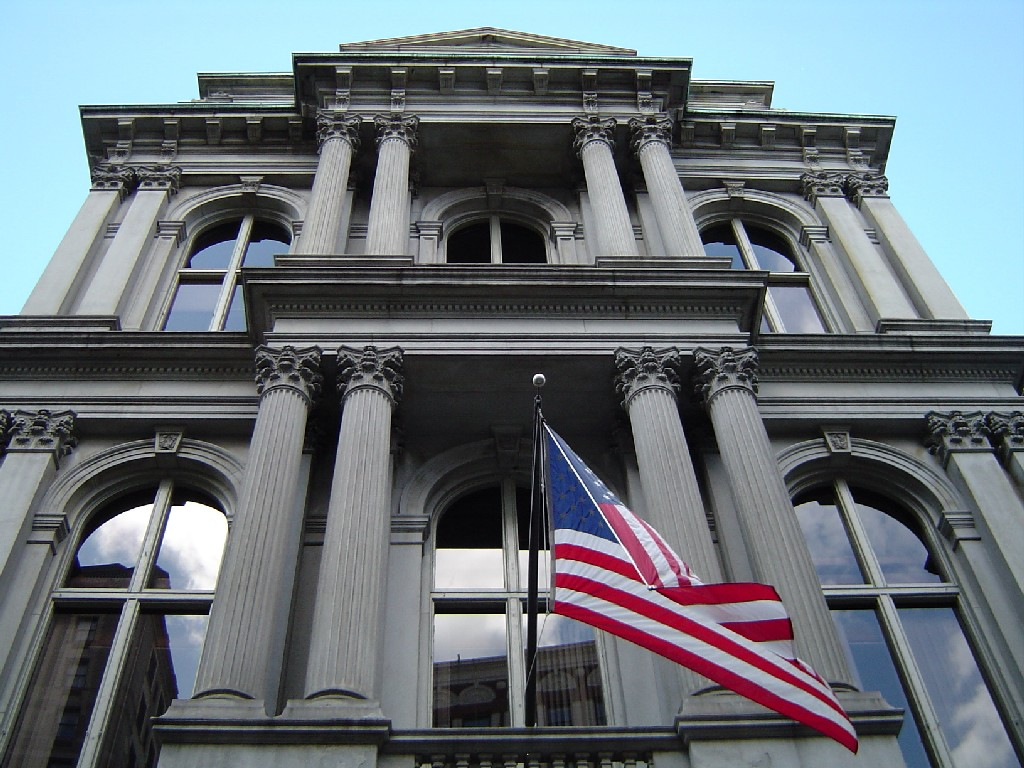
Old City Hall, Boston

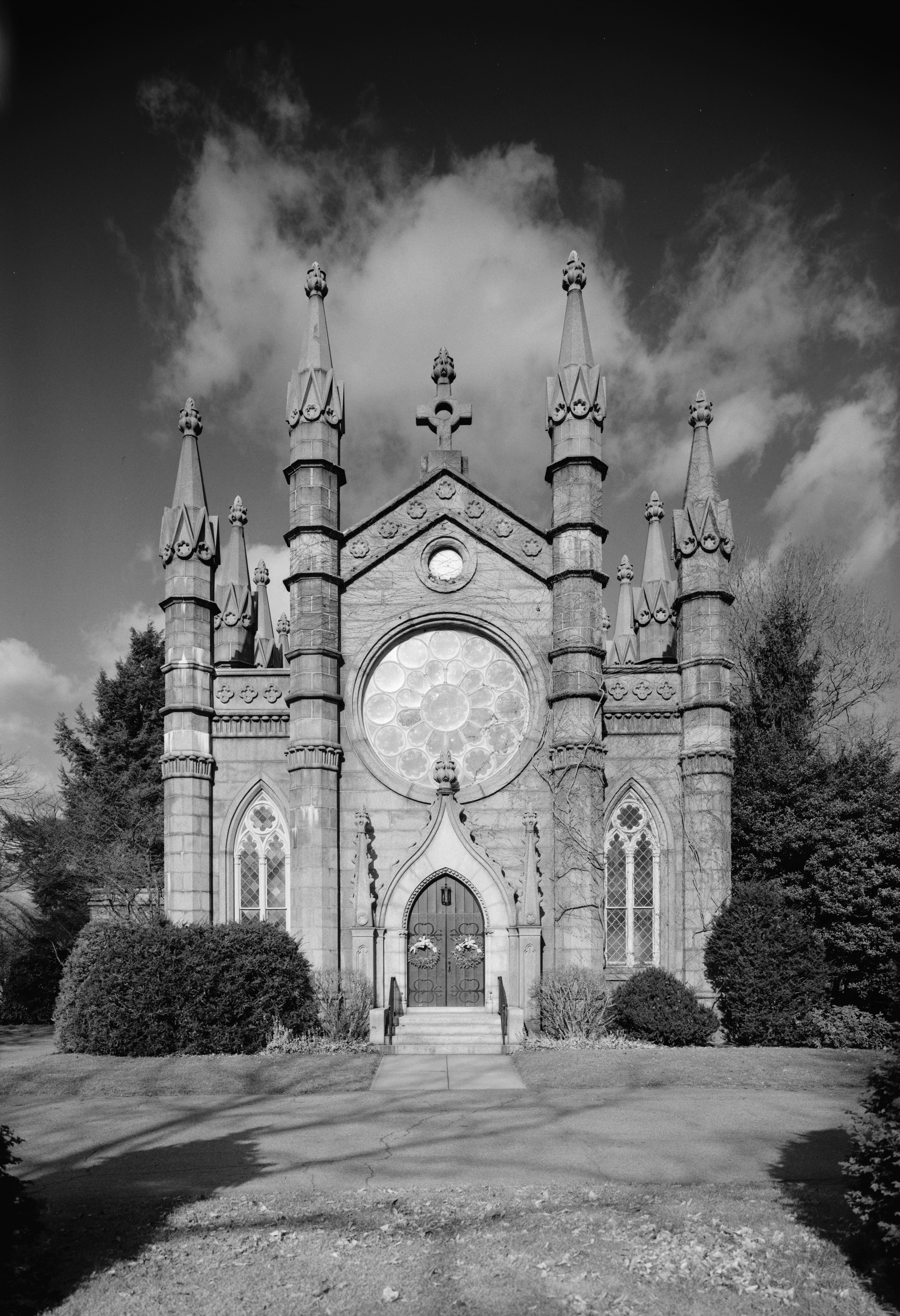
Bigelow Chapel, Mount Auburn Cemetery, Cambridge and Watertown, Mass.

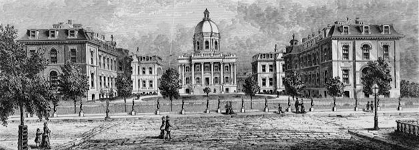
Boston City Hospital

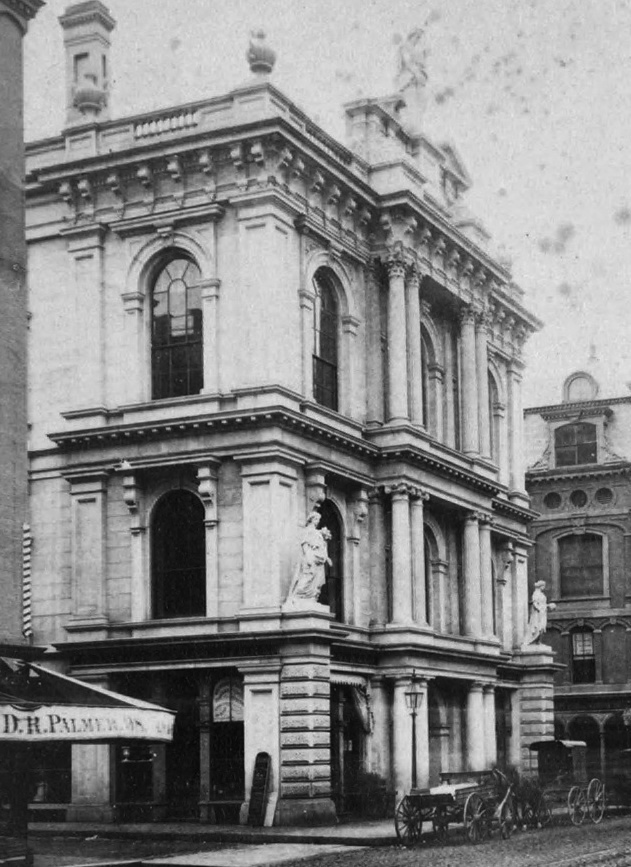
2nd Horticultural Hall, Tremont St., Boston (defunct)

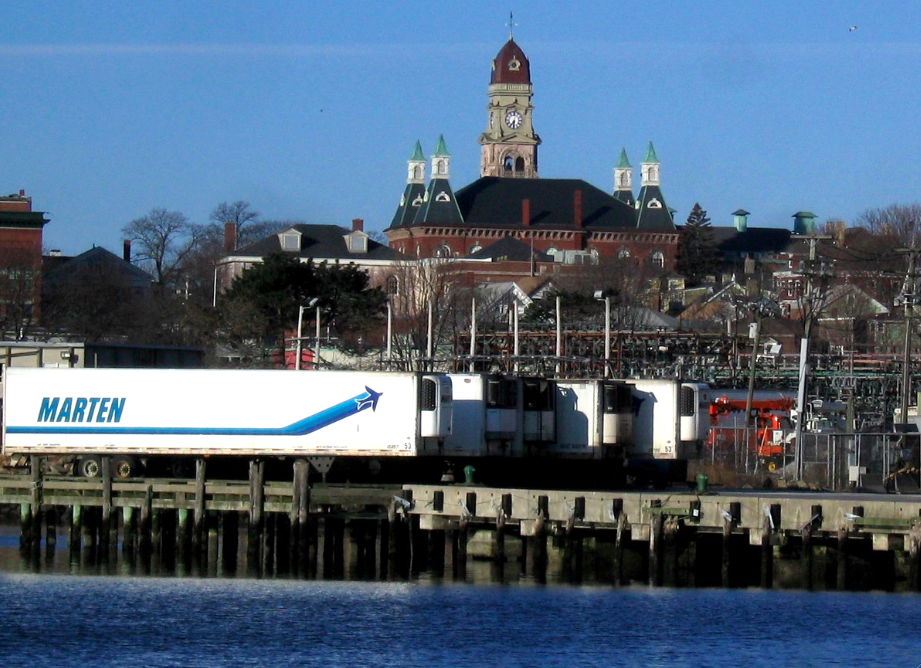
Gloucester (Mass.) City Hall

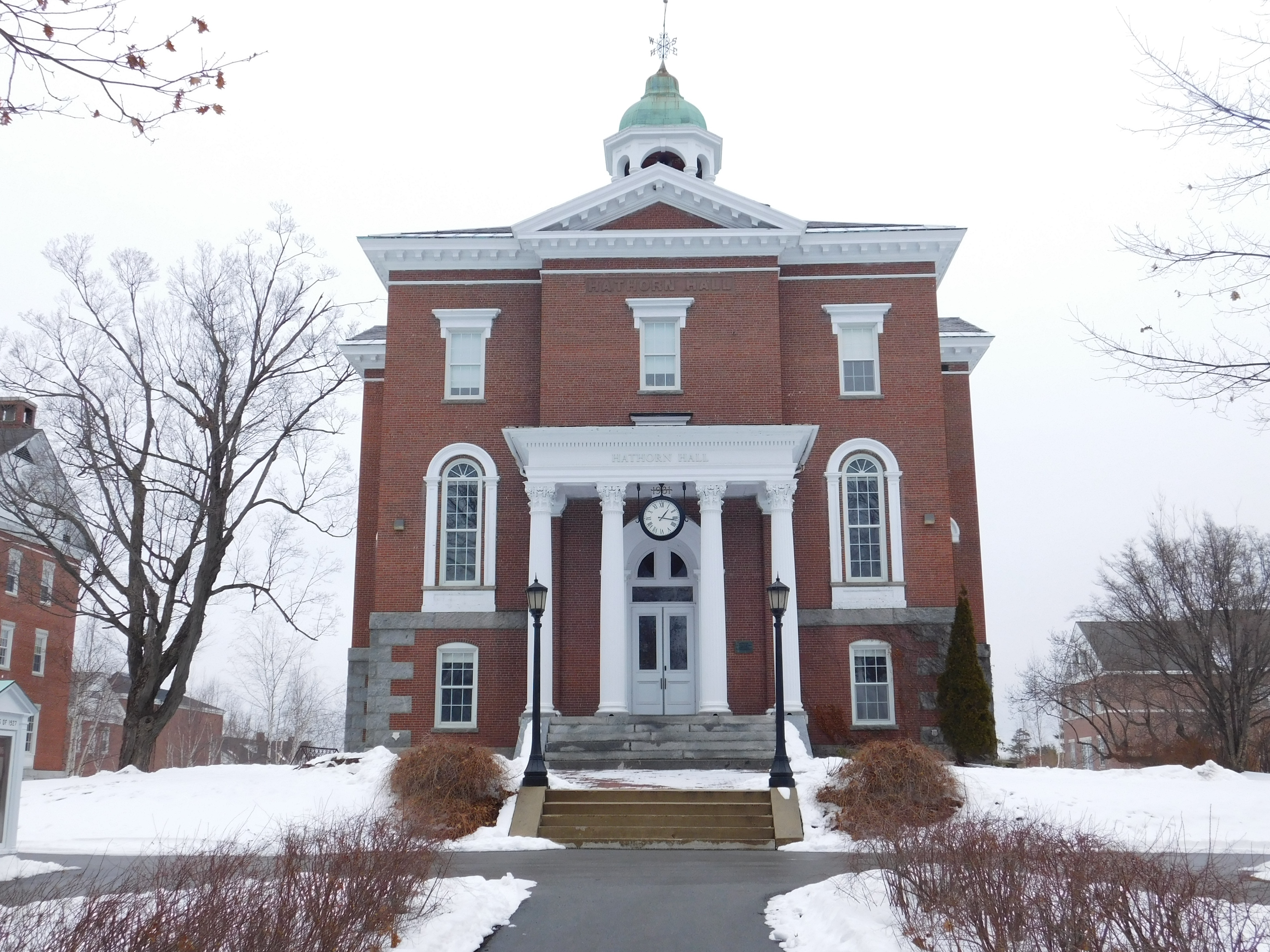
Hathorn Hall, Bates College

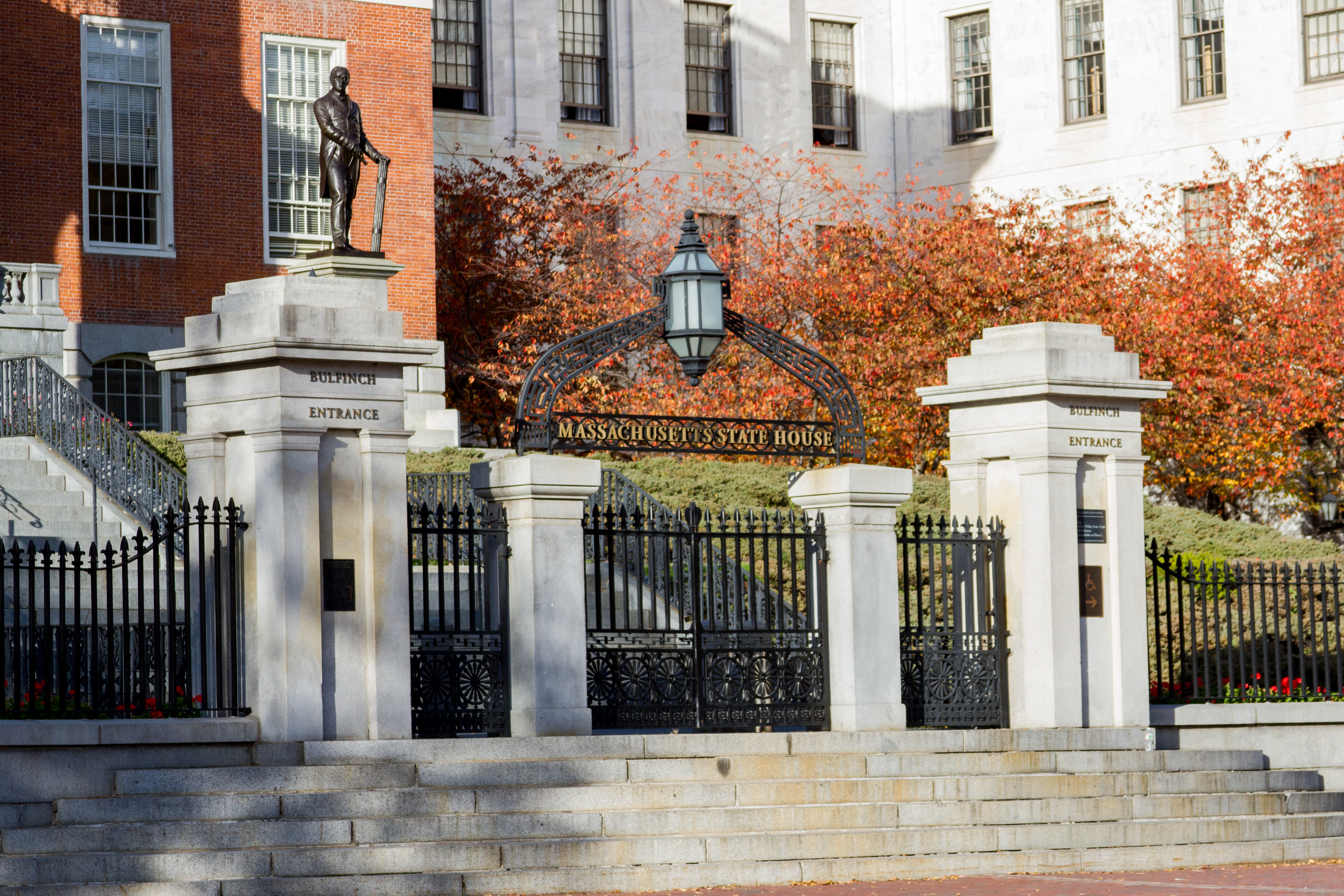
Mass. State House, Boston

== Buildings designed or influenced by Bryant ==
- Bryant principal architect or architect, except where noted.
- Italics = Building defunct.
- NRHP = U.S. National Register of Historic Places.

For a full listing of Bryant's projects see Reed, pp. 177–198.

Building	Built	Client	Notes
Old South Block, Milk Street, Boston	1846	Commercial	(Photo, Reed., p. 47.)
Salem station, Salem, Mass.	1846	Eastern Railroad	(Ref. Photo, Reed, p. 49.)
Quincy School, Tyler Street	1847 or 1848	City of Boston	Old design since replaced. NRHP 100001458. (Photo, Reed, p. 54.)
The Almshouse	1850	City of Cambridge, Mass.	Public residence.
Charles Street Jail (Suffolk County Jail), Boston	1851	Suffolk County, Mass.	With Louis Dwight. NRHP ID 80000670.
John Tucker Daland House, Salem, Mass.	1851	John Tucker Daland	Essex Institute Historic District Certification.
Ballou Hall	1852	Tufts University, Medford, Mass.	
Mass. State House, Boston, 2nd addition	1853	Commonwealth (state) of Massachusetts	Finished poss. bit later than 1853. NRHP. (Drawing, Reed, p. 78.)
Bates College buildings	1856–1857	Bates College, Lewiston, Maine	Hathorn Hall (NRHP ID 70000071); Parker Hall.
Mercantile Wharf	1857	Commercial	(Photo, Reed, p. 83.)
Androscoggin County Courthouse and Jail, Auburn, Maine	1857	Androscoggin County, Maine	With Albert Currier. NRHP.
State Street Block, State Street, Boston	1858	Commercial	Only partially still extant. U.S. Historic District Contributing property. (Ref.)
Aroostook County Courthouse and Jail, Houlton, Maine	1859	Aroostook County, Maine	With Wilfred E. Mansur. NRHP ID 89002340.
Arlington Street Church, Boston	1860		With Arthur Gilman. NRHP.
Boston City Hospital	1861	City of Boston	NRHP.
Old City Hall	1865	City of Boston	With Arthur Gilman. NRHP ID 70000687.
Second Horticultural Hall, Boston	1865	Mass. Horticultural Society	NRHP.
Gloucester City Hall	1869	Town (now city) of Gloucester, Mass.	With Louis P. Rogers. NRHP.
Charlestown (Mass.) State Prison	1869	Mass. Dept. of Correction	Charlestown now part of Boston.
Robert Treat Paine Estate, Waltham, Mass.	1869	Robert Treat Paine	NRHP.
Railroad Station, Waterville, Maine	1872	Maine Central Railroad	College Ave & Chaplin St. Addition added 1906. Demolished 1963 for rail re-alignment
Wilder Memorial Hall	1879	Civic building, Town of Hingham, Mass.	Presume defunct. (Reed, pp. 165–167.)
Cony High School	1880	City of Augusta, Maine	Probably with Clarence Luce. Presume defunct. (Reed, pp. 162, 163.)
Parker House hotel, Boston, extension	1886		(Reed, p. 167.)

== Drawings ==
- In progress:

Building	Drawn	Client	Notes
Residence, New London, Conn.	1866	Benjamin J. Stark	Firm of Bryant & Gilman. Bryant role unknown. Unclear whether house built. (Columbia Univ.)

== Bibliography ==
- Bailey, Henry Turner. “An Architect of the Old School.” New England Magazine: An Illustrated Monthly. New series, vol. 25, Nov. 1901. pp. 326–349. Full view: Internet Archive. About Bryant.
- Reed, Roger G. Building Victorian Boston: The Architecture of Gridley J. F. Bryant. Univ. of Massachusetts Press, 2007.
