= Old City Hall (Boston) =

Building in Boston, Massachusetts

- U.S. National Register of Historic Places
- U.S. National Historic Landmark
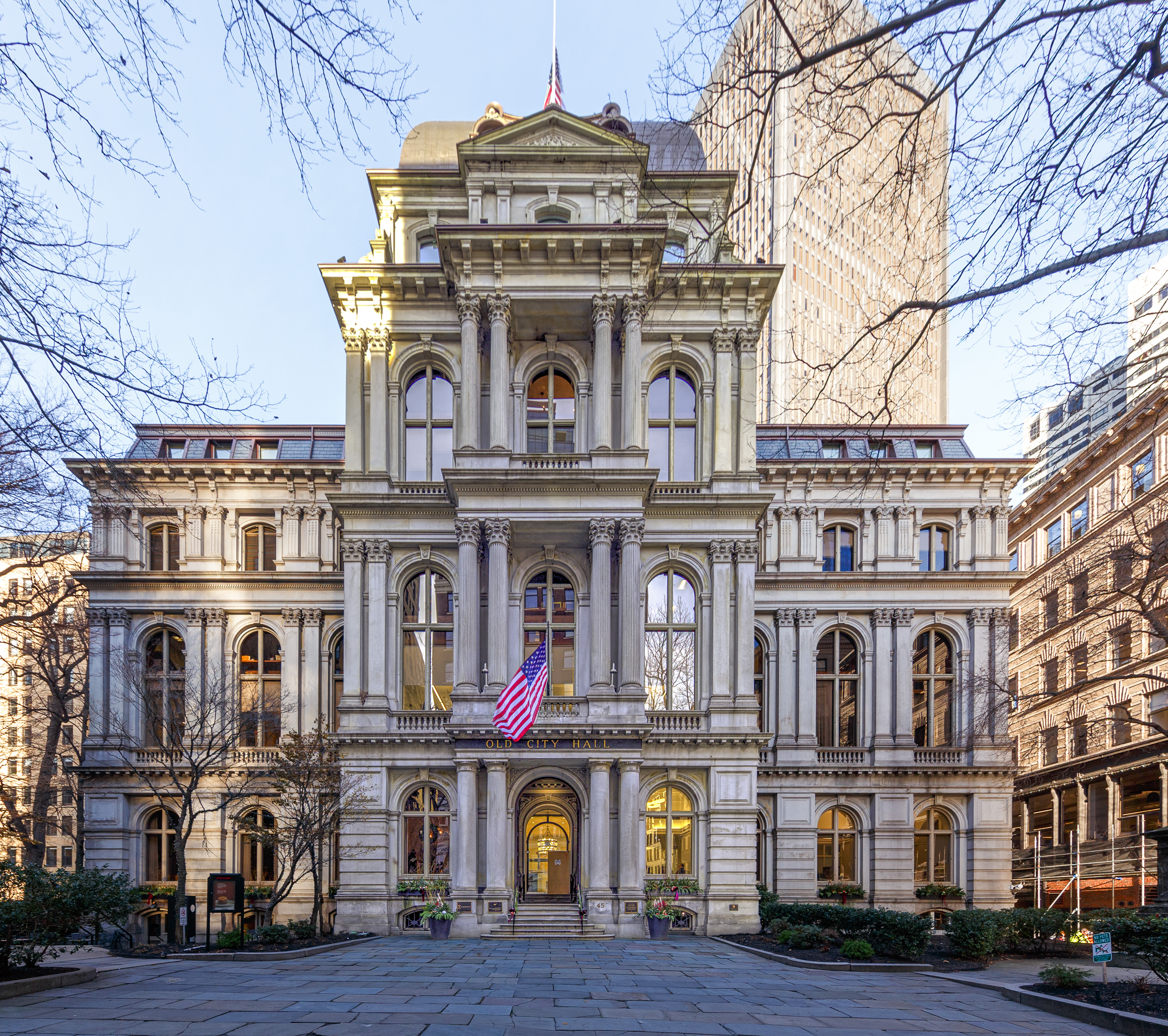
- Old City Hall in 2024

- Location within Boston Location within Massachusetts Location within the United States
- Interactive map of Old City Hall
- Location: 45 School Street; Boston, Massachusetts, U.S.
- Coordinates: 42°21′29.20″N 71°3′33.59″W
- Built: 1862–1865
- Architect: G. J. F. Bryant, A. D. Gilman
- Architectural style: Second Empire
- NRHP reference No.: 70000687

Significant dates
- Added to NRHP: December 30, 1970
- Designated NHL: December 30, 1970

Old City Hall is a building at 45 School Street in Boston, Massachusetts, U.S., which housed the Boston City Council from 1865 to 1969. Designed by Gridley J. F. Bryant and Arthur Gilman, it was one of the first buildings in the French Second Empire style to be built in the United States. After the building's completion, the Second Empire style was used extensively elsewhere in Boston and for many public buildings in the United States, including the Eisenhower Executive Office Building in Washington, D.C., Providence City Hall in Providence, Baltimore City Hall in Baltimore, and Philadelphia City Hall in Philadelphia.

== History ==
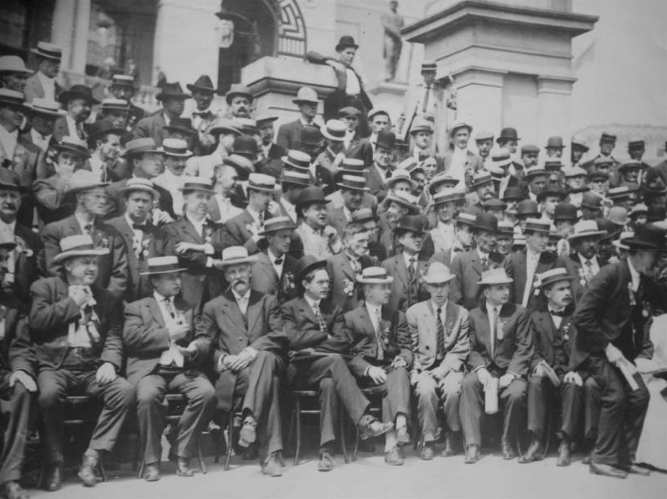
Boston City Hall habituées, c. 1910

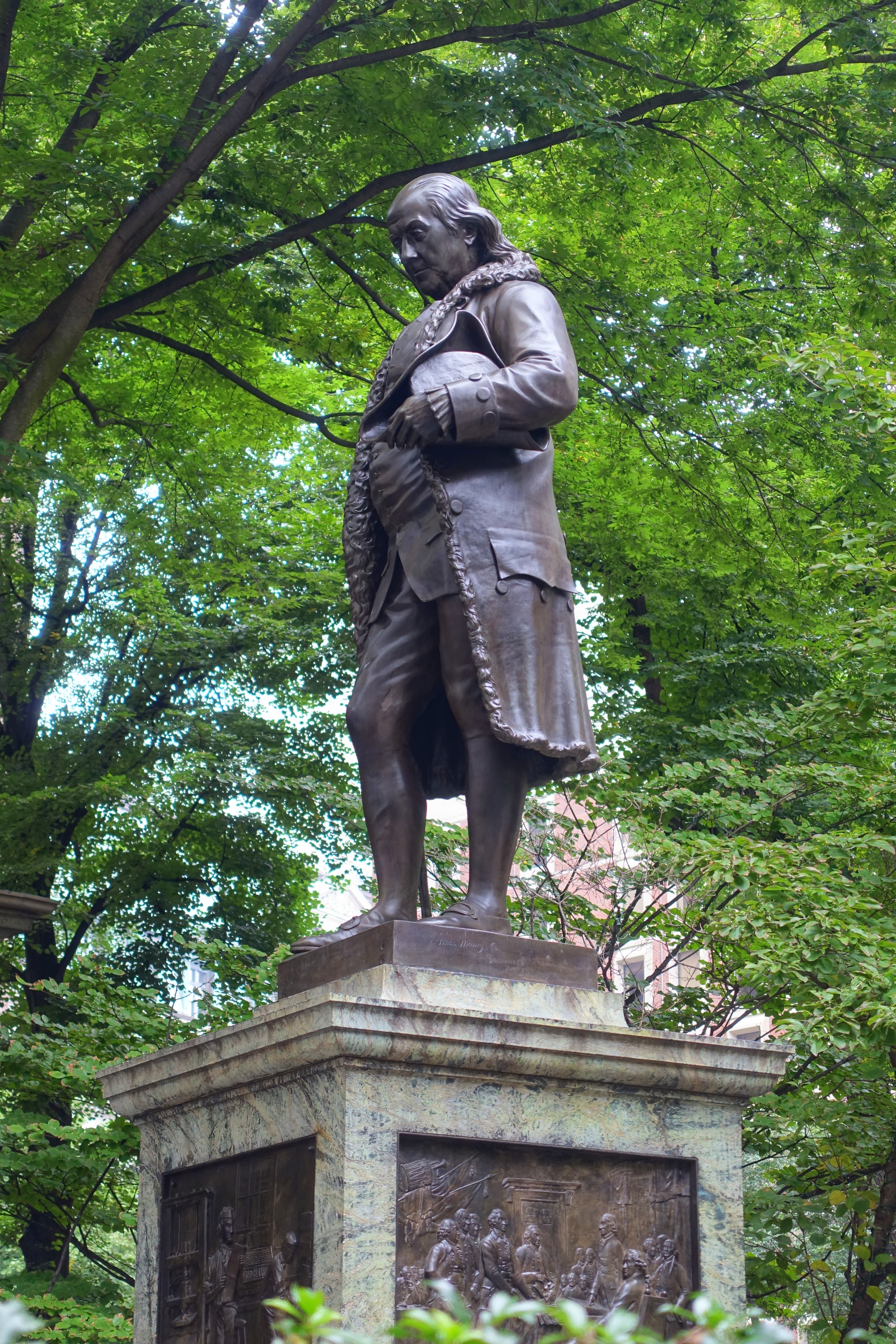
Statue of Benjamin Franklin

Old City Hall, built between 1862 and 1865, is located at 45 School Street, along the Freedom Trail between the Old South Meeting House and King's Chapel. The Boston Latin School operated on the site from 1704 to 1748, and on the same street until 1844.

Also on the site, the Suffolk County Courthouse was erected in 1810 and converted to Boston's second city hall in 1841, being replaced by the current building twenty-four years later. Thirty-eight Boston mayors, including John F. Fitzgerald, Maurice J. Tobin, and James Michael Curley, served their terms of office on School Street at this site over a period of 128 years.

With the move to the current Boston City Hall in 1969, Old City Hall was converted over the next two years to serve other functions – an early and successful example of adaptive reuse. The Boston-based nonprofit developer Architectural Heritage Foundation, Inc. (now AHF Boston) and the architecture firm Anderson Notter Associates completed the adaptive use and renovation. AHF Boston subsequently managed the property for fifty years.

It was listed on the National Register of Historic Places and was designated a U.S. National Historic Landmark in 1970.

=== Points of architectural interest ===
- The granite exterior characterized by ornamented columns, the mansard roof, and the projecting central bay
- The massive front doors, unusual in the use of different wood, as well as the inlay of the marble circle in each door
- The murals in the building entrances on School Street and Court Square illustrating the history of both the building and the site
- The marble plaque in the first floor lobby commemorating the laying of the cornerstone in 1862 by Mayor Joseph Wightman and the dedication of the building in 1865 by Mayor Frederic W. Lincoln Jr.
- The hopscotch in the School Street sidewalk recognizing this as the site of the Boston Latin School
- The statues in the courtyard:
  - Benjamin Franklin, who attended school on this site. Scenes of Franklin's accomplishments appear in bas-relief on the square pedestal of the statue. The statue (1856) was the first portrait statue to be erected in Boston. Franklin is depicted as he would actually appear, rather than draped in toga, cloak, or classical attire. The statue was designed by Richard Saltonstall Greenough, as are two of the bas-reliefs.
  - Josiah Quincy III, Boston's second mayor; the statue (1879) was designed by Thomas Ball.
  - A donkey, signifying the Democratic Party, with two bronze footprints in front of it labeled "stand in opposition" and a plaque explaining the origin of the donkey as the party's symbol.

== Old City Hall today ==
In 2017, Synergy Investments purchased Old City Hall for $30.1 million from AHF Boston. With more than 83,000 square feet (7,700 m^{2}) of real estate, it now houses a number of businesses, organizations, and a Ruth's Chris Steak House, Welch & Forbes, Underscore VC, McLane Middleton, Kaymbu and many more, though its most famous tenant, the upscale French restaurant Maison Robert, closed in 2004.

== Mayors who served in Old City Hall ==
- Frederic W. Lincoln Jr. (1863–1866)
- Otis Norcross (1867–1868)
- Nathaniel B. Shurtleff (1868–1871)
- William Gaston (1871–1872)
- Henry L. Pierce (1873)
- Leonard R. Cutter (1873)
- Samuel C. Cobb (1874–1876)
- Frederick O. Prince (1877)
- Henry L. Pierce (1878)
- Frederick O. Prince (1879–1881)
- Samuel A. Green (1882)
- Albert Palmer (1883)
- Augustus P. Martin (1884)
- Hugh O'Brien (1885–1888)
- Thomas N. Hart (1889–1890)
- Nathan Matthews Jr. (1891–1894)
- Edwin Upton Curtis (1895)
- Josiah Quincy (1896–1899)
- Thomas N. Hart (1900–1902)
- Patrick Collins (1902–1905)
- Daniel A. Whelton (1905–1906)
- John F. Fitzgerald (1906–1908, 1910–1914)
- George A. Hibbard (1908–1910)
- James M. Curley (1914–1918, 1922–1926, 1930–1934, 1946–1950)
- Andrew J. Peters (1918–1922)
- Malcolm Nichols (1926–1930)
- Frederick Mansfield (1934–1938)
- Maurice J. Tobin (1938–1945)
- John E. Kerrigan (1945–1946)
- John B. Hynes (1947, 1950–1960)
- John F. Collins (1960–1968)
- Kevin H. White (1968–1984)

== Gallery ==
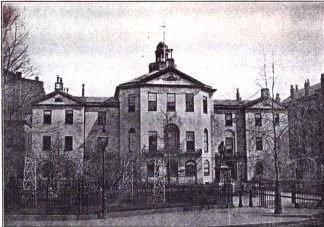
Old Suffolk County Courthouse and Boston's City Hall 1841 to 1865

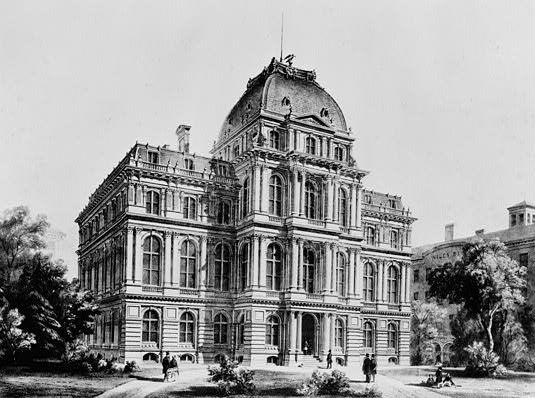
Old City Hall, c. 1865

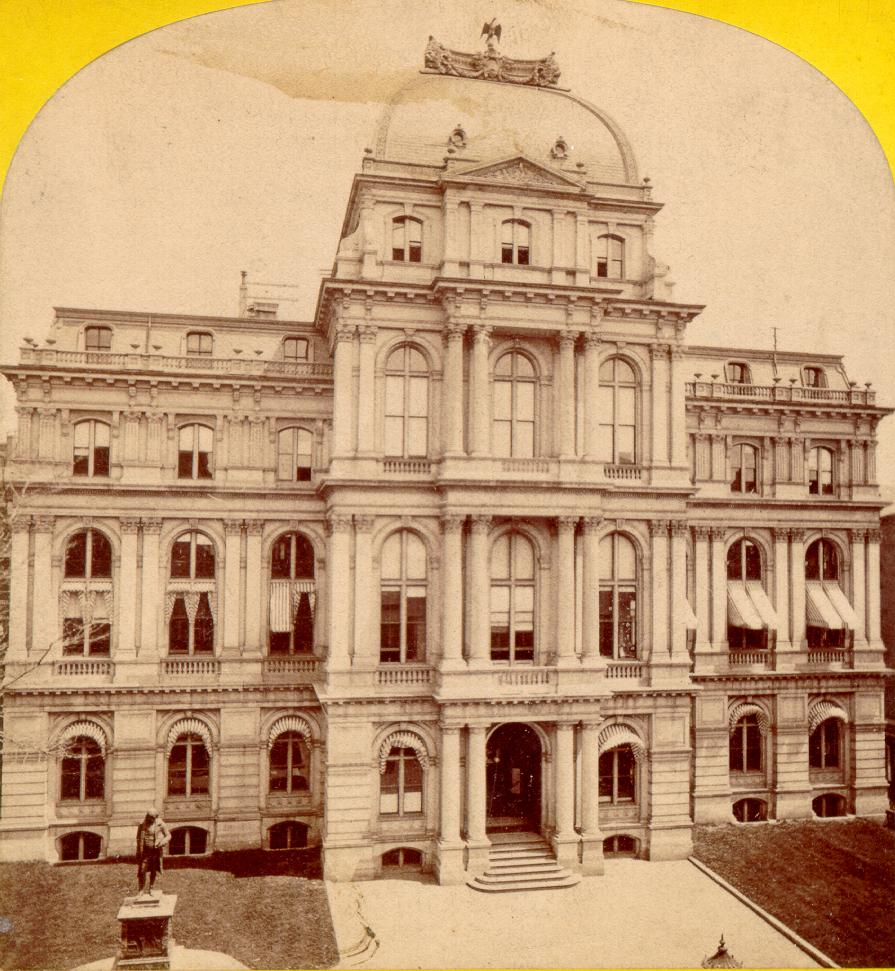
Old City Hall, c. 1868 in a stereograph view

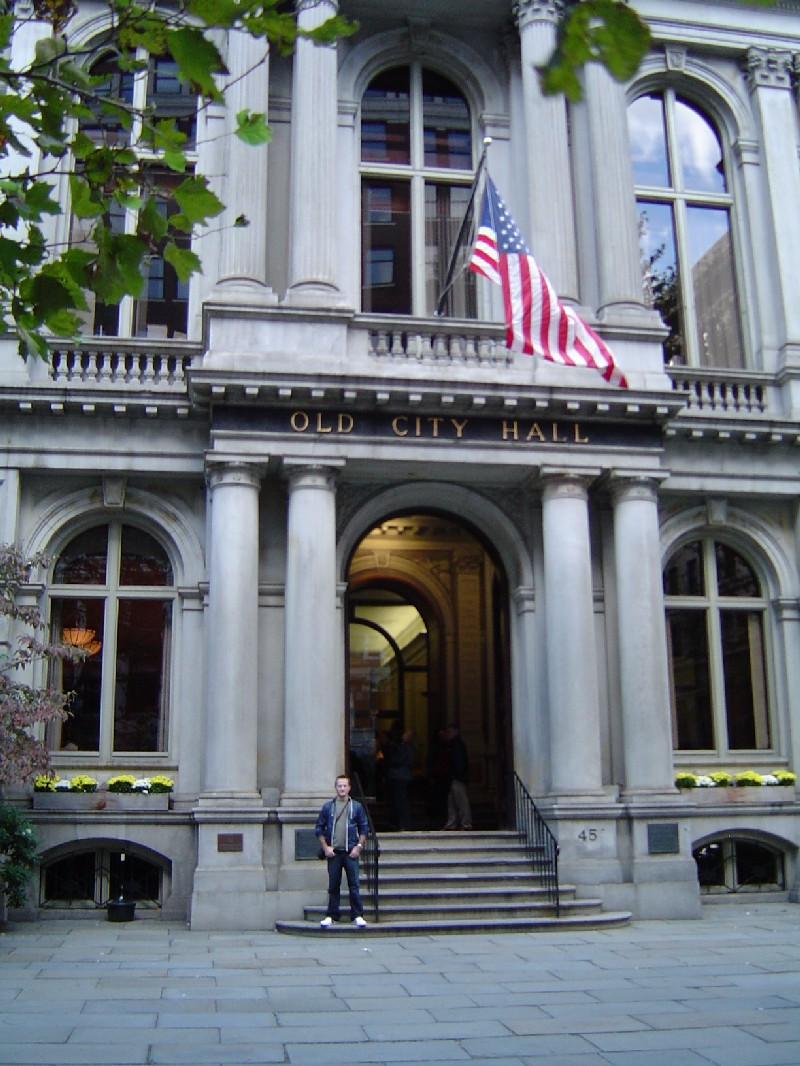
Courtyard and entrance, 10/2006
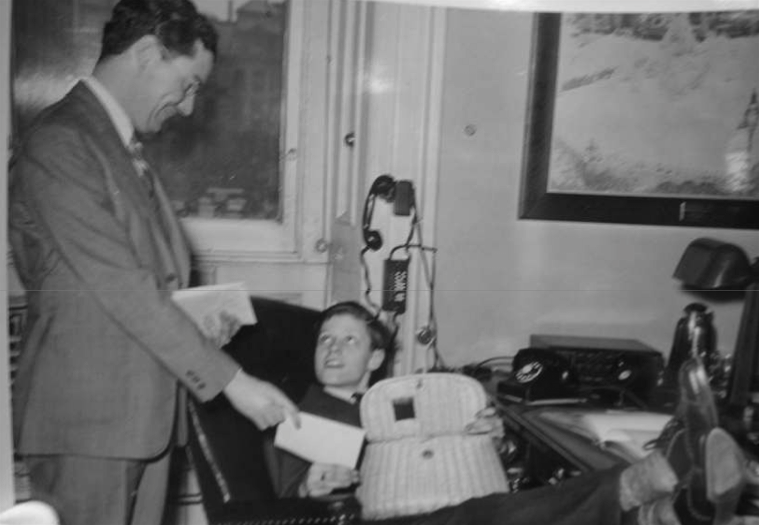
Boston City Council office, City Hall, 1940

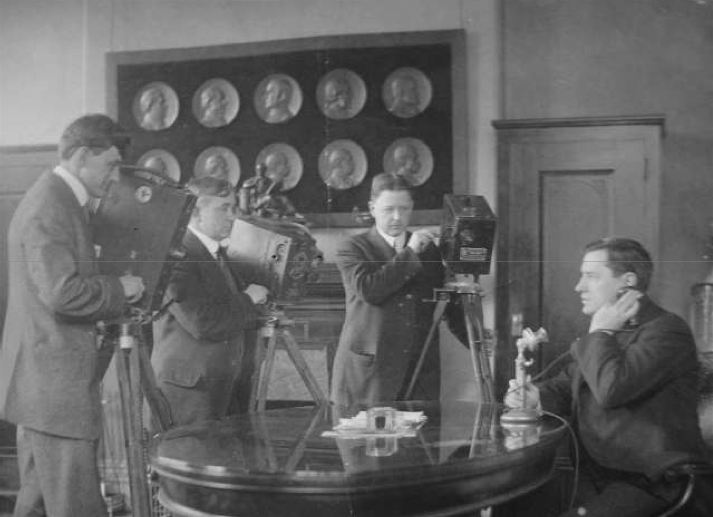
James Curley at Boston City Hall, 1913

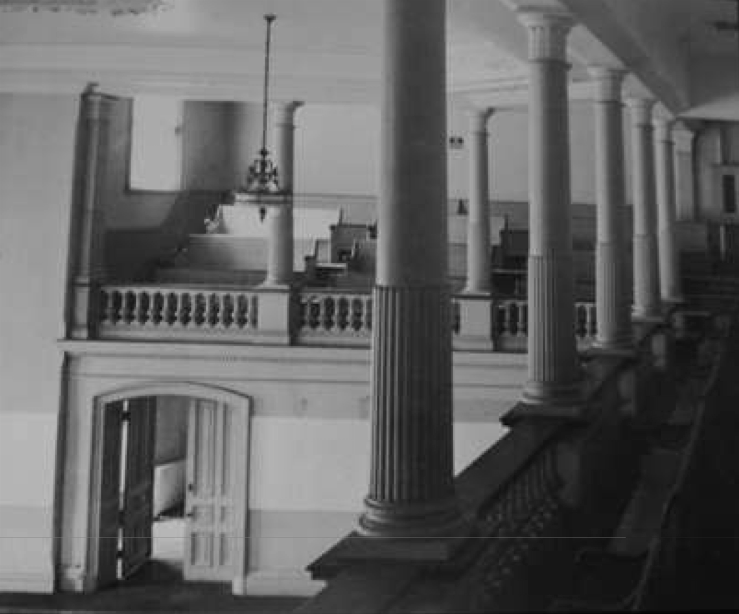
Boston City Council chambers, City Hall, c. 20th century

== See also ==
- Boston City Council
- List of mayors of Boston
- List of National Historic Landmarks in Boston
- Past Members of the Boston City Council
- National Register of Historic Places listings in northern Boston, Massachusetts

Other city hall buildings:

- First Town-House (Boston) – the first town hall of Boston
- Old State House (Boston) – the second town hall of Boston; also a city hall during the 1830s
- Faneuil Hall – the third town hall of Boston
- Boston City Hall – the current city hall
