= A Once and Future Shoreline =

Public artwork in Boston, Massachusetts, US

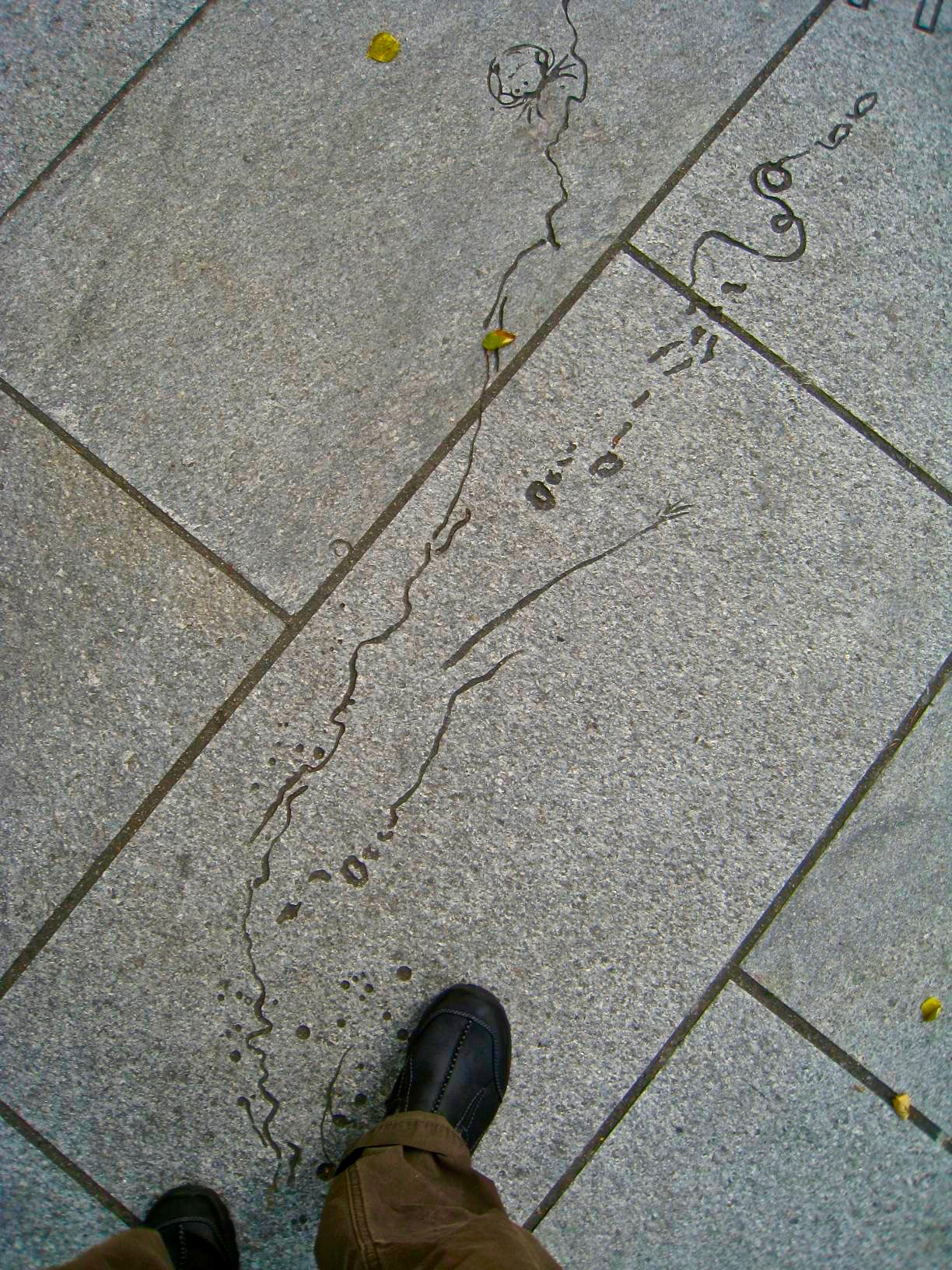
- Artist: Ross Miller
- Year: 1996
- Type: Sculpture
- Medium: etched Quincy and Chelmsford granite
- Dimensions: 1.2 acres (4,900 m^{2})
- Location: Faneuil Hall Boston, Massachusetts
- Coordinates: 42°21′36.0″N 71°03′22.5″W
- Owner: Public Art Collection / City of Boston

A Once and Future Shoreline is a permanent public artwork that graphically marks the edge of Boston Harbor, c. 1630, into the granite paving blocks of the plaza on the west side of the historic Faneuil Hall building. The 850-foot-long artwork depicts the location of a pre-colonial shoreline by graphically etching silhouettes of materials that are found typically along the high tide line. The artwork offers a way to engage the imagination in an exploration of the changes to this now urban site from a salty tidal marsh, to an active pedestrian plaza.

== Background ==
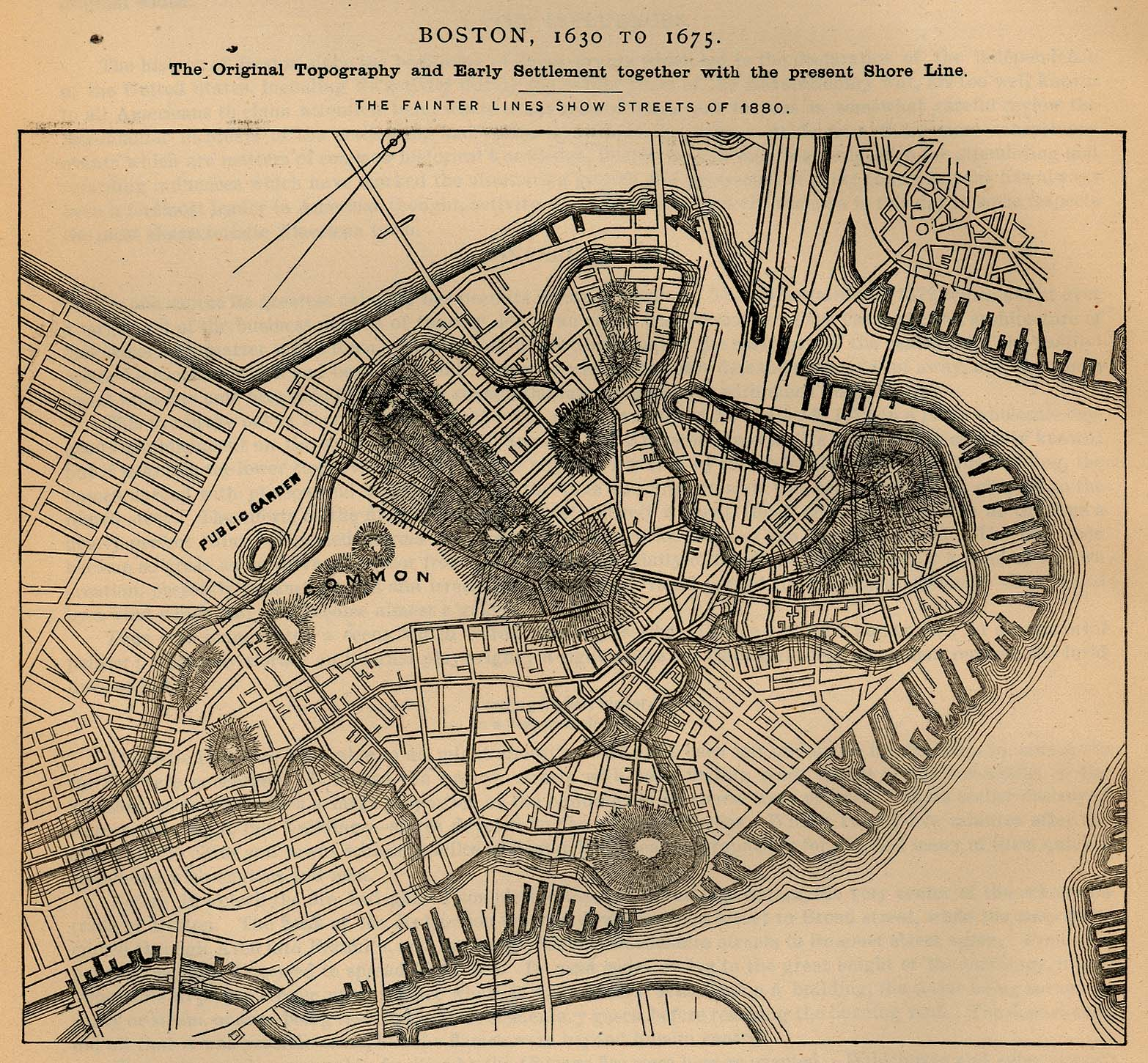
The shoreline and topography of Boston, Massachusetts, as it was from 1630–1675, overlaid on an 1880 street map

The public plaza the artwork is located on was historically one of the first Boston Harbor landing places, named Town Dock. When the dock, and adjacent sections of the harbor were filled to create new land during the late 17th century, the area became known as Dock Square. The shoreline marking project and artwork details were developed in consultation with the Boston Art Commission, the office of the Boston City Archeologist, and the Boston Landmarks Commission. Plans and construction documents for the artwork are based on research of historic maps from the Norman B. Leventhal Map Center collection, and writings of historian Nancy Seasholes. The entire shoreline surrounding the original land mass of Boston has been repeatedly filled in and modified, starting in the early 17th century, through a process known as wharfing out. The A Once and Future Shoreline artwork presents one section of that pre-colonial shoreline to the public in an actively used downtown location.

== Design details ==
The estimated position of the pre-colonial shoreline edge at high tide is cut into granite using hand-made stencils of high-tide line debris, including: sea grass; Bladder Wrack seaweed; skate egg casings; quahog shells; Blue Mussels; feathers; sea cucumber; Sea Robin; rock crabs; pieces of old rope. In addition to the shoreline etching, the plaza paving pattern presents an overlay from an 1820 map of the area, depicting an historical street layout in gray granite block, and the building plot locations from the same time period marked with etched dash lines and a shift to pink granite paving blocks. The A Once and Future Shoreline artwork is adjacent to the relocated 19th century sculpture of Samuel Adams by Anne Whitney.

== Geological context ==
The public plaza land area where the sculpture is located, in what is now known as downtown Boston, is inland from the location of the ocean's edge 5000 years ago. At that time early native people occupied low grassy plains and forest covered hills that today are under the water of Boston Harbor. The placement of this now land-locked shoreline marking may indicate the shoreline again in the future due to the impact of rising ocean levels as a consequence of global climate change
