= Statue of Samuel Adams =

Sculpture in multiple versions by Anne Whitney

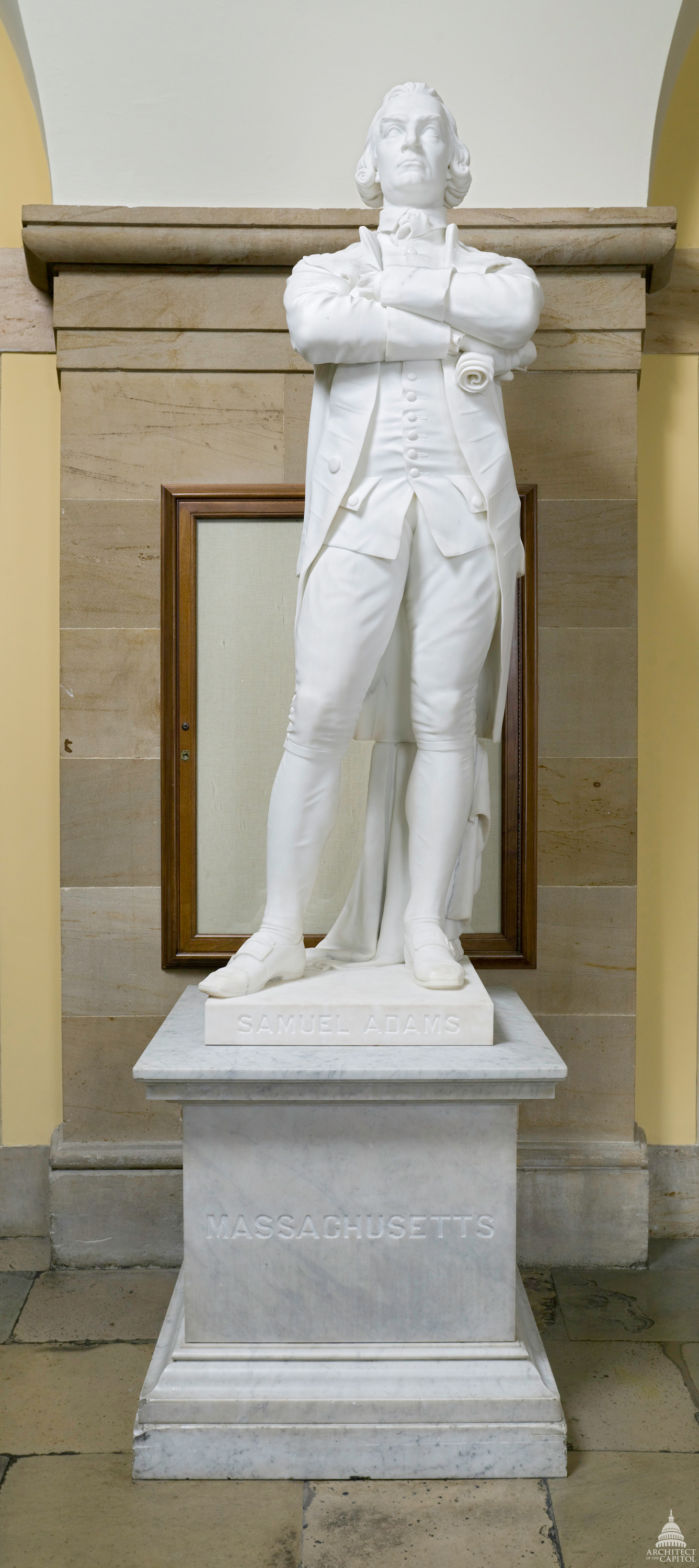
- Samuel Adams, 1876, National Statuary Hall Collection

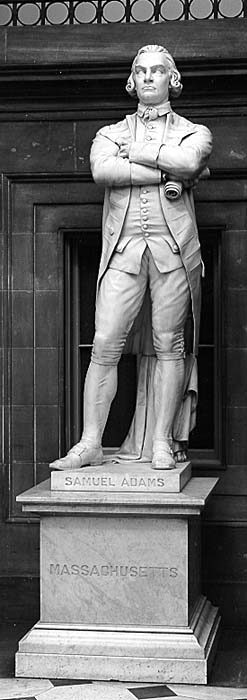
A closer view of the artwork

Anne Whitney created two public statues of American Founding Father Samuel Adams. One, made in 1876, is in the National Statuary Hall Collection in the United States Capitol, Washington, D.C. The other, made in 1880, is located in front of Faneuil Hall Plaza in Boston.

== National Statuary Hall Collection ==
Congress asked each state to provide the nation's capitol with two statues of prominent individuals. Some thought that John Adams, Samuel's cousin and also a Founding Father as well as an American president, should have been chosen, but at the time Samuel Adams was the most popular figure in the state's history. Having written thousands of letters to political leaders and newspapers, he was called "the most persuasive political writers of all time" by George Sand.

Whitney won a contest in 1873 to create a statue of Samuel Adams, one of the requirements being that the statue be carved in Italy from a plaster cast made in Boston. She traveled to Italy in 1875 to acquire Carrara marble for the sculpture. It was sent to Washington, D.C. in 1876, the country's centennial. In a verse that mocked the judges who first selected her in a blind competition to create a statue for Charles Sumner, but deselected her when they found out that she was a woman, a verse was published in New York Evening Telegram that stated, "Yet under the dome of the Capitol / Stands Samuel Adams erect and tall, / As free as his namesake before the fall; / And though the image was carved by woman / Rarely is marble so grandly human." The statue was unveiled in the Capitol on December 19, 1876.

== Faneuil Hall ==
Samuel Adams, bronze and granite, 1880,
Faneuil Hall Plaza, Boston
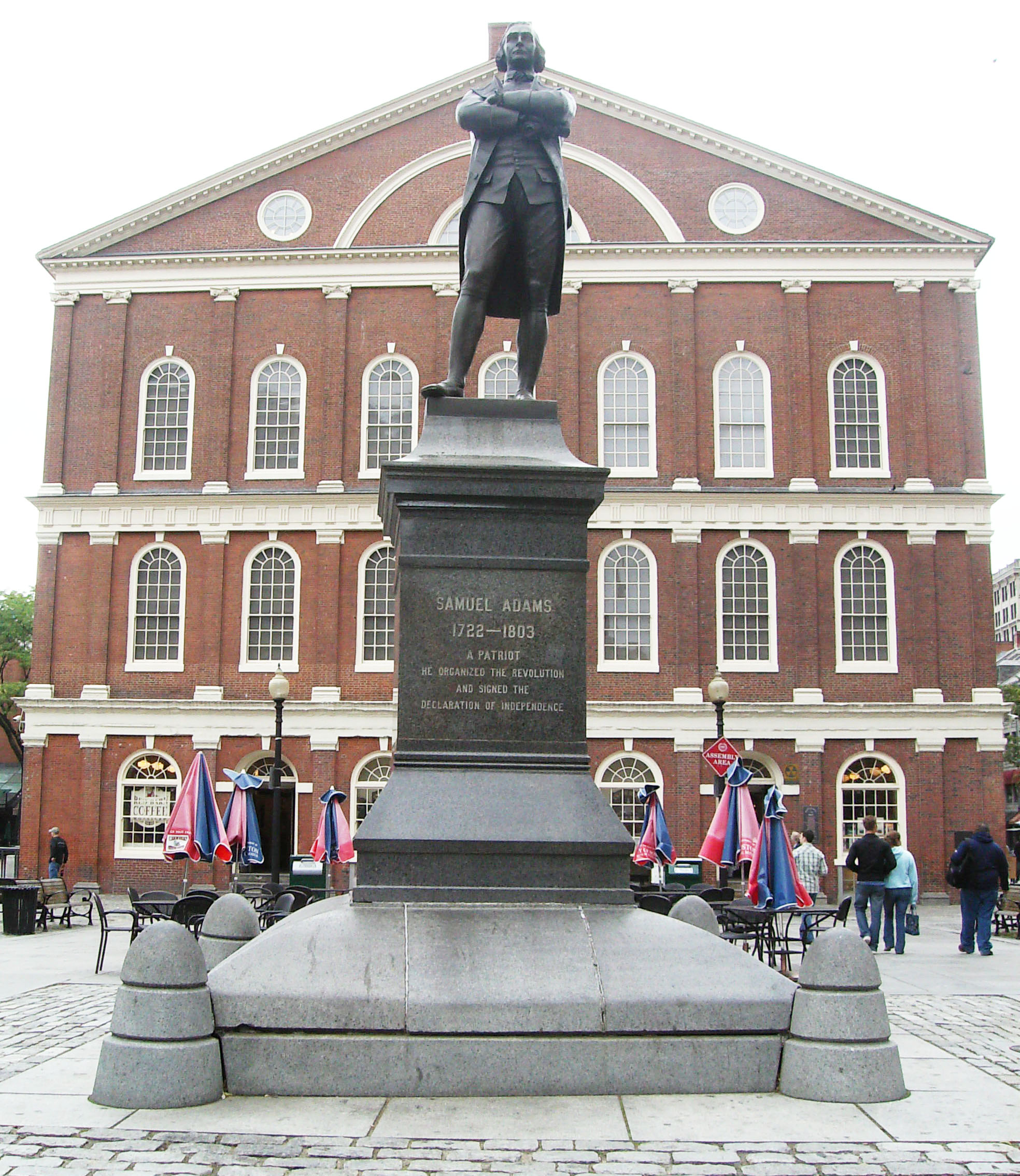
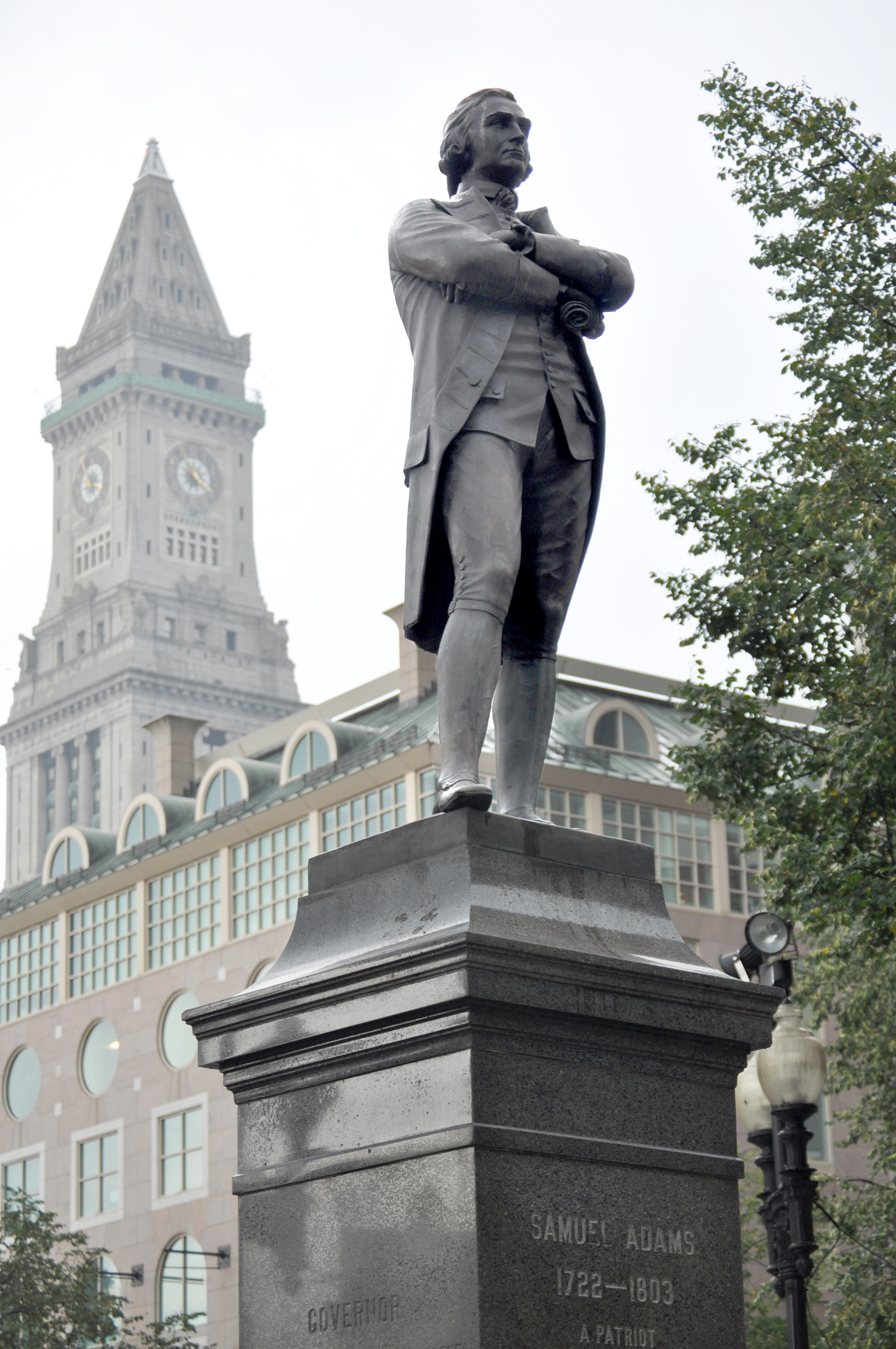

Before being sent to Washington, D.C., the statue was exhibited at the Boston Athenæum where it proved to be so popular that the citizens of Boston commissioned a bronze version for the city. The bronze version of the statue on a granite base (1880) was installed on Congress Street in Faneuil Hall Plaza in Boston, where Adams gave speeches about British rule and taxation. It is based upon the marble statue that she made for the National Statuary Hall Collection. She was requested to make another version by the City of Boston.

Adams attitude suggests one of defiance against British rule, such as the manner in which his arms are crossed, and determination. Adam's face is finely chiseled, and he wears citizen's clothing of the period. The Revolutionary patriot, Adams founded the Sons of Liberty with John Hancock to protest unfair taxation on the residents of the colonies. The statue is meant to convey his attitude at the point, after the Boston Massacre, when Adams demanded that Governor Thomas Hutchinson remove British troops from the city. The troops were moved to Castle Island in Boston Harbor. The inscription on the monument states "Samuel Adams 1722–1803 – A Patriot – He organized the Revolution, and signed the Declaration of Independence. Governor – A True Leader of the People. Erected A. D. 1880, from a fund bequeathed to the city of Boston by Jonathan Phillips. A statesman, incorruptible and fearless."

The pedestal is ten feet high. That statue sits upon a polished Quincy granite base and cap and a lower nine-feet square base of unpolished Quincy granite. The granite plaza surface is marked for 850 feet (260 m) with the approximate location of the early Colonial shoreline c. 1630. The street layout and building plot plan designations from an 1820 map are shown by etched dashed lines and changes from pink granite to grey granite paving slabs. The 1996 shoreline marking artwork by Ross Miller entitled, A Once and Future Shoreline, is made with etched silhouettes of seaweed, sea grass, fish, shells and other materials found along a high tide line.

It first stood in Adams Square, but was moved for the construction of the Government Center.
