= Faneuil Hall =

Building in Boston, Massachusetts

- U.S. National Register of Historic Places
- U.S. National Historic Landmark
- U.S. Historic district – Contributing property
- Boston Landmark
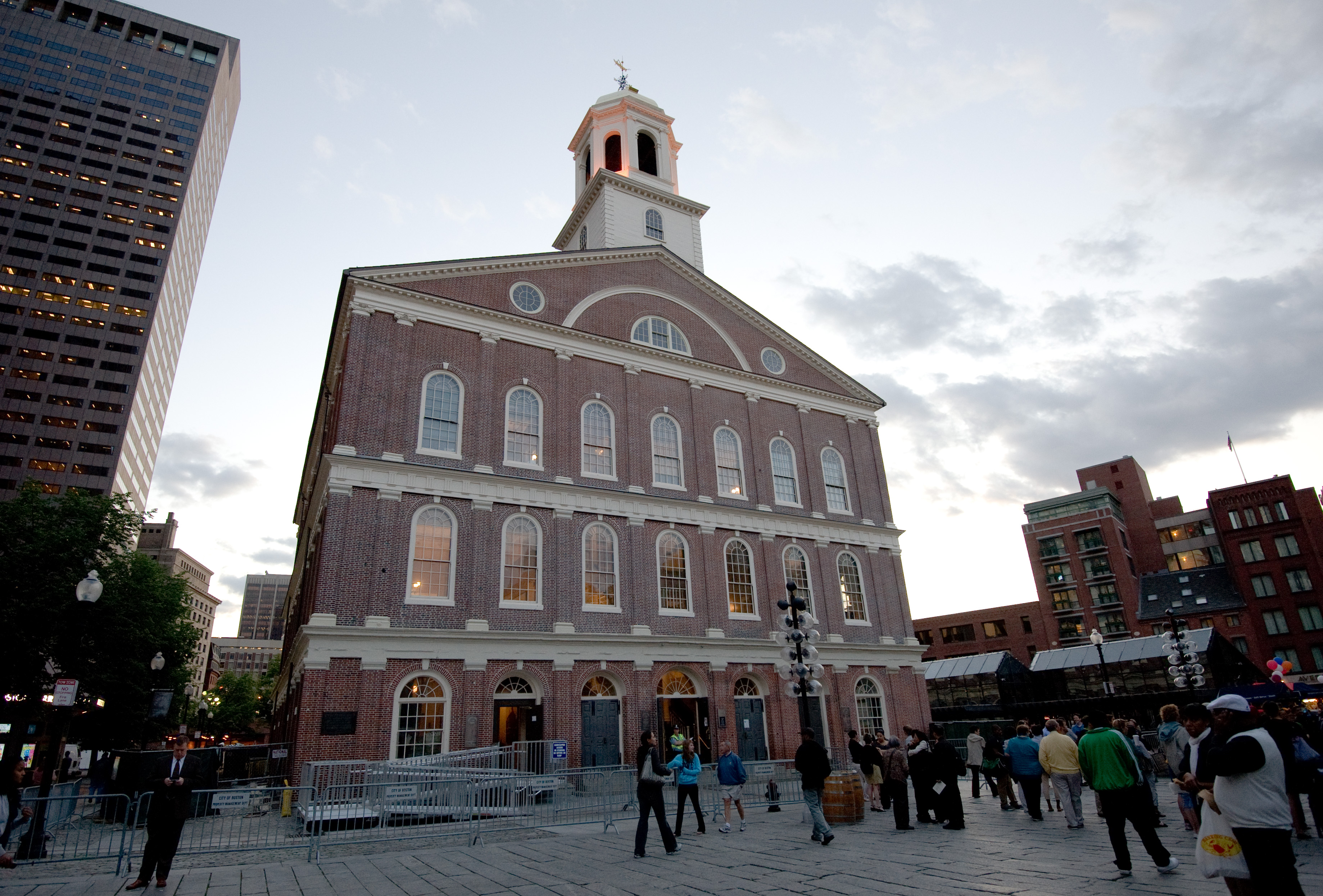
- The eastern elevation of Faneuil Hall in 2011

- Location within Boston Location within Massachusetts Location within the United States
- Interactive map of Faneuil Hall
- Location: Merchants Row; Boston, Massachusetts, U.S.
- Coordinates: 42°21′36″N 71°03′22″W
- Built: 1742
- Architect: John Smibert; Charles Bulfinch
- Architectural style: Georgian
- Part of: Boston National Historical Park (ID74002222)
- NRHP reference No.: 66000368

Significant dates
- Added to NRHP: October 15, 1966
- Designated NHL: October 9, 1960
- Designated CP: October 26, 1974
- Designated BOSL: December 13, 1994

Faneuil Hall (/ˈfænəl/, /ˈfʌnəl/, or /ˈfænjəl/) is a historic building in Downtown Boston, Massachusetts, United States. Opened in 1742, the building was designed by artist John Smibert as a marketplace and meeting hall. Faneuil Hall is sometimes referred to as "the Cradle of Liberty", having been the site of many speeches, debates, and other events over its history. Over the years, the building, and especially its Great Hall meeting room, has received commentary for its symbolism. Faneuil Hall is part of Boston National Historical Park and is designated as a National Historic Landmark. It is owned by the Boston government and operated as part of the Faneuil Hall Marketplace.

Faneuil Hall hosted regular events and speeches before the American Revolutionary War, along with a marketplace at ground level. The original building burned down in 1761 and was rebuilt over the next decade. Faneuil Hall was remodeled and expanded by Charles Bulfinch in 1806, and it was renovated again in 1827 after the nearby Quincy Market opened. The interiors were rebuilt of noncombustible materials in 1898–1899, and Cram and Ferguson oversaw another renovation between 1923 and 1925. Further modifications took place throughout the 20th century, including several cleaning, fireproofing, restoration, and accessibility projects. The building was renovated again in the 21st century.

Faneuil Hall has four stories including the attic, and is made of red brick, divided vertically into several bays. There are entrances and arched sash windows on the first floor, and additional windows on the other stories, each separated by pilasters of varying designs. The slate gable roof has a cupola and a grasshopper-shaped weathervane. Inside, the basement is used for offices and education, while the first floor contains a market area measuring 76 by 100 feet (23 by 30 m). A stair from the main eastern entrance ascends through the building. On the second and third floors is the Great Hall, measuring 28 feet (8.5 m) high and 76 by 76 feet (23 by 23 m) across with various pieces of artwork. There are also small offices on the second floor. The fourth-story attic houses the Ancient and Honorable Artillery Company of Massachusetts, and there is a commandery room just beneath the cupola.

== Site ==
Faneuil Hall is located at Merchants Row in Downtown Boston, Massachusetts, United States, on the east side of Congress Street between North Street to the north and State Street to the south. It occupies filled land that had been underwater until 1732. The building is surrounded by plazas, including Faneuil Hall Square to the north, south, and west; the western space was historically part of Dock Square. Across Congress Street is Boston City Hall within Government Center, while to the east is the Quincy Market complex. Faneuil Hall is a stop on the Freedom Trail, a path connecting historic sites in Boston; sequentially, it is between the Old State House and Paul Revere House. Until the early 18th century, the site of Faneuil Hall adjoined Town Cove, a cove in Boston Harbor.

=== Exterior artwork ===
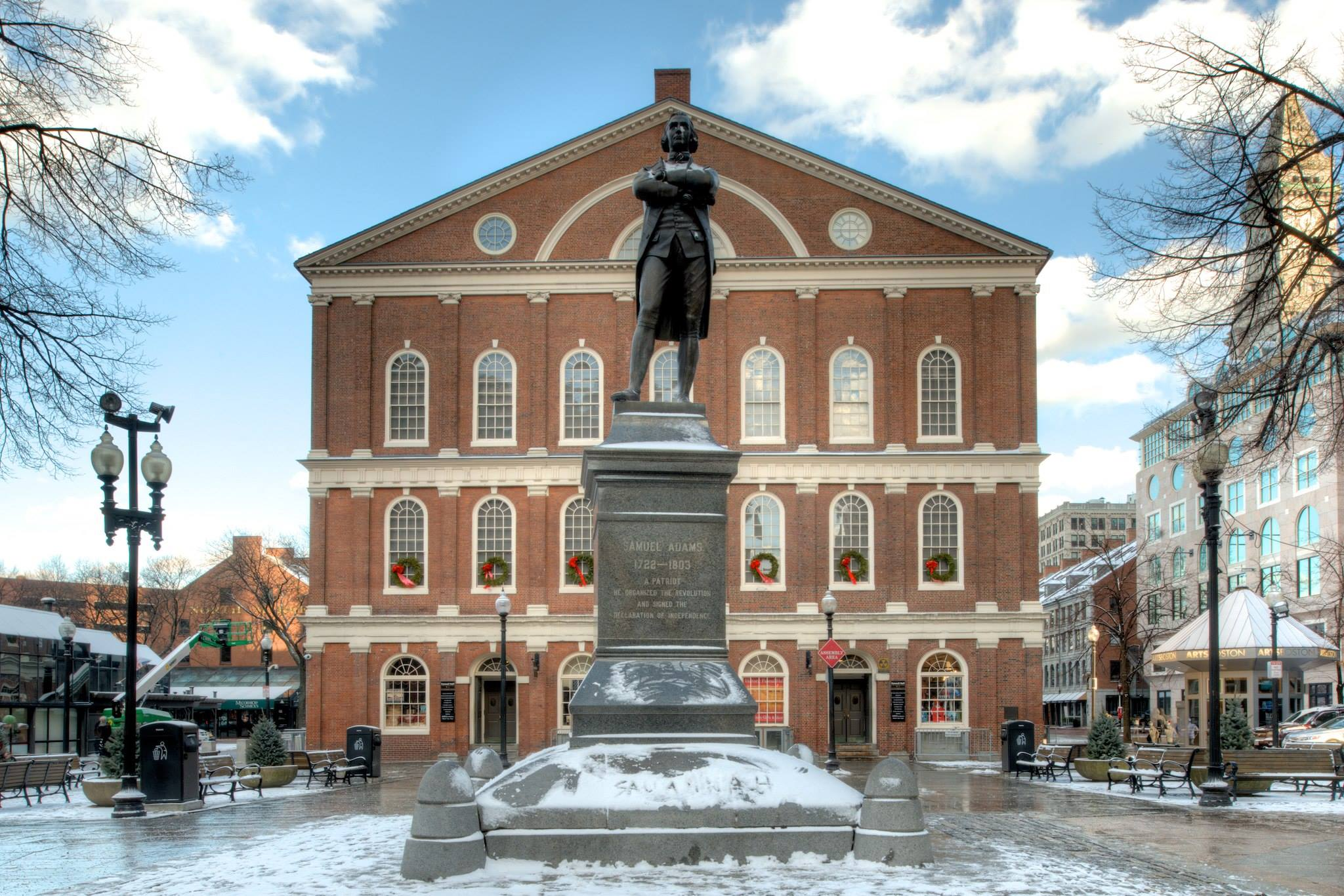
Samuel Adams, described on the 1880 statue by Anne Whitney at Faneuil Hall as "A Statesman: Incorruptible and Fearless"

West of the building is an 1880 sculpture of Samuel Adams. Created by Anne Whitney, the Adams sculpture is cast in bronze and is a replica of a similar sculpture at the United States Capitol. This sculpture sits on a Quincy granite pedestal with polished and unpolished sections.

As part of Ross Miller's artwork A Once and Future Shoreline, the granite plaza surface is marked for 850 feet (260 m) with the approximate location of the early colonial shoreline c. 1630. The work comprises etched silhouettes of seaweed, sea grass, fish, shells and other materials found along a high tide line. The street layout and building plot plan designations from an 1820 map are shown by etched dashed lines and changes from pink granite to gray granite paving slabs. The rest of the western plaza has brick and granite pavement.

== History ==
A public marketplace in the town (later city) of Boston was first organized in 1658, during the American colonial period, at the Old State House's future site. The market was effectively banned in 1695, and several attempts to establish a public market over the next several decades were unsuccessful. Northern, central, and southern markets were established in 1734, but the central market was demolished by rioters three years later.

=== 18th century ===
==== First Faneuil Hall ====
In 1740, colonial merchant and slave trader Peter Faneuil offered to donate a building "for a market for the sole use, benefit, and advantage of the town", provided the Boston Board of Selectmen voted in favor. Faneuil's offer also required that the market be regulated and continually used as such. The town voted 367–360 to accept the offer on July 14, 1740; the vote was controversial, and citizens challenged its validity. The selectmen identified a 100-by-40-foot (30 by 12 m) site in Merchants Row, which had been occupied by the 1734 central market, and approved its acquisition at a meeting on September 2, 1740. Funded in part by profits from slave trading, the building was designed by artist John Smibert in the style of an English country market. It was built primarily by mason Joshua Blanchard and carpenter Samuel Ruggles; a cornerstone with Blanchard's initials was placed outside the original building. Faneuil Hall was originally envisioned as a single-story market house before a second story for the town government was added to the plans.

The building was substantially completed in August 1742 and opened on September 10 of that year. After some debate, the building was named Faneuil Hall for its donor, and the selectmen began hosting meetings there on October 13. The original Faneuil Hall bore similarities to 17th-century English marketplaces. The two-story building, clad in brick, was designed in the early Georgian style. It had an arcaded market and offices at ground level; an assembly hall and selectmen's chamber on the second story; and an armory and assessor's office in the attic. The assembly hall could fit 1,000 people. In addition to the selectmen's chamber, the town government had offices in at least three additional rooms. After Faneuil's death in 1743, the town displayed his coat of arms at Faneuil Hall in his honor.

The marketplace struggled to attract customers or merchants, and the very idea of a marketplace remained controversial. The first merchant leased a stall there in December 1742, but the next merchant did not sign a lease for about a year. Most activity took place in the Great Hall, which was used for town meetings, public celebrations, and military drills. Social events also took place there, and some of Boston's early slave auctions took place near Faneuil Hall. The Ancient and Honorable Artillery Company of Massachusetts (colloquially the Ancients) moved into the building's attic in 1746, and the Massachusetts Governor's Council briefly moved to Faneuil Hall the next year after State House burned down. The Governor's Council moved out in 1748 once repairs to the State House were completed. Due to low patronage, the ground-floor market experienced several extended closures in 1747–1748, 1752–1753, and 1759. The building survived an earthquake in 1753, though the weathervane was damaged. The first floor had a notary public and a naval office by 1761.

==== Reconstruction and pre-Revolutionary activity ====
On January 13, 1761, the first Faneuil Hall was destroyed by fire. With nothing but the brick walls remaining, the selectmen temporarily met in any building that could accommodate them. The selectmen voted to repair Faneuil Hall that March, and the Massachusetts General Court, the legislature of the Massachusetts Bay Colony, approved a lottery to raise funds for the building. Onesiphorus Tileston and several other contractors were hired to conduct repairs, which were underway by late 1761. The selectmen moved back in during October 1762, as repairs continued. The lawyer James Otis Jr. rededicated Faneuil Hall to the "Cause of Liberty" on March 14, 1763, (Note: The 1763 date is given by multiple sources. Some sources give a different rededication date of March 14, 1764.) though interior work continued through early 1768. The new Faneuil Hall had the same dimensions as the original structure and could fit 1,000 occupants. It had less woodwork than the original structure and had a rooftop cupola rather than a steeple. Though the original hall had contained a bell, it was not reproduced, likely due to a lack of money.

After its rededication, Faneuil Hall regularly hosted speeches from pro-independence Patriots, such as Otis and Samuel Adams, and was nicknamed the "Cradle of Liberty". The selectmen allowed both Patriots and pro-British Loyalists to host events there, even while banning members of the British military and local customs officials from using it. In the years before the American Revolutionary War, the building was a frequent location for debates and protests against Parliament of Great Britain; for instance, residents protested taxes there in the 1760s. Because of its large capacity, Faneuil Hall also began hosting sessions of the General Court of Massachusetts in 1764, and it also hosted meetings of the Massachusetts Convention. Other modifications continued throughout the decade; for example, the interior was illuminated in 1767. The original weathervane was restored and installed atop the cupola next year. The market at the ground floor gained popularity as a food market.

On October 1, 1768, two thousand British troops of the 14th Foot and 29th Foot landed in Boston to occupy the city and enforce Crown authority. After disputes between the occupational force's commanders and Boston officials over where the troops would be quartered, the 14th Foot was eventually quartered in Faneuil Hall. Faneuil Hall continued to host meetings and events in the meantime, and the troops quartered there were ultimately relocated in late 1770. Events in the 1770s included the Boston Tea Party protests of 1773, along with regular town meetings and a concert in 1774. Following the American Revolutionary War breaking out in April 1775, the Continental Army began a siege of Boston, during which British troops hosted theatrical shows and stored munitions and weapons at Faneuil Hall. The marketplace was closed during the occupation. The British garrison evacuated Boston in March 1776, taking some portraits from the building. The building was left in disrepair, much to the consternation of Boston's Puritans who disapproved of the theatrical shows.

==== Post-Revolutionary use ====
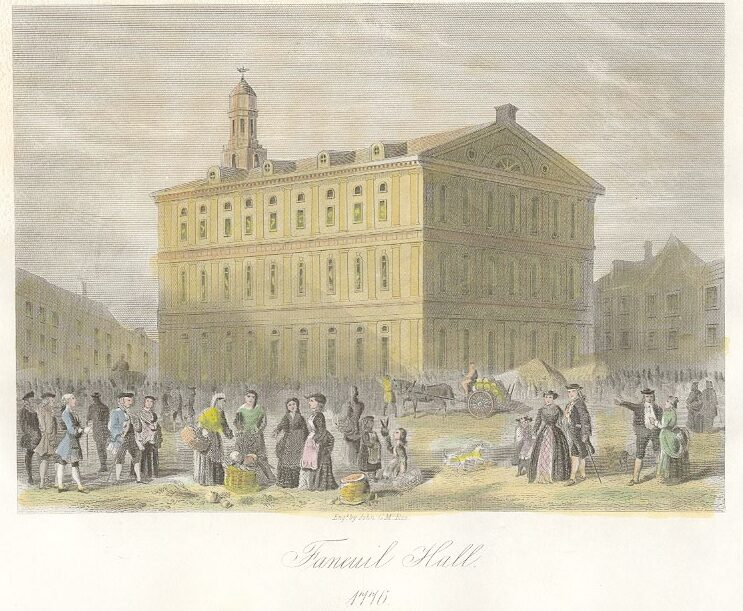
Faneuil Hall in 1776

Town meetings and gatherings at Faneuil Hall did not resume until about 1777, the year after the U.S. declared independence. The building was sometimes used for celebrations honoring dignitaries and figures allied with the Continental Army, including Count Charles Henri Hector of Estaing, Marquis de Lafayette, George Washington, and French troops. The building was also used for state lotteries and banquets. The market underneath also saw increased use, being designated as the town's produce and meat market in 1783. The selectmen awarded several contracts for repairs to Faneuil Hall during the early 1780s, including new seats, upgraded windows, and repainting. Doors were removed from the first-floor marketplace, and portraits and busts were commissioned for the upper floors. Exterior repairs also took place during that decade. Further modifications were contemplated in the 1790s, including roof repairs and interior repainting, as well as the 1791 construction of the Shambles, a rudimentary marketplace annex with extra stalls.

Though Faneuil Hall remained in use primarily as a town hall and market, it found additional uses in the late 18th century, such as military drills, worship services for Black residents of Boston, meetings of the Massachusetts Historical Society, and New Year's parties held by French residents. The ground-floor market continued to attract merchants from all over the Boston area, growing in popularity after the opening of the West Boston Bridge in 1793. Many merchants participated in Faneuil Hall's events, sometimes marching in honor of events taking place there. The market was overcrowded by the end of the century, prompting the selectmen to study the feasibility of excavating a cellar in 1799, but nothing was done at the time. The town meetings were also becoming overcrowded and sometimes had to be moved to the Old South Church.

=== 19th century ===
==== 1800s to 1820s ====
The roof was leaking by 1802, and the marketplace stalls were extended the next year. Bulfinch was selected as the chairman of the board of selectmen in March 1805, and the selectmen formed a committee to evaluate alternatives for the building. That May, he presented plans for an expansion of Faneuil Hall. Bulfinch, who had experience designing other buildings such as the new State House, was selected to design the expansion, with Jonathan Hunnewell as the master mason. Bulfinch added a third floor and attic, and he doubled the north–south width, extending Smibert's existing design northward. The third-story facade was decorated with pilasters and entablatures, complementing similar decorations in the stories below, and a new gable roof was built. The open arcades on the ground story were enclosed, and the cupola was moved to the east end of the new roof. Inside, a gallery was built above the assembly hall, providing seating for women, who could not vote on town matters. A new headquarters for the Ancients was built on the fourth floor. The final design contains several deviations from Bulfinch's plans, including the placement of entrances and interior spaces. The work was completed in March 1806. The project had cost $56,692, (Note: Equivalent to $1,300,000 in 2024) and the debt was not repaid for several years. Faneuil Hall largely retained its original design for most of the century.

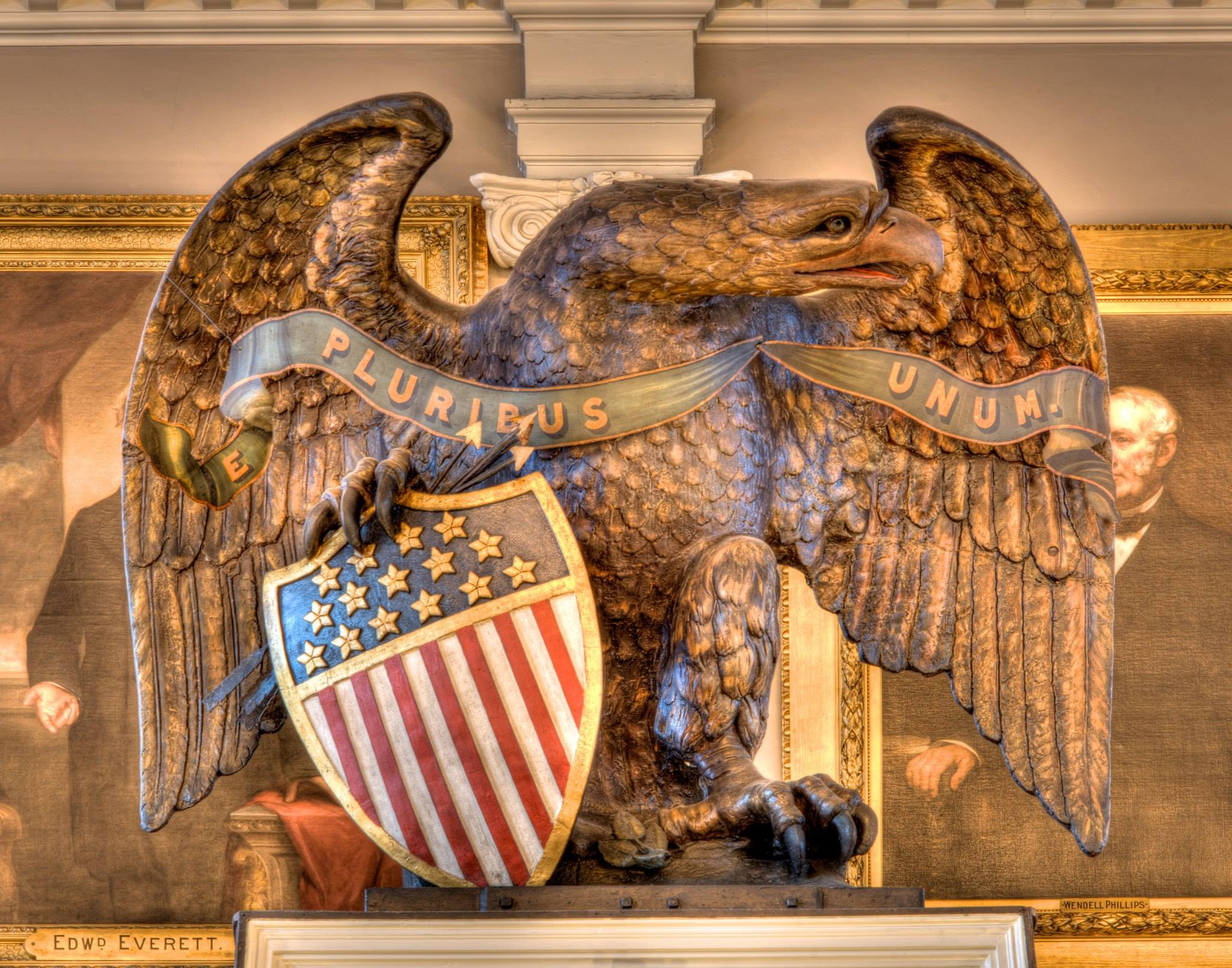
Eagle statue in the Great Hall, installed 1824

The expanded building had cellars available for rent; a market; and offices for the selectmen, assessors, the Boston Board of Health, and the treasurer. The selectmen met on the second floor, and meetings were hosted in the expanded assembly room, the Great Hall. Faneuil Hall shortly began accommodating a variety of events, including anti-British protests before and during the War of 1812, along with parties and Independence Day celebrations. The clerk of Faneuil Hall's market was given his own office in 1813, and a residents' patrol group was allowed to convene there starting in 1816. During the late 1810s and early 1820s, the selectmen authorized several renovations to the interior and exterior. A bust of President John Adams was installed in the Great Hall in 1818, and a stone eagle was installed there in 1824. Meanwhile, the marketplace had again become overcrowded, and conditions in the marketplace had become unsanitary. An early-1820s proposal to extend the building eastward was never carried out, and plans for further refurbishments in 1821 were delayed.

Faneuil Hall was used for town meetings until 1822, when Boston became a city and the board of selectmen was replaced by the Boston City Council. The newly established city charter prevented Faneuil Hall from being sold or leased, instead preserving it for "the free use of the people". Mayor Josiah Quincy III advocated the construction of an entirely new marketplace to the east, Quincy Market, which was constructed between 1824 and 1826. All of Faneuil Hall's merchants were relocated to the new marketplace in 1827. The same year, Alexander Parris, who had built the Quincy Market buildings, was hired to renovate Faneuil Hall. Parris's plans included renovating the first floor and basement; he also planned a westward extension of the building, which was never built. The first floor was subdivided into eight storefronts, and the exterior was repainted.

==== 1830s to early 1890s ====
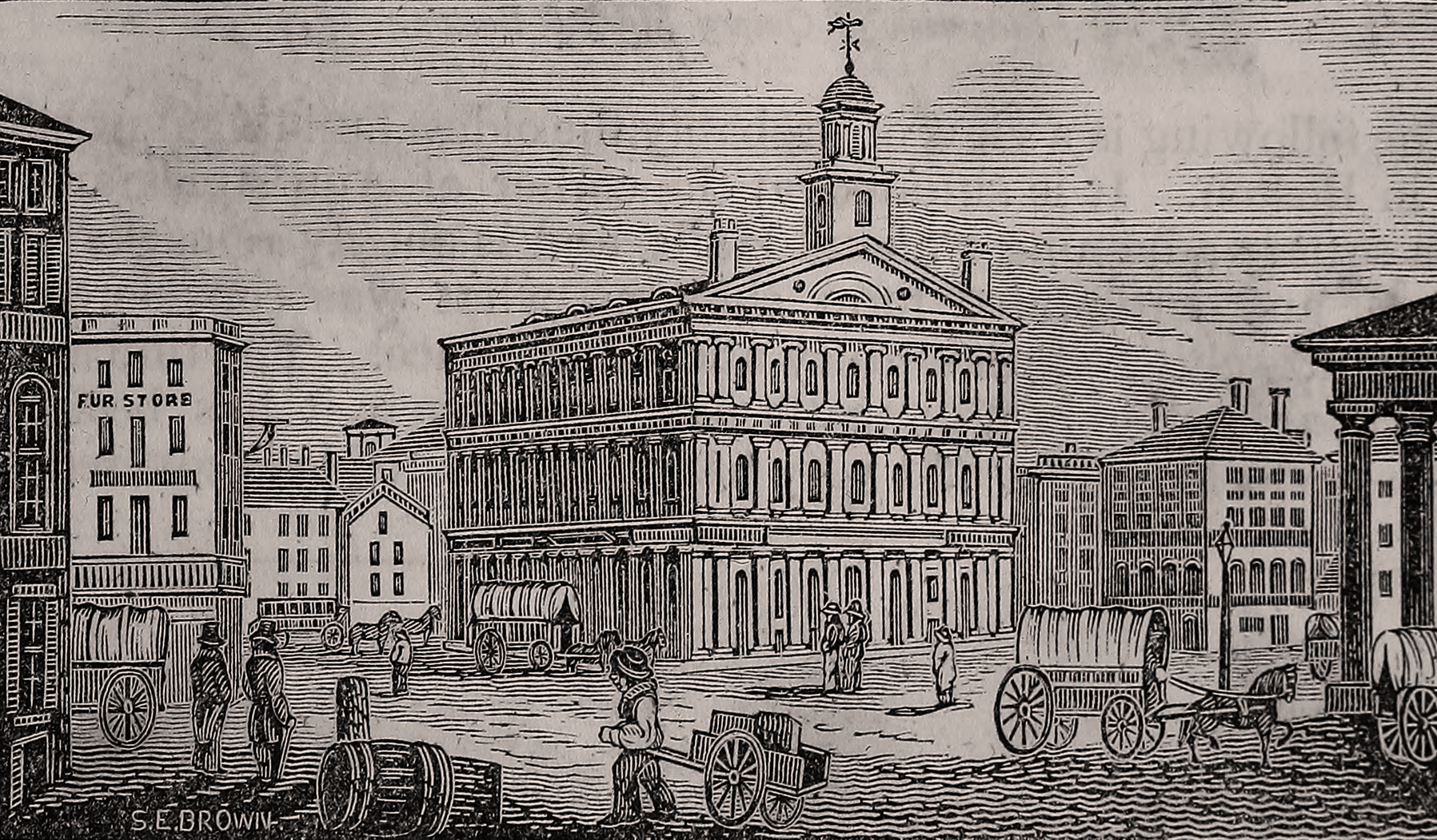
1839 engraving of Faneuil Hall

Following the 1820s renovations, the building's tenants included goods stores, a poorhouse, and (on the upper floors) military groups. Although Faneuil Hall was no longer used as a marketplace or a town meetinghouse, it was still a popular place for speeches and other events. Any event could use the Great Hall if 50 registered voters signed a petition supporting it. Speeches were originally limited to local matters but were gradually expanded to cover a wider range of topics; during the mid-19th century, speeches on abolition were particularly prominent. Notable speakers there included John Quincy Adams, Jefferson Davis, Frederick Douglass, and William Lloyd Garrison. The building also hosted balls, eulogies, military drills, and receptions. Parties at Faneuil Hall were hosted for such figures as President Andrew Jackson; François d'Orléans, Prince of Joinville; and Alexander Baring, 1st Baron Ashburton. Faneuil Hall was a popular meeting place for mechanics' groups, with the Massachusetts Charitable Mechanic Association holding fairs there from 1837 onward. A footbridge connected Faneuil Hall to Quincy Market's central building, allowing events to be held across both buildings. Faneuil Hall also sometimes served as an emergency accommodation for displaced people or agencies.

With Faneuil Hall being increasingly busy, Parris's protege Gridley J. F. Bryant proposed upgrading the Great Hall in the 1840s, and a rostrum of his design was subsequently installed there. A clock was added to the Great Hall in 1850, and George Healy's painting of the Webster–Hayne debate was mounted there around that time. Portraits were installed in that room. The Great Hall had been illuminated by a single chandelier until the early 1850s, when sconces were installed at gallery level. Bryant also proposed expanding the Great Hall into the attic space; this was not carried out, although several rooms were repaired for the Ancients' use. A stair to the rostrum was built as well. Market operations at the original Faneuil Hall resumed in 1858. Meat merchants became the primary tenants of the original Faneuil Hall, which continued until the 1970s.

A new bell, installed in Faneuil Hall's cupola in 1867, was used by lookouts to report fires in northern Boston. Following the Great Boston Fire of 1872, the building hosted a post office for three months. The building was repainted in the early 1870s, and a new rostrum and candelabras were likely installed in the Great Hall around that time. Faneuil Hall had been identified as a fire hazard as early as 1875, though nothing happened for two decades other than the relocation of some paintings. The cupola was leaning by 1894, and Boston's fire commissioner had directed that the lookout stop ringing Faneuil Hall's bell. The old plaster and wood were decaying as well. The city's building commissioner John Damrell said in July 1894 that Faneuil Hall needed to be fireproofed (but that the cupola was "strong and not decaying"), and Damrell wrote in a report the next year that the building was vulnerable to fire.

==== 1890s fireproofing ====
By 1898, the building commissioner's office had condemned the property as a "fire trap" four times in fourteen years. Although an appropriation to fix the property had been pending since 1892, the City Council had not approved it; the attic was also sagging. The Ancients, which were forced to relocate elsewhere within the building, expressed concerns about the flammable meat storage and the lack of emergency exits. Historical societies and other local organizations advocated for Faneuil Hall's renovation, citing the building's historical significance. The idea of rebuilding Faneuil Hall was finally taken seriously after the fatal Merrimac Street fire of 1898. The City Council ultimately allocated $103,000 for reconstructing Faneuil Hall with fireproof material. (Note: Equivalent to $3,305,000 in 2024) (Note: Sources disagree on whether $1,500 (equivalent to $58,000 in 2025) or $15,000 (equivalent to $581,000 in 2025) was spent on furnishings.) Chief architect Frank W. Howard and consultant F. W. Chandler were hired to oversee the redesign.

A contract to rebuild Faneuil Hall was awarded in July 1898 to the firm of Woodbury & Leighton. This process involved replacing combustible wooden design details with iron, steel, and stone replicas; the old woodwork was placed into storage. The foundations, which rested on mud, were rebuilt, and the old walls and floors were removed. Steel columns were built through the first floor to support the new structure, the main stair was rebuilt, the lamps outside the entrance were electrified, and new heating and ventilation systems were added. Inside, the Great Hall's decorations were replaced, and fireplace mantels were replaced in two other rooms. A restroom and a matron's room were constructed, and the attic was raised slightly to provide space for steel girders. The cupola was reconstructed; the weathervane was regilded; and the roof was replaced, necessitating the construction of a temporary membrane. Bulfinch's wooden doors were retained, as the contractors deemed their replacement unnecessary. A mechanical plant and electrical lighting were also installed. All of the woodwork had been replaced by June 1899, and the building was ready for occupancy again by October. The Ancients moved back in during January 1900.

=== 20th century ===
==== 1900s to 1920s ====
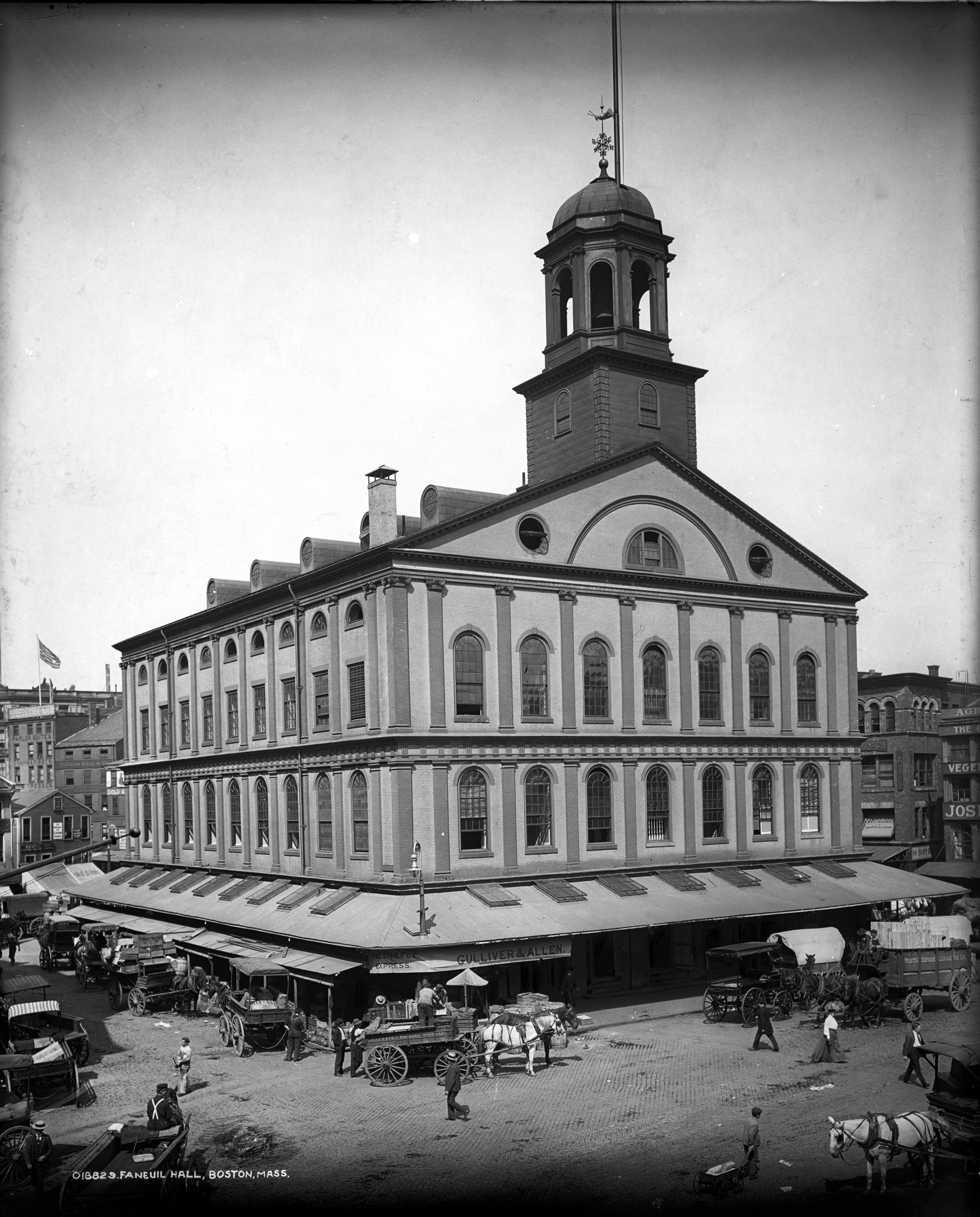
Faneuil Hall in 1903

Despite its reconstruction, the building required additional upgrades in the early 20th century. The Sons of the Revolution's Massachusetts chapter dedicated a tablet at Faneuil Hall in 1908, commemorating the structure's history. Boston's building department mandated the installation of exterior fire escapes in 1911. Some portraits in the Great Hall were temporarily removed; there were plans to downsize Healy's Webster–Hayne painting, but it was ultimately retained with a smaller frame. Following opposition to the original fire-escape proposal, Mayor James M. Curley directed the Boston Society of Architects to devise an alternate plan costing $50,000. (Note: Equivalent to $1,118,000 in 2024) The plans, drawn up by the society's president Ralph A. Cram, were approved in 1916 and entailed constructing two stairways, installing fireproof partitions inside, and cleaning the exterior. The City Council authorized the city to raise $68,000 in 1917. (Note: Equivalent to $1,094,000 in 2024) Due to a shortage of coal, the building was not heated for several years during the late 1910s, prompting city officials to study adding an oil boiler. A tablet commemorating the Boston city government's centennial was installed at Faneuil Hall in 1922.

The renovation began in January 1923, when Cram's firm Cram & Ferguson was hired to conduct the repairs. Merchants within Faneuil Hall were temporarily relocated, and the interior was renovated. The project included new partitions, stairways, sprinklers, a concrete floor under the market level, and an exterior repainting. Existing exterior paint was removed from the brick facade, and the stonework decorations were removed and replicated. A spiral stair was removed as well. The Ancients proposed installing an elevator, but the public opposed the idea as ahistorical. Cram wanted to remove Healy's painting, which he felt was out of scale, but the Boston Art Commission refused the request following protests. Ultimately, only one stair was installed, and a proposed entrance to the basement was not built. U.S. Army general John J. Pershing rededicated the building on April 19, 1925. As part of another project to beautify the approach to Faneuil Hall, adjacent buildings in Dock Square were demolished in the late 1920s.

==== 1930s to 1960s ====
The building attracted many tourists by the 1930s, and the surrounding area was seeing increased congestion. Some merchants actually did relocate. The heating system was upgraded and an elevator added between 1935 and 1936, after which the building remained structurally unchanged for three decades. At Faneuil Hall's 200th anniversary, it remained in use as a meeting hall and marketplace, though the Quincy Market footbridge had long since been removed. The building was still open daily in the mid-20th century. The marketplace continued to sell produce and meat, and the Great Hall upstairs hosted events—although some events were banned. The Great Hall's gallery level had been closed, and progressively fewer people were giving speeches or hosting meetings there.

The cupola and weathervane were restored in 1946, and the Great Hall's portraits were cleaned the next year. During the late 1940s, there were calls to clear the surrounding buildings and to relocate the ground-floor marketplace. At the time, there were approximately 75 tenants. The state's Market Authority, in 1949, recommended relocating the marketplaces at Faneuil Hall and Quincy Market; the idea of relocating the marketplace was set aside for several years. While much of the area was razed in the early 1950s for the Central Artery highway, Faneuil Hall itself escaped demolition. In 1951, the Office of Price Stabilization opened an office at Faneuil Hall, and the Ancients donated a public piano; the weathervane was restored the next year. A set of chimes, donated by merchant Harry J. Blake, was installed in 1953, and organ recitals began two years later after an organ was installed.

A relocation of the marketplace was again suggested in the 1950s, and Mayor John Hynes established a committee in 1958 to suggest future uses for the building. Several proposals were put forth, although historical societies opposed plans to change it to a visitor center or tourist trap. There was substantial disagreement over whether the marketplace merited preservation in itself or whether these activities should be relocated. By then, the building had 40,000 annual visitors. Following a 1959 report by the National Fire Protection Association, which found several fire hazards in the building, local groups raised $10,000 for restoration. (Note: Equivalent to $82,000 in 2024) Workers repainted the building and installed fire-safety equipment in 1961, and the feasibility of constructing additional staircases and removing Healy's painting was also studied. The Boston government turned over operation of Faneuil Hall to the United States government c. 1961. The merchants still had not been relocated by the mid-1960s, and following a preservation study, the Boston government announced plans in 1968 to restore the Faneuil Hall area for $10 million. (Note: Equivalent to $68,643,000 in 2024) The next year, the United States Department of Housing and Urban Development awarded a $100,000 grant for the restoration of Faneuil Hall's facade. (Note: Equivalent to $654,000 in 2024)

==== 1970s to 1990s ====
The Hollis Drug Co. pharmacy became Faneuil Hall's first non-food merchant in 1970, over two centuries after the building's completion, with the food merchants having relocated to larger, more modern facilities. The Boston Redevelopment Authority awarded a contract to convert Faneuil Hall and the neighboring market buildings into the Faneuil Hall Marketplace, a festival marketplace, in 1971. A gift shop subsequently opened on Faneuil Hall's first floor, while silversmith Jamie Goodchild renovated the cellar and opened a store there. During the same decade, the canopies outside the building were removed. The weathervane was recovered and restored in 1974 after being stolen. The marketplace opened in 1976, and the next year, the Hollis pharmacy was replaced by a restaurant and a bakery, which took up all the ground-floor space. The firm of Oldham, Soforenki & Priestly Inc. devised a master plan for the building in the late 1970s, and the BosTix booth, selling live performance tickets, opened in August 1979.

During the late 20th century, Faneuil Hall continued to host events. The building housed a museum about the marketplace, in addition to some shops. It had nine vendors by the mid-1980s, who donated $1 million for a future renovation in exchange for reduced rents. (Note: Equivalent to $2,469,000 in 2024) By then, the building was in poor shape compared with the Quincy Market complex; the utility systems were outdated, and the interiors had leaks, cracks, and rotting beams. The National Park Service (NPS) was conducting minor repairs by 1985, and the city and the Ancients were planning a fundraising drive. That April, U.S. Representative Joe Moakley requested federal funds for further renovations. A three-year accessibility upgrade was completed that December and included a hydraulic lift, call buttons for disabled patrons, and an audio induction loop. Ultimately, Congress proposed a combined $8.6 million for Faneuil Hall and the Old State House, (Note: Equivalent to $21,234,000 in 2024) allocating $600,000 for Faneuil Hall's design. (Note: Equivalent to $1,481,000 in 2024) Congress allocated $5 million in 1988 for Faneuil Hall's renovation, (Note: Equivalent to $11,407,000 in 2024) and a campaign to raise another $5 million commenced shortly afterward. (Note: Equivalent to $10,976,000 in 2024)

The NPS evicted the tenants in August 1990 in advance of an $8 million renovation. (Note: Equivalent to $16,925,000 in 2024) The next month, the building closed for a renovation overseen by Goody, Clancy & Associates. During the project, archeologists found evidence of an old garbage dump at the site. The building reopened in 1992, and the storefronts on the ground floor were completed two years later. The lower stories had souvenir shops; the second-floor meeting hall remained intact, though it was scarcely used except for naturalization ceremonies and concerts. The Ancients continued to occupy their third-floor space, which was open for public tours. Business declined in the 1990s because of the opening of upscale restaurants elsewhere, as well as the nearby Big Dig highway project.

=== 21st century ===
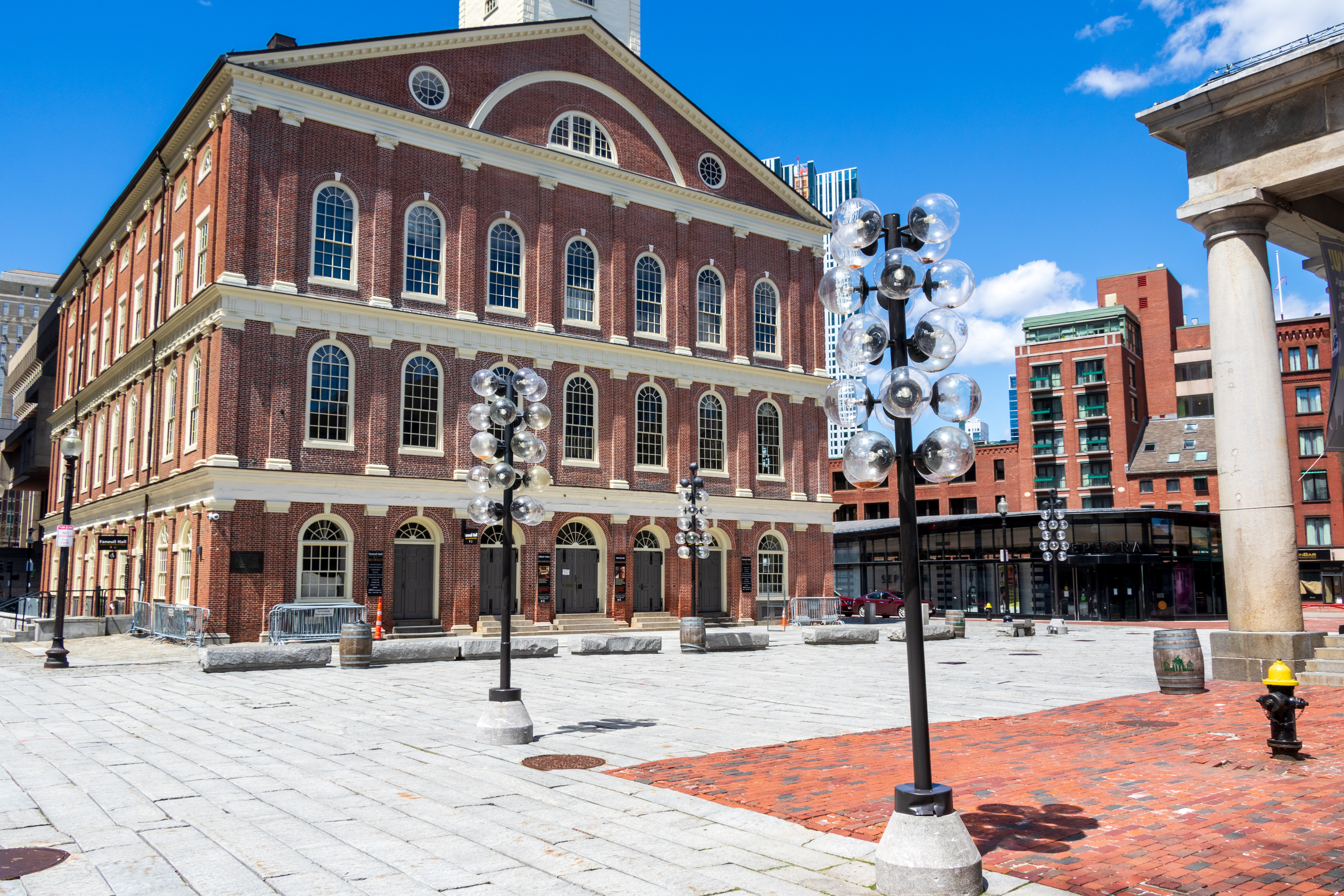
The building's eastern elevation, seen in 2020

By the early 2000s, the marketplace as a whole attracted 15 million visitors, of which 45,000 visited the Ancients' headquarters on Faneuil Hall's fourth floor. To attract more visitors, Mayor Thomas Menino announced in 2003 that some of the ground-floor retail space would be replaced with a visitor center. The city government also proposed increasing the Great Hall's rental fees in the late 2000s. Plans for the visitor center were delayed until 2010, when the NPS announced that the ground floor would be renovated; work began that November, funded with $6 million from the city and federal governments. (Note: Equivalent to $8,400,000 in 2024) The project included exhibit areas, a bookstore, and a film screening area, and the site underwent archeological excavations during the renovation. The visitor center was completed in May 2012, while the Grand Hall remained unchanged.

At the end of 2017, the city government announced that Faneuil Hall would temporarily close for $4 million worth of renovation. (Note: Equivalent to $5,019,000 in 2024) The modifications included repairing water damage, upgrading mechanical systems, and restoring woodwork, as well as upgrading the elevator and wheelchair lift. The building reopened in May 2018. Following calls to rename the building because of Peter Faneuil's ties to slavery (see Faneuil Hall § Name), Mayor Marty Walsh endorsed a proposal by Steve Locke to design a memorial to slaves outside the building, but Locke withdrew the plan. Business at the Faneuil Hall Marketplace suffered during the COVID-19 pandemic in 2020, and visitation took years to recover. A permanent exhibit on slavery opened within Faneuil Hall in 2023, and the BosTix discount-ticket booth reopened in 2024.

== Architecture ==
The original building was designed by artist John Smibert and was the only building he ever designed, as Smibert was generally a painter. The current configuration dates to an 1806 renovation designed by architect Charles Bulfinch, who expanded the footprint to 80 by 102 feet (24 by 31 m). The exterior form remains largely unchanged from Bulfinch's expansion. The only remaining portions of Smibert's original design are parts of the eastern and southern walls and a safe that survived the 1761 fire. As expanded by Bulfinch in 1806, Faneuil Hall measures four stories high, including the attic.

=== Exterior ===
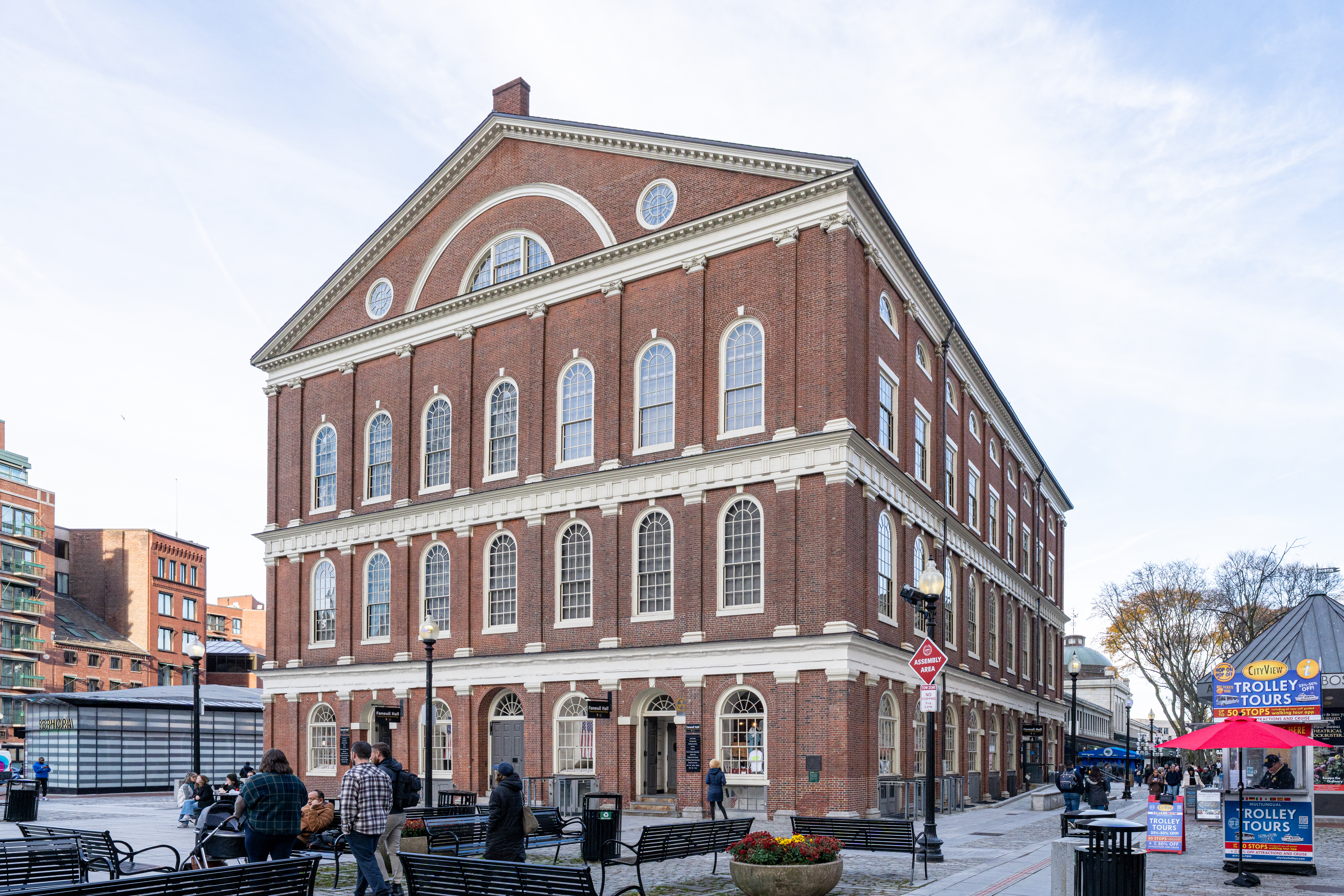
The western elevation

==== Facade ====
The northern and southern elevations of the brick facade are divided vertically into nine bays, while the western and eastern elevations are divided into seven bays. The window and door openings on each elevation are symmetrical. The brickwork is red and is laid in Flemish bond. The original 1742 walls, which are partially extant on the southern side of the present building, are slightly darker and rougher than the later brickwork. Other decorations are painted a cream color. There is a commemorative plaque, dated 1930, on the eastern elevation near the southwestern corner.

The first-story openings are arched and contain sash windows from Bulfinch's expansion, when the formerly-outdoor marketplace was placed indoors. The springers of the arches originally had impost blocks, but the imposts were removed from alternating windows in the 1827 renovation. On the primary or eastern elevation, all except the outermost bays have paneled doors; the second-outermost bays have doors leading to the first floor, while the three center bays lead to the grand staircase. On the western elevation facing Congress Street, the entrances are in the second-outermost bays and the middle bay. As built, the entrances were flanked by lanterns on wrought iron brackets. Another entrance, on the southern elevation, provides disability access. There are some windows and doorways under the first floor, which overlook the basement. The upper stories contain sash windows. On the second story, and the western and eastern elevations of the third story, the tops of the windows bear round arches with limestone keystones. The keystones have been described as carved busts of English variety star Dolly Bidwell. The northern and southern elevations have rectangular sash windows, topped by detached semicircular lunettes.

Each bay is separated by a single pilaster, while the extreme ends of each elevation have two pilasters each. The Tuscan-style pilasters on the first story and the Doric pilasters on the second story are part of Smibert's original design and were emulated in Bulfinch's annex. The third story has Ionic pilasters, which are entirely of Bulfinch's design. The entablatures above each story are designed in the same style as the pilasters below them; the entablatures above the first-floor windows are made of brownstone, while the second- and third-story entablatures are made of wood. The second-story Doric entablature has triglyphs, and the Ionic entablature has modillions. The entablatures are topped by protruding limestone cornices. Atop the western and eastern elevations are tympana with an architrave containing a lunette, along with a cornice decorated with modillions. These lunettes are flanked by porthole-like bullseye windows (sometimes described as ox-eye windows).

==== Roof ====
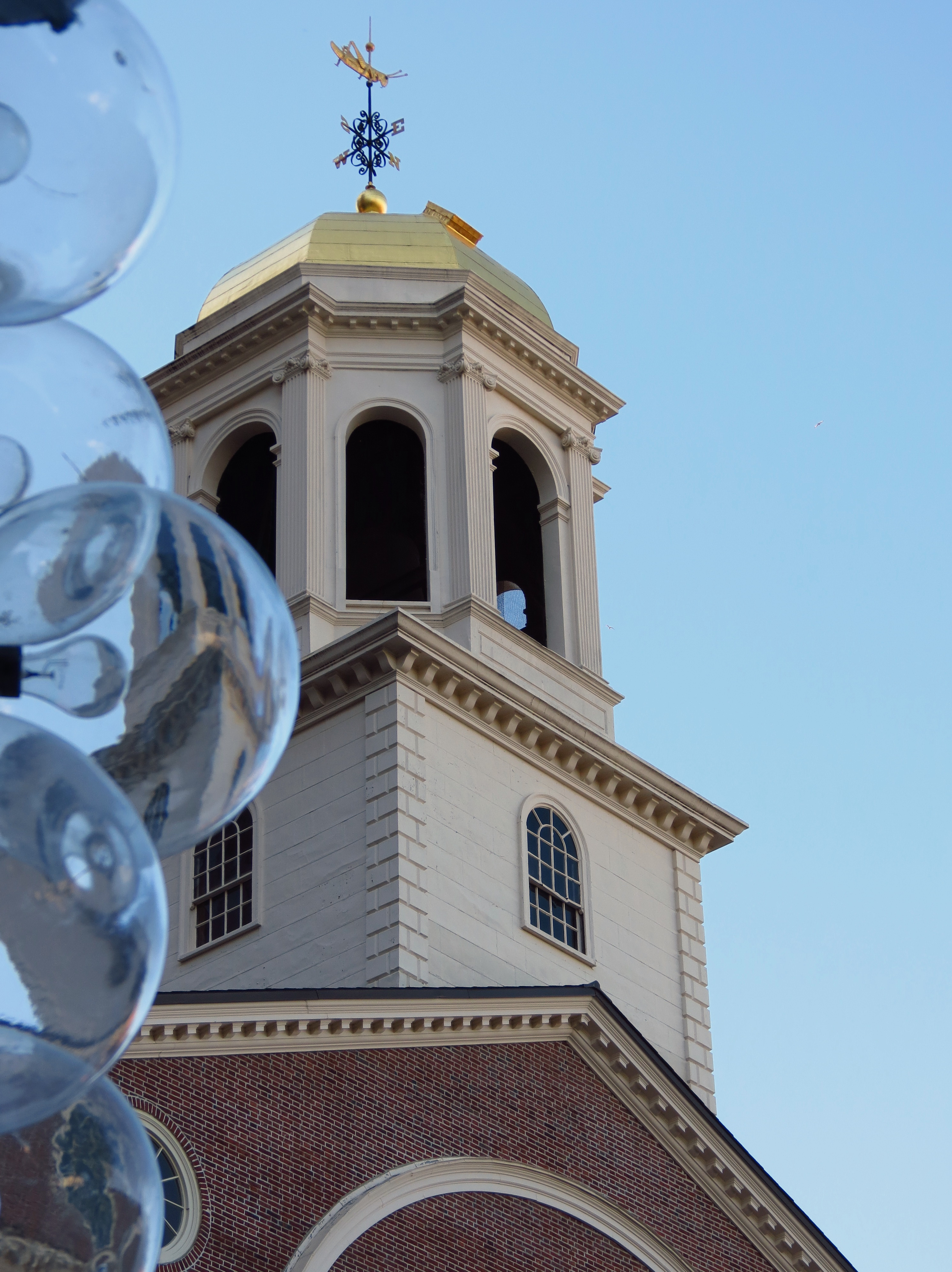
The cupola, with weathervane atop it

The gable roof is oriented west–east and is clad in slate shingles, which slope downward to the north and south. There are dormer windows protruding from the gable on both sides; each gable is surrounded by a cornice with limestone dentils. Each dormer has an ox-eye window. There are also two chimneys, dating from Bulfinch's expansion. In addition, the building had an 8-by-10-foot (2.4 by 3.0 m) U.S. flag, which in the 20th century was the largest such flag at a public building in Boston.

Above the roof is a cupola, which was originally located at the center of the roof before being moved to the eastern end during the 1806 renovation. The original wooden cupola was rebuilt in steel during the late 1890s renovation. The lower part of the cupola is a square tower with louvers on its western elevation and windows on its other elevations. The upper part of the cupola is a belfry, which contains a bell dating from 1867. (Note: One source cites the bell as dating from 1866, which is the year it was cast.) The bell's clapper ceased to function at the end of World War II in 1945 (though it had been manually rung several times after that with a mallet). The bell began ringing again in 2007 when the stuck clapper was freed and lubricated and new bellrope attached to the bell.

There is a gilded weathervane, shaped like a grasshopper, atop the belfry's dome. The vane, created by Shem Drowne in 1742, weighs 25 pounds (11 kg). The reason for the grasshopper shape is not agreed on. One theory is that the vane was modeled after that of the London Royal Exchange, itself based upon the family crest of Thomas Gresham, while another possible origin is that Drowne had chased grasshoppers when he was younger. Other, more apocryphal etymologies claim that the Faneuil family's coat of arms had a grasshopper or that merchants liked the insect. The vane contains a time capsule with artifacts such as newspapers and currency, which rattled around inside until 1952. The vane was described by Historic Preservation magazine as "one of America's best-known weathervanes", and people often called the surrounding area "Grasshopper Market". According to legend, knowledge of the vane (or lack thereof) has been used to identify enemy spies in the War of 1812 and to pick out people who falsely claimed to be Boston citizens.

=== Interior ===
Inside Faneuil Hall are many paintings and sculpture busts of Revolutionary War activists, pre–Civil War abolitionists, and political leaders. The building's Great Hall contains a series of portraits and a George Healy painting from 1850; the portraits are generally replicas of works held by the Museum of Fine Arts, while Healy's original painting remains in situ. Throughout the building, floors are generally made of marble and cement, and stair columns are made of steel and cement. The interior spaces are connected by an elevator, making the public spaces disability-accessible. During the 1890s, a heating coil and a fan were installed, supplying air throughout the building.

==== Lower stories and staircase ====
The basement level is surrounded by a stone foundation wall, which has been covered with plaster in many places. Cold storage rooms are situated outside the wall at each corner. The rest of the basement is used for offices and education.

The first (ground) floor contains the market area, a space measuring 76 by 100 feet (23 by 30 m) across. This space has a concrete floor covered with terrazzo tiles, brick walls, cast-iron and concrete supports, and a ceiling of brick vaults. The north and south walls each have a west–east array of concrete piers, flanking three west–east arrays of cast iron columns, which divide the space into bays. There are stalls at the center and the north and south walls, creating an H-shaped floor plan. The west and east walls have Colonial Revival-style entrances. The southeast corner has a glass-and-wood booth or stall decorated in the Colonial Revival style. In the late 20th century, the market area retained some vestiges of its original use, including meat hooks and signage.

From the eastern entrance, a wide granite staircase rises to the Great Hall's second-story entrance, with two intermediate landings. Above that, the staircase continues to the fourth story, with landings stacked atop each other. The staircase is illuminated by lamps attached to cast-iron support columns. The staircase's current cast-iron construction dates to the 1898–1899 renovation. Most of the doorways leading off the staircases are designed in the Greek Revival style and date from the 1820s renovation, except the doors to the Great Hall and the Ancients' anterooms, which were added by Bulfinch. The top of the stairs has fanlights designed by Bulfinch.

==== Great Hall ====
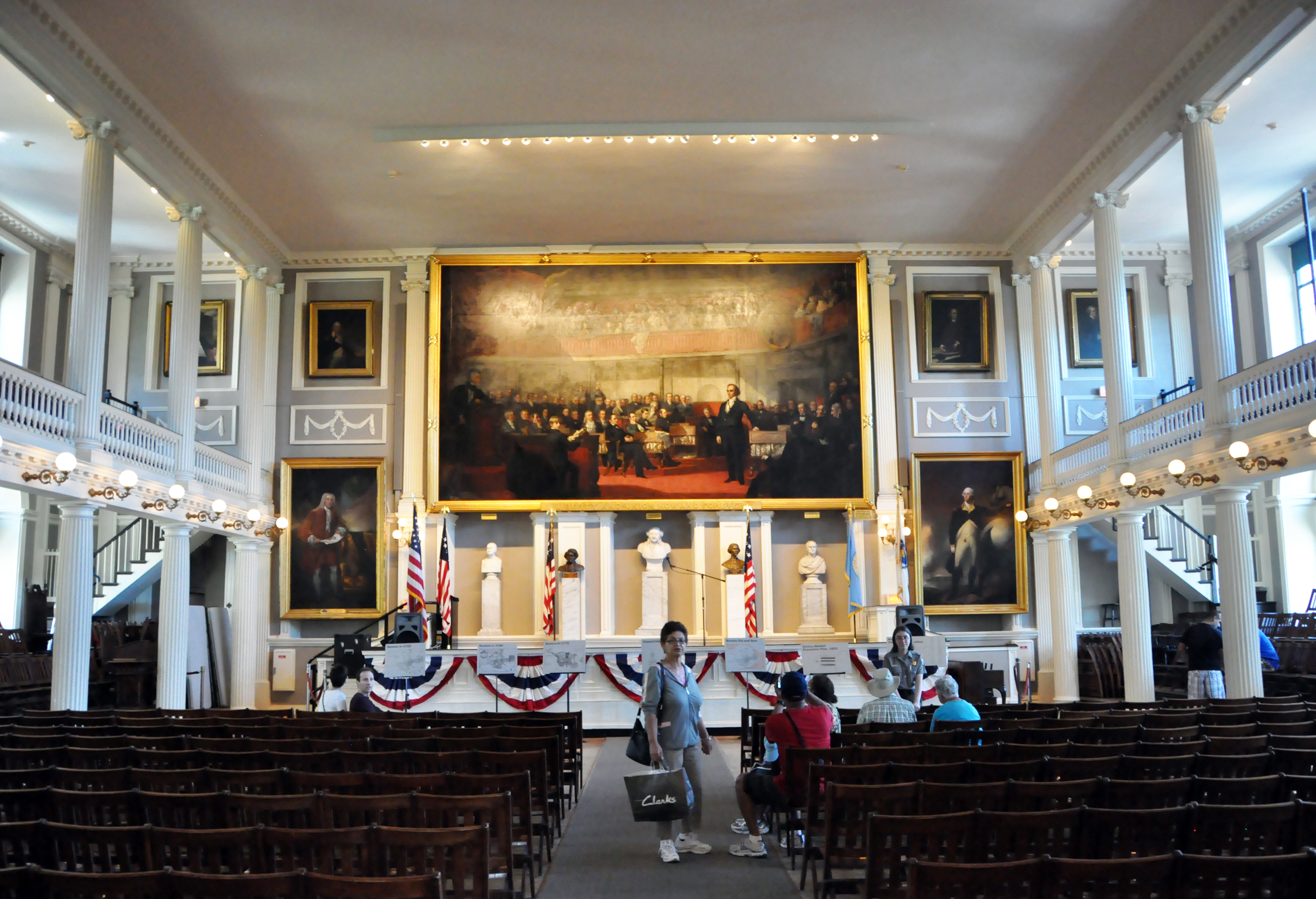
View of the Great Hall toward the west

The second floor is primarily occupied by the lower level of the neoclassical-style Great Hall, measuring 28 feet (8.5 m) high and 76 by 76 feet (23 by 23 m) across. This space, fitting 856 occupants, is accessed from the main stairway via a set of paneled doors designed by Bulfinch. There is a rostrum on the west wall, while the room's other three sides are surrounded by a third-floor gallery. The columns supporting the galleries are replicas of the original Doric-style columns installed by Bulfinch. Beneath the gallery, the pilasters on the second floor's outer walls are paneled and are designed in the Ionic order. Between the pilasters are the sash windows of the facade.

The Great Hall's lower level has a wooden floor. The Great Hall has folding seats that flank a central aisle, facing the rostrum. Additional seating is located on the northern and southern sides of the second floor. The rostrum itself has a wooden stage and oak podium. It is flanked by a pair of staircases at the northwest and southeast corners of the room, which lead to the gallery and have perforated risers for easier ventilation. The wall behind the rostrum is decorated with George Healy's oil painting, (Note: The name of Healy's painting is variously cited as Webster Replying to Hayne, Webster's Reply to Hayne, or Liberty and Union, Now and Forever.) which measures 16 by 30 feet (4.9 by 9.1 m) and depicts the Webster–Hayne debate and 130 notable American figures. The wall on either side of the painting has decorations such as swag motifs, busts, and niches. The western wall also has deep openings with terracotta block infill (which once contained windows), in addition to portraits. There are also arches with keystones carved by Daniel Reynert in the shape of cherub heads.

The gallery has more seats overlooking the rostrum. The columns from the lower level continue through the gallery, supporting an entablature on the ceiling; a paneled balustrade runs between these columns. At the rear (east) end of the Great Hall, the balustrade contains a stone eagle, next to which is a clock donated by the children of Boston. There are sconces mounted onto the cornice, along with light fixtures hanging from a lotus blossom–shaped escutcheon in the middle of the ceiling.

==== Other upper-story spaces ====
Portraits of diplomat Anson Burlingame and U.S. Vice President Henry Wilson, a plaque, and a commemorative tablet are displayed on the second floor. There are also small offices on the second floor, leading off the Great Hall and the stair landing. These include the superintendent's office (also known as the custodian's room) at the northeast corner, which measures 20 by 20 feet (6.1 by 6.1 m) across. The superintendent's office bears Colonial Revival decorations, including a fireplace mantel and chimney piece. There is another room on the southeast corner, across the staircase landing. Known as the Boston Art Commission and Park Service Room, it has decorations dating from the late 1890s, including a smaller brick mantel. There are estrooms for men and women on the second and third floors, respectively.

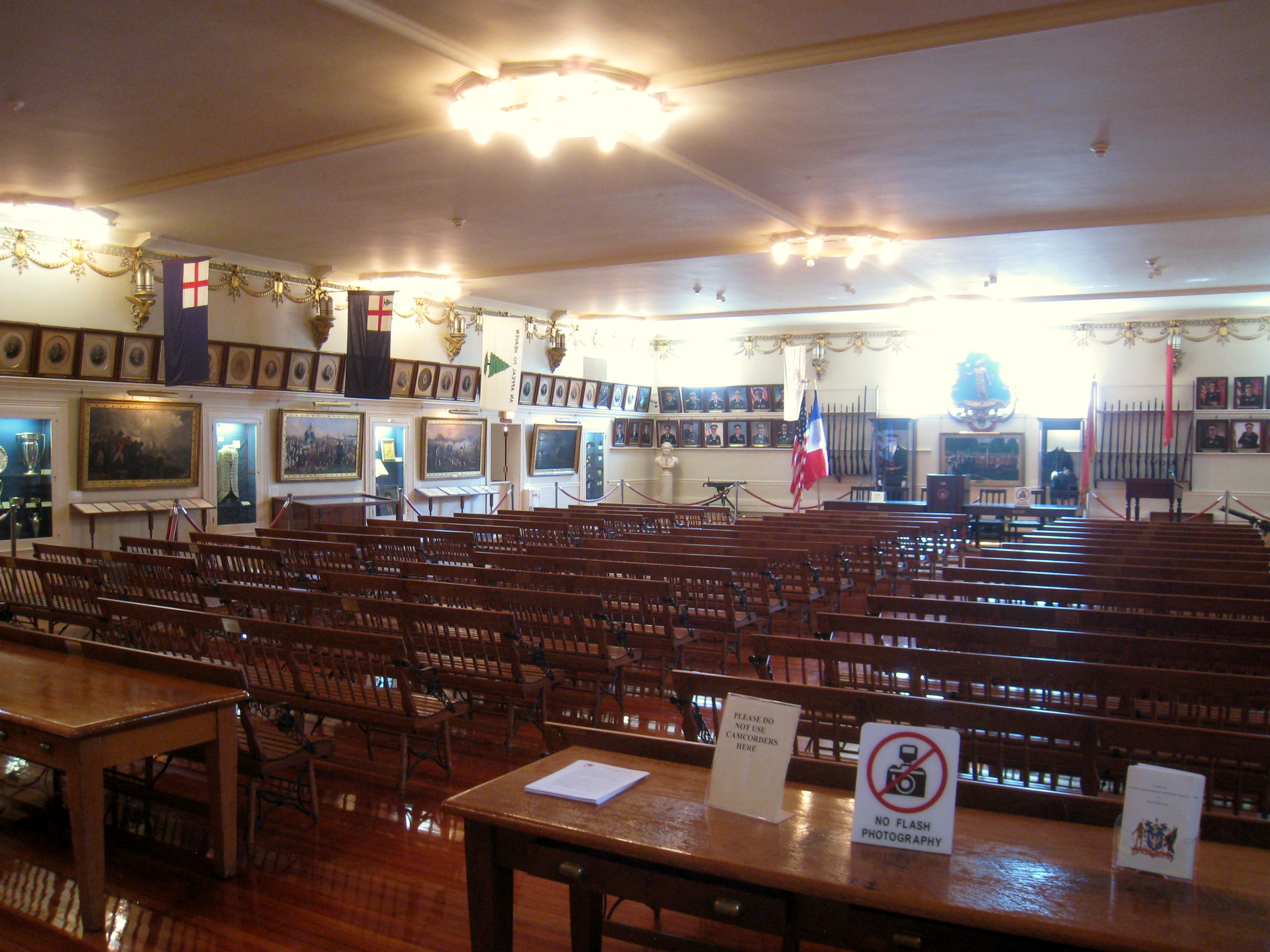
The Ancient and Honorable Artillery Company's central hall

The fourth floor, or attic, is the headquarters of the Ancient and Honorable Artillery Company of Massachusetts. The center of this floor has a hall measuring 48 by 76 feet (15 by 23 m) across. The space measured 30 by 76 feet (9.1 by 23.2 m) across, but, to accommodate new roof trusses, was expanded by 18 feet (5.5 m) during the 1890s renovation. The walls are made of plaster. The northern and southern walls each have seven doors, which originally led to barrel-vaulted artillery storage rooms; Bulfinch's plans showed ten such rooms. The western wall has a lunette window and, below that, a 5-by-7-foot (1.5 by 2.1 m) rendering of the Great Seal of Massachusetts. There are benches at the middle of the room, which are made of iron and wood. An ornate, gilded frieze with military decorations runs atop the walls. The ceiling is made of plaster, with raised moldings creating a grid; the intersections of these moldings contain circles with light bulbs. Four dormer windows each to the north and south, embedded in the roof, also illuminate the space.

East of the Ancient and Honorable Assembly Company's hall, a staircase ascends to a commandery room just below Faneuil Hall's cupola. The 13 risers in this staircase have embedded plaques with the names of the Thirteen Colonies. The commandery room itself measures 48 by 14 feet (14.6 by 4.3 m) and is illuminated by elliptical windows in the coved ceiling and by a lunette and bullseye windows from the east. On the commandery room's perimeter are pairs of Ionic columns, which support the coved ceiling.

== Name ==
Peter Faneuil was of French Huguenot descent, and there is disagreement over how his name was pronounced. The pronunciation is variously given as /ˈfænəl/ (FAN-el, rhyming with "panel"); /ˈfʌnəl/ (FUN-el, "funnel"); or /ˈfænjəl/ (FAN-yel, rhyming with "Daniel"). Faneuil himself preferred the FAN-el pronunciation, but residents often pronounced it as three syllables (/ˈfænjuwəl/ FAN-u-el; similar to "Fan-you'll"). The New York Times wrote in 1923 that "Wendell Phillips and other Brahmins called it Funel Hall. The uninitiated favor Fannel Hall. The first would seem to be right."

Faneuil Hall is distinct from the Faneuil Hall Marketplace, which covers not only Faneuil Hall but also the three Quincy Market buildings. The term "Faneuil Hall" is sometimes used to refer to the Quincy Market buildings; the original building is not always included in this categorization. As such, some visitors have associated the name "Faneuil Hall" exclusively with the other three buildings. Over the years, both Faneuil Hall's market and Quincy Market have been referred to as "Faneuil Hall Market". To distinguish from Quincy Market, the name "New Faneuil Hall Market" was used for the original Faneuil Hall's market when it reopened in the 1850s. The original Faneuil Hall has also been called the "New Faneuil Hall" and nicknamed "the Cradle of Liberty".

Although the Faneuil family had sided with the Loyalists during the American Revolutionary War, the name was not changed at that time. In August 2017, amid heightened media coverage of the removal of Confederate monuments and memorials, the activist group New Democracy Coalition proposed that Faneuil Hall's name be changed because of Faneuil's participation in the American slave trade. The next year, activists suggested naming the building for Boston Massacre victim Crispus Attucks, but Mayor Marty Walsh opposed a renaming. Additional name change protests followed in the 2020s, which involved activists chaining themselves to the front door and a sit-in. Although the City Council voted in 2023 to endorse a potential renaming, The Economist wrote that, because Faneuil Hall was a significant site in the American independence and abolitionist movements, there was not as clear a case to rename it, compared with Confederate namesakes.

== Usage and operation ==
Faneuil Hall is owned by the Boston government, which also owns the Quincy, North, and South Market buildings immediately to the east. All four structures are part of the Faneuil Hall Marketplace, of which only Faneuil Hall is also operated by the city. The original Faneuil Hall is part of the Boston National Historical Park, and there is a visitor center for the national park within the building. The NPS operates the visitor center, except for a gift shop, which is privately operated. The first floor is used as a market, and the second floor still hosts meetings and other events. Rooms in Faneuil Hall are rented out to local groups and nonprofit organizations. The Great Hall hosts free talks by NPS rangers every half hour during the daytime. It also regularly hosts naturalization ceremonies for new U.S. citizens, which are open to the general public. The Ancient and Honorable Artillery Company of Massachusetts' headquarters displays artifacts such as bricks, medals, and weapons. The Ancients' headquarters, which also includes a library, was described in the 1970s as the country's oldest continuously-used military armory and museum space.

=== Events ===
Over the years, Faneuil Hall has been used for a wide variety of events, such as debates, speeches, campaign events, jury trials, celebrations, commemorations, receptions, and balls. Topics such as slavery, suffrage, labor unions, and international relations have been discussed there. One newspaper wrote in 1923 that "practically every distinguished American has spoken there", while another said in 1964 that "every issue of great importance has been debated" in the building's halls. Faneuil Hall did not grant absolute free speech; for example, several speeches were forcibly ended early in the 19th century. Some events have been denied permission to use Faneuil Hall, including an 1851 speech by Daniel Webster and a 1929 meeting commemorating the execution of anarchist duo Sacco and Vanzetti.

The Great Hall has traditionally hosted speeches from orators on Independence Day, July 4. From 1783 to 1809, the Boston Massacre was also commemorated there every March 5. The Ford Hall Forum also took place at the building until the 1980s, and Faneuil Hall hosted the Gay and Lesbian Town Meeting from 1977 to c. 1996. Boston's mayor ordinarily gives their annual State of the City address at the Great Hall. Other events over the years have included:

Events at Faneuil Hall
Date	Event type	Description
March 14, 1743	Commemoration	The building's first oration, a eulogy for Peter Faneuil, takes place. This is recorded as America's first recorded town meeting.
October 10, 1744	Celebration	One of the first celebrations at Faneuil Hall takes place.
August 27, 1765	Protest	Protest against Stamp Act 1765 takes place at Faneuil Hall.
October 28, 1767	Meeting	Petition to boycott imported goods is signed at Faneuil Hall.
March 1770	Commemoration	Bodies of Boston Massacre victims Crispus Attucks and James Caldwell lie in state at Faneuil Hall.
1770	Trial	Trial of officers involved in the Boston Massacre takes place at Faneuil Hall.
1773	Protest	Boston Tea Party: Meeting at Faneuil Hall about tea from British ships turns into a protest.
September 5, 1812	Celebration	The expanded Faneuil Hall holds its first major banquet.
August 2, 1826	Commemoration	Daniel Webster eulogizes John Adams and Thomas Jefferson at Faneuil Hall.
July 11, 1831	Speech	Timothy Fuller speaks "at the request of the Suffolk Anti-Masonic Committee" at Faneuil Hall.
September 6, 1834	Commemoration	Edward Everett eulogizes Lafayette at Faneuil Hall.
1837	Speech	Wendell Phillips, speaking at Faneuil Hall, gives his first speech in favor of abolition.
1839	Campaign	Peleg Sprague stumps for candidate William Henry Harrison at Faneuil Hall.
July 4, 1843	Speech	Charles Francis Adams Sr. speaks at Faneuil Hall.
April 15, 1848	Commemoration	Edward Everett eulogizes John Quincy Adams at Faneuil Hall.
October 1850	Meeting	Abolitionists meet at Faneuil Hall, forming the Committee of Vigilance and Safety.
1852	Speech	Hungarian statesman Lajos Kossuth gives a series of speeches at Faneuil Hall, advocating for liberty.
May 26, 1854	Meeting	After arrest of Anthony Burns, a public meeting is held at Faneuil Hall "to secure justice for a man claimed as a slave by a Virginia kidnapper, and imprisoned in Boston Court House, in defiance of the laws of Massachusetts."
April 18, 1863	Speech	Texas politician Andrew Jackson Hamilton speaks "at the war meeting" at Faneuil Hall.
January 9, 1865	Speech	Edward Everett speaks on "the relief of the suffering people of Savannah" at Faneuil Hall.
December 15, 1873	Meeting	The New England Woman Suffrage Association marks the Boston Tea Party's centennial at Faneuil Hall.
June 7, 1876	Meeting	Meeting "in favor of public parks" at Faneuil Hall; Oliver Wendell Holmes Sr. and others speak.
August 1, 1878	Meeting	"Indignation meeting ... to protest against the injury done to the freedom of the press by the conviction and imprisonment of Ezra H. Heywood" at Faneuil Hall.
October 29, 1887	Speech	Eben Norton Horsford speaks at Faneuil Hall on occasion of the unveiling of Anne Whitney's Leif Ericson statue (installed on Commonwealth Ave.).
August 1890	Speech	Julius Caesar Chappelle, Republican legislator of Boston (1883–1886) and one of the first black legislators in the United States, makes a speech in support of the Lodge Bill that would help give Black people the right to vote.
June 15, 1898	Founding	The American Anti-Imperialist League was founded at Faneuil Hall.
March 4, 1903	Speech	Frederic J. Stimson debates James F. Carey at Faneuil Hall.
March 19, 1903	Protest	Protest "against the suppression of truth about the Philippines" takes place at Faneuil Hall.
February 7, 1910	Inauguration	John F. Fitzgerald is inaugurated as Mayor of Boston at Faneuil Hall, marking the first mayoral inauguration there since Boston became a city.
March 5, 1912	Meeting	The Woman Suffrage Party holds a convention at Faneuil Hall.
January 14, 1917	Speech	Irish suffragette Hanna Sheehy-Skeffington gives a speech to 5,000 people at Faneuil Hall.
October 1937	Ceremony	American Legion officers are appointed at Faneuil Hall for the first time.
November 29, 1937	Meeting	The modern Boston City Council has its first-ever meeting at Faneuil Hall.
January 1, 1968	Inauguration	Kevin Hagan White is the first Boston mayor in 50 years (following Andrew J. Peters in 1917) to be inaugurated at Faneuil Hall.
November 7, 1979	Speech	Senator Edward M. Kennedy declares his candidacy for president at Faneuil Hall.
November 3, 2004	Speech	Senator John Kerry concedes the 2004 presidential election at Faneuil Hall.
April 11, 2006	Legislation	Governor Mitt Romney signs Massachusetts' health care bill into law at Faneuil Hall.
October 30, 2013	Speech	President Barack Obama delivers a defense of the Affordable Care Act at Faneuil Hall.
November 2, 2014	Commemoration	Boston Mayor Thomas Menino lay in state in Faneuil Hall following his death.
June 8, 2026	Commemoration	A memorial service for former Democratic Massachusetts congressman Barney Frank is hosted at Faneuil Hall.

== Impact and legacy ==
=== Reception ===
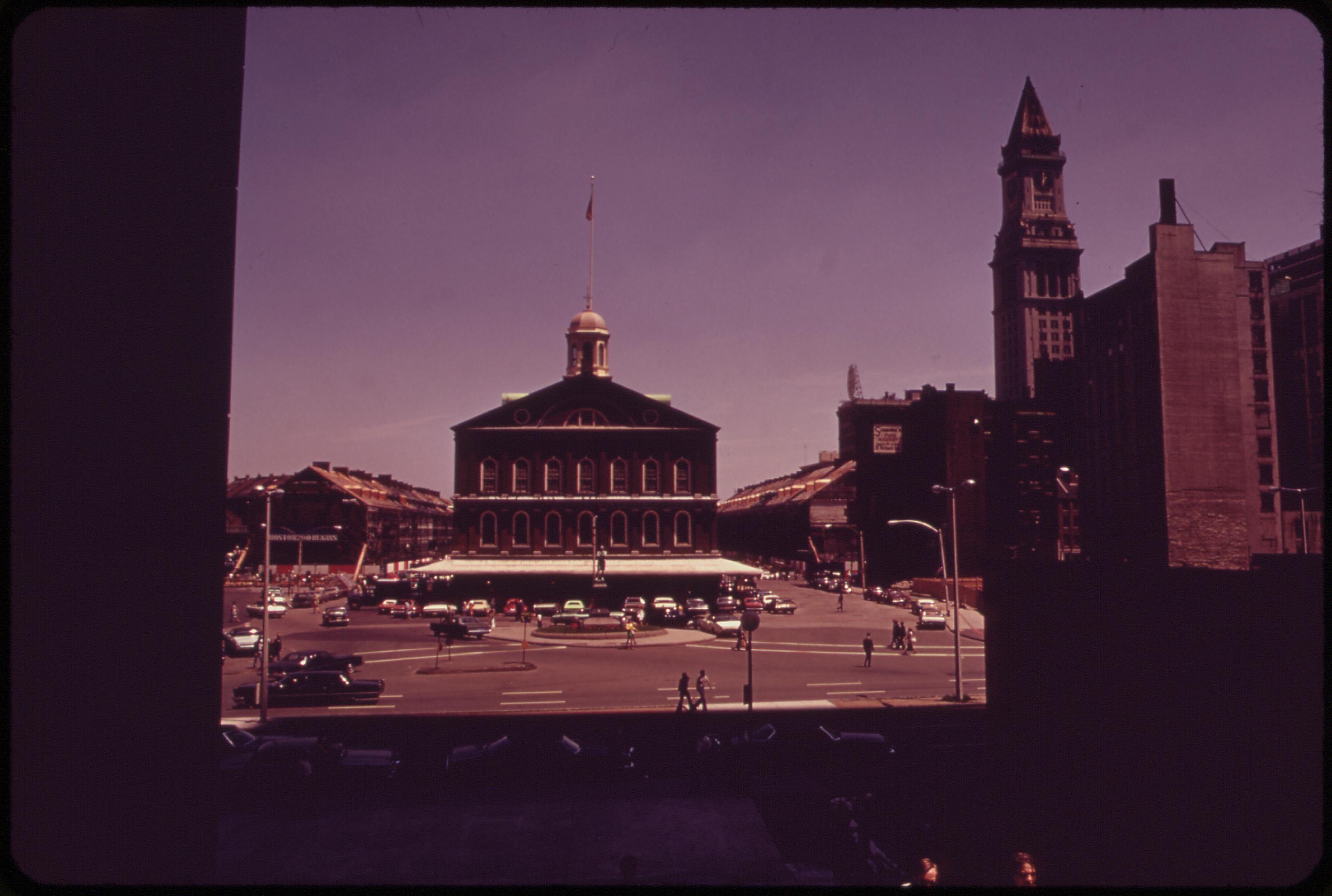
Faneuil Hall seen in 1973 from across Congress Street

The Great Hall has been praised over the years for its symbolism, even while the first-floor marketplace was criticized or ignored. A writer in 1826 said that "there is no place more distinguished for powerful eloquence than Faneuil Hall", while a writer in 1881 said that "nothing which has profoundly agitated Boston for more than a hundred years has found the old hall silent". The New York Times wrote in 1923 that "Faneuil Hall is dear to the Boston heart" and that the building had become synonymous with lively debate. The Springfield Union called the building's relics "of inestimable value in perpetuating the local color and traditions" of Boston, and a writer for the Christian Science Monitor said Faneuil Hall had served as "a forum for concerned Bostonians and their leaders" from the outset. During the United States Semiquincentennial, Smithsonian magazine wrote that the structure was "a symbol for the tradition of public debate itself".

The building itself was also the subject of commentary. In his 1900 history of the building, Abram English Brown wrote that the building was "conspicuous for its simplicity, and disappointing to tourists", although he felt that the enclosure of the first-floor arcade detracted from the overall design. The Boston Globe said in 1964 that Faneuil Hall and the adjoining market buildings formed "one of the finest urban spaces in America". In 1977, the Christian Science Monitor wrote that Faneuil Hall's "multi-tiered, humanly tiered character" allowed visitors to get actual food at ground level and "food for thought" on the second story. A writer for Change Over Time said in 2012 that Faneuil Hall and the other market buildings were "an important contribution to the canon of great American architecture".

A commentator for The Youth's Companion in 1910 described Faneuil Hall as one of three old buildings that Bostonians were most proud of, aside from the Old South Meeting House and Old State House. Faneuil Hall was rated number 4 in "America's 25 Most Visited Tourist Sites" by Forbes Traveler in 2008. Along with Quincy Market, Faneuil Hall was described in The Republican as a tourist trap, and online reviews often complained of overcrowding.

=== Landmark designations ===
The building was designated a National Historic Landmark on October 9, 1960; the landmark report cited Faneuil Hall's architectural, political/government, and social/humanitarian significance. It was added to the National Register of Historic Places on October 15, 1966, the day the National Historic Preservation Act of 1966 went into effect. Faneuil Hall is one of eight sites in the 43-acre (17 ha) Boston National Historical Park, which was designated in 1974. In 1994, the Boston Landmarks Commission designated the building's exterior and some interior spaces as Boston Landmarks.

== See also ==
- List of National Historic Landmarks in Boston
- National Register of Historic Places listings in northern Boston, Massachusetts
- Market House (Fayetteville, North Carolina), a functionally similar National Historic Landmark
- City Market (Charleston, South Carolina), a functionally similar National Historic Landmark

Preceded by Site of the Boston Massacre	Locations along Boston's Freedom Trail; Faneuil Hall	Succeeded by Paul Revere House
