= Ancient Fishweir Project =

American group

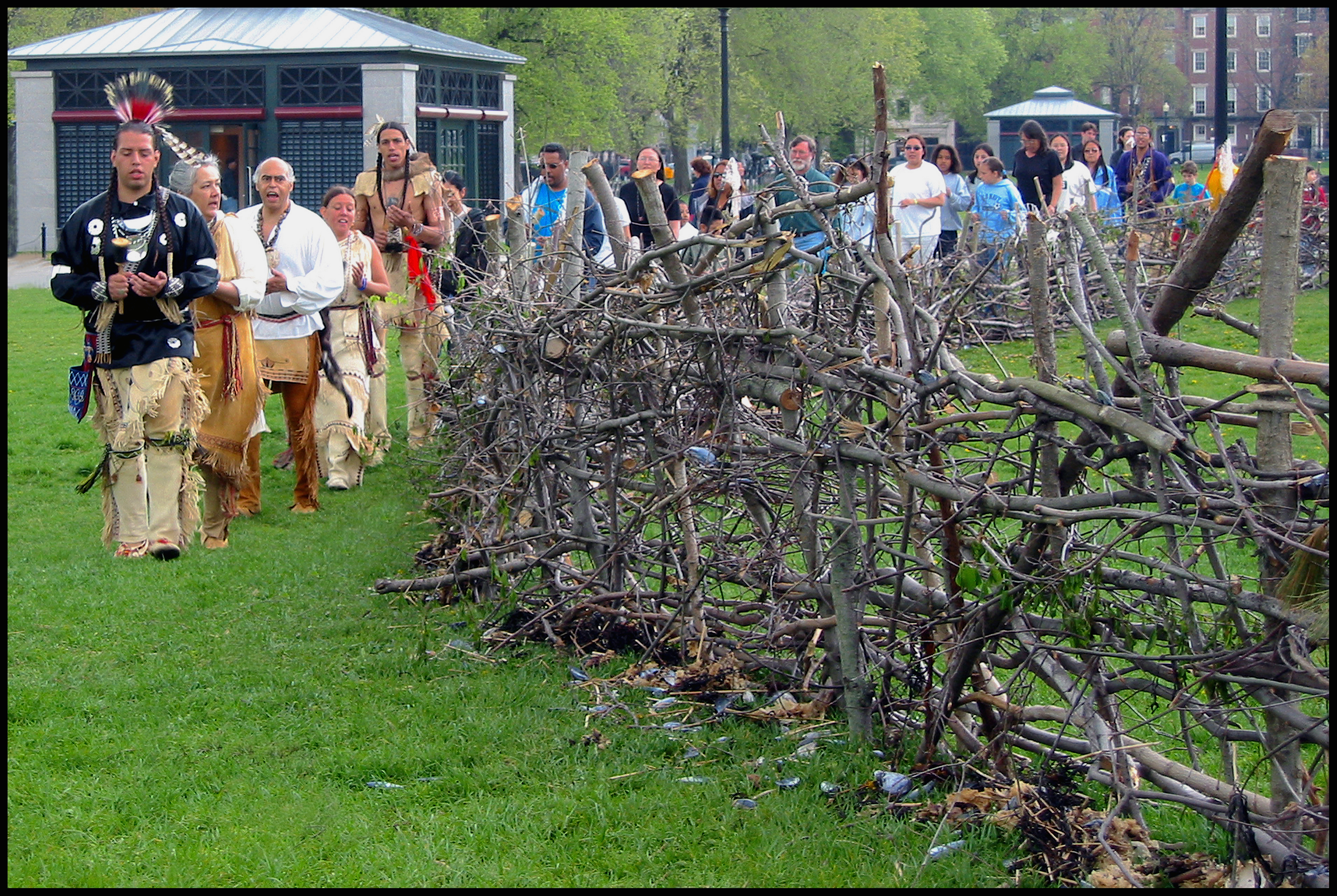
- Annual Fishweir Dedication Celebration
- Location: Boston Common, Boston, Massachusetts
- Status: history and public art
- Public transit: Park Street (MBTA station)

Ancient Fishweir Project is a collaborative group that creates an annual public art installation on Boston Common.

== Description ==
In the spring of each year, members of the Massachusett and Wampanoag Native American tribes work with students, educators and artists to construct a fish-weir in honor of the people who built fishweirs 3500 to 5200 years BP (Before Present) in the area that is now urban Boston. Today this fishweir re-creation is located on dry land near what was once an early shoreline that existed when ocean levels were lower and before new land was made by fill of the Back Bay tidal estuary that began in the Colonial period.

The fishweir construction is based on archeological discovery of wooden stakes from fishweirs, including the Boylston Street Fishweir, that are still buried under the streets of the Back Bay, Boston. The early fishweirs, fence-like structures of wood and brush, were built in tidal flats to catch alewife, smelt, and herring during the spring spawn.

The time of the spring fish spawn, and the beginning of new growing season, is traditionally considered the New Year for Wampanoag and Massachuset people. In traditional culture it is said that the fish return to spawn in the streams when “the oak leaf is as big as a mouse’s ear”.

Initiators of the Ancient Fishweir Project include Gill Solomon, Sachem of the Massachuset Tribe; Ross Miller; Dena Dincauze, archeologist; Ellen Berkland, Archeologist for the City of Boston; and Annawon Weedon and Jim Peters of the Wampanoag Tribe.

Annual building of the fishweir on Boston Common, the oldest public common in the country (1634), challenges assumptions of the history that is currently taught. Construction of the fishweir is supported by educational programs and teacher workshops in collaboration with Boston Children's Museum. Lectures and on-site music and dance performance events provide interpretation of the history for students and the public.

== See also ==
- Boston Children's Museum
- Indigenous People's Day
- Massachusett
