= Boylston Street Fishweir =

Ancient fishing structures in Boston

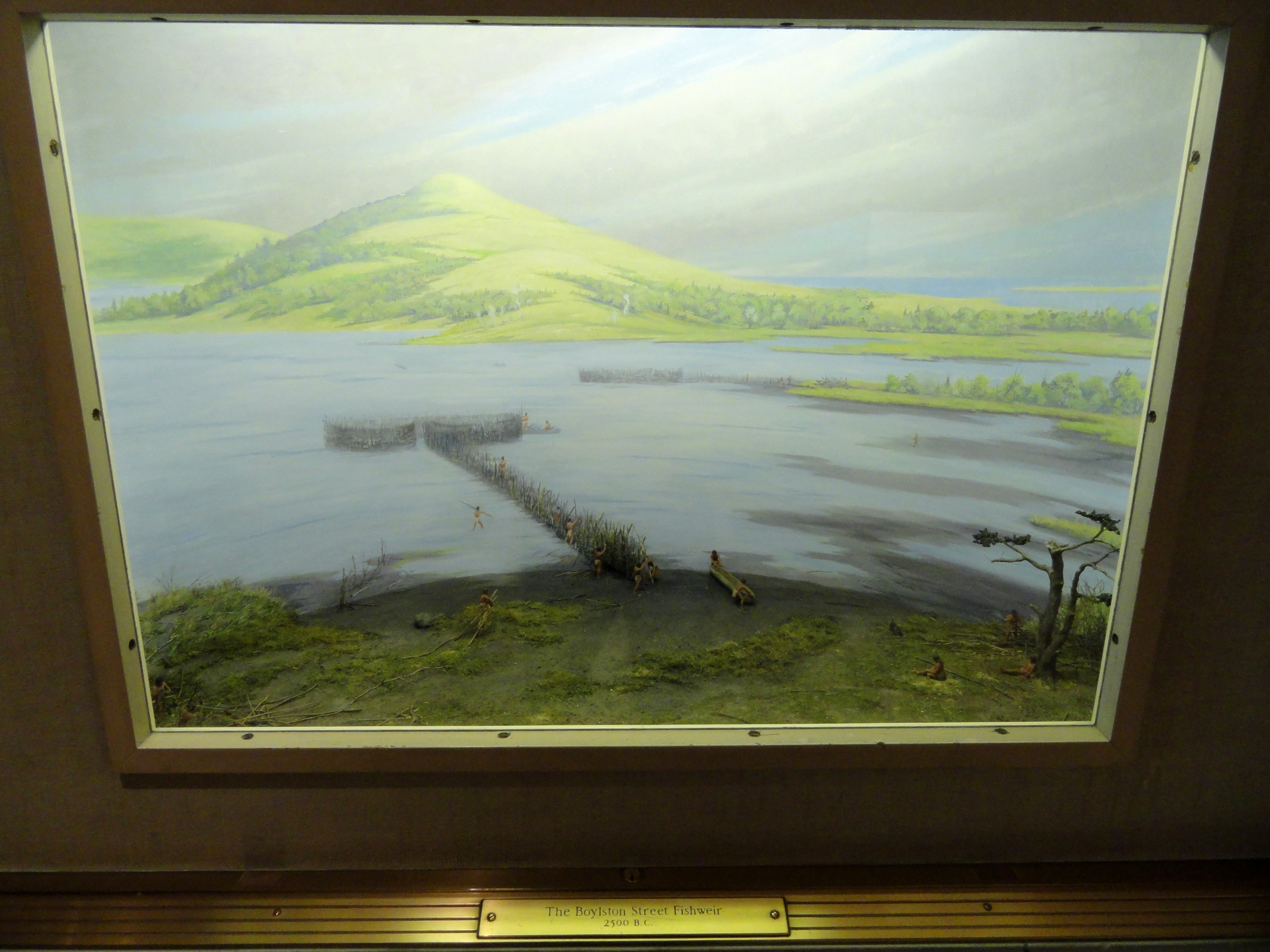
Diorama depicting the fishweir, c.2500 BCE

In archeological literature, the Boylston Street Fishweir comprises a set of ancient fishing structures first discovered in 1913, buried 29 to 40 feet (8.8 to 12.2 m) below Boylston Street in Boston, Massachusetts. Reports written in 1942 and 1949 describe what was thought to be remains of one large fishweir, 2,500 years old, made of up to 65,000 wooden stakes distributed over an estimated 2 hectares (4.9 acres) of the former mud flat and marshland in what is now the Back Bay section of Boston. A different interpretation of these findings is offered by new evidence and contemporary archeological research techniques.

== Fish weir description and use ==
Throughout the world, fish weirs, wooden fence-like structures built to catch fish, are used in tidal and river conditions as a passive method to trap fish during the cycle from low to high tide, or in river flow. Fish weirs built in places of large tidal change, 12 to 20 feet (3.7 to 6.1 m) between ebb and flow, are built with 4-to-6-inch-diameter (10 to 15 cm) vertical support poles holding woven nets. Fish weirs in shallow estuaries water, or in small streams, may be built with 1-to-3-inch-diameter (2.5 to 7.6 cm) vertical stakes and the horizontal structure, called wattling, made of brushwork to form a rough barrier at mid-tide depth.

Fish weirs have been used in coastal areas by indigenous peoples in all parts of the world. Fish weirs have been discovered dating back to 7,500 years BP. In some locations, such as in Yap, Federated States of Micronesia, fish weirs are still built and used today. Along the coast of developed areas of North America and Europe permits are now required to build a fish weir. Depending on fish populations in an area, and local maritime use, fish weir construction may be prohibited entirely. This has been an issue of concern to Native American tribal groups along the New England coast.

== History of discovery in Boston ==
In 1913, subway workers tunneling under Boylston Street to extend Boston’s early subway system discovered wooden stakes in the blue-gray glacial clay, 32 feet (9.8 m) below street level. Workers destroyed many of the stakes, but enough evidence was gathered at the time that researchers thought they had found one large fish weir, thought to have been built 2,000 years earlier. This discovery was first described in a report by the Boston Transit Commission in June 1913.

Fish weir discovery continued in 1939, with archeological investigations led by Frederick Johnson during foundation excavation for the New England Mutual Life Building at 501 Boylston Street. Long sequences of wooden stakes, buried under tidal silt and an additional 15 to 20 feet (4.6 to 6.1 m) of 19th-century Back Bay fill, were found passing through the site and continuing on under surrounding streets. Maps were drawn that described a fish weir covering more than 2 acres (8,100 m^{2}) of the former marshland below Boston's Back Bay – suggesting the existence of one very large fish weir with over 65,000 wooden stakes. The imagined scale of this fish weir led scholars to speculate that it was built at one time by a community of appreciable size. This fish weir was described as the earliest known large-scale engineering effort in North America. Drawings and models were made based on the findings and show the fish weir built in deep water, maintained by men working from mishoons (log canoes). This interpretation may have been informed by the type of fish weirs known to be still in use in the 1940s by Native peoples in the Canadian Bay of Fundy.

Archeological research continued in 1946 during the construction of the John Hancock Building. At this site, 2-inch-diameter (5.1 cm) vertical wood stakes, 3 to 4 feet (91 to 122 cm) long, were found in parallel linear orientations. Researchers thought they were seeing remains of long wooden structures built across streams on ancient tidal flats. This evidence suggested weirs built to trap seasonal spawning fish in shallow water tidal areas. Harvesting of fish was now thought to have been done by hand, by wading out from shore, or waiting until low tide to collect the stranded fish.

== A new interpretation ==
New research started in 1985 during excavations for the construction of a building at 500 Boylston Street suggest a different understanding of the previous fish weir evidence. Radiocarbon dating, refined pollen sample analysis, and accurate surveys allowed the fish weir stakes to be understood to straddle many different stratigraphic layers. Rather than one large weir built at one moment in history, this new evidence suggests that fish weir remains discovered in this and previous excavations were parts of many smaller weirs, built in different locations, over a 1,500-year time span. Lead archeologist Dena Dincauze describes the fish weirs being short 100-to-150-foot-long (30 to 46 m) structures designed to harvest herring and other small fish that spawn in the late spring in the gentle waters of the intertidal zone. These weirs were most likely built and used by family clans of 35 to 50 people, who each spring would migrate from inland hunting camps to the coast, following the best seasonal food resources. The harvested fish were used for both food and to nourish the soil prior to planting.

== Climate change in Boston area ==
Research on climate change and evidence from study of fish weirs and sediments under the Back Bay indicate the ocean level in the Boston area has risen more than ten feet in the last 6,000 years. Wooden stakes uncovered during the 500 Boylston Street excavation show the fish weirs were located close to the changing shoreline edge. These weirs were rebuilt seasonally at increasingly higher locations, as the ocean level continued to rise. Dendrochronological research documents that the wood species used for these weirs—sassafras, hickory, dogwood, beech, oak and alder—changed with the climate fluctuation. Analysis of tree rings and bark of recovered fishweir stakes reveals that the wood was often cut in the late winter and construction work on the weirs undertaken in the spring.

During the time during which the fish weirs were in use the difference between high and low tide was only about 3 feet (0.91 m), allowing easy construction and maintenance of the wooden structures, and direct access to the trapped fish by walking from the shore. The most accurate radiocarbon dating of these weirs suggests that the earliest were built almost 5200 years BP, and then rebuilt time and again, essentially maintained for over 1500 years. By about 3700 years before present, the daily tidal height change and water flow had increased, and the ocean level had risen to the point that tidal weirs made of small size wood stakes were no longer effective in the Back Bay location. The Native people remained, developing other fishing and planting methods. The descendants of these early people may be members of the Massachusett tribe today.

== Future research ==
New building construction in Boston’s Back Bay will most likely uncover more fish weir evidence. Collected samples of weir stakes, and survey information exists from archeological work in 1985 and from earlier efforts. More research is needed to assemble a complete and comprehensive study of the fish weir history and to more fully understand the life of the early people who lived for thousands of years in the place we now call Boston. The Ancient Fishweir Project, an annual public event on Boston Common, honors the early history with the construction of a fishweir within two blocks of the still-buried fishweir remains.

== See also ==
- Arlington (MBTA station)#Artwork
