= Ross Miller (artist) =

American artist

- Known for: installation, sculpture, writing, education
- Website: www.rossmiller.com

Ross Miller is an American visual artist. His work integrates art into the public landscape. Through site-based projects, his work reinforces community identity in outdoor spaces and creates places for private reflection within public environments.

== Beginnings ==
Miller was born in Cambridge, England. His father is a glaciologist who studies long term climate change and mother was a musician. Miller earned his undergraduate degree in Visual and Environmental Studies at Harvard University. Mentors during his studies were poet Emmett Williams, industrial designer Eva Zeisel, and conceptual artist Douglas Huebler.

== Work ==
Concern about the lack of meaning in non-site-specific public art practices and the limitations and selective private nature of studio based art led Miller to work in the public realm. Rather than imposing a specific medium or content on a site, his ideas evolve by examining the site's ecological and social history, patterns of pedestrian activity, quality of light, and proposed future uses in order to create public artwork that makes direct connection with the site, heightening one's experience of being in that specific place. Sited in publicly accessible locations - urban squares and parks, in schools, subway tunnels, along highways and over city streets - these projects evolve through collaboration with local residents, school and community groups, planners, architects, landscape architects and other artists. The projects range from urban and architectural scale installations to intimate pedestrian scale sculptures.

One example, the Ancient Fishweir Project, is based on history of fishweirs used over 5,300 years ago in the place that is now called Boston. In what is now Boston's Back Bay, native people built fishweirs in tidal flats to catch alewife, smelt and salmon. The 4-foot-high (1.2 m), fence-like structures were woven of alder, willow saplings and brush wattling and were made of over 65,000 wood stakes. Miller developed an annual public art installation project on the Boston Common to bring attention to this overlooked piece of history. The annual event brings together Boston Public School children with local artists, archeologists, educators and Native Americans to recreate a replica of an ancient fishweir on the Charles Street side of the Boston Common.

Other projects include: Original Shoreline public artwork created by etching Boston's former harbor edge (c. 1630) into granite between Faneuil Hall and City Hall; Salt Marsh Trace fountain and historical sculptures, at University Park at MIT research park in Cambridge, MA; and an educational miniature golf course for the Boston Children's Museum.

Lighting work, more decorative in nature, has been developed by Miller from an original system developed from steel cable, net and commercial electric fixtures. These light installations contribute to urban experience in the dark cold times - at night and in the winter. At night, the artworks appear to float. The lights are wired to nets suspended from buildings or poles. Hanging 40–50 feet over the street, these pieces create gateways over the street, adding to celebration of downtown urban areas. This lighting system has been used in over 75 installations in 9 cities in the East Coast of the United States.

Early design work includes patents for education toys and collapsible furniture.

== Site base work ==
Permanent public art installations include an interactive water fountain Falls Fountain in Festival Plaza, Auburn, Maine; LIttoral Way, a 0.5-mile (0.80 km) pedestrian walkway for the Central Artery Tunnel Project; and a permanent installation called Harbor Fog, a motion sensor–activated fog, LED light and granite sculptural environment for the Rose Kennedy Greenway created as part of Boston's Big Dig highway project. Utilizing high pressure fog, an artwork called Calliope, is an immersive artwork for Carroll Plaza, Worcester, Massachusetts. User motion initiates an enveloping fog, sequenced RGBW LED lights, and a sound system to engage viewers in an atmospheric experience inspired by the Steam Calliope invented and patented in Worcester, Massachusetts in 1855.

He is a designer for the Outdoor Classroom Pilot Projects, a series of experiential educational garden landscapes for Boston Public Schools and the Boston Schoolyard Initiative.
