= Yahoo Time Capsule =

Digital time capsule with contributions about life in 2006

Yahoo! Time Capsule

- Screenshot of Yahoo! Time Capsule shows the count down before the reopening.
- Website type: Time capsule
- Available in: Multilingual
- Owner: Yahoo!
- Creator: Jonathan Harris
- Website: timecapsule.yahoo.com
- Commercial: No
- Registration: Yes
- Launched: October 10, 2006
- Current status: N/A

The Yahoo! Time Capsule, a brainchild of Jonathan Harris, is a time capsule project by Yahoo! Inc. where users could contribute to a "digital legacy" of how life was in 2006. The Time Capsule was originally intended to be beamed with a laser into space from a Mexican pyramid in an attempt to communicate with extraterrestrial life. Open to contributions from October 10, 2006 to November 8, 2006, the Time Capsule also hoped to capture the thoughts and feelings of the world in 2006 as an exercise in electronic or "digital anthropology". At the time of the closing of the capsule, the total number of submissions was 170,857. The highest number of contributions (32,910) came from the 20–29 age group.

Although originally slated to be produced at the Pyramid of the Sun in Teotihuacan, Mexico, Mexican authorities denied Yahoo! permission fearing damage to the ancient historical site. Instead, the 2006 Yahoo! Time Capsule culminated in a celebrated production on the Jemez Pueblo in New Mexico. The 18-hour live event spanned the evenings of October 25, 26, and 27th, and featured the projection of giant digital images of Time Capsule submissions onto an ancient red rock cliff on the reservation. Each night opened with traditional dancing and music by the people of Jemez Pueblo, set in front of the immense projections and lighting that could be seen for miles through the desert. Recordings of international folk music provided by Smithsonian Folkways Recordings accompanied the live global webcast. The Time Capsule event was designed and produced by environmental media artist Marc Herring, of Herring Media Group, Inc., and featured the projection and display engineering services of Quince Imaging, Inc.

The Time Capsule closed on November 8, 2006, after which the digital collection of submissions was entrusted to Smithsonian Folkways Recordings based in Washington D.C., where it remained until Yahoo!'s 25th birthday in 2020. It is thought that the capsule represents one of the largest compilations of digital media of its kind in the world.

In addition to being able to contribute text, audio, images, and videos, visitors could browse previously included entries, comment on them, or forward them. In return for submitting content to the Time Capsule, Yahoo! asked users to vote for one among a list of seven charities which received a portion of $100,000 from Yahoo! based upon the ratio of votes received by contributors. The charities were the World Wildlife Fund, the International Rescue Committee, the Grameen Foundation, UNICEF, One.org, Seeds of Peace, and the International Child Art Foundation.

In February 2020, media commentators suggested that following Yahoo! Inc's decline as a company since 2006, there was some prospect that the Time Capsule would not actually be reopened in March 2020.

On March 2, 2020, during an all company meeting, The Time Capsule was reopened.

== See also ==
- Crypt of Civilization
- Westinghouse Time Capsules
- International Time Capsule Society
