= List of time capsules =

This is a list of time capsules. The register of The International Time Capsule Society estimates there are between 10,000 and 15,000 time capsules worldwide. An estimated 95% of time capsules are lost track of by the fifth anniversary of their burial.

An active list of time capsules is maintained by the NotForgotten Digital Preservation Library.

== Asia ==
=== India ===
- Indian Prime Minister Indira Gandhi had buried a time capsule outside one of the gate of Red Fort complex, The Indira Gandhi government named this time capsule "Kalpaatra", Delhi containing post-independence history of India on 15 August 1972 amid political opposition. It was scheduled to be opened after 1000 years. The next Janata government unearthed it in 1977 but its contents were never made public and were lost.
- A time capsule was buried in the presence of the President of India near the auditorium of IIT Kanpur on 6 March 2010.
- Mahatma Mandir, Gandhinagar containing the history of Indian state of Gujarat marking the 50 years of its foundation. Installed in 2010.
- Alexandra Girls' English Institution, a school in Fort, South Mumbai buried a time capsule in 2014, scheduling it to be opened on 1 September 2062, on the bi-centennial anniversary of the school.
- Under the flag holding of Prime Minister Narendra Modi, a time-capsule was buried in the premises of Lovely Professional University, a University located in Jalandhar, Punjab on the second day of Indian National Congress dated 4 January 2019. The occasion was attended by Nobel laureates, including biochemist Avram Hershko and physicist Duncan Haldane. They lowered a 8x8 time capsule-box made of aluminium and wood with a glass door. 10 feet into the ground. A smart phone, landline telephone, VCR, stereo player, stop watch, computer parts like hard disk, mouse, laptop, central processing unit, a motherboard, hard disk with the latest documentaries and movies, a camera, science-text books and scientific equipment like rheostat, refrectorscope and double microscope are some of the things that will remain buried for 100 years. The area where the capsule has been buried would be cemented and earmarked.
- On 26 January 2021, a 1.5 tonne time capsule encapsulating the history of Aligarh Muslim University (AMU) history spanning over a century was buried 30 feet deep in the park opposite Victoria Gate during Republic Day celebrations to mark the university's eventful centenary year on Tuesday.

=== Indonesia ===
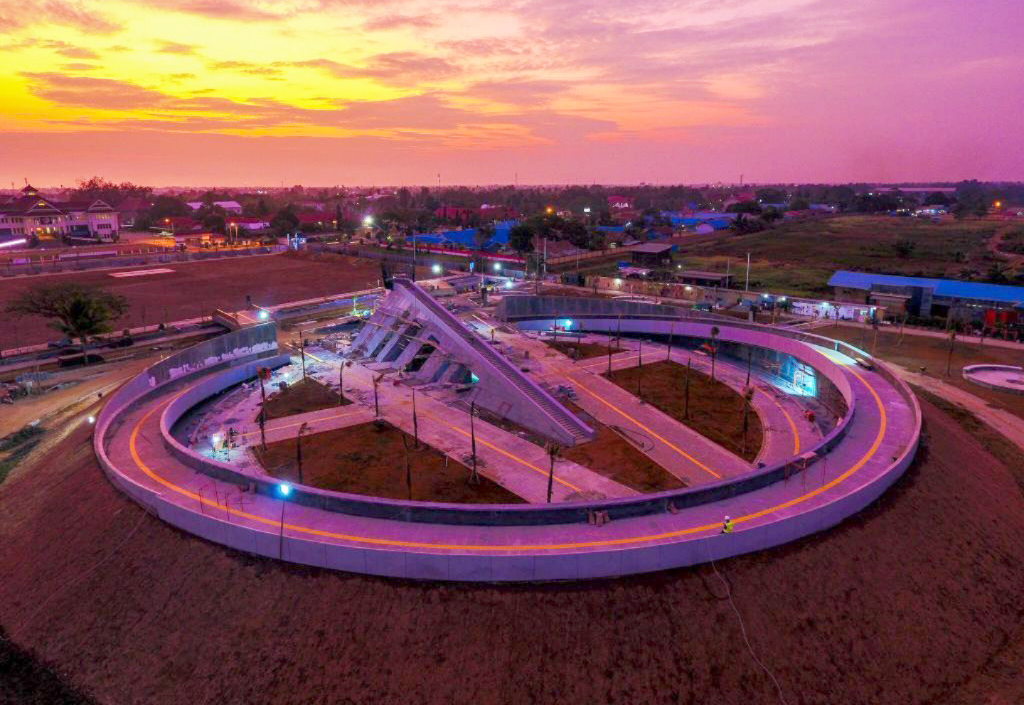
Merauke Time Capsule Monument in South Papua, Indonesia

- On 1 June 1976, as the construction of Hayam Wuruk Building (Wisma Hayam Wuruk) in Central Jakarta, Jakarta finished, a time capsule was buried in the building's structure. The capsule contains polaroid pictures of the capsule burying ceremony, some coins, and daily newspapers in Jakarta published on that date. The opening date, however, remains unknown.
- At the start of the construction of the Matahari Tower in Lippo Karawaci, Tangerang Regency, Banten in 1994, a time capsule was embedded. It is not known where it was located, what was in it and when it will be opened.
- To commemorate 70th anniversary of Indonesian independence, a time capsule was buried in a square of Merauke town, Merauke Regency, South Papua in 2015, near Mopah International Airport. Inside the capsule are "the dreams and hopes" of Indonesian children for the next 70 years, planned to be opened in 2085. Merauke Time Capsule Monument is built upon the buried capsule, it was inaugurated on 16 November 2018.

=== Japan ===
- The Expo '70 time capsule is located near Osaka Castle, donated by Panasonic and the Mainichi Newspapers. It was opened for the first time in 2000, and then the second time expected to be opened in 2100. The time capsule remains sealed until 6970.

=== Kazakhstan ===
- In Aktau, people of 1967 sent a message showing the chronology of the development of Mangyshlak Peninsula with the names of the people who helped to build the town in the desert. The letter was put in a metallic cylinder in a triangular marble urn. It opened in November 2017.

=== South Korea ===
- During the inaugural Youth Day event in 2020, K-pop group BTS handed a time capsule to president Moon Jae-in to be opened in the year 2039, during the 20th Youth Day event. It is currently stored in the National Museum of Korean Contemporary History. The purple time capsule contains some of the best memories BTS had during their entire career.
- The Seoul Millennium Time Capsule in Namsangol Hanok Village was buried in 1994 to celebrate Seoul's 600th anniversary as the capital of Korea. It contains 600 items chosen to represent the city. The time capsule is set to be opened on 29 November 2394, on the city's 1000th anniversary.

=== Malaysia ===
- Rotary Club Time Capsule Monument (GPS: 3.15912, 101.69825) is a commemorative monument along Jalan Sultan Ismail in Kuala Lumpur. It was originally located at Dataran Merdeka, but was relocated to Jalan Sultan Ismail around 2016. It comprises a stainless steel column topped with a Rotary International logo. At the base is a black marble-encased pedestal under which a time capsule is buried. The monument was erected to celebrate the presence of Rotary in Malaysia since 1929. It was officiated by the mayor of Kuala Lumpur, Tan Sri Dato' Kamaruzzaman bin Shariff, on 26 June 2000.

=== Philippines ===
- The El Hogar Filipino Building in Escolta, Manila contained a time capsule behind a copper plaque and is believed to contain mostly Spanish-language works. It was reportedly removed from the building in 2018.
- Three time capsules were sealed near the town hall of Naguilian, La Union containing memorabilia related to the town's history and culture. These are to be opened after 25, 50, and 100 years.

=== Russia ===
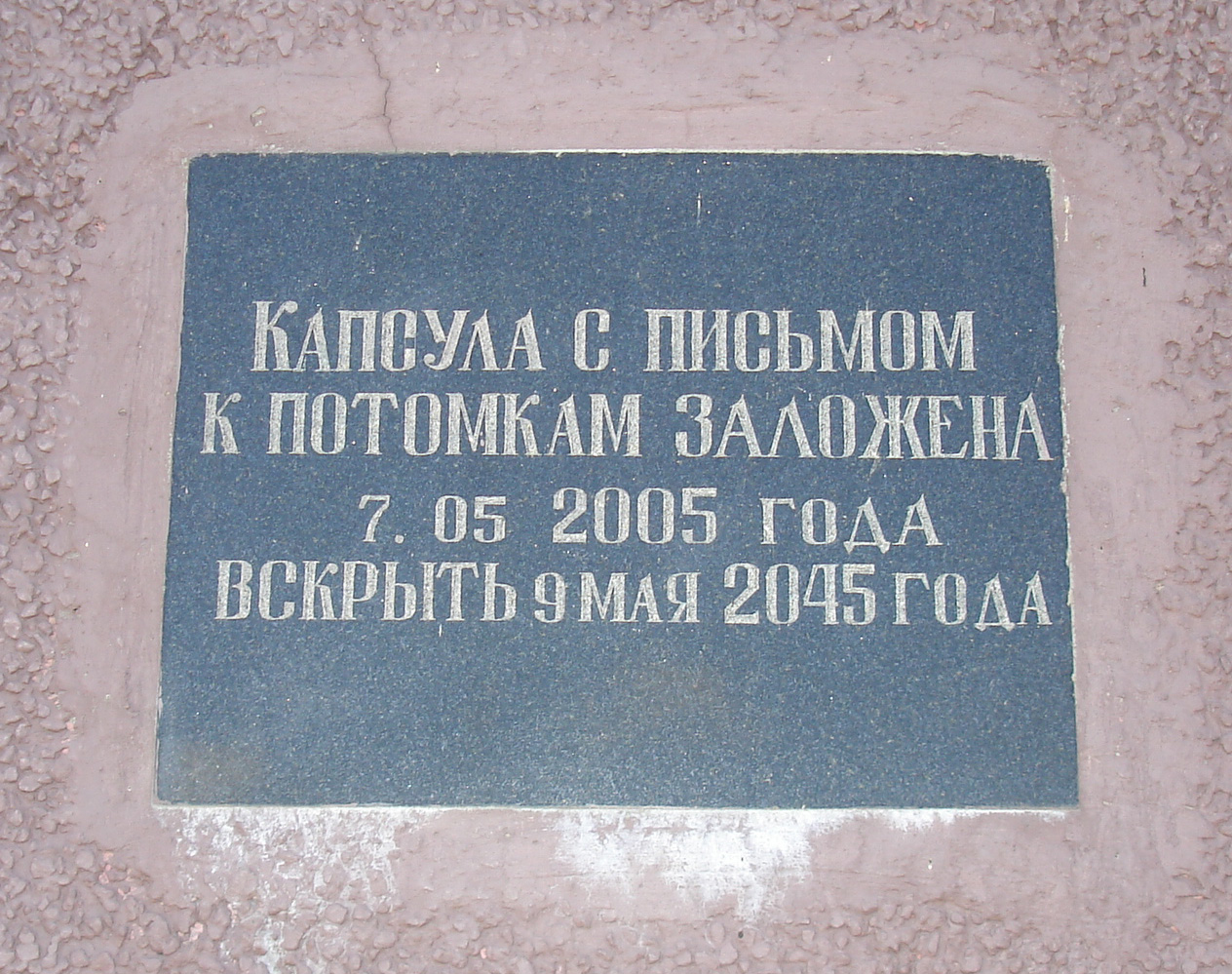
A time capsule at the Kumzhensky memorial in Russia bears the inscription, "A capsule with a letter to descendants is pledged 7 May 2005. To be opened May 2045".

- On 7 May 2005, a time capsule was placed at the Kumzhensky memorial in Russia with an instruction to open on 9 May 2045.
- In 2012, a time capsule dating from 15 July 1979 was found in Vulkanny (Yelizovsky District, Kamchatka peninsula) under a statue of Lenin. It contained messages to the "Soviet Russian master society in 2024".

=== Singapore ===
- The oldest known time capsule in Singapore was rediscovered in early 2016, beneath the foundation stone of the Cathedral of the Good Shepherd. The shoebox-sized time capsule from 18 June 1843 was found to include a prayer booklet and newspapers, and international coins. The capsule is thought to have been buried by French Catholic missionary priests and other founding communities of Singapore.
- On April 1, 1937, a capsule containing coins and newspapers from the time was buried under the foundation stone of the former Supreme Court building with the intention that it be opened in the year 3000. The building now houses the National Gallery Singapore, where the foundation stone can still be seen today.
- In 1949, a capsule was buried at Anglo-Chinese School (Barker Road) containing school magazines, a bible and records of major donors. Thought to be lost, the capsule was rediscovered in 2000 with the help of a former student who had attended the burial ceremony.
- A capsule buried in 1950 under the then Royal Island Club (now the Singapore Island Country Club) was thought to be lost but later found by construction workers in 2010. It contained photographs and newspapers.
- In 1970, one of Singapore's founding leaders, Dr Goh Keng Swee laid a copper cylinder containing newspapers and Singapore bank notes from the era, somewhere in the former National Stadium. Unfortunately the location has been lost and metal detectors have failed to find it despite a $50,000 reward on offer.
- Since 1973, Science Centre Singapore has been depositing gadgets and examples of significant technologies in a time capsule inaugurated by then Science and Technology Minister Dr Toh Chin Chye. The first 112 items deposited included a black and white television receiver, a camera and samples of pig feed. After additional deposits were made in 1983, 2001 and 2013, the original capsule was replaced with a larger stainless steel container that now holds over 800 items in an atmosphere of inert nitrogen gas in the hope that this will better preserve the artefacts inside.
- The Jurong Town Corporation buried a time capsule under Jurong Town Hall in 1974. When opened in 2001, the capsule was found to contain reports, articles and photographs illustrating the industrialisation of Jurong.
- In 1975, part of Singapore's contribution to an International Ocean Exposition held in Okinawa, Japan entitled The Sea We Would Like to See was a research project using floating time capsules. The previous year, 50 small round capsules were released from Raffles Lighthouse as part of a global fleet of 2,800 to measure oceanic tides and currents. Each capsule contained information about the Exposition, a goodwill message from a Japanese child and a voucher for a Citizen Blackie watch to incentivise finders to fill in a post card with details of where the capsule were found. 24 of the capsules released in Singapore were later recovered.
- 1990 saw the unexpected unearthing of a time capsule from the 1950s by contractors working at the demolished American Insurance building in Robinson Road. Buried on 26 April 1956, the copper canister contained English and Chinese newspapers, a financial report, photographs, posters and an insurance agent's manual.
- In 2015, a time capsule buried to celebrate Singapore's 25th year of independence was dug up and replaced with one celebrating 50 years as a sovereign nation. The original canister held 88 "symbols of progress" including a video tape of the 1966 National Day (Singapore), water from the Singapore River and the first sarong kebaya uniforms designed by Pierre Balmain for Singapore Airlines in 1968. The replacement capsule, made from stainless steel, was buried by then Deputy Prime Minister Ong Teng Cheong outside Empress Place.
- On 31 August 2005, Singapore Polytechnic buried a time capsule in order to conclude year-long celebrations of its 50th anniversary of its founding in 1954. Located near its main library, it is scheduled to be re-opened in 2029 for its 75th anniversary. Items in the time capsule included staff and student admission cards, a CD of 2004's graduation ceremony and a bottle of locally brewed red wine.

== Caribbean ==
Install Year	Open Year	Location	Notes	Cite
2012	2062; 36 years' time	Bacardi headquarters, Bermuda	In celebration of its 150th corporate anniversary, Bacardi Limited installed a 1.82m × 0.30m stainless steel time capsule, encased in a granite cap and cement pedestal, in front of the Bacardi worldwide headquarters in Bermuda. The capsule was placed in December 2012 and is intended to be opened in 2062, at the company's 200th anniversary.	

== Europe ==
Install Year	Open Year	Location	Notes	Cite
1891	2018	Palace hotel, Zagreb, Croatia	Message which wishes luck and prosperity to the family of the owner Dragutin Schlesinger. Achievements during the reign of Emperor Franz Joseph and Ban Khuen-Héderváry, price lists of that time, etc. Also the Obzor and Agramer Zeitung newspapers and several coins.	
1894	2015	Kingussie, Scotland	29 September 1894 newspaper; bottle believed to contain whisky.	
1898	2013	Bell tower of the Zagreb Cathedral, Zagreb, Croatia	Message from architect Herman Bollé who ran the 19th century reconstruction of the Zagreb Cathedral. In it he wished: "When it is opened, let the Croats be a unified nation."	
2012		Hallstatt, Austria	Memory of Mankind	
2015	18 Nov 2115	Cognac, France, Louis XIII Cellars	Contents: A film and a bottle of Louis XIII	
2017	2317	Durham County Record Office, Co Durham, England	Contents: An eclectic collection of texts, images and small artefacts. Installed in the archive facility within the Durham County Record Office.	
2024	2024	Flums, Switzerland	The Global Knowledge Vault Contents: English Wikipedia and Rosetta language archives.	

=== France ===
- Normandy American Cemetery and Memorial.
- Strasbourg Cathedral.
- Le Lieu unique.

=== Iceland ===
- Erected in 2014, the monument is located in Reykjavik, Iceland, has of three differently shaped 15 feet tall spires, two made of stone and one metal center pillar.

=== Italy ===
- A ~20-man, White War military barracks on Mount Scorluzzo—which had been locked up at the end of World War I—became partly accessible from the 1990s and completely accessible in 2015 because of melting glaciers. The barracks contained beds made of straw, clothes, lanterns, newspapers, postcards, coins, tinned food and animal bones empty of marrow.

=== Norway ===
- On 17 September 2017 near the Polish Polar Station, Hornsund in the Norwegian Svalbard archipelago, scientific researchers buried a 60-centimeter stainless steel tube containing samples designed to tell finders as long as half a million years into the future, about the current state of knowledge in such areas as geology, biology, and technology.

=== Poland ===
- Prisoners from the Auschwitz concentration camp concealed bottles containing sketches and writings that were found after World War II.
- In 2016, a copper-cylinder time capsule dating to 1934 was found beneath the former Nazi training facility in the Ordensburg Krössinsee building in Złocieniec, Poland. The time capsule, which contained photographs, newspapers, coins, and two copies of Hitler's Mein Kampf, was retrieved by researchers who navigated through thick concrete, German mines, and groundwater.
- In 2024, at the initiative of film director Mateusz Kudła, history enthusiasts from the Polish YouTube channel History Hiking, together with scientists from the AGH University of Krakow, unveiled a time capsule at the abbey containing a long-term experiment inspired by the pitch drop experiment. The installation includes an extremely viscous petroleum-derived bitumen. Once the entire substance flows through, which is estimated to take about 100 years, a key will be revealed to unlock the time capsule. Inside, items such as letters to future generations, books, a smartphone, a bottle of crude oil, and everyday objects—such as a pen, a fountain pen, a credit card, lipstick, a cable tie, and more—have been placed.

=== Spain ===
- An 1834 time capsule was discovered in 2009 under a statue of Miguel de Cervantes in Madrid. It contains a guide and four volumes of the 1819 edition of Don Quixote.
- A time capsule was buried in Motril, Granada. It was opened on 22 July 2023 to celebrate the 150th anniversary of the cantonal movement.
- A 1777 time capsule was discovered within a religious statue in Sotillo de la Ribera (Burgos). It contained two handwritten pages describing details of the political, religious, and economic situation of the region at the time.

=== Switzerland ===
- On 13 January 2024, The Arch Mission Foundation installed the Global Knowledge Vault inside the Hagerbach deep underground tunnel system, near Flums Switzerland, containing the Wikipedia and the Rosetta language archives.

=== United Kingdom ===
- Kingussie, Scotland: in August 2015, workers discovered a metal box containing a newspaper from 29 September 1894, a paper scroll and a bottle believed to contain whisky.
- Newton Aycliffe, County Durham, England: On 21 March 2017, a time capsule bearing the name of its creator, James D Robinson, was 'sealed' at an informal gathering in a local church hall. It was subsequently transferred to the nearby Durham County Record Office, at County Hall, in the City of Durham, where it will reside in their archive facility for the next 300 years. The capsule contains an eclectic mix of texts and images along with a number of artefacts, and is scheduled to be opened on 21 March 2317.
- The children's television show Blue Peter has buried several time capsules during its run. Ones buried in London in 1971 and 1984 were opened in January 2000. A third was then buried to be opened in 2029, and has since been relocated to Salford, Greater Manchester. One was also placed under the Millennium Dome in London in 1998, to be opened in 2050, but was accidentally unearthed and damaged during construction work in 2017. It was reburied once it was repaired.
- Southampton, Hampshire: a 1935 message in a lemonade bottle, correctly portending difficult times lying ahead, was found in 2016 by masons restoring damaged Portland stone at Southampton Guildhall.
- Millennium Vault, Europe's largest time capsule was built in 2000 in Guildford, Surrey. The capsule, which contains lots of mementos, is set to be opened in 3000.
- In 2025, a time capsule was buried at Blackpool Pleasure Beach, in the foundations of its new ride, Aviktas, which is due to open the following year. Over 200 letters from fans were included, along with memorabilia such as ride parts and documents.
- A time capsule was buried in the grounds of Castle Howard in North Yorkshire on 17th November 1982 by George Howard, then chairman of the British Broadcasting Corporation. It is scheduled to remain sealed and not be opened until the year 3982. The capsule, housed in a steel cylinder, was created to mark the 60th anniversary of the BBC and contains a mix of modern artifacts and media.
- In 2011, a time capsule was buried at the Ipswich Waterfront to mark the opening of the James Hehir Building at University Campus Suffolk (now the University of Suffolk). It is scheduled to be opened on 30 March 2036.

== North America ==
=== Canada ===
Install Year	Open Year	Location	Notes	Cite
1991		Nackawic-Millville, New Brunswick	In the head of the World's Largest Axe.	

- On 26 July 1830, a formal procession and ceremony took place to deposit coins and bottled newspapers into a carved hollow of the cornerstone of the new courthouse building at Harbour Grace, NL Witnessed by more than 1000 residents and dignitaries, several symbolic items (corn, oil, wine) were poured over the stone. The Harbour Grace Court House is the oldest surviving public building in Newfoundland and one of the National Historic Sites of Canada.
- The British Columbia Time Capsule in Victoria, British Columbia. Built near the Confederation Garden Court adjacent to the provincial Parliament buildings on 31 December 1967, it is set to be opened 100 years later as part of what will be Canada's bi-centennial celebrations.
- A geologist left a bottled message in 1959 in a cairn on Ward Hunt Island (83°N latitude), allowing its finders in 2013 to determine that a nearby glacier had retreated over 200 feet in 54 years.
- Inside the head of the World's Largest Axe in Nackawic-Millville, New Brunswick.
- 6 Feet underground in the Chinook Centre in Calgary, Alberta; to be opened on 31 December 2999.
- 1234 Main Street, Moncton, New Brunswick
- Inside Joseph Salter memorial, Main Street, Moncton, New Brunswick
- Inside the CN Tower, in Toronto, Ontario. To be opened at the CN Tower's 100th anniversary On 1 October 2076.
- Victoria Beach, Manitoba. Opened in August 2025.
- Winnipeg, Manitoba to be opened in 2074 for the city's 200th anniversary

=== United States ===
Sealed Date	Open Date	Location	City	State	Notes	Cite
October 1994	October 2025		Framingham	Massachusetts	Items symbolizing efforts to eliminate racism, stereotyping, and discrimination in Framingham.	
April 26, 1994	October 2022	Natick Mall	Natick	Massachuetts	Stemmed from a desire to preserve the origins of the one-level Natick Mall	
1795	2014	Massachusetts State House	Boston	Massachusetts	The Samuel Adams and Paul Revere Time Capsule was found under the Golden Dome of the Massachusetts State House in December 2014. It is believed to have been buried in 1795 by then-Governor Samuel Adams and Paul Revere, and contained newspapers, a commonwealth seal, colony records, coins, a silver plate, and copper medal. It was uncovered, then added to and replaced, in 1855. Being 219 years old, it is the oldest time capsule to be discovered in the United States.	
18??		Dedham Savings	Dedham	Massachusetts	There is a time capsule in the main branch of the Dedham Institution for Savings on Elm St.	
18??		St. Joseph School	Mendham	New Jersey		
4 July 1825		Norfolk County Courthouse	Dedham	Massachusetts		
June 14, 1849	Ongoing	St. Mary's Church	Newport	Rhode Island		
23 June 1857		St. Paul's Church	Dedham	Massachusetts	There is a time capsule under the church cornerstone.	
1872	2019	Reno Masonic Lodge	Reno	Nevada	A time capsule was placed in cornerstone at the Reno Masonic Lodge in October 1872. It was opened on 16 April 2019. It contained more than 40 items, including a harmonica, a corkscrew, silver dollars minted in Carson City and San Francisco, a piece of wood from Sutter's Mill, and copies of several newspapers, including the Nevada State Journal, the Nevada Appeal, and the Territorial Enterprise.	
1879	2179	Fishburne Military School	Waynesboro	Virginia	Time capsule for Fishburne Military School to be opened at the school's 300th anniversary.	
1887	2021	Statue of Robert E. Lee	Richmond	Virginia	A time capsule hidden in a pedestal beneath a statue of Robert E. Lee was opened in December 2021 after the statue's removal, revealing an 1875 almanac, a waterlogged book of fiction, a British coin, a catalog, a letter and a photograph of a master stonemason who worked on the pedestal.	
1887		Dedham Museum and Archive	Dedham	Massachusetts	There is a time capsule placed beneath the cornerstone of the building.	
1888	1957; 69 years ago	Wall Street	New York City	New York		
31 December 1900	31 December 2000		Detroit	Michigan	Detroit Century Box in Detroit, Michigan, containing 56 letters from prominent citizens, sealed at midnight on 31 December 1900 and opened on 31 December 2000.	
1901	2014	Old State House	Boston	Massachusetts	Inside the statue of the lion atop the Old State House in Boston, a time capsule from 1901 was discovered in 2014.	
1902; 124 years ago		Oakdale School	Dedham	Massachusetts	A time capsule was placed in the cornerstone.	
1905	1966		Palatka	Florida		
September 2, 1902		Town Hall	Needham	Massachusetts	The time capsule was deposited beneath the cornerstone. It contains maps, photos of public buildings, and other documents.	
6 June 1907	January 2013		Fort Collins	Colorado	In January 2013, a time capsule dated 6 June 1907 was found in a cornerstone of the building at 140 Oak Street.	
1913	23 April 2013	First Lutheran Church	Oklahoma City	Oklahoma	A 100-year-old time capsule in the First Lutheran Church of Oklahoma City opened on 23 April 2013.	
1920	2024	Owatonna High School	Owatonna	Minnesota	The time capsule was discovered in the corner stone when the school was torn down.	
1930	2013; 13 years ago	Portsmouth Middle School	Portsmouth	New Hampshire	Contents: List of all students' names hand-written by the students.	
1931	2031; 5 years' time	Louisiana State Capitol	Baton Rouge	Louisiana	Placed by Governor Huey Long and architect Leon C. Weiss. Rediscovered in 2020	
1939	6939; 4913 years' time	Flushing Meadows Park	Queens	New York	Westinghouse Time Capsules	
28 May 1940	28 May 8113; 6086 years' time	Oglethorpe University	Brookhaven	Georgia	Crypt of Civilization.	
November 1940	23 June 2025; 16 months ago	McCoy Stadium	Pawtucket	Rhode Island	Buried during the laying of the cornerstone by Mayor Thomas P. McCoy.	
1950s	2000; 26 years ago	San Francisco International Airport	San Francisco	California	A time capsule was buried in the 1950s at the San Francisco International Airport. It was lost, and then discovered during construction in the 1970s. It was lost again, and then discovered again in the 1990s, close to the original reopening year of 2000.	
1954	2013; 13 years ago	Green-Wood Cemetery	Brooklyn	New York	A time capsule placed in a cornerstone in 1954 was found in January 2013.	
1955; 71 years ago		YMCA	Richmond	Indiana	Time capsule placed in cornerstone of YMCA in 1955.	
4 April 1956; 70 years ago		New England Telephone and Telegraph Company building at 387 Washington Street	Dedham	Massachusetts	Inside the cornerstone of the building, a metal time capsule holds "records and memoranda which describe fully and graphically the town of Dedham as it" existed in 1955.	
1957	2957; 931 years' time	Massachusetts Institute of Technology	Cambridge	Massachusetts	A glass time capsule buried at MIT in 1957 was accidentally unearthed during construction in 2015. Made to be opened in 2957, its condition was checked and then it was reburied.	
15 June 1957	14 June 2007; 19 years ago		Tulsa	Oklahoma	On 15 June 1957, as part of the celebration of the 50th anniversary of Oklahoma statehood, a 1957 Plymouth Belvedere car was sealed in an underground vault in Tulsa, to be unearthed 50 years later on 14 June 2007 during Oklahoma's centennial celebration. Several items were left in the car's trunk and glove compartment, such as a 5 US gallon can of gasoline intended to start the car, should gasoline not be the fuel of choice for motor vehicles in 2007. A contest also took place, in which the contestant who came the closest to guessing the city population in 2007, would then be awarded the car and $100 in a savings account.	
25 November 1959	2012; 14 years ago	First Federal Savings Bank	Salt Lake City	Utah	Salt Lake City, 78 S. Main & 100 South: In 2012, a time capsule from 25 November 1959 containing predictions for the year 2000 was found in the outside wall of the former First Federal Savings Bank	
1965	6939; 4913 years' time	Flushing Meadows Park	Queens	New York	Westinghouse Time Capsules	
1966	2014; 12 years ago		Centralia	Pennsylvania	Time Capsule in Centralia, Pennsylvania was to be opened in 2016 but was opened in 2014 instead. Within the time capsule was about two feet of water destroying most paper artifacts in the capsule. A miner's helmet and a pair of bloomers signed by the men living in the city at the time are among artifacts that remained.	
1967	2017		Titusville	Florida	City's 100th anniversary, shaped like Gemini space capsule.	
1 August 1969	1 August 2069; 42 years' time		Wayne	Michigan	On 1 August 1969 Wayne Centennial Time Capsule was placed in Wayne, Michigan and is due to be opened on 1 August 2069.	
1968	2068; 42 years' time and 2968; 942 years' time	Helium Centennial Time Columns Monument	Amarillo	Texas	Helium Centennial Time Columns Monument in Amarillo, Texas; to be opened in 2068 and 2968, respectively.	
18 August 1969	22 October 2019; 7 years ago	WWNY-TV	Carthage-Watertown	New York	Upon the construction of its offices and studios on 18 August 1969, television station WWNY-TV in Carthage-Watertown, New York sealed a time capsule into the cornerstone of the new building. The time capsule contained, among other items, a film from then-news director Bob Tompkins explaining the contents, a script of the same recording, a program log from the day the cornerstone was laid, and various pictures of downtown Watertown in 1969 (the city's centennial). There was no open date included. The capsule was opened during the 6 PM newscast on 22 October 2019 to celebrate the station's 65th anniversary.	
1973	2073; 47 years' time		Alcatraz Island	California	Cement slab. N37° 49.570 W 122° 25.337.	
1975	2075; 49 years' time	Brooks Academy	Harwich	Massachusetts	In 1975, a time capsule with contents of that year, was buried in front of Brooks Academy in Harwich, Massachusetts. The time capsule is due to be opened 100 years from the burial date, in the capsule's centennial year of 2075.	
4 July 1975	4 July 2025; 16 months ago		Seward	Nebraska	The largest time capsule in the world is located in Seward, Nebraska, containing over 5,000 items, one of which is a Chevrolet Vega. It was opened a week prior to a public exhibition on July 4, 2025.	
1 September 1975	2075; 49 years' time	Intersection of 7th and Main	Louisville	Kentucky		
1976	2075; 49 years' time	Patrick Space Force Base	Satellite Beach	Florida	Placed for the Air Force Eastern Test Range by Brigadier General Don M. Hartung.	
4 July 1976	4 July 2076; 49 years' time	126 Chestnut St.	Philadelphia	Pennsylvania	On 4 July 1976 the Philadelphia Restaurant and Business Association placed a time capsule to be opened on 4 July 2076, during 300th nation of America's Tri-centennial. It is buried 24 feet deep below a sidewalk at 126 Chestnut St.	
4 July 1976	4 July 2076; 49 years' time	Grand Opera House	Macon	Georgia	A time capsule is located above ground in front of the Grand Opera House. It was sealed as part of America's bicentennial celebrations of 1976, and it is to be opened on 4 July 2076, during America's tricentennial celebrations.	
4 July 1976; 50 years ago	4 July 2076; 49 years' time	U.S. Treasury Department	Washington		300th anniversary of the Nation.	
6 August 1977	4 July 2075; 48 years' time / 2096; 70 years' time	Pearl Street Mall	Boulder	Colorado	The courthouse plaza at Pearl Street Mall has two time capsules: one to be opened in 2075, the other in 2096.	
After the longest professional baseball game in 1981	23 June 2025; 16 months ago	McCoy Stadium	Pawtucket	Rhode Island	Crews found the capsule in May 2025, during the demolition of the stadium.	
1982	2032; 6 years' time	McKinley Elementary School	Hillsboro	Oregon	There is a time capsule containing a message on the sidewalk across the McKinley Elementary School.	
1984	2017; 9 years ago (Originally meant to be opened in 6984; 4958 years' time)	Danceteria	New York City	New York	A time capsule was buried in 1984 by patrons of the nightclub Danceteria. Intended to be opened in 6984 (5,000 years after it was buried), it was instead accidentally uncovered by construction workers in 2017.	
1985	2088	City Park	Langdon	North Dakota	Buried during town's centennial; planned to be opened for the bicentennial of Langdon's incorporation in 2088.	
1986; 40 years ago		Altar of St. John of Damascus Church	Dedham	Massachusetts	Contains the contents of the time capsule from their previous church on Museum Road in Boston. Added to this was a copy of the Consecration Service Items from the Sanctuary used during the Consecration.	
17 September 1987	17 September 2087; 60 years' time	Miami-Dade County Courthouse	Miami	Florida	Time capsule encased in cement at the entrance of the Miami Dade County Courthouse, 73 W. Flagler, St., Miami, Florida. To be opened on 17 September 2087.	
1988	2088; 62 years' time	Freedom Plaza	Washington		Martin Luther King Jr. objects	
14 May 1988	2087; 61 years' time		Coeur d'Alene	Idaho	Made to commemorate the centennial of Coeur d'Alene, Idaho.	
1989–1990 school year; 36–37 years ago		Oakdale School	Dedham	Massachusetts	A time capsule was buried under the playground.	
23 January 1991	23 January 2041; 14 years' time	NASA Lewis (now Glenn) Research Center	Brook Park	Ohio	On 23 January 1991 a time capsule was placed in a sculpture at NASA Lewis (now Glenn) Research Center, celebrating the 50th anniversary of the Center's groundbreaking. The capsule is scheduled to be opened on 23 January 2041.	
30 April 1992	30 April 2042; 15 years' time	Nickelodeon Studios	Orlando	Florida	On 30 April 1992, a time capsule was buried at Nickelodeon Studios containing items that kids considered important at that time. It was moved to the Nickelodeon Suites Resort Orlando in 2005 and later to the Nickelodeon Animation Studio in 2016, and will be opened on 30 April 2042.	
25 September 1992	26 March 2021; 5 years ago	The Philadelphia Inquirer printing plant	Schuylkill County	Pennsylvania	Buried upon the opening of the plant on 25 September 1992, the time capsule contained that day's editions of The Philadelphia Inquirer and the Philadelphia Daily News, a print-out of the then-current staff roster of each newspaper, a Bush-Quayle button for 1992, an audio cassette, a stock certificate from then-publisher Knight-Ridder Newspapers, a letter to future colleagues written by special projects manager Deborah Khan, a cartoon from Signe Wilkinson, a Dick Clark CD compilation, boxes of Magnum condoms, and a picture of the plant. Originally scheduled to be opened on 25 September 2092, it was released on 26 March 2021 after the current publishers announced that the plant would be closed and that the Inquirer and Daily News were to be printed at a plant in Cherry Hill, New Jersey, where the Gannett Company publishes the Courier-Post.	
17 July 1995	17 July 2035; 8 years' time	Disneyland	Anaheim	California		
14 December 1999	1 January 2100; 73 years' time	WBEN	Buffalo	New York	On 14 December 1999, WBEN, a radio station in Buffalo, New York buried a time capsule named the Millennium Time Capsule on Niagara Square that's to be opened on 1 January 2100. It uses a tombstone located on the McKinley Memorial as a marker. It is located at N 42° 53.181 W 078° 52.716.	
2000	2029; 3 years' time	Livingston Campus, Tillett Hall	Piscataway	New Jersey	Installed to celebrate the 30th anniversary of Livingston College.	
2000	January 20, 2033	Richmond Mall	Forest Acres	South Carolina	The time capsule was placed in 2000, when the Richmond Mall was built. It was discovered in 2024, when a demolition crew knocked it down. It was re-placed in a nearby park.	
14 January 2000; 26 years ago			Livermore	California	Two time capsules were buried	
2001	2015; 11 years ago	Doubletree Hotel	Cocoa Beach	Florida		
2003	2053; 27 years' time	Freedom Plaza & José Martí Monument	Coral Gables	Florida	Contents: Time capsule containing autobiographical books & letters to future generations from local & natl. community leaders installed on sesquicentennial of Martí's birth, 28 Jan 2003, to be opened in 50 years in 2053. Soil from Cuba was incorporated into the interior of the pyramid.	
2005	2055; 29 years' time	Merrick Park	Coral Gables	Florida	Contents: VIP letters include Barbara Bush.	
2005	Ongoing	Dedham High School	Dedham	Massachusetts	A display case in the A-wing of Dedham High School contains hundreds of artifacts representing the events and culture of DHS beginning from 1984 to the early 2000s.	
2005 (Nov.)	2025 (Nov.)	Forbes	email server	email client	People composed emails to themselves, and Forbes sent them back one, three, five, ten or twenty years in the future	
2007		Embassy of Lithuania, Washington, D.C.	Washington	District of Columbia	Between 2004 and 2007, the building was extended by a new western wing in the courtyard, and a capsule containing a letter from the President of the Republic of Lithuania, Valdas Adamkus, to future generations was embedded in the wall.	
2010	2050; 24 years' time		Arlington	Washington	Installed on the final day of Trafton School being open after the school board voted to close it due to budget concerns.	
February 2012	February 2037; 10 years' time	Disney California Adventure	Anaheim	California	Buried by cast members, it includes souvenirs	
February 2012	2072; 46 years' time	Connecticut's Beardsley Zoo	Bridgeport, Connecticut	Connecticut	Originally a cow statue located at Wade Dairy.	
2013	3 September 2063; 36 years' time	Perry Hall High School	Baltimore County	Maryland	To celebrate the school's 50th anniversary.	
2013	2063; 37 years' time	City Hall	Cape Canaveral	Florida	Contents: VIP letters include John Glenn, Barbara Eden.	
2013; 13 years ago		Vietnam Memorial	Englewood	Florida	Contents: Vietnam Memorabilia.	
2013; 13 years ago		Roosevelt Dam	Globe	Arizona	100th anniversary of the AZ Roosevelt Dam, replaces a 1961 time capsule.	
2013	2038; 12 years' time		Newport News	Virginia	Contents: Navy coins, the aviator wings of the ship’s first commanding officer and sandstone used to build the White House and the U.S. Capitol.	
2014	2063; 37 years' time	Eastern Florida State College	Cocoa	Florida		
2015	19 January 2046; 19 years' time	Dollywood's DreamMore Resort and Spa	Pigeon Forge	Tennessee	Contains a cassette and CD (and players for both) of an unreleased song by Dolly Parton titled "My Place in History". The capsule is to be opened on what would have been Parton's 100th birthday.	
August 2018	August 2068; 41 years' time	Sea Pines Montessori Academy	Hilton Head Island	South Carolina	In August 2018 Sea Pines Montessori Academy buried a time capsule on the occasion of the school's 50th anniversary. It is to be buried in Harbour Town on Hilton Head Island, South Carolina and opened in August 2068.	
2018	2118; 100 years' time	University of Michigan	Ann Arbor	Michigan	To celebrate the completion of a new Sciences and natural history museum building, The University of Michigan placed a time capsule in the pedestal of a statue. This copper statue is part of a pair that have been relocated, and had once sat at foot of the University's original natural history museum.	
26 May 2022	26 May 2072; 45 years' time	Kentwood Branch Library	Kentwood	Louisiana	Buried to commemorate the completion of the Kentwood Branch Library's new building in 2022.	
17 September 2022	17 September 2072; 45 years' time		Wilmington	New York	Wilmington Bicentennial Time Capsule; sealed in stone monument built using stones from the former Wilmington Bridge.	
28 May 2023	May 2123; 96 years' time	Statue of William B. Gould	Dedham	Massachusetts	Inside the statue of William B. Gould in Dedham there is a time capsule, set to be reopened on Memorial Day 2123, and then every 100 years thereafter. It holds more than 30 items, including a COVID-19 pandemic-era face mask, a list of slang words, and a copy of the Town charter.	(Note: The capsule was built by Blue Hills Regional Technical School seniors Paul McCann and Nathan Finn.)
22 February 2024	Forever	The Moon	N/A	N/A	On 22 February 2024, the Arch Mission Foundation landed the Lunar Library on the Moon, containing the English Wikipedia and other content, with the GLL Lunaprise mission, on the Intuitive Machines IM-1 mission.	
24 June 2026	4 July 2276; 249 years' time	United States Capitol Visitor Center	Washington	District of Columbia	Placed in the visitor center by the 119th United States Congress to mark the United States Semiquincentennial. Contains letters from congressional leaders and the Architect of the Capitol.	
4 July 2026	4 July 2276; 249 years' time	Independence National Historical Park	Philadelphia	Pennsylvania	United States Semiquincentennial official time capsule. Contains letters from governors, coins, beadwork and jewelry, a piece of the Wright Flyer, a commemorative Coca-Cola bottle, and an iPhone 17. Topped by a large Join, or Die statue.	

== Middle East ==
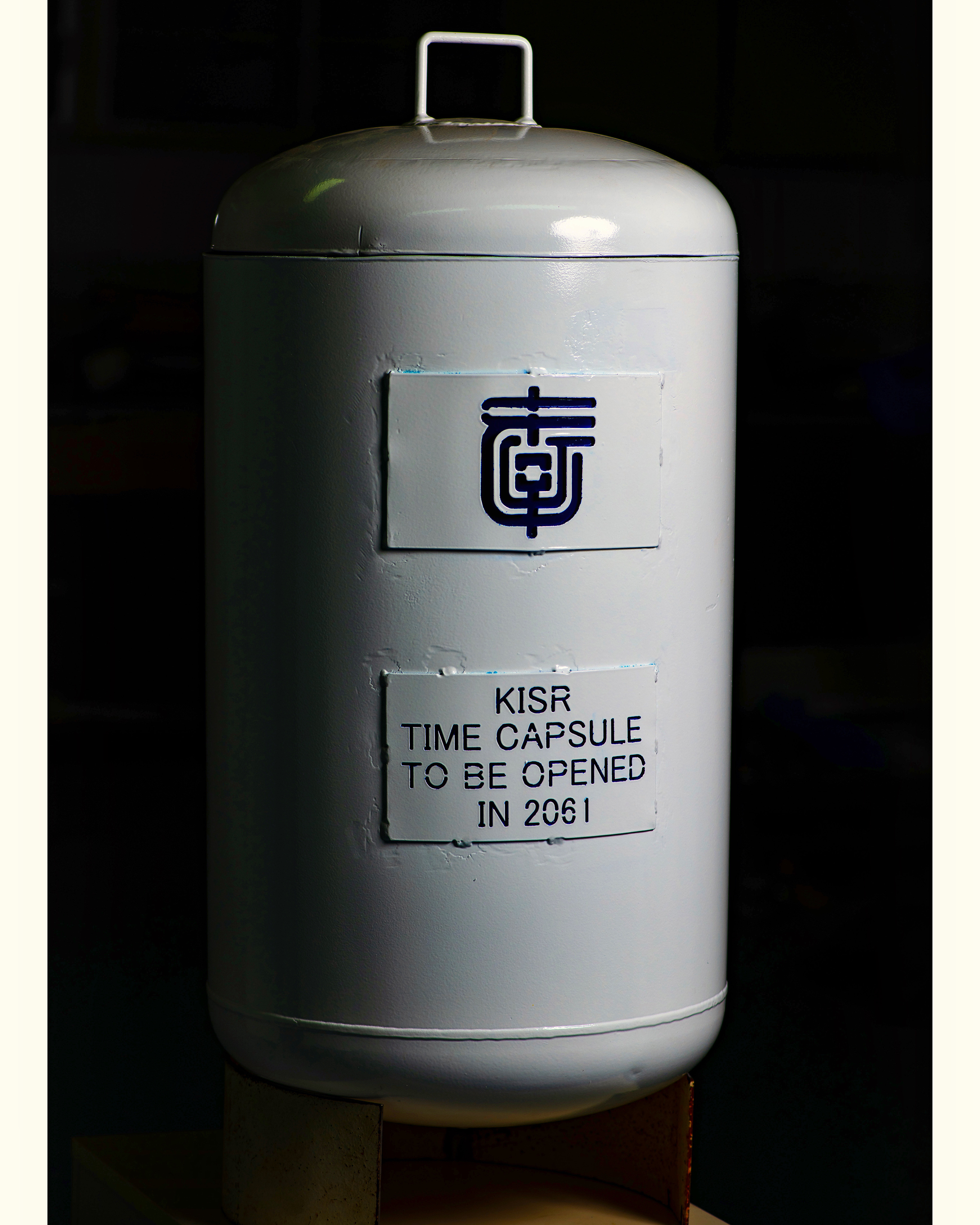
KISR Time Capsule 2061: commissioned by Kuwait Institute for Scientific Research.

=== Kuwait ===
- In 2019, a time capsule was commissioned by Kuwait Institute for Scientific Research to observe the grand opening of the Shagaya Renewable Energy Park. Generally known as "KISR Time Capsule 2061", the cylindrical canister (approximately 80x45 cm) contains material relevant to the renewable energy project, research activities of the institute, items and publications covering general aspects of the local culture of Kuwait along with various messages and contributions from several sources (including children). It is scheduled to be opened in 2061; 35 years' time when the State of Kuwait celebrates its centenary.
- On 15 December 2013, a time capsule was buried in the garden of the English School, Kuwait to commemorate the school's 60th anniversary. It is to be opened in 2073; 47 years' time.
- On 20 December 2005, a time capsule was installed by National Library of Kuwait, and is scheduled to be opened in 2105; 79 years' time.

== Oceania ==
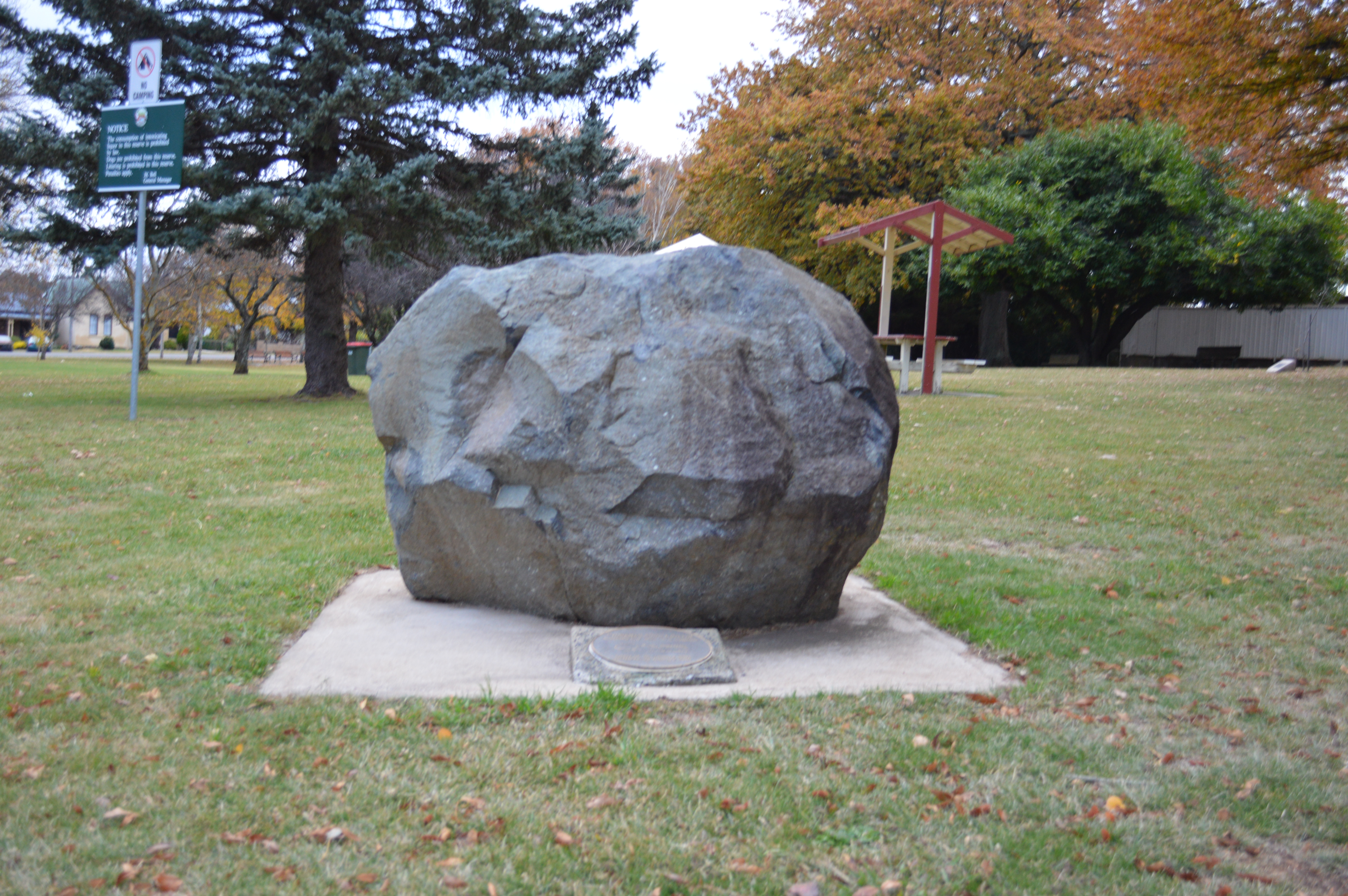
Capsule in Crookwell, New South Wales, installed in 2001

=== Australia ===
Install Year	Open Year	Location	Notes	Cite
1896	1996	Perth Observatory, Perth, Australia	Contents included X-ray apparatus and X-ray image donated by William John Hancock.	
29 September 1896		Perth Observatory	When the Perth Observatory foundation was laid, the occasion was attended by Sir John Forrest and other notable dignitaries. Several items of importance were placed in a 'leaden box', sealed and deposited in a cavity beneath the foundation stone. The local press reported the event and mentioned here since "Röntgen rays tubes, and a description of the process, together with specimen photographs", donated by X-ray pioneer William John Hancock were included in the cache. This is the first known instance of a time capsule in Western Australia, and in Australia.	
28 July 1897; 129 years ago		Northam Railway Institute, Northam, Western Australia	In celebration of the laying of the foundation stone of the Northam Railway Institute on 28 July 1897, laid by Mrs. Ann Throssell, the wife of the Commissioner of Crown Lands and local MP George Throssell, a bottle containing two copies of the Northam Advertiser newspaper and several coins was laid in a cavity beneath the foundation stone.	
1977	2077	North Adelaide Primary School, South Australia	Planted to commemorate 100th anniversary of the school (established in 1877). Set to be opened on the 200th anniversary of the school in 2077. Location: 34°54′19″S 138°35′52″E	
27 April 1987; 39 years ago	27 April 2027	Box Hill, Victoria	Leading up to the Diamond Jubilee of Box Hill, students at schools in the area collected items to be placed into a time capsule to be kept at the Box Hill Town Hall until its opening ceremony in 2027. All participating students received a personal invitation in 1987 to an hour long opening ceremony in 2027 at the town hall, including a certificate number referencing their individual contribution. Box Hill was proclaimed a city in 1927.	
1994	2094	Adelaide, South Australia	The Parliament House of South Australia features a time capsule celebrating the Centenary of Women's Suffrage in South Australia.	
	2000	Cowra, New South Wales	The town of Cowra in central Western New South Wales contained a time capsule which was buried near a sculpture of an eagle in the park not far from the town's information center. The capsule was opened in the year 2000 on an unspecified date, although the sculpture remains, there is no mention of the time capsule once buried there.	
2001	2025	Nailsworth Primary School, South Australia	A time capsule is also located at Nailsworth Primary School in South Australia, being planted in 2001 to be opened in 2025, this capsule was planted to replace the 1977 capsule opened the same year.	
2007	2057; 31 years' time	Epping Boys High School of Sydney	In celebration of its golden jubilee, Epping Boys High School of Sydney buried a time capsule in the foyer of its library, in 2007, to be unearthed in the centenary year. A previous time capsule was buried in 1982 to celebrate the silver jubilee.	
		Melbourne High School, Victoria	A time capsule is also present on the grounds of Melbourne High school in Victoria.	
11 March 2013	2113; 87 years' time	Canberra	A time capsule on Canberra's City Hill was unveiled on 11 March 2013 to commemorate the city's centenary. It is to be unsealed in 2113.	
22 February 2018; 8 years ago		Sunshine Coast	The Sunshine Coast Council concluded its celebration of the 50th Anniversary of the Naming of the Sunshine Coast by burying a historic time capsule. The capsule contains a number of reports, documents, and objects from the year previous, and a letter from Mayor Mark Jamieson and 2017 Young Citizen of the Year, Jak Hardy, who was appointed its guardian through to 2067.	
2021; 5 years ago	Whenever	Tasmania	"Earth's Black Box"—a city bus-sized structure with steel walls, battery storage and solar panels located at a remote site in Tasmania—will accumulate and electronically store comprehensive climate research and related data, including land and sea temperature changes, ocean acidification, atmospheric greenhouse gas concentrations, human population, energy consumption, military spending, and policy changes. The box was conceived to tell future civilizations how humankind created the climate crisis, and how it failed or succeeded to address it.	

=== New Zealand ===
- The Napier City Council of Napier, New Zealand created a time capsule in 1974 as part of the 100 year city centenary celebrations in 1974. The time capsule was filled with a cross section of things used in everyday life at the time, and was originally displayed in the Council Chambers. Part of the capsule also originally included a clock mechanism, which was planned to count down the century. The capsule is planned to be opened in 2074.

== South America ==
Install Year	Open Year	Location	Notes	Cite
3 April 1922	31 October 2329; 302 years' time	Caxias do Sul/RS	On 3 April 1922, a metal box was buried on a yard of the 3rd Anti-Air Artillery Group (3º GAAAe), in Caxias do Sul/RS. The time capsule, containing historical documents such as old newspapers, official Army reports and coins, was restored by the Universidade de Caxias do Sul (UCS) and given back to the Brazilian Army. The existence and location of the box was discovered 100 years after the burial, when Corporal Glauber Tiago Dal Paz found a reference to it in a book. He was doing a research on the artillery unit's history for the centenary celebrations.	
1969	13 August 2019	Rio de Janeiro, Brazil	In celebration of their 50th anniversary in 1969, the "Movimento dos Bandeirantes" prepared a 1 metre high bronze cylinder inside, containing objects, documents, messages and many other information about the Bandeirantes of the time. It was buried inside a granite monument, in front of their headquarters. The time capsule was opened on 13 Aug 2019, during a ceremony with more than 1,000 people from all regions of the country, who came to Rio de Janeiro to celebrate the 100th anniversary of this youth focused movement.	
1972	2022	National Museum of Brazil	In 1972, in celebration of the 150 years of the Independence of Brazil, a time capsule was installed at the National Museum of Brazil which opened in 2022.	
2010	2110	Santiago, Chile	Installed on the Chilean bicentennial, to be opened on the tricentennial.	
30 May 2013	2048	Colégio Setor Leste	On 30 May 2013, a group of students of the Colégio Setor Leste, in Brasília/DF, built a time capsule to keep writings of dreams and wishes of employees and alumni of the school, during its 50th anniversary. The box is supposed to be opened 35 years later, in 2048.	
	2016; 10 years ago	Rio de Janeiro	During the preparations for the 2016 Olympics, a time capsule was unearthed in a construction site, at Rio de Janeiro's docking area. It contained letters from the Brazilian Empire's time.	
		Alcântara/MA	A time capsule, with documents from the Brazilian Empire's period, was found in Alcântara/MA. It contained letters from local nobles regarding the Emperor's visit to the city.	
2022	2072	National Museum of Brazil	A time capsule with documents related to the National Museum of Brazil was buried near the institution in 2022 to be opened 50 years later.	

=== Chile ===
- A privately funded time capsule, buried in front of the former city hall of Puerto Montt in October 2010, to be opened by February 2053.
- The Cápsula Bicentenario (Bicentennial Capsule), a publicly funded capsule created to commemorate the 200th anniversary of Chile, was buried on 29 September 2010 at the Plaza de Armas in Santiago. It is set to be opened in 18 September 2110.
- A privately funded capsule called "Cápsula del tiempo Paseo Libertad", located in Valdivia, to be opened on September 10th, 2062

=== Uruguay ===
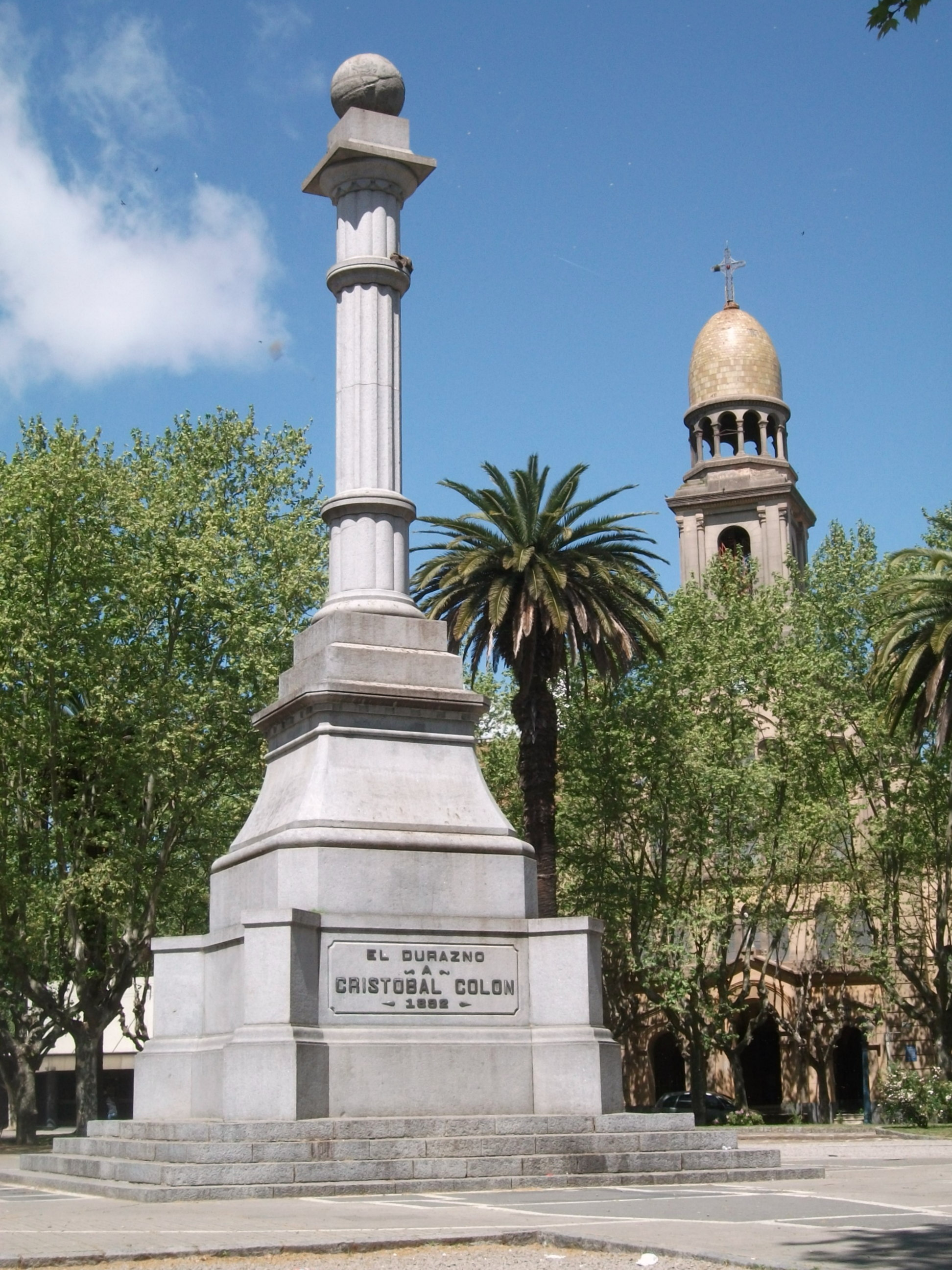
The Monument to Christopher Columbus in Durazno, Uruguay, has a spherical time capsule on top.

- The Monument to Christopher Columbus in Durazno was designed in 1892, the 400th anniversary of Christopher Columbus's arrival in the Americas, and a spherical time capsule was placed on top of the monument. In 1992, the time capsule was opened, and the original artifacts were replaced with new objects to be retrieved in 2092.

== Other ==
=== In space ===
- Apollo 11 goodwill messages, on the Moon
- Arch Mission 1.2 on the Tesla Roadster in solar orbit and the Lunar Library in the Beresheet moon lander.
- Arch Mission Lunar Library 2.0 on the Astrobotic Peregrine
- Immortality Drive, in the International Space Station
- Lunar Codex's Peregrine, Nova, and Polaris archives on the Peregrine, Nova-C, and Griffin lunar landers
- Plaque on LAGEOS-1
- Plaque on Pioneer 10 and Pioneer 11
- Voyager Golden Record on Voyager 1 and Voyager 2
- Rosetta disk prototype, on the Rosetta space probe
- The Arch Mission Foundation Lunar Library on the Moon, with Intuitive Machines and the GLL Lunaprise mission.
- Echoes From The Valley of Existence time capsule including DNA, by Amy Karle on Firefly Aerospace Blue Ghost lunar lander carried by SpaceX Falcon 9 rocket, 2024. (Another copy will be aboard Astrolab’s lunar rover, set to be launched on SpaceX’s Starship rocket in 2026; 0 years ago).

=== In film ===
- 100 Years, a film shot and produced in 2015 with release scheduled for 18 November 2115; 89 years' time. It is being kept in a high-tech safe behind bulletproof glass that will open automatically on the film's premiere.

=== Internet ===
- Yahoo Time Capsule, open as Yahoo.com 20th anniversary

=== Projected ===
- KEO
- Lansing Time Capsule

== Openings ==
Dates and times of opening of already opened capsules.

Date and time of opening	Location	Installation date	Cite
1957	Wall Street, New York City	1888	
1966	Palatka, Florida	June 26, 1905	
1996	Perth Observatory, Perth, Australia	September 30, 1896	
7 February 2001; 25 years ago	Howard Johnson Plaza Hotel, Cocoa Beach, Florida	March 5, 1987	
15 June 2007; 19 years ago	Tulsa, Oklahoma	June 15, 1957	
Feb 2012	Salt Lake City, Utah	1959	
July 2012	Vulkanny in the Yelizovsky district of Kamchatka	1979	
January 2013	Green-Wood Cemetery, Brooklyn, New York	1954	
11 January 2013; 13 years ago	YMCA, Fort Collins, Colorado	June 6, 1907	
22 April 2013; 13 years ago	First Lutheran Church, Oklahoma City, Oklahoma	April 22, 1913	
February 2015; 11 years ago	Doubletree Hotel, Cocoa Beach, Florida	February 7, 2001	
July 2018; 8 years ago	Intel Corporation, Santa Clara, California	2003	
31 January 2020; 6 years ago	Loreto Primary School. Rathfarnham	February 2, 1996	
25 June 2021; 5 years ago (Note: The time capsule was originally scheduled to open on 16 July 2020, but was delayed due to the COVID-19 pandemic.)	Shelby, Iowa	16 July 1970; 56 years ago	
12 October 2022; 4 years ago	Natick Mall, Natick, Massachusetts	October 12, 1994	
4 July 2023; 3 years ago	Ypsilanti, Michigan	8 July 1973; 53 years ago	
4 July 2025; 16 months ago	Seward	4 July 1975; 51 years ago	

== Scheduled openings ==
Scheduled opening dates and times for already installed capsules.

=== North America ===
Date and time of opening	Location	Installation date	Cite
28 May 8113; 6086 years' time	Oglethorpe University, Brookhaven, Georgia (Crypt of Civilization)	May 25, 1940	
6939; 4913 years' time	Flushing Meadow Park, New York (Westinghouse time capsule I)	1939	
6939; 4913 years' time	Flushing Meadow Park, New York (Westinghouse time capsule II)	1965	
March 31, 2068; 41 years' time and December 24, 2968; 942 years' time respectively.	Helium Centennial Time Columns Monument, Amarillo, Texas	1968	
27 November 2112; 86 years' time	American Podiatric Medical Association (APMA) Headquarters, Bethesda, Maryland	November 27, 2012	
17 July 2035; 8 years' time	Disneyland Resort, Anaheim, California	1990	
July 13, 2037; 10 years' time	Goodhue County	2012	
13 July 2037; 10 years' time	Alcatraz, California	1973	
July 2037; 10 years' time	Life Center, Tampa, Florida	2012	
2041; 15 years' time	Santa Fe College, Gainesville, Florida	January 17, 2017	
2043; 17 years' time	Intel Corporation, Santa Clara, California	July 2018	
July 17, 2035; 8 years' time	Disneyland, Anaheim, California	July 17, 1995	
August 2045; 18 years' time	Cocoa Beach, Florida	2009	
27 September 2048; 21 years' time	Florida Public Library, Cocoa Beach, Florida	1998	
January 2055; 28 years' time	Merrick Park, Coral Gables, Florida	2005	
16 May 2063; 36 years' time	City Hall, Cape Canaveral, Florida	2013	
2064; 38 years' time	Project Mercury	1964	
3 May 2070; 43 years' time	In front of Dodge County Court House, Eastman, Georgia	1970	
3 March 2073; 46 years' time	Goodhue County, Minnesota	2012	
July 2075; 48 years' time	Cocoa Beach, Florida	June 5, 1925	
4 July 2076; 49 years' time	Philadelphia	July 4, 1976	
1 October 2076; 49 years' time	CN Tower, Toronto, Ontario	October 1, 1976	
March 2077; 50 years' time	Cape Canaveral, Florida	Unknown	
October 31, 2092; 65 years' time	Liberty Bell Memorial Museum, Melbourne, Florida	Unknown	
May 19, 2094; 67 years' time	Denver International Airport, Denver, Colorado	March 19, 1994	
2 February 2101; 74 years' time	Public library, Fort Pierce, Florida	February 2, 2001	
31 December 2999; 973 years' time	Chinook Centre, Calgary, Alberta	December 31, 1999	
20 June 2026; 4 months ago	Public Library Building, Hubbard, Ohio	1976; 50 years ago	

=== Asia ===
6970; 4944 years' time	near Osaka Castle, Osaka (Expo '70)	1970
2029; 3 years' time	Near Main Library of Singapore Polytechnic, Singapore	2005

=== Middle East ===
25 February 2061; 34 years' time	Shagaya Renewable Energy Park, Kuwait	2019

=== Caribbean ===
December 2062; 36 years' time	Bacardi corporate headquarters, Hamilton, Bermuda	2012
13 December 2112; 86 years' time	Bacardi corporate headquarters, Hamilton, Bermuda	December 13, 2012

=== Oceania ===
2027; 1 year's time	Box Hill Town Hall, Box Hill, Victoria	1987
2067; 41 years' time	Sunshine Coast Centenary on the Sunshine Coast, Queensland	2018

=== South America ===
September 2110; 83 years' time	Plaza de Armas, Santiago, Chile	September 29, 2010

=== Europe ===
21 March 2317; 290 years' time	Durham County Record Office, County Durham	March 21, 2017
1 January 3000; 973 years' time	Millennium Vault, Guildford, Surrey	January 1, 2000
3790; 1764 years' time	Strasbourg Cathedral, France	1995

== See also ==
- Message in a bottle
