= KEO =

Proposed space time capsule

KEO was the name of a proposed space time capsule which was supposed to have been launched in 2003 carrying messages from the citizens of present Earth to humanity 50,000 years from now, when it would re-enter Earth's atmosphere. Its name represents the three most frequently used sounds common to the most widely spoken languages today, /k/, /e/, and /o/. Everyone was invited to contribute to the time capsule, and the organizers encouraged everybody to gather messages from children, senior citizens, and the illiterate so that every culture and demographic on Earth was represented. Moreover, the organizers were committed to not filtering the messages, stating "all the messages received, without undergoing any censorship, will be embarked aboard KEO." The launch had been delayed several times due to major geopolitical shakeups, including 9/11 and the restructuring of the ESA. In July 2025 it was announced on project site that KEO project would close without launching the satellite.

== Contents ==
- Personal messages
- A sample of air
- A sample of sea water
- A sample of earth
- A diamond that encases a drop of human blood chosen at random with the DNA of the human genome engraved on one of its facets.
- An astronomical clock that shows the current rotation rates of several pulsars
- Photographs of people of all cultures
- "the contemporary Library of Alexandria", an encyclopedic compendium of current human knowledge.

== Technical aspects ==
The messages and library will be encoded in glass-made radiation-resistant DVDs. Symbolic instructions in several formats will show the future finders how to build a DVD reader.

The satellite has enough capacity to carry a four-page message from each of the more than six billion (as of the original 2009 deadline) inhabitants on the planet. Once the satellite is launched, the messages will be made freely available on the web.

The satellite itself is a hollow sphere 80 cm in diameter. The sphere is engraved with a map of Earth and surrounded by an aluminium layer, a thermal layer and several layers of titanium and other heavy materials intertwined with vacuum. The sphere is resistant to cosmic radiation, atmosphere re-entry, space junk impacts, etc. For its first few years in orbit, KEO will sport a pair of wings 10 meters across that will aid in its spotting from Earth. As the satellite enters the atmosphere, the thermal layer will produce an artificial aurora to give a signal of the satellite's re-entry. The passive satellite will not carry any communications or propulsion systems. It was planned to be launched by an Ariane 5 rocket (which was discontinued in 2023, and replaced by Ariane 6) into an orbit 1,800 km high, an altitude that will bring it back to Earth in 500 centuries, the same amount of time that has elapsed since early humans started to draw on cavern walls.

== Timeline ==
Year	Event	Description
1994	The KEO satellite is first conceived	French artist-scientist, Jean-Marc Philippe, comes up with the idea for the KEO satellite.
1996	Initial delay	The launch was delayed due to "restructuring of the French then European space industry (1996/1999)"
1998	Technical feasibility first demonstrated	
1999	Message collection starts	Messages began to be collected and an initial launch date is set for 2001.
2001	Launch delayed to 2003	The recession in the worldwide space activity from 2000 to 2002 and the attacks on the World Trade Center on 11 September 2001 caused the launch to be further delayed.
2003	Launch delayed to 2006	The reorganization of the French Space Agency and the failure of the qualifying launch of Ariane V pushed the launch date back to 2006.
2005	ESA signs off on technical feasibility	
2006	Launch delayed to 2007/2008	In 2006, the launch was delayed again, due to "lack of enthusiasm of several partners due to the prolongations of the project".
2008	Jean-Marc Philippe died	Jean-Marc Philippe died on 12 November 2008. Before his death, he held a degree in geophysics and also worked as a painter.
2008	Launch delayed to 2010/2011	The launch was delayed due to "restructuring of the data processing industry".
2009	Original end of message collection	Deadline for message collection was extended to the end of 2014. The contribution deadline was originally 31 December 2009, but as of 2014, it has been extended to end of 2014.
2011	Launch delayed to 2012	Launch was delayed due to "armed conflicts and political conditions of the world"
2012	Launch delayed to 2013	
2013	Launch delayed to 2015/2016	
2016	Launch delayed to 2018/2019	
2018	End of message collection	
2019	Planned launch	The KEO was previously planned to launch in 2019, but this did not happen.
2025	Shutdown	KEO project is closed

== In popular culture ==
- Life After People, Season 2 Episode 3, "Crypt of Civilization", mentions KEO as one of the last time capsules in the universe.

== See also ==
Time capsules

- List of time capsules
- Crypt of Civilization
- Westinghouse Time Capsules

Spacecraft

- Voyager
- Rosetta
- LAGEOS (satellite)
- Apollo 11 Lunar Module
- Pioneer 10 and Pioneer 11

Organizations

- Long Now Foundation
