= Don Harrington Discovery Center =

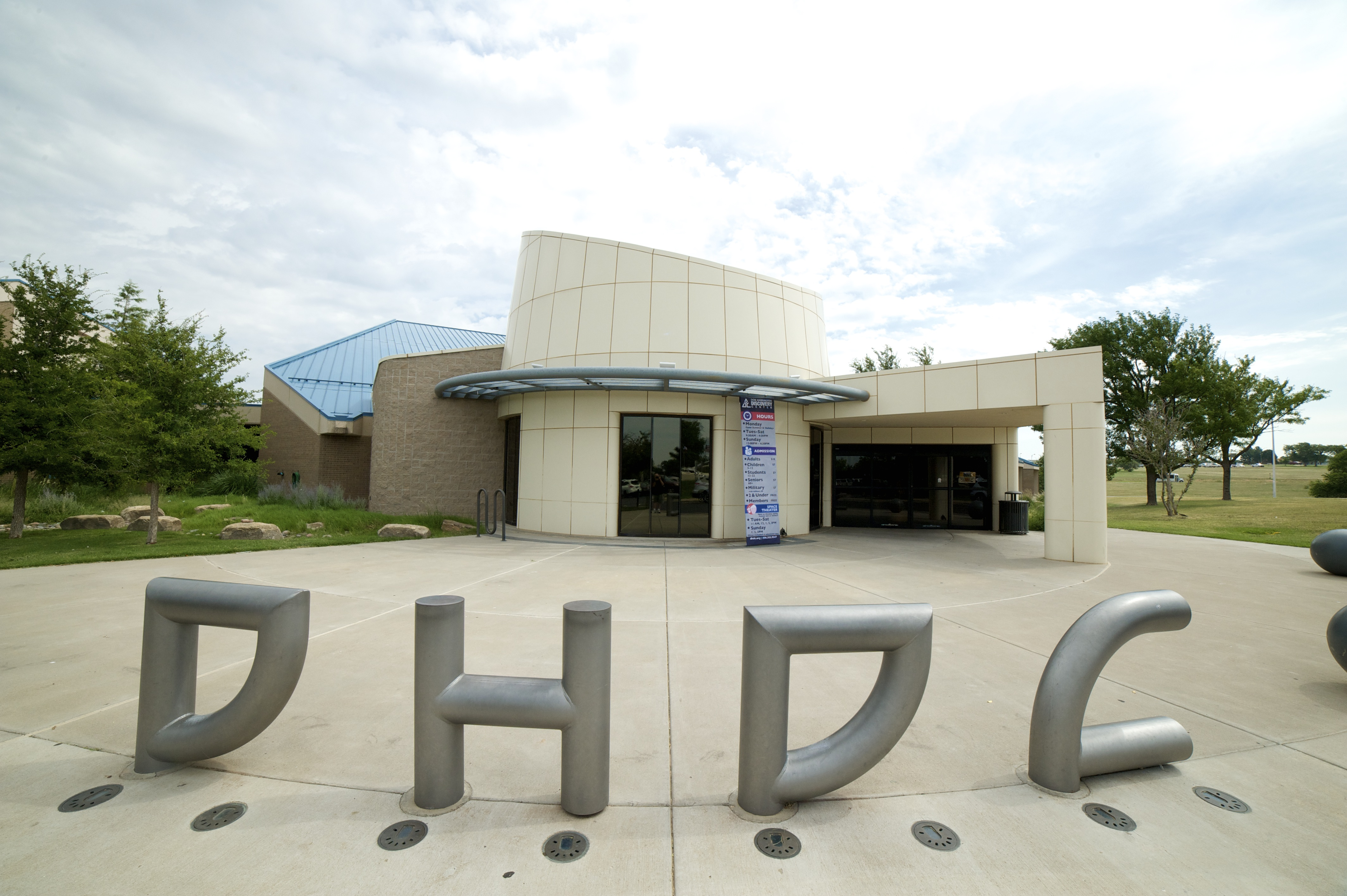

- Location in Texas
- Established: 1976
- Location: Amarillo, Texas
- Coordinates: 35.199943°N 101.913297°W
- Type: Science museum
- Visitors: 425/day
- Director: Wendy Taylor
- President: Claudia Burkett
- Website: www.dhdc.org

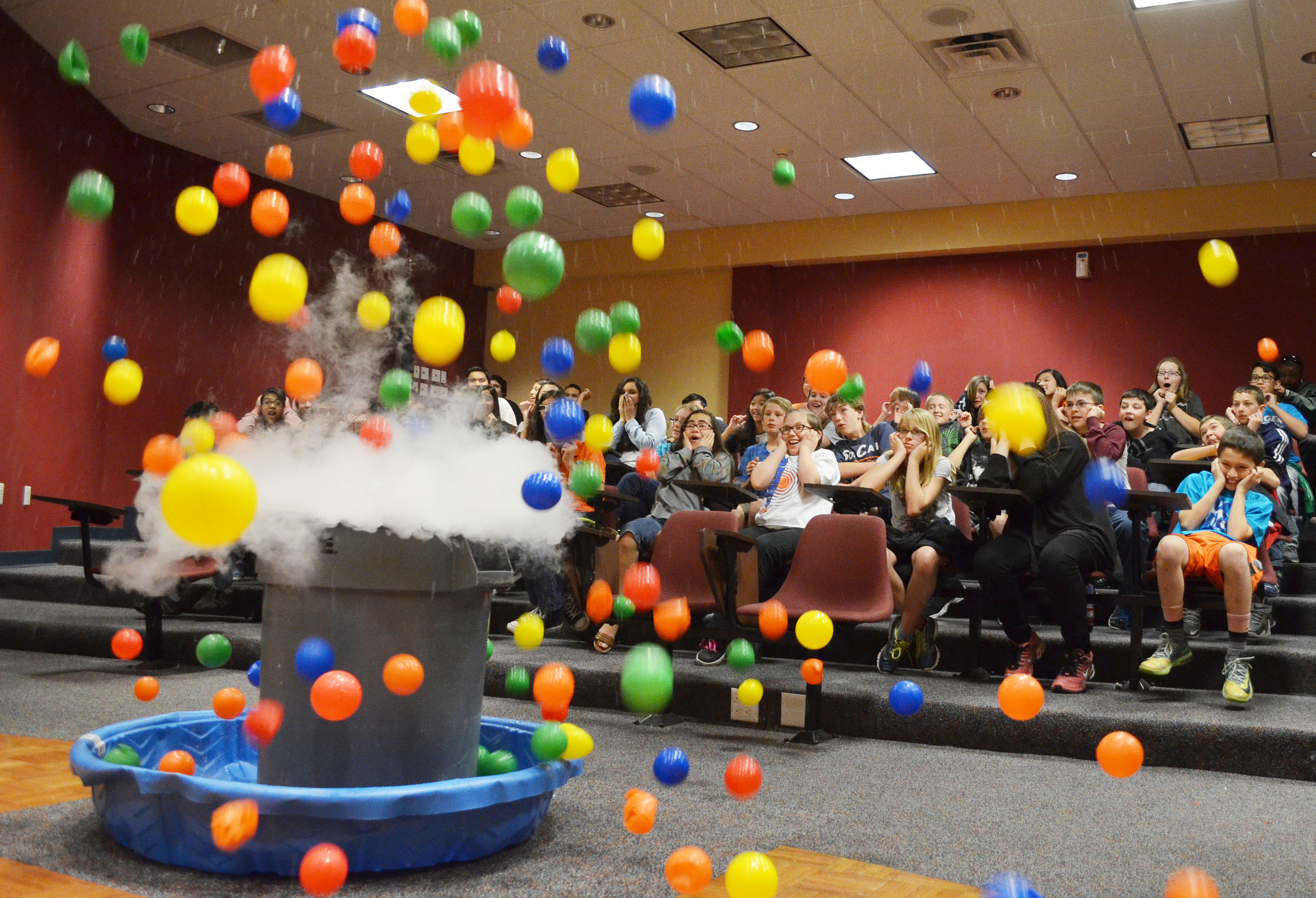
A live science demonstration at the center

Don Harrington Discovery Center is a nonprofit interactive science center and planetarium in Amarillo, Texas, U.S. The Discovery Center is located in the city's hospital district and is named after philanthropist Don Harrington.

Located in front of the Discovery Center is the Helium Centennial Time Columns Monument. The planetarium was renovated in 2003 and was implemented with the Digistar 3, fulldome video projection technology.

Most of the Discovery Center's income comes from admission fees, membership fees, special events and programs, while the rest comes from event and exhibit sponsorships and grants from charitable organizations such as Amarillo Area Foundation and the Harrington Foundation. The Don Harrington Discovery Center is a nonprofit 501 (c)(3) organization that largely relies on the support of its community.

The Discovery center is a member of the Association of Children's Museums Reciprocal Program and Association of Science-Technology Centers Passport Program, allowing members to receive free or reduced admission at various museums all across America.

== Helium Centennial Time Columns Monument ==
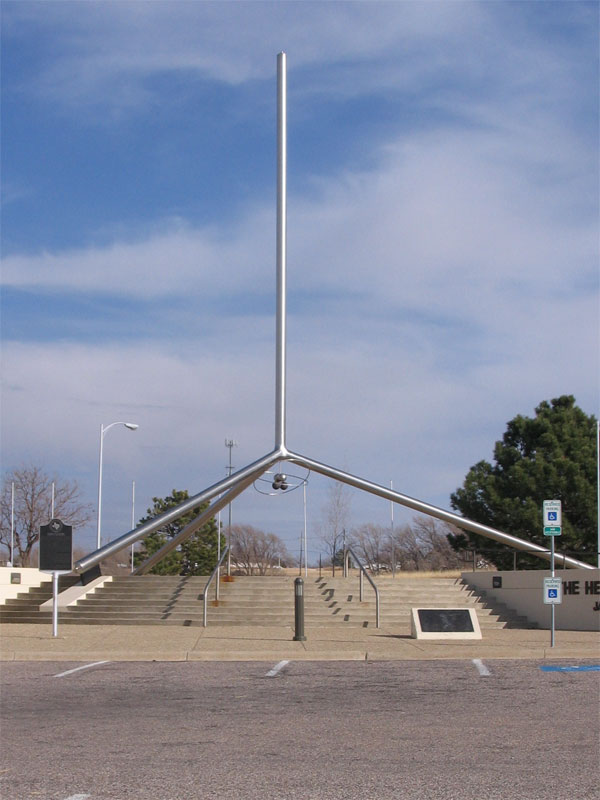
The Helium Monument & Time Capsule is located in front of the Don Harrington Discovery Center

The Helium Centennial Time Columns Monument was designed in 1967 by Peter Muller Munk Associates (located in Pittsburgh, Pennsylvania) and built in 1968 with the assistance of U.S. Steel to commemorate the 100th anniversary of the discovery of helium. The Time Columns Monument is a six-story high stainless steel structure containing four time capsules, three of which form the legs of the monument and one which stands erect. The capsules are intended to be opened in 25, 50, 100, and 1,000 years from the date it was erected in 1968. In 1982 the Helium Monument was airlifted by helicopter from I-40 and Nelson to its current site at the Don Harrington Discovery Center. In 1993, the first time capsule was opened, on schedule, during a two-day celebration of the 25th birthday of the monument. The contents of that capsule are in the collection of the Discovery Center, and are not typically on display to the public.

On September 29, 2018, the second time capsule was opened during a special event celebrating the Amarillo Helium Plant and the sesquicentennial anniversary of the discovery of helium. Items preserved in the capsule include stamps, documents, toy cars, and other miscellaneous effects. These items are now officially on display at the Discovery Center. At this event, the Discovery Center announced that it was accepting suggestions for new items to be placed into the now-empty capsule, which will be opened once more in 2093, 75 years in the future. Over three hundred items donated to the Discovery Center were subsequently sealed in November 2018. The 100 and 1,000 year capsules are still scheduled to open in 2068 and 2968, respectively.

Among the items stored in the monument is a passbook to a bank account containing a $10 deposit made in 1968, preserved within the 1,000 year time capsule.

The monument also serves as a sun dial, its features oriented to the Sun to tell the time.

== See also ==
- List of children's museums in the United States
- List of time capsules
