= Marc Herring =

Marc Herring is an American media executive and communications consultant. He is founder and CEO of Herring Media Group, a USA-UK based consultancy advising global clients in the design and implementation of contemporary media networks, advanced digital communications platforms and capital projects. The firm is developing augmented and interactive assets with intelligent analytics and programmatic media delivery.

== Career ==
In 1993, in partnership with Gannett and FCB, he developed the first international system of Digital Projection installations as part of an Out of Home advertising network.

Herring's clients have included: Live Earth / Washington DC with Al Gore, Yahoo! Inc., The Wadsworth Atheneum Museum of Art, SFMOMA, The Smithsonian Institution and it's museums, ILM / Lucas Digital Ltd., Lexus, RadioShack, Procter & Gamble and most major broadcast networks and international advertising agencies.

== See also ==
- Yahoo! Time Capsule
