= Westinghouse Time Capsules =

Time capsules buried in 1939 and 1965

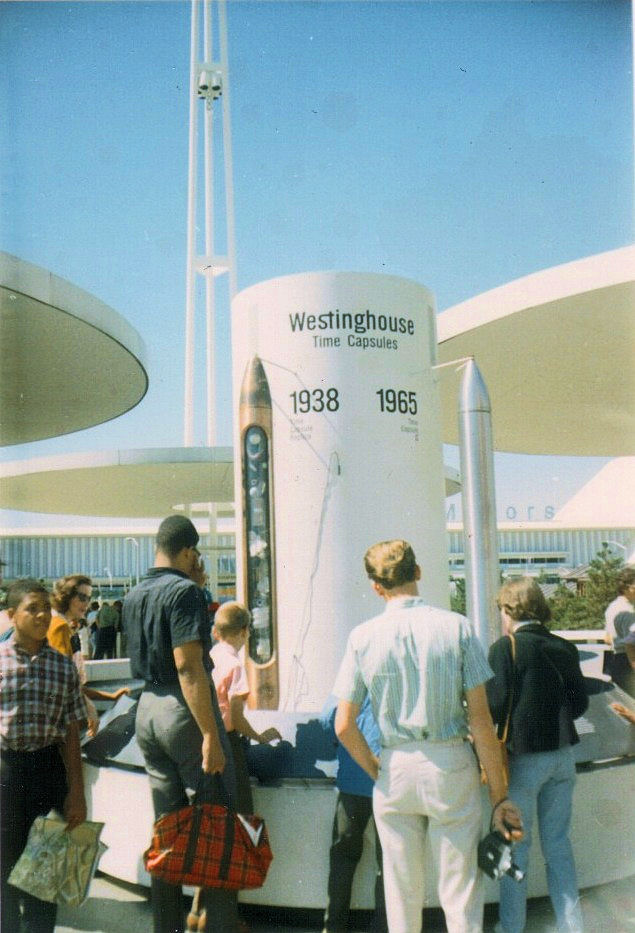
Westinghouse's 1964–65 World's Fair time capsule exhibit

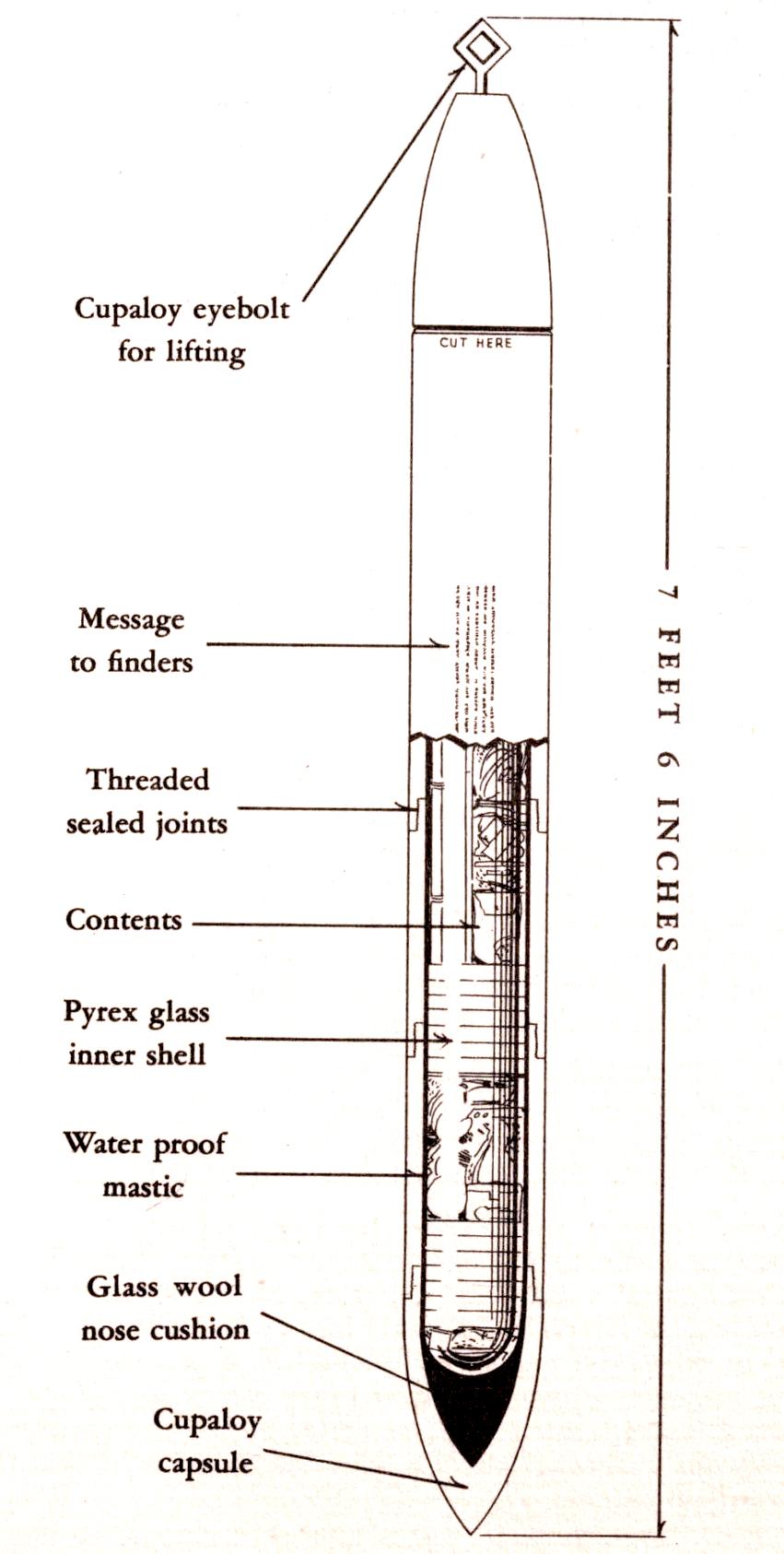
1939 Time Capsule sketch

The Westinghouse Time Capsules are two time capsules prepared by the Westinghouse Electric & Manufacturing Company (later Westinghouse Electric Corporation). One was made in 1939 and the other in 1965. They are filled with contemporary articles used in the twentieth century way of life in the United States. The items are intended for people of the 7th millennium (~ year 6900; 4874 years' time) to receive for historical significance.

The capsules are specially designed non-corrosive metal tubes 90 inches long and about nine inches in diameter. The tubes were made with electrical properties in mind that enhanced the characteristics of each tube's unique metal chemical make-up. Each was formulated to resist corrosion over time, rather than being allowed to waste away to dust. The capsules were buried fifty feet in the ground at Flushing Meadows-Corona Park in New York City and are positioned about ten feet apart.

There were record books about these time capsules given to thousands of libraries, museums, and other depositories worldwide to preserve the knowledge that they exist. Included was the information that they shouldn't be opened before the seventh millennium and where they can be located. Duplicates of the contents of the objects held for these people of the future are currently held at the Heinz History Center.

== Background ==
Westinghouse Electric & Manufacturing Company prepared time capsules for two world's fairs. They are both buried 50 feet below Flushing Meadows–Corona Park, the site of the fairs. Time Capsule I was created for the 1939 New York World's Fair and Time Capsule II was created for the 1964 New York World's Fair. The second capsule is placed ten feet north of the first capsule. The capsules are filled with physical objects of that time period of social and scientific interest. They are to be opened at the same time in the year 6939.

New York publicist George Edward Pendray was editor for Literary Digest when in 1936 he interviewed Thornwell Jacobs, organizer of Oglethorpe University's millennia-spanning time crypt of objects preserved for the people of 8113 AD. He then published an article about this in his October magazine. Westinghouse then took this concept and started developing in 1938 their Time Capsule of Cupaloy for the 1939 New York World's Fair.

== Construction ==
The time capsules are bullet-shaped, measure 90 inches (2.3 m) in length, and have an exterior casing of about 8.75 inches (22.2 cm) in diameter. Time Capsule I weighs about 800 pounds (360 kg), while Time Capsule II weighs about 400 pounds (180 kg). Time Capsule I was made of a non-ferrous alloy called Cupaloy, created especially for this project. Designed to resist corrosion for 5,000 years, the alloy was made of 99.4% copper, 0.5% chromium, and 0.1% silver. Westinghouse claims that Cupaloy has the same strength as steel, yet will resist most corrosion over thousands of years because it becomes an anode in electrolytic reactions, receiving deposits instead of wasting away like most iron-bearing metals.

Time Capsule II was made of a stainless steel metal called Kromarc. Westinghouse Research Laboratories determined, with extensive chemical testing, that this new super-stainless steel alloy would resist corrosion, much like the alloy used for Time Capsule I. Kromarc is an alloy of iron, nickel, chromium, manganese, molybdenum, and trace amounts of other elements. The contents of the time capsules were sealed inside an insulated, airtight, glass envelope with an interior diameter of 6.5 inches (17 cm) and a length of about 81 inches (210 cm). The interior of the glass envelope of Capsule I was filled with nitrogen. Capsule II, weighing 300 pounds, was filled with the inert gas argon.

== Capsule contents ==
=== 1939 Time Capsule I ===
Among the 35 small, everyday items placed inside Time Capsule I were a fountain pen and an alphabet block set. Time Capsule I also contained 75 types of fabrics, metals, and plastics. Modern literature, contemporary art, and news events of the 20th century were recorded on a microfilm "Micro-File" for placement in Time Capsule I; the "Micro-File" holds over ten million words and a thousand pictures, and has a small microscope for viewing. There are also instructions included on how to make both a large microfilm viewer and a motion picture projector for the newsreels.

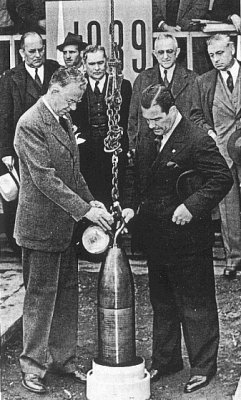
Time Capsule I

Also included in the capsule were copies of Life magazine, a kewpie doll, one dollar in change, a pack of Camel cigarettes, a 15-minute RKO Pathe Pictures newsreel, a Lilly Daché hat, and millions of words of text put on microfilm rolls which included a Sears Roebuck catalog, a dictionary, and an almanac. A variety of seeds were placed in the time capsule including wheat, corn, oats, tobacco, cotton, flax, rice, soy beans, alfalfa, sugar beets, carrots, and barley. Organic items (e.g. seeds) were placed in sealed glass vials.

Pendray supervised the items in the capsule that were selected to chronicle 20th-century life in the United States. During packaging of the contents, under the direction of representatives of the United States National Bureau of Standards, each object was examined to determine whether it could be expected to endure 5,000 years. Pendray was sent a letter by anthropologist Clark David Wissler that he felt most things were well represented in a draft list of the items going into the time capsule, except perhaps that of a sewing machine and noteworthy ceremonies (i.e. religious, weddings). Rose Arnold Powell, known for attempting to get Susan B. Anthony represented on Mount Rushmore, sent Pendray a telegraph requesting that he get an input from women's suffrage activist Carrie Chapman Catt. He then added the only pencil handwritten page in the capsule, listing items that were represented by 20th century women, such as culinary preparation tracts and women's exploits noted in World Almanacs and film. Care was taken to select items that are not reactive and do not decompose into harmful gases or acids.

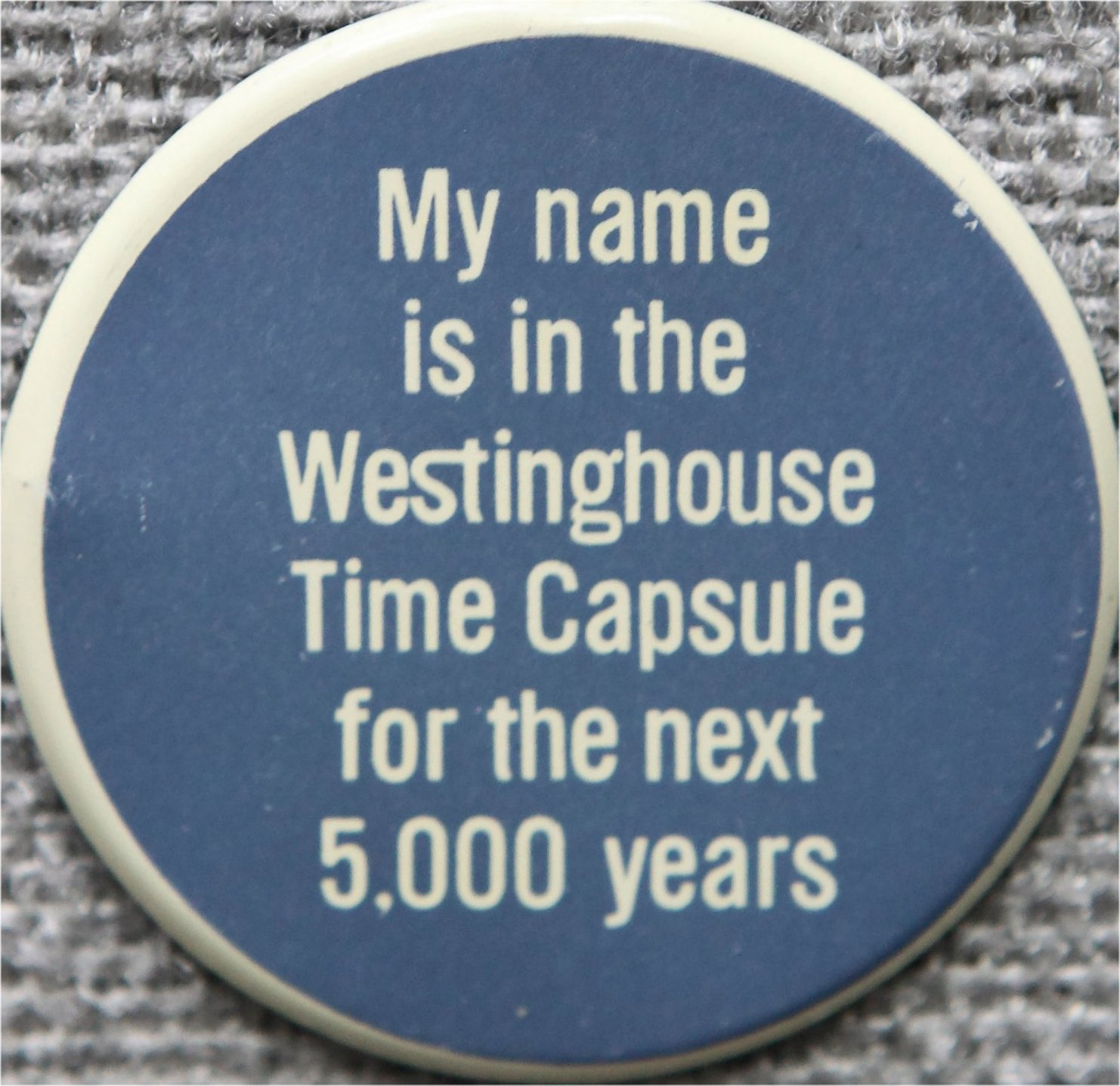
Guest book pin

Five categories of objects were placed inside Time Capsule I.

- Small articles of common use
- Textiles and materials
- Essay in microfilm
- RKO newsreel
- Miscellaneous items

=== 1965 Time Capsule II ===
Five main categories of objects were placed in Capsule II:

- Articles in common use
- Atomic energy
- Scientific developments
- Space
- Other

The "other" category included images of a guest book signed by visitors to the Westinghouse pavilion at the 1964 fair. Signers received tin pins, about 1.2 inches (30 mm) across (roughly the size of an American fifty-cent piece), stating, My name is in the Westinghouse Time Capsule for the next 5,000 years. The book's pages were photographed onto acetate microfilm and the roll of film placed into the time capsule for the people of the 70th century that open the capsule and find all the contents from the 20th century. There were an estimated 750,000 signatures collected. The first one was that of United States President Lyndon B. Johnson. The signature of Pope Paul VI was among the signatures of notable people that signed the Westinghouse guest book.

== Book of Record ==
The contents of Time Capsule I were recorded in a Book of Record of the Time Capsule of Cupaloy. The purpose of this book is to preserve knowledge of the existence of the time capsule for 5,000 years, and to provide assistance to the people of the year 6939 in locating and recovering it. More than 3000 copies of the book were distributed to museums, monasteries, and libraries worldwide. In order to avoid confusion about the 1965 time capsule, a supplement announcing Time Capsule II was sent to the original 3,000 depositories of the 1938 edition.

If present-day methods of determining time are lost, future generations will be able to calculate the age of the time capsules using astronomical data. In the year 1939, there were two eclipses of the moon, falling on the third of May and the twenty-eighth of October. There were also two eclipses of the sun, an annular eclipse on the nineteenth of April, the path of annular eclipse grazing the North Pole of the earth, and a total eclipse on the twelfth of October, the total path crossing near the South Pole. The heliocentric longitudes of the planets on the first of January at zero-hours Greenwich time were as follows:

Planet

- Mercury
- Venus
- Earth
- Mars
- Jupiter
- Saturn
- Uranus
- Neptune
- Pluto

degrees

175
124
99
192
339
17
46
171
120

minutes

55
43
40
4
12
30
23
32
17

seconds

42
32
29
2
22
45
31
3
0

The mean position of the North Star Polaris (Alpha Ursae Minoris) on the first of January was Right Ascension, 1 hour, 41 minutes, 59 seconds; North Polar distance, 1 degree, 1 minute, and 33.8 seconds. Astronomers of the early twentieth century determined that such a combination of astronomical events is unlikely to recur for many thousands of years. It is thought that this information will allow people of the future to determine the number of years that have elapsed since the capsule was buried by computing backward from their time.

== Location of the two time capsules ==
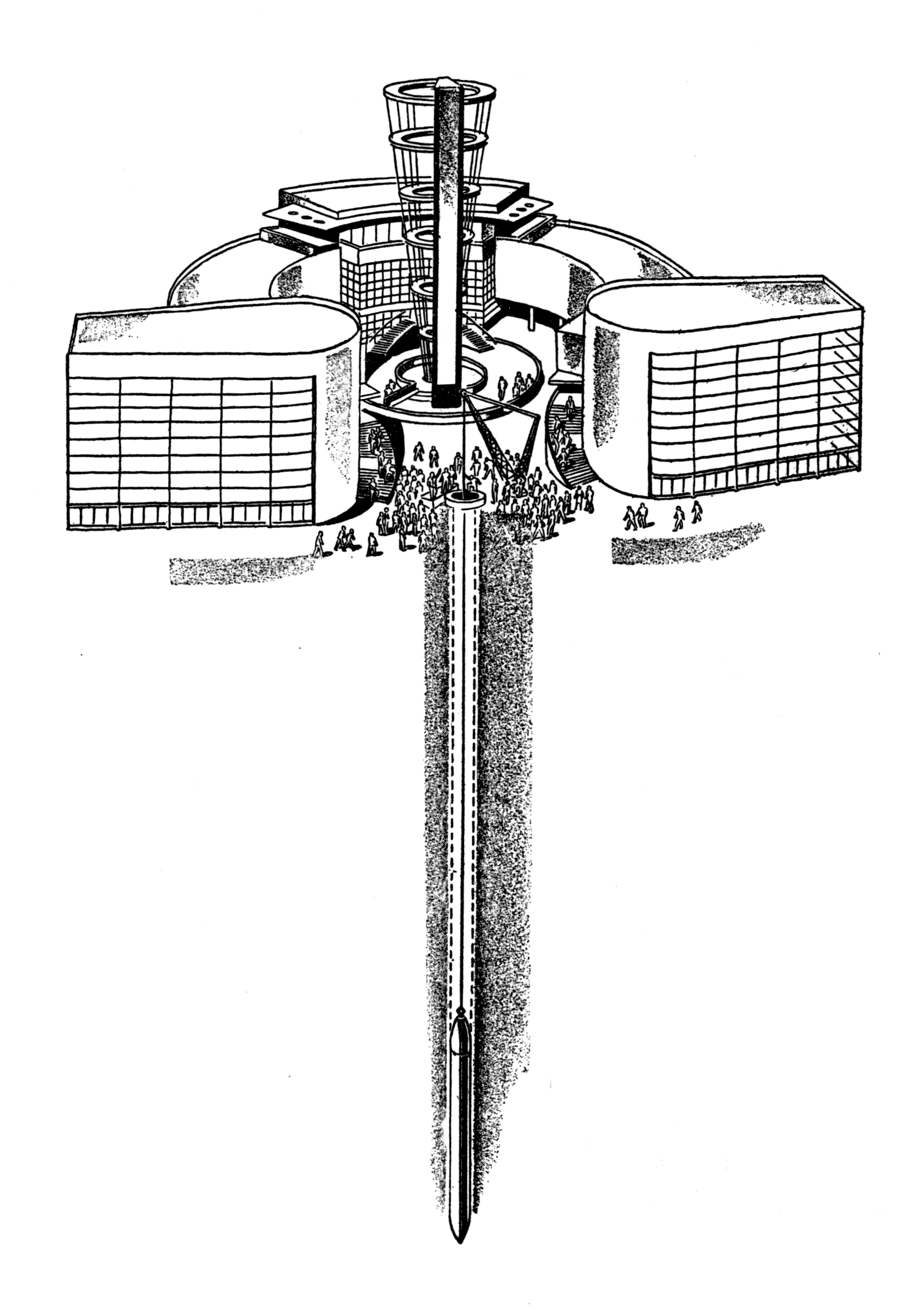
1939 Westinghouse exhibit

Time Capsule I was lowered at noon on September 23, 1938, the precise moment of the Autumnal Equinox. The latitude and longitude coordinates of its burying place, as determined by the U.S. National Geodetic Survey, was recorded in the Book of Record as 40°44′34.09″N 73°50′43.84″W within 1 inch (2.5 cm). The coordinates lead to The Westinghouse Time Capsule. The time capsule will likely move vertically or horizontally for geological reasons, so an alternate electromagnetic field method was provided. This method involves constructing a loop of wire 10 feet (3.0 m) in diameter and putting an alternating current (between 1,000 and 5,000 hertz) through it with a power of at least 200 watts. A secondary loop of wire, about 1 foot (0.30 m) in diameter, will detect a "distortion field", thus indicating the exact location of the two metal alloy time capsules, assuming no other large metal objects are in the vicinity.

At the close of the 1965 World's Fair, a seven-ton "permanent sentinel" granite monument, made by the Rock of Ages Corporation, was installed. The 50-foot-long (15 m) shaft was filled using pitch, concrete and earth, and the monument placed to mark the position where the two time capsules are buried.

Flushing Meadows is approximately 7 feet (2.1 m) above sea level. The park is extremely vulnerable to flooding because of its topography and because of sea level rise caused by global warming. Climate scientists had predicted that parts of the park would be flooded regularly by the 2050s and that the entire park could be underwater by the 2080s.

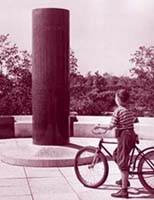
1938

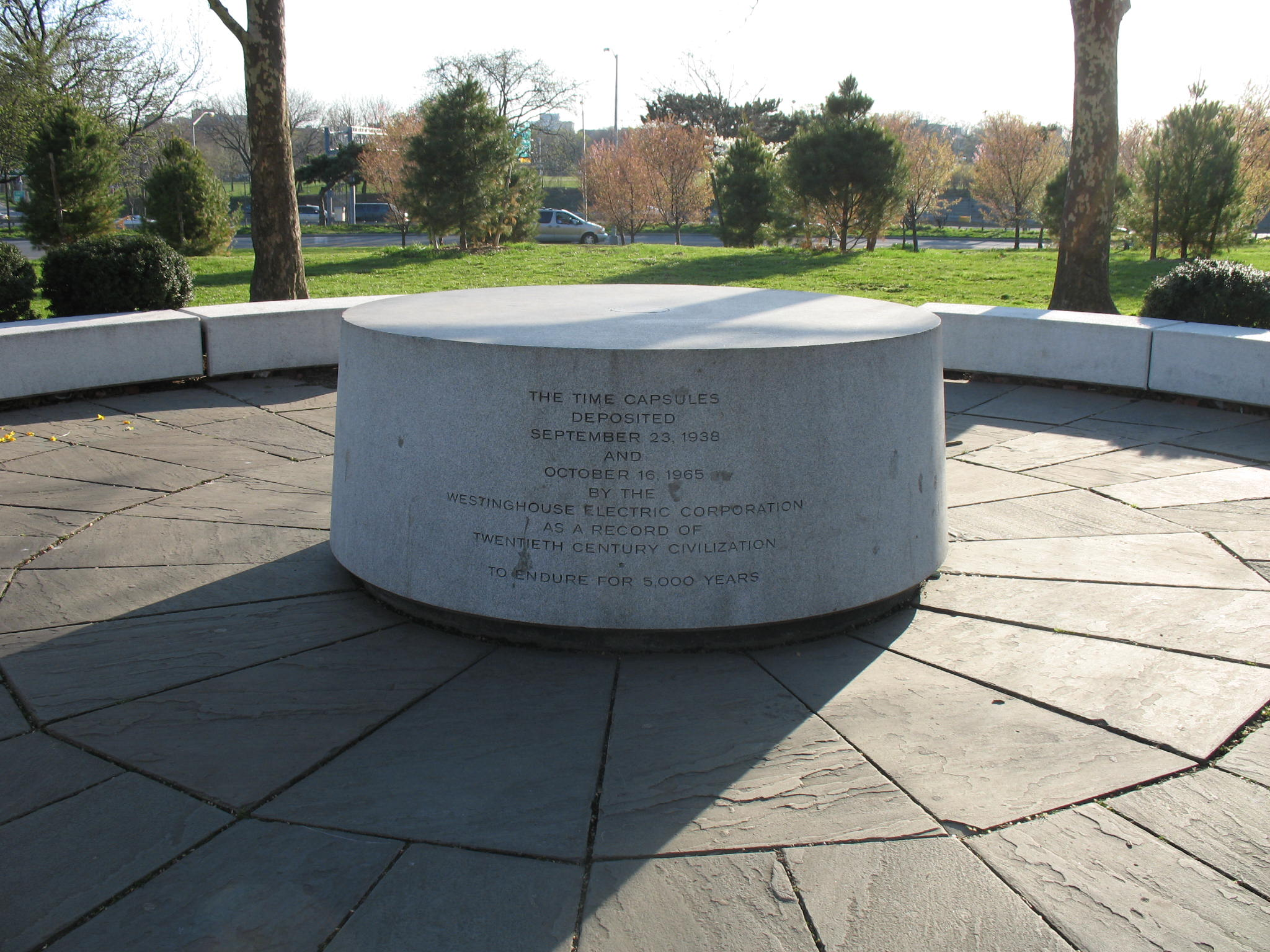

== Messages ==
The Book of Record, a copy of which was microfilmed and put inside Time Capsule I, contains written messages from three important men of the time:

Albert Einstein's message,

Our time is rich in inventive minds, the inventions of which could facilitate our lives considerably. We are crossing the seas by power and utilise power also in order to relieve humanity from all tiring muscular work. We have learned to fly and we are able to send messages and news without any difficulty over the entire world through electric waves. However, the production and distribution of commodities is entirely unorganised so that everybody must live in fear of being eliminated from the economic cycle, in this way suffering for the want of everything. Further more, people living in different countries kill each other at irregular time intervals, so that also for this reason any one who thinks about the future must live in fear and terror. This is due to the fact that the intelligence and character of the masses are incomparably lower than the intelligence and character of the few who produce some thing valuable for the community. I trust that posterity will read these statements with a feeling of proud and justified superiority.

Robert Andrews Millikan's message,

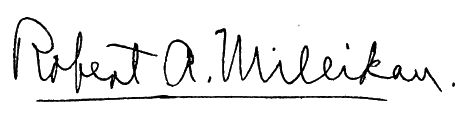

At this moment, August 22, 1938, the principles of representative ballot government, such as are represented by the governments of the Anglo-Saxon, French, and Scandinavian countries, are in deadly conflict with the principles of despotism, which up to two centuries ago had controlled the destiny of man throughout practically the whole of recorded history. If the rational, scientific, progressive principles win out in this struggle there is a possibility of a warless, golden age ahead for mankind. If the reactionary principles of despotism triumph now and in the future, the future history of mankind will repeat the sad story of war and oppression as in the past.

Thomas Mann's message,

We know now that the idea of the future as a "better world" was a fallacy of the doctrine of progress. The hopes we center on you, citizens of the future, are in no way exaggerated. In broad outline, you will actually resemble us very much as we resemble those who lived a thousand, or five thousand, years ago. Among you too the spirit will fare badly. It should never fare too well on this earth, otherwise men would need it no longer. That optimistic conception of the future is a projection into time of an endeavor which does not belong to the temporal world, the endeavor on the part of man to approximate to his idea of himself, the humanization of man. What we, in this year of Our Lord 1938, understand by the term "culture" a notion held in small esteem today by certain nations of the western world is simply this endeavor. What we call the spirit is identical with it, too. Brothers of the future, united with us in the spirit and in this endeavor, we send our greetings.

The term "time capsule" was coined by Pendray for the 1939 World's Fair Westinghouse exhibit in New York City for objects of the time placed in a tube for people of the future.

== Inscription on the time capsules ==
The exterior of the 1938 time capsule is die-stamped with this message to anyone who might stumble upon it prior to the scheduled opening year of 6939.

TIME CAPSULE OF CUPALOY, DEPOSITED ON THE SITE OF THE NEW YORK WORLD'S FAIR ON SEPTEMBER 23, 1938,
BY THE WESTINGHOUSE ELECTRIC & MANUFACTURING COMPANY. IF ANYONE SHOULD COME UPON THIS CAPSULE
BEFORE THE YEAR A. D. 6939 LET HIM NOT WANTONLY DISTURB IT, FOR TO DO SO WOULD BE TO DEPRIVE THE
PEOPLE OF THAT ERA OF THE LEGACY HERE LEFT THEM. CHERISH IT THEREFORE IN A SAFE PLACE.

The 1965 time capsule exterior has no message. An exact duplicate of the capsule's articles resides at the Heinz History Center beside a replica capsule of Time Capsule I.

== Future languages ==
The Book of Record requests that its contents be translated into new languages as they develop. It contains a key with illustrations devised by Dr. John P. Harrington of the Smithsonian Institution to help future archaeologists with the English language, since it was felt that existing languages could be lost. It also includes an illustration showing exactly where each of the 33 sounds of 1938 English are formed in the oral cavity in what Dr. Harrington refers to as a "mouth map."

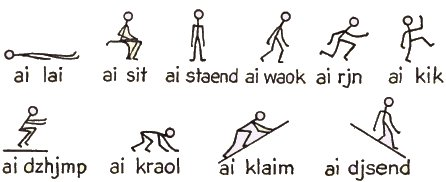
Illustration of 1938 English to people of 70th century

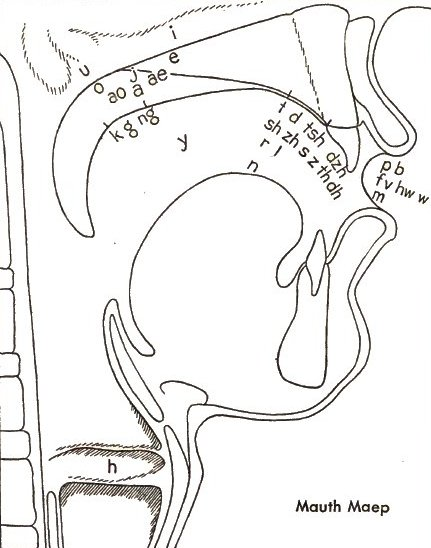
Mouth Map

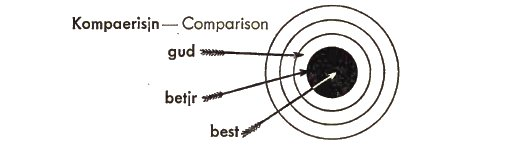
1938 English to people of the 70th century showing comparisons

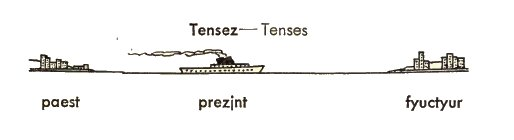
1938 English to people of the 70th century showing grammatical tenses

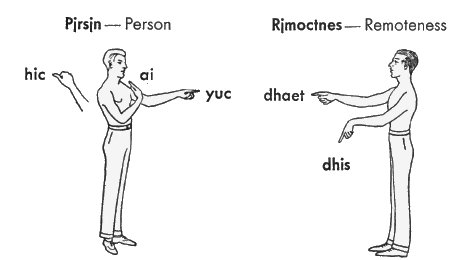
1938 English to people of the 70th century showing relationships

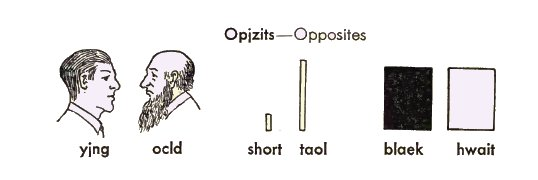
1938 English to people of the 70th century showing opposites

== See also ==
- KEO
- Expo '70
- 7th millennium
- Crypt of Civilization
- List of time capsules
- George Edward Pendray
- International Time Capsule Society

== Sources ==
- Jarvis, William E. (2015). Time Capsules. New York City: McFarland Incorporated Publishers. ISBN 9780786480951.
- Westinghouse, Electric and Manufacturing Company (1938). The Book of Record of the Time Capsule of Cupaloy. New York City: Westinghouse Electric & Manufacturing Company.
- Westinghouse, Electric and Manufacturing Company (1939). The Story of Westinghouse Time Capsule of Cupaloy. New York City: Westinghouse Electric & Manufacturing Company.
