= Kumzhensky memorial =

Military memorial in Rostov, Russia

- Russian: Кумженский мемориал
- Interactive map of Kumzhensky memorial
- Location: Rostov-on-Don, Russia
- Designer: architect R. Muradyan, sculptors B. Lapko and E. Lapko
- Opening date: 1983
- Dedicated to: in memory of the died fighters of the Red Army, liberating Rostov-on-Don in 1941 and 1943

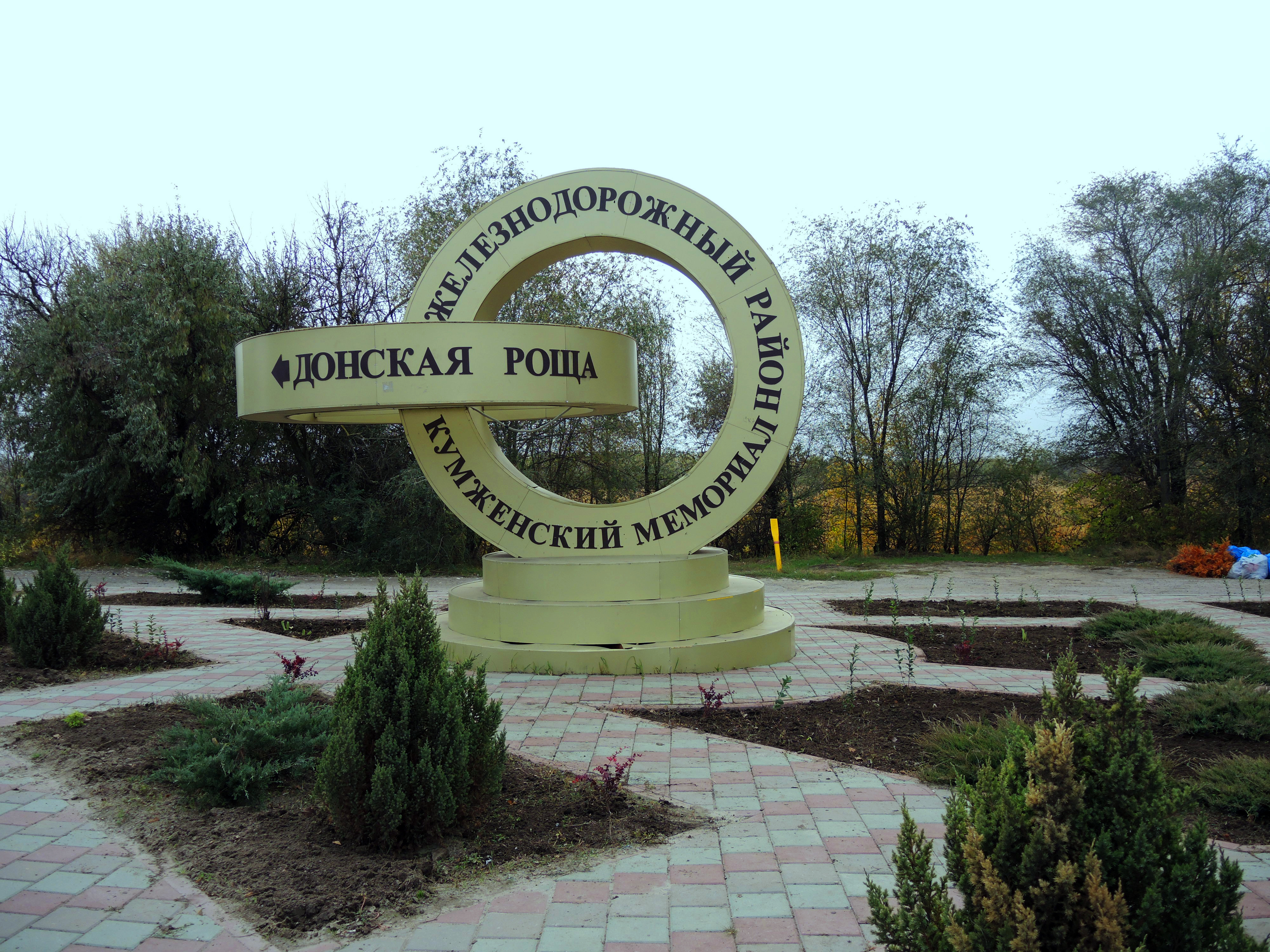
Начало комплекса

The Kumzhensky memorial (The memorial complex "Kumzhensky Grove"; Russian: Кумженский мемориал (Мемориальный комплекс «Кумженская роща»)) is a memorial complex in Zheleznodorozhny district of Rostov-on-Don. It is located in the western part of the city in the Kumzhensky park on a peninsula formed by the convergence of the Don and the Myortvy Donets river. The memorial was erected in 1983 to commemorate the dead fighters of the Red Army who liberated Rostov-on-Don in 1941 and 1943 during the Second World War. The complex includes several memorials and a mass grave. The Kumzhensky memorial is recognized as a regional cultural heritage site.

== Background ==
Bloody battles were fought during WWII on what is now the site of Kumzhensky Park. The memorial complex "Kumzhenskaya Grove" was built in 1983 in memory of the soldiers who died in those battles. It was designed and executed by architect R. Muradyan and sculptors B. Lapko and E. Lapko. The memorial site hosts annual memorial services honoring the dead soldiers of the Soviet Army. Soldiers' remains found by Rostov search groups are interred in a mass grave on the site.

== Description ==
Set along the park's main avenue, the Kumzhensky memorial includes five pylons, four stelae of Glory, a "Storm" monument, and memorial plaques engraved with the names of the combat units that participated in the battles for Rostov.

The central object of the Kumzhensky memorial is the "Storm" monument. A sculpture depicting a group of soldiers on the attack sits atop a granite plinth. Above them rises an 18-meter (59 ft) metal spire indicating the direction of the Soviet Army's primary offensive.

The sculptural group depicts the real faces of the liberators of the city: a woman with a gun in her hands represents Alexandra Nozadze, a native of Abkhazia and the political leader of a company of the 1151st regiment of the 343rd rifle division of the 56th army; next to her is the commander of the company, Karelian Lieutenant Vladimir Milovidov, whom Nozadze succeeded; and Second Lieutenant Alexey Filippov, the commander of a machine-gun company.

== History ==
Initially, the memorial complex was a museum, but in 2000 a restaurant was opened in the former museum building. In subsequent years, various journalists and public figures noted that the memorial was suffering from a lack of upkeep and repair. Trash had accumulated on the memorial grounds. In April 2012, non-governmental organizations in Rostov cleaned the area around the memorial complex, filling over 100 garbage bags with trash. At that time its architect, Ruben Muradyan, said "Today the memorial is fully realized - I see it. In recent years, thanks to our search teams, the heroes of the war have been buried in a common grave. There are new memorial plaques with the names of the heroes."

In 2015, in preparation for the 70th anniversary of the Allied victory in WWII, the memorial complex was renovated.
