= Crypt of Civilization =

Time capsule in Georgia, United States

Coordinates: 33.87465°N 84.33136°W

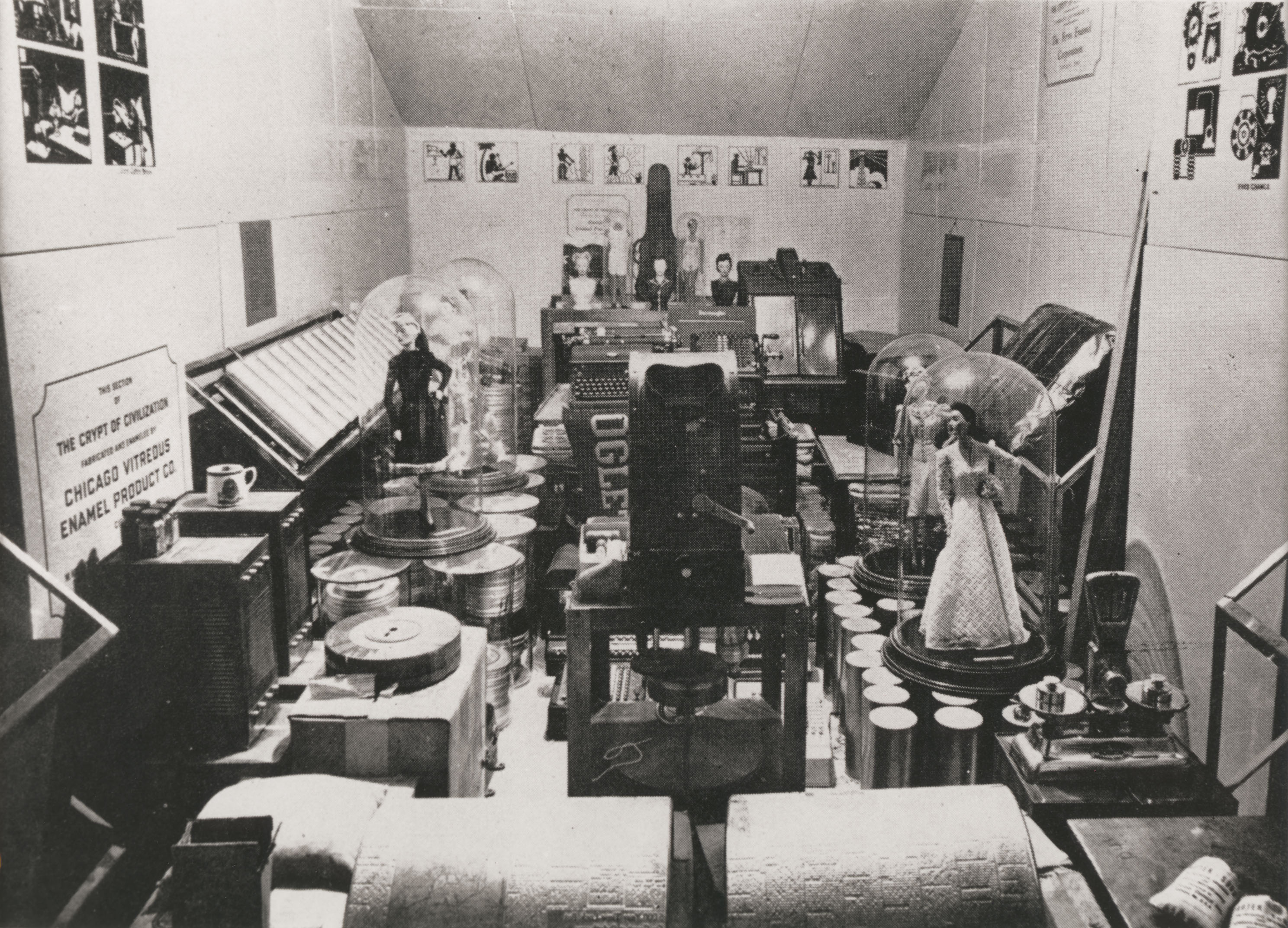
Crypt of Civilization interior, photographed prior to sealing

The Crypt of Civilization is an impenetrable, airtight, room-sized time capsule, built between 1936 and 1940, at Oglethorpe University in Brookhaven, Georgia. The 2,000-cubic-foot (57 m^{3}) repository is meant not to be opened before 8113 AD. It contains numerous artifacts and sound recordings that illustrate civilization and human development to the 20th century. Classic literature and religious texts were also deposited, as well as items showing the extent of scientific progress to 1939.

Thornwell Jacobs, the initiator of the project, was inspired by the opening of Egyptian pyramids and wanted to create a repository of everyday 1930s objects and a record of human knowledge over the preceding 6,000 years. The Guinness Book of Records declared the Crypt to be the first genuine attempt to permanently preserve a record of 20th century culture for people of thousands of years into the future.

== Beginnings ==
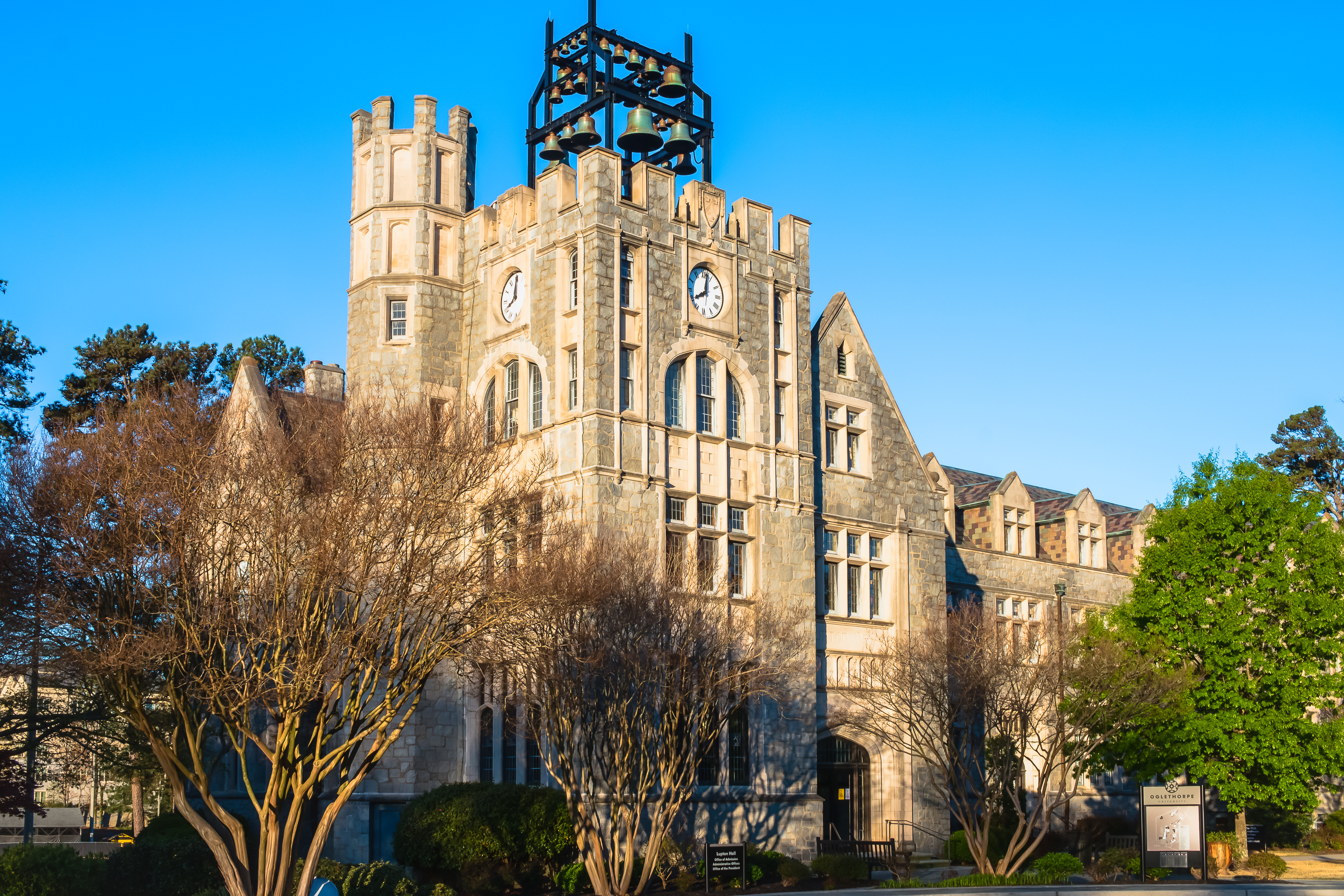
Oglethorpe University – location of the Crypt is in the basement

Thornwell Jacobs (1877–1956), President of Oglethorpe University from 1915 to 1944, is considered the father of modern time capsules by historian Paul Stephen Hudson. Jacobs was engaged in research in the 1920s for one of his books when he was astounded by the meager amount of detailed information available about ancient Egyptian life. He realized that practically all the accumulated knowledge we had of the civilization was based on two incomplete sources. One being the items found in tombs of the Pharaohs of Egypt and the kings of Sumeria and Babylonia. The second was from rock inscriptions and tablets found in ancient Assyria. He determined that while the ancient items found gave some degree of life events from thousands of years ago there were no complete and accurate records on any single generation of how people lived.

Jacobs' vision was to make available to some civilization far in the future a kind of latter-day Egyptian style tomb of a complete cross section record of physical and visual items showing the life and traditions that people had developed to the time of the closing of the crypt. In 1935, he discussed this idea with the editor of Scientific American, Orson Munn, and he promised to use the magazine to publicize the project. In November 1936 an article was published describing the time capsule project. Jacobs sought the help of scientist Thomas K. Peters and the project was started in August 1937. By June 1940 they had collected all the items they thought represented human life on earth of the previous 6000 years. Jacobs calculated that 6,177 years had passed since the start of the Egyptian calendar (4241 BC) and proposed the creation of a Crypt of Civilization to be opened in 8113 CE after another 6,177 years.

The Crypt of Civilization was constructed in the swimming pool in the basement of the Phoebe Hearst Hall at Oglethorpe University. The swimming pool was modified into an airtight chamber, measuring 20 ft (6.1 m) long, 10 ft (3.0 m) high and 10 ft (3.0 m) wide, which was remodeled between 1937 and 1940. It sits on a bedrock floor and has a stone roof 7 ft (2.1 m) thick. The walls are lined with plates of enamel, secured in place with pitch. The stainless steel doorway was welded permanently closed after the oxygen had been removed and replaced with inert nitrogen. Peters supervised construction and served as the Crypt's archivist who would represent the current civilization. The project was financed by industrialists and philanthropists. The crypt was deeded to the United States government.

== Contents ==
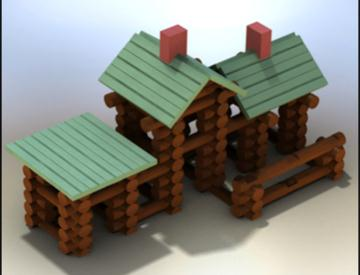
Typical example of Lincoln Logs placed in crypt

The Bureau of Standards was consulted on the design of the Crypt and advised how artifacts should be stored. The chamber resembles a room of an ancient Egyptian pyramid with artifacts placed on shelves and the floor. Many items are stored in stainless steel holders, lined with glass and filled with an inert gas to prevent aging, a concept later carried over to the Westinghouse Time Capsules. The walls are painted with pictographs by George L. Carlson that show the history of intelligence and human development. There is a small windmill inside the vault that will make electricity to operate the electrical items buried in the time capsule.

Many of the artifacts were donated and contributions were received from the King of Sweden Gustav V and Eastman Kodak. Suggestions for items that were accepted for the chamber included a mechanical pencil, a fountain pen and a can opener. Other artifacts deposited were seed samples, dental floss, a woman's purse with typical contents, some Artie Shaw records, an electric toaster, a pacifier, a bottle of Budweiser beer encapsulated in special material for preservation, a manual typewriter, an electronic radio, a store cash register, an office adding machine, and an electric sewing machine. Children's toys were deposited as well, including Lincoln Logs, a plastic Donald Duck, a miniature plastic statue of the Lone Ranger, and a cloth and wooden black doll. Also placed in the crypt were miniature reproductions of some of the most famous sculptures ever made.

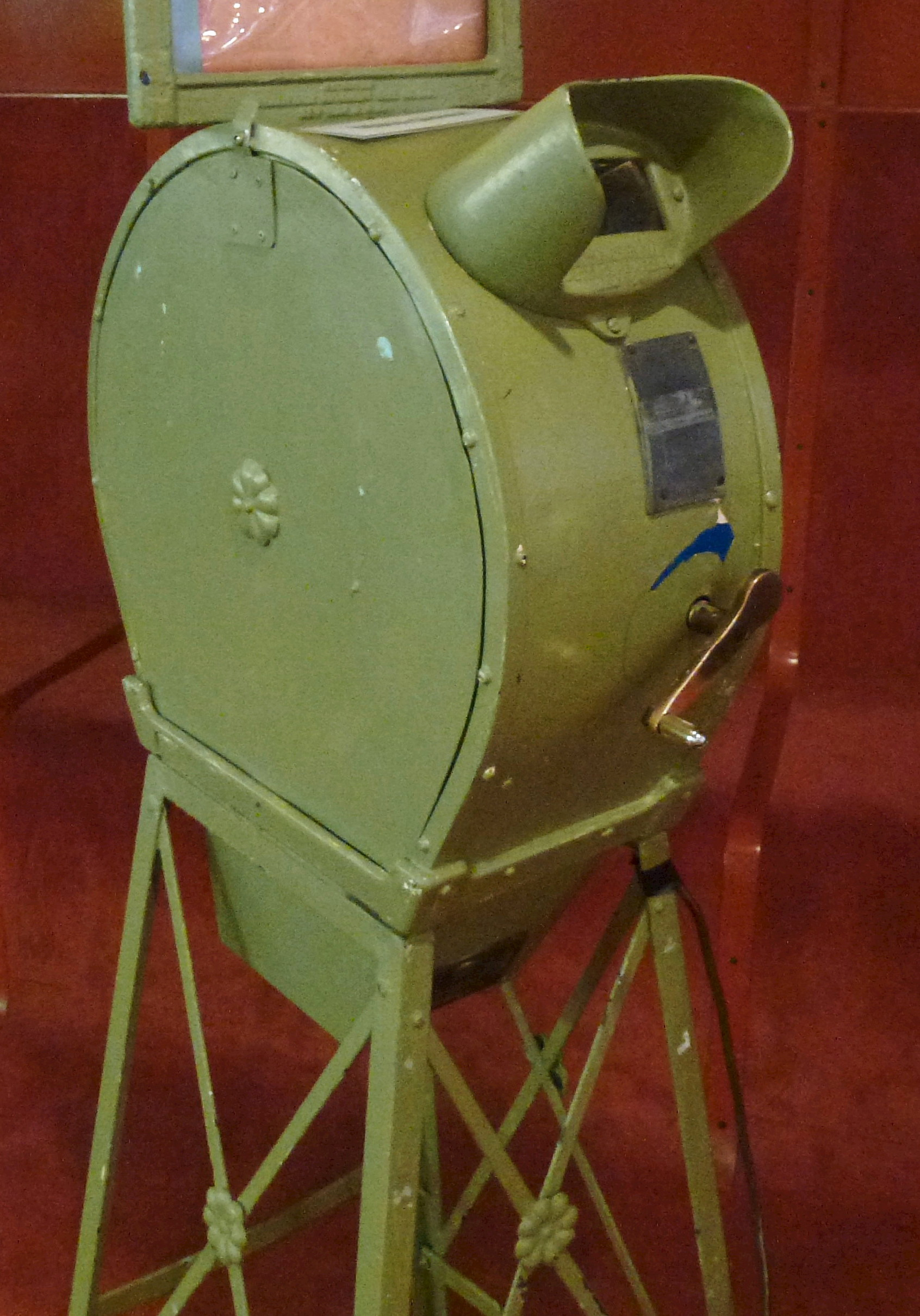
Hand operated Mutoscope was converted into translator

Airtight canisters containing cellulose acetate film were also placed into the chamber. These microfilms contain more than 800 standard books of literature (over 600,000 pages), including the Christian Bible, the Quran, Homer's Iliad, and Dante's Divine Comedy. An original manuscript Gone With the Wind film was donated by movie producer David O. Selznick. AMORC was asked by Peters to send from their archives manuscripts of their philosophy to be deposited inside the Crypt time vault with the other artifacts that are to be seen by those of 8113 CE when the time capsule reopens. Collected also for the time treasure was film on Ohio's industrial and historical scenes including travelogues and agricultural scenes of the state. There are also glass bell jars that hold less-than life-size models of men and women dressed in 1930s clothing.

The crypt contains voice recordings of leaders from the 1930s, including Adolf Hitler, Joseph Stalin, Franklin D. Roosevelt, and Benito Mussolini. The sounds of Popeye the Sailor Man and a professional pig caller were stored inside the crypt. Peters, the archivist, placed electric microfilm readers and picture projectors in the chamber to allow future generations to view and listen to the recordings. He also provided a windmill to generate electricity to run the devices, as well as a magnifier for the microfilm records, if electricity were not in general use by the 82nd century. Engraved steel panels of the Atlanta Journal newspaper showing reports from the first year of World War II, were also placed in the crypt.

An array of contemporary scientific instruments were gathered for the crypt such as an altimeter and a barometer, as well as common appliances like a telephone and a television. Peters also left behind a device of his innovation called a "Language Integrator", a modified Mutoscope that was a hand-operated movie projector with sound that would teach English to the future generation that came upon the crypt. This was a type of Rosetta Stone and another concept carried forward to the Westinghouse Time Capsules. Peters also delivered a film he had made about the crypt entitled The Stream of Knowledge that was published in 1938. Jacobs left a written note for those opening the crypt in 8113 CE, in which he hoped for future efforts in preservation. He pointed out that the world had been engaged in scientifically preserving the human civilization customs and culture for future generations, and in this crypt it had been presented to these people.

== Promotion ==
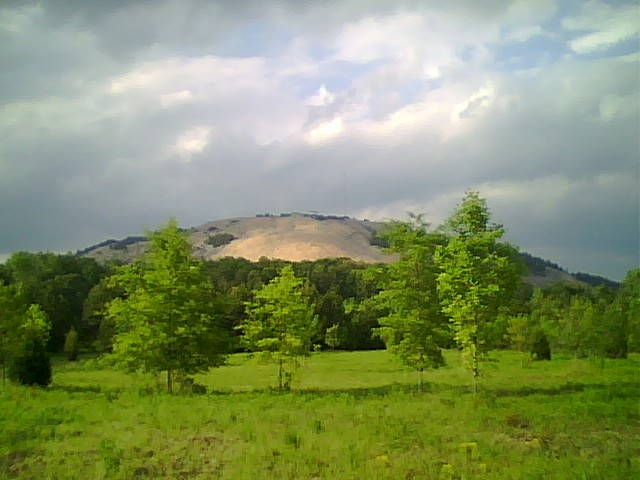
Stone Mountain in US state of Georgia

In 1937, Jacobs spoke on the National Broadcasting Company in New York to promote the Crypt on nationwide radio. A dedication ceremony at the Oglethorpe University campus took place in May 1938, led by David Sarnoff of Radio Corporation of America and the Paramount newsreels of the occasion were later placed in the crypt. Metal cards were sold to the public by the university for one dollar, which would permit a future descendant of the contributor to attend the reentering of the crypt at noon on Thursday, May 28, 8113. (Note: In the Gregorian calendar May 28, 8113 will be a Sunday. Note that the Georgian calendar has an error of one day every 3030 years.) The location of this repository of civilization items was a concern of the far future civilization being able to know of it and its whereabouts so a system was devised. Directions to the Crypt of Civilization in the state of Georgia in southeastern United States was written in seven Asiatic and seven European languages and deposited in various type libraries all over the world. The information provided told of its contents and showed its location in relation to reference points like Stone Mountain.

Jacobs and Peters permanently closed off the crypt in a ceremony that was announced in a newscast by Atlanta's WSB radio May 25, 1940. Notable figures present at the ceremony were Dr. Amos Ettinger, William B. Hartsfield, Dr. M. D. Collins, Ivan Allen, Jr., politician E. D. Rivers, postmaster James Farley and Pulitzer Prize winner Clark Howell. The door was welded shut, and a plaque was fused to it with a message to the people of 8113 CE from Jacobs. In 1990, Guinness World Records wrote that the vault was the first genuine attempt that successfully preserved permanently a record of 20th-century cultural objects for any future inhabitants of Earth or visitors that may come to the unoccupied planet.

== Legacy ==
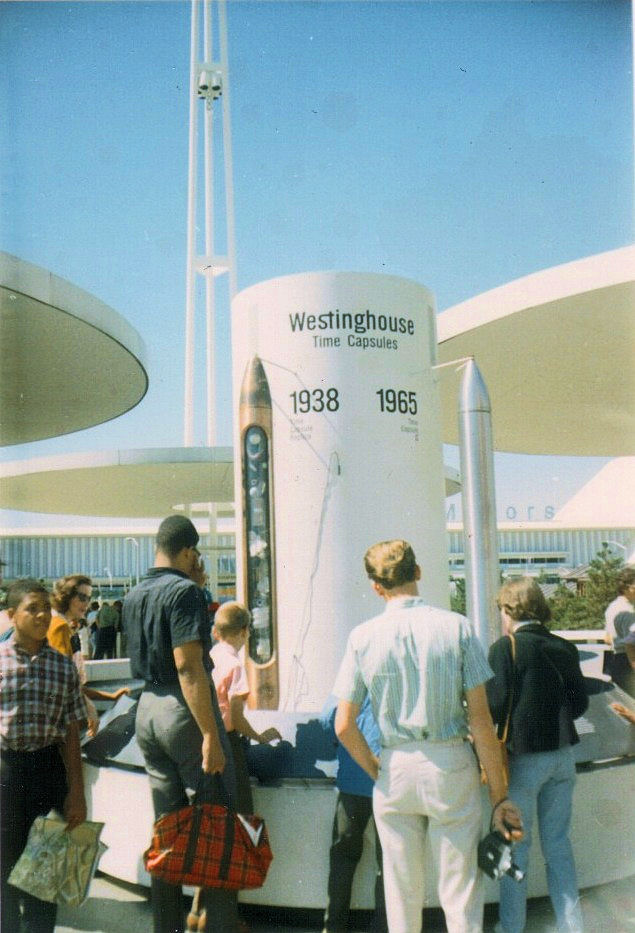
Westinghouse time capsule exhibit

The Crypt of Civilization intrigued America and was replicated by many others. George Edward Pendray, a public relations executive in the mid-1930s, created the Westinghouse time capsule for a public ceremony for the 1939–40 New York World's Fair, to raise awareness of his company's repository vault. The rocket-shaped vessel, with a 7-foot-long (2.1 m) exterior made from the metal alloy cupaloy, contained a Pyrex inner tube in which articles were placed. Pendray's design was originally called a "time bomb", but the name was later changed to avoid an association with warfare. Pendray chose the name "time capsule" as it encapsulated within a container man-made objects and was intended to be opened in 61 centuries. A second capsule was created by Westinghouse for the 1964 New York World's Fair and an exhibit was set up to show the contents and history of the time capsules. Both these capsules are intended to be available to the people of 6939 CE only and are not to be opened before then.

The Crypt of Civilization has been published or broadcast by the media since its inception, including the Associated Press, ABC, NBC, CNN, NPR, the Atlanta Journal Constitution, and the New York Times newspaper. After the sealing ceremony in 1940, media organizations continued to re-visit the crypt in news stories every decade. The International Time Capsule Society, an international society club for recording the locations and contents of time capsules worldwide, was founded at Oglethorpe University on the fiftieth anniversary (1990) of the official closing of the vault. The Crypt of Civilization regained prominence from 1999 to 2001 as a result of the Millennium celebrations. The Crypt was featured in an episode of Life After People: The Series on the History Channel. The story of the Crypt was published in major newspapers all around the world.

Peters observed that the fact of such a project designed for people that would not even be born for more than six millennia is the built-in belief that the human race will still exist and that therefore there is a need for historical preservation. He further shows that there is even a hint of reincarnation by the fact that newspaper reporter and historian Frank G. Menke asked the movie star singer Bing Crosby to be Master of Ceremonies at the opening of the crypt in 8113 CE. Crosby responded to this by saying he would be glad to do that as long as his filming schedule at the time would allow it.

== See also ==
- Georgia Guidestones
- Time capsule
- List of time capsules

== Sources ==
- Dean, Norman L. (2010). The Man Behind the Bottle. Norman L. Dean. ISBN 9781450054041.
- Peters, T.K. (1940). The Story of the Crypt of Civilization. Atlanta, Georgia: Oglethorpe University Press. OCLC 1927147. "(page 20) "Thanks for your little tip handling the Master of Ceremnonies job in 8113 A.D. My appearance will be contingent upon my motion picture schedule, however, if I am free at the time, I shall be very happy to act as Master of Ceremonies at good old Oglethorpe University.""
- Westinghouse, Electric and Manufacturing Company (1938). The book record of time capsule of cupaloy. New York City: Westinghouse Electric & Manufacturing Company.
- Seibert, Patricia (2002). We Were Here. Millbrook Press. ISBN 9780761304234.
