= International Time Capsule Society =

Coordinates: 33.87581°N 84.33490°W

Oglethorpe University

The International Time Capsule Society (ITCS) is an organization devoted to the subject of time capsules. Founded in 1990 at Oglethorpe University in Brookhaven, Georgia, United States (following the lead of a precursor group established in 1937), the ITCS tracks the creation and status of time capsules in countries around the world.

== See also ==
- List of time capsules
- Timeline of time capsules
- Westinghouse Time Capsules
- NotForgotten Digital Preservation Library
