= Peter Kazansky =

Physicist specialising in optoelectronics

- Education: Moscow State University (MSc, 1979); General Physics Institute (PhD, 1985)
- Known for: 5D optical data storage
- Awards: Lenin Komsomol Prize (1989); Fellow of the Optical Society of America (2007)
- Scientific career
- Fields: Physics, optics, photonics
- Workplaces: SPhotonix; University of Southampton; D. Mendeleev University of Chemical Technology
- Doctoral advisor: Alexander Prokhorov

Peter G. Kazansky is a physicist who was a professor at the Optoelectronics Research Centre (ORC) of the University of Southampton, where he led the Physical Optics research group. His work covered laser–matter interaction, nonlinear optics, photonic materials and optical data storage. He is known as one of the inventors of 5D optical data storage, a method of recording digital data in nanostructured fused silica that has been nicknamed the "Superman memory crystal" in the press. In 2024 he co-founded SPhotonix, a company commercialising the technology, and serves as its chief scientific officer.

== Early life and education ==
Kazansky received an MSc in physics from Moscow State University in 1979 and a PhD from the General Physics Institute (GPI) in Moscow in 1985, supervised by the Nobel laureate Alexander Prokhorov. He was awarded the Lenin Komsomol Prize in 1989 for work on the circular photogalvanic effect in crystals.

Between 1989 and 1993 he led a group at the GPI that accounted for light-induced frequency doubling in media with inversion symmetry.

== Academic career ==
Kazansky joined the Optoelectronics Research Centre at the University of Southampton in 1992 and became a professor there in 2001, leading the Physical Optics group.

He served as a vice-chair of TC-20, the Technical Committee on Glasses for Optoelectronics of the International Commission on Glass, until 2013. From 2014 he was the leading scientist of the International Centre of Laser Technologies at the D. Mendeleev University of Chemical Technology in Moscow, a centre established under the Russian government's "megagrant" programme for a project that ran until 2018.

== Research ==
=== Nonlinear optics in glass and optical fibre ===
Kazansky's early work concerned second-order optical nonlinearity in glass, which the material's inversion symmetry normally forbids. With Valerio Pruneri he reported frequency doubling of picosecond pulses in periodically poled D-shape silica fibre in 1997, an all-fibre demonstration of quasi-phase-matched second-harmonic generation.

=== Ultrafast laser nanostructuring ===
While collaborating with Kazuyuki Hirao's group in Japan in 1999, Kazansky observed anomalous anisotropic light scattering in germanium-doped silica that had been irradiated with femtosecond laser pulses. He later described the observation as light scattering "in a way that seemed to defy the laws of physics". The effect was traced to self-organised sub-wavelength gratings formed inside the glass, reported in Physical Review Letters in 2003.

=== 5D optical data storage ===
The nanogratings encode information in the three spatial coordinates of each written voxel and additionally in the orientation and strength of the induced birefringence, giving five parameters – hence "5D". Kazansky's group demonstrated recording and retrieval of a 300 kb text file in fused quartz in 2013 and published lifetime measurements in Physical Review Letters in 2014.

Guinness World Records lists the medium as the "most durable digital storage medium", naming Jingyu Zhang, Martynas Beresna, Peter G. Kazansky and Mindaugas Gecevicius as the record holders and dating it to the research published on 23 January 2014. The entry gives an extrapolated stability of 300 quintillion years at room temperature, 13.8 billion years at 190 °C, and a capacity of 360 TB per disc.

In February 2016 the group announced that it had recorded the Universal Declaration of Human Rights, Newton's Opticks, Magna Carta and the King James Bible onto 5D discs. Reporting on the announcement popularised the nickname "Superman memory crystal", after the memory crystals of the Superman films.

=== S-waveplate ===
In 2011 Kazansky's group used femtosecond laser writing to fabricate a radially polarised optical vortex converter, a space-variant polarisation element that turns linearly polarised light into radially or azimuthally polarised optical vortices. It was subsequently marketed as the S-waveplate. The element has since been used inside high-power laser cavities, including an actively Q-switched radially polarised Ho:YAG laser.

=== Project Silica ===
Microsoft sponsored Kazansky's Southampton group between 2017 and 2019 as part of Project Silica, a Microsoft Research Cambridge effort to develop glass storage for cloud archives. Kazansky has said that the partners "proved the core principle together, after which they continued developing the technology independently", and that Microsoft "licensed some elements" of the Southampton research. At Microsoft's Ignite conference in November 2019 the project demonstrated a 143-minute Warner Bros. film, Superman, stored on a 75 × 75 × 2 mm piece of silica glass holding 75.6 GB of data plus error-redundancy codes. The University of Southampton, which describes Kazansky as the technology's inventor and as its own principal investigator on the project, said that ORC expertise had contributed to a hundredfold increase in the system's writing speed.

=== Archival demonstrations ===
A quartz disc carrying Isaac Asimov's Foundation trilogy, written with the Southampton technology for the Arch Mission Foundation, was launched aboard the first Falcon Heavy flight in February 2018 inside Elon Musk's Tesla Roadster. A 5D crystal holding the Universal Declaration of Human Rights was exhibited at the Victoria and Albert Museum show The Future Starts Here the same year.

In September 2024 Kazansky's team announced that it had inscribed the roughly three-billion-character human genome onto a coin-sized 5D crystal, which was deposited in the Memory of Mankind archive in a salt cave at Hallstatt, Austria. The deep sequencing was carried out with Helixwork Technologies. He told The Register that a task which had taken half a year to write a decade earlier could by then be completed in about an hour.

=== Quantum information ===
Kazansky was a co-author of a 2021 report, led from the University of Toronto and with the Dianov Fiber Optics Research Centre in Moscow, of a broadband fibre-based source of polarisation-entangled photon pairs in the telecom O-band, based on periodically poled silica fibre.

== SPhotonix ==
In 2024 Kazansky co-founded SPhotonix with his son Ilya Kazansky to commercialise 5D glass nanostructuring, which the company markets as FemtoEtch. Peter Kazansky is chief scientific officer and Ilya Kazansky is chief executive. In November 2025 the company announced a $4.5 million pre-seed round led by Creator Fund and XTX Ventures. Kazansky has said that its read-out speed is about 30 MB/s and that he expects reading and writing speeds of 500 MB/s within three to five years.

== Reception ==
Commentators have questioned how quickly glass storage can be adopted. Srinivasan Keshav, professor of computer science at the University of Cambridge, has said that the technology is not backwards compatible with existing infrastructure, creating "enormous adoption barriers", and Thomas Heinis, a professor in data management at Imperial College London, has raised the problem of whether suitable reading equipment will still exist in the distant future. Writing in Science in 2026, Robert F. Service described Kazansky as "an optoelectronics expert at the University of Southampton who helped pioneer the field of glass data storage".

== Selected publications ==
- Kazansky, P. G.; Inouye, H.; Mitsuyu, T.; Miura, K.; Qiu, J.; Hirao, K.; Starrost, F. (1999). "Anomalous anisotropic light scattering in Ge-doped silica glass". Physical Review Letters. 82 (10): 2199–2202. Bibcode:1999PhRvL..82.2199K. doi:10.1103/PhysRevLett.82.2199.
- Shimotsuma, Y.; Kazansky, P. G.; Qiu, J.; Hirao, K. (2003). "Self-organized nanogratings in glass irradiated by ultrashort light pulses". Physical Review Letters. 91 (24) 247405. Bibcode:2003PhRvL..91x7405S. doi:10.1103/PhysRevLett.91.247405. hdl:2433/39921. PMID 14683157.
- Beresna, M.; Gecevicius, M.; Kazansky, P. G.; Gertus, T. (2011). "Radially polarized optical vortex converter created by femtosecond laser nanostructuring of glass". Applied Physics Letters. 98 (20): 201101. Bibcode:2011ApPhL..98t1101B. doi:10.1063/1.3590716.
- Zhang, J.; Gecevicius, M.; Beresna, M.; Kazansky, P. G. (2014). "Seemingly unlimited lifetime data storage in nanostructured glass". Physical Review Letters. 112 (3) 033901. Bibcode:2014PhRvL.112c3901Z. doi:10.1103/PhysRevLett.112.033901. PMID 24484138.
- Pruneri, V.; Kazansky, P. G. (1997). "Frequency doubling of picosecond pulses in periodically poled D-shape silica fibre". Electronics Letters. 33 (4): 318–319. Bibcode:1997ElL....33..318P. doi:10.1049/el:19970177.
- Chen, C.; Xu, C.; Riazi, A.; Zhu, E. Y.; Gladyshev, A. V.; Kazansky, P. G.; Qian, L. (2021). "Broadband fiber-based entangled photon-pair source at telecom O-band". Optics Letters. 46 (6): 1261–1264. arXiv:2102.12632. Bibcode:2021OptL...46.1261C. doi:10.1364/OL.415409. PMID 33720162.
