= Bridget Donahue =

American art dealer

- Born: Iowa City, Iowa, U.S.A
- Occupation: American art dealer
- Known for: Bridget Donahue Gallery
- Website: https://www.bridgetdonahue.nyc/

Bridget Donahue is an American gallerist and curator.

== Education ==
Donahue's studies include a B.A. in anthropology and M.A. in textiles. Her work with textiles led her to the art of Rosemarie Trockel, and in turn, led Ms. Donahue to a position at the Gladstone Gallery, which represents Trockel.

== Career ==
After the Gladstone Gallery, Donahue worked at the D’Amelio Terras Gallery before becoming a gallery director at Gavin Brown's Enterprise. In 2008, she co-founded the Brooklyn gallery space Cleopatra’s with three friends.

=== Bridget Donahue ===
In 2015, Donahue opened her eponymous gallery in Manhattan's Lower East Side, which made a number of “Best of 2015” lists from publications such as The New York Times and Art in America magazine. Bridget Donahue represents and shows contemporary artists including, as of 2019; Lisa Alvarado, Susan Cianciolo, Lynn Hershman Leeson, Satoshi Kojima, Monique Mouton, Sondra Perry, Jessi Reaves, John Russell, Olga Balema Martine Syms, and Mark Van Yetter. Two gallery artists were included in the 2017 Whitney Biennial: Jessi Reaves and Susan Cianciolo. Martine Syms and Olga Balema were included in the 2019 Whitney Biennial curated by Rujeko Hockley and Jane Panetta.
