= Knowledge ark =

Collection of knowledge in case of civilisational collapse

A knowledge ark (also known as a doomsday ark or doomsday vault) is a collection of knowledge preserved in such a way that future generations would have access to it if all other copies of it were lost.

Scenarios where access to information (such as the Internet) would become otherwise impossible could be described as existential risks or extinction-level events. A knowledge ark could take the form of a traditional library or a modern computer database. It could also be pictorial in nature, including photographs of important information, or diagrams of critical processes.

A knowledge ark would have to be resistant to the effects of natural or man-made disasters in order to be viable. Such an ark should include, but would not be limited to, information or material relevant to the survival and prosperity of human civilization.

Other types of knowledge arks might include genetic material, such as in a DNA bank. With the potential for widespread personal DNA sequencing becoming a reality, an individual might agree to store their genetic code in a digital or analog storage format which would enable later retrieval of that code. If a species was sequenced before extinction, its genome would still remain available for study.

== Examples ==
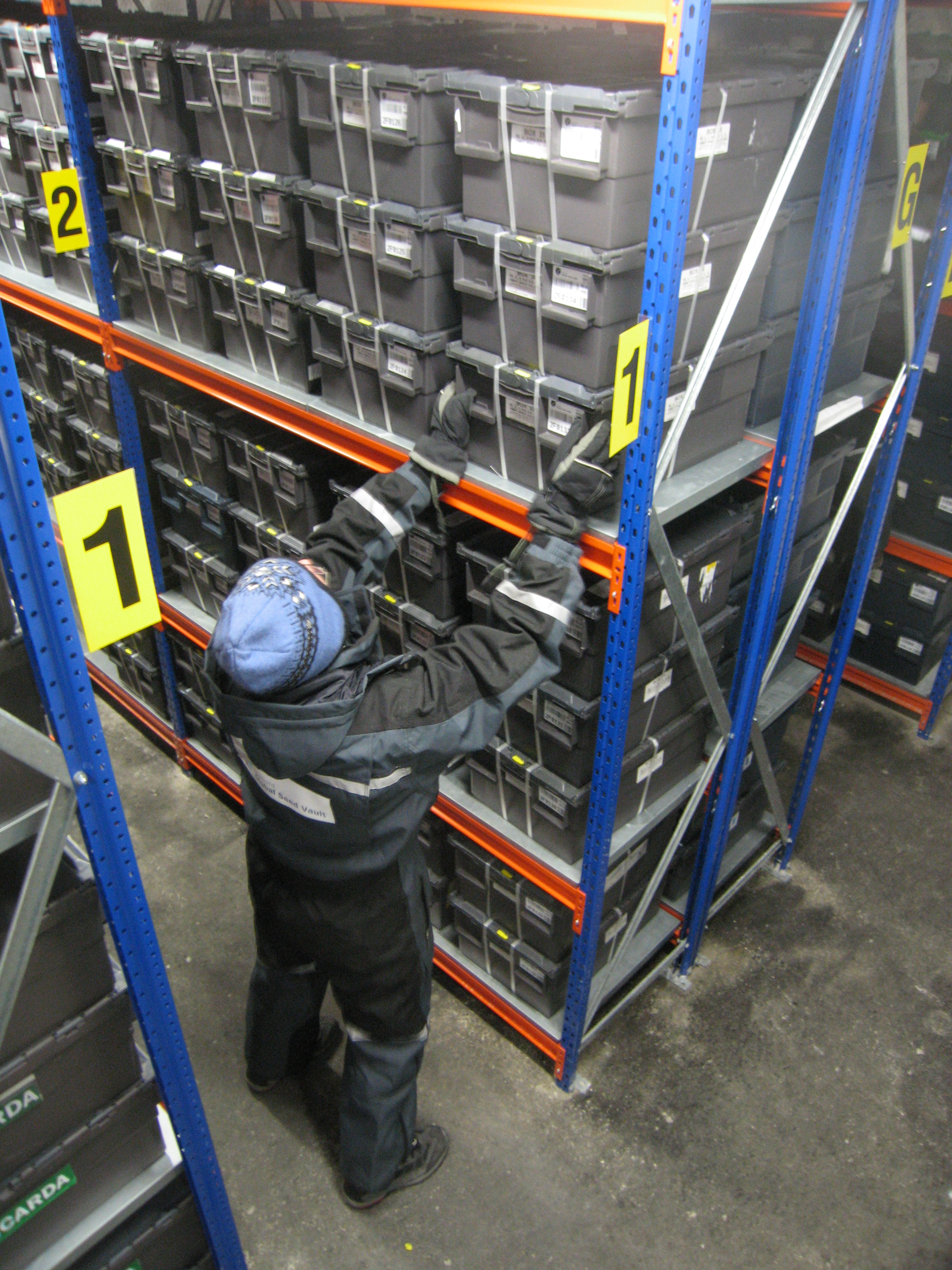
Storage containers at the Svalbard Global Seed Vault

An example of a DNA bank is the Svalbard Global Seed Vault, a seedbank which is intended to preserve a wide variety of plant seeds (such as important crops) in case of their extinction.

The Memory of Mankind project involves engraving human knowledge on clay tablets and storing it in a salt mine. The engravings are microscopic.

A Lunar ark has been proposed which would store and transmit valuable information to receiver stations on Earth. The success of this would also depend on the availability of compatible receiver equipment on Earth, and adequate knowledge of that equipment's operation.

The Arch Mission Foundation sent the Lunar Library, a 30 million page knowledge ark designed to survive for millions or billions of years in space, to the moon on the Israeli Beresheet spacecraft in 2019. The spacecraft experienced a crash landing. However, the library likely survived intact.

The Phoenix Mars lander, which landed on surface of Mars in 2008, included the "Visions of Mars" DVD, a digital library about Mars designed to last for hundreds or thousands of years.

On February 22, 2024, the Arch Mission successfully landed a Lunar Library on the Moon, on the Intuitive Machines IM-1 mission's Odysseus lander.

== In popular culture ==
- In 2020 science fiction book Ready Player Two, a spaceship named Vonnegut was launched to Proxima Centauri which also functions as a knowledge ark since it contains backups of humanity’s cultural materials, such as a standalone copy of the virtual universe OASIS which they call ARC@DIA.
- In the Horizon video game franchise, the APOLLO program was a knowledge ark that captured the entirety of human knowledge, intended to educate future societies and allow them to avoid the mistakes that doomed earlier human civilizations.
- The 1959 novel A Canticle for Leibowitz follows an order of monks whose goal is to preserve human knowledge following a nuclear apocalypse

== See also ==
- Archive
- Arch Mission Foundation
- Arctic World Archive
- Information repository
- KEO
- Longtermism
- Long Now Foundation
- Memory of Mankind
- Memory of the World Programme
- Noah’s Ark
- Rosetta Project
- Space and survival
- Survivalism
- Time capsule
- Universal library
