= Eckhaus Latta =

American fashion brand

- Industry: Fashion
- Founded: 2011; 15 years ago
- Founder: Zoe Latta; Mike Eckhaus
- Headquarters: Los Angeles; New York City, U.S.A.
- Number of locations: 2 Permanent Locations (Los Angeles, CA); 2016-present (New York, NY); 2018-present 1 Temporary Location (Whitney Museum, NY); Aug 3–Oct 8, 2018
- Key people: Zoe Latta (Co-Founder, Co-Designer); Mike Eckhaus (Co-Founder, Co-Designer)
- Website: www.eckhauslatta.com

Eckhaus Latta is an American fashion brand with locations in Los Angeles and New York City.

== History ==
The label was founded in 2011 by Mike Eckhaus and Zoe Latta. The two designers met as students at the Rhode Island School of Design, where Mike studied sculpture and Zoe textiles. In 2010, Eckhaus moved to NYC and began working as an accessories designer at Marc by Marc Jacobs while Latta ran a textiles business, Ruth Prince, selling prints to designers such as Calvin Klein and Proenza Schouler while designing knits for Opening Ceremony. Looking to move beyond the somewhat restricted commercial environments in which they worked, Eckhaus and Latta decided to design a collection together.

In 2018, Eckhaus Latta opened a show, Possessed, at the Whitney Museum, the first fashion-related exhibition at the museum in 21 years. The label previously exhibited their work, a sculptural collage of fashion, fine art, and video, in group shows at the Hammer Museum, (2016) and MoMA PS1, (2015). Additionally, Eckhaus Latta was nominated for the 2018 Edition of the LVMH Prize.

=== Collaborators ===
The Eckhaus Latta brand engages in a spectrum of collaborations, periodically collaborating with other brands and artists, from putting artists' sculptures into their store, to commissioning the furniture in their Los Angeles retail store, to working with Camper on a line of footwear.

Collaborators
Brian Chippendale
Susan Cianciolo
Alexa Karolinski
Emma T. Price
Jay Latta
Annabeth Marks
Jessi Reaves
Sophie Stone
Erica Sarlo
Nora Jane Slade
Camper
Eric Wrenn
Rachel Chandler
Dev Hynes
Alex Da Corte
Brendan Fowler
Valerie Keane
Martine Syms
Torey Thornton
Amy Yao
Riley O'Neill
Avena Venus Gallagher
Charlotte Wales

=== Unconventional models ===
Eckhaus Latta often uses non-professional or unconventional models in their advertising campaigns and runway shows. The label courted controversy with its first large-scale ad campaign when it showed adult models having unsimulated sex in the Spring 2017 collection.

| Unconventional Model | Profession |
|---|---|
| Danny Bowien | Chef |
| Susan Cianciolo | Artist |
| Thistle Brown | Stylist |
| Alex Chaves | Artist |
| Collier Schorr | Photographer |
| Barbara Ferris | Actress |
| Camille Bidault-Waddington | Stylist |
| Annabeth Marks | Artist |
| Coco Gordon Moore | Artist |
| Bobbi Salvör Menuez | Artist |
| Sophie Stone | Artist |
| Juliana Huxtable | Artist/DJ |
| Grace Dunham | Writer |
| Hari Nef | Actress |
| Dev Hynes | Musician |
| Kelela | Musician |
| Thea Wagner | Art Collector |
| Bridget Donahue | Gallerist |
| Ethel Cain | Musician |
| Sophie | Musician |
| Torey Thornton | Artist |
| Khalif Diouf | Musician |
| Stewart Uoo | Artist |
| Alex Olson | Skateboarder |
| Raphael Cohen | Artist |
| Lucy Chadwick | Gallerist |
| Cynthia Leung | Publicist |
| Maia Ruth Lee | Publicist |
| Daniela Lalita | Musician |
