= Cars in space =

Car in space may refer to:

- Lunar Roving Vehicles launched and driven on the surface of the Moon:
  - Apollo 15, in July 1971
  - Apollo 16, in April 1972
  - Apollo 17, in December 1972
- Elon Musk's Tesla Roadster, launched into outer space in February 2018
