= Arch Mission Foundation =

Knowledge preservation project

- Formation: October 24, 2016; 10 years ago Spring, Texas, U.S.
- Founders: Nova Spivack; Nick Slavin
- Type: Non-profit
- Tax ID no.: 81-3446615
- Purpose: Cultural preservation
- Location(s): Spring, Texas, U.S. Los Angeles, California, U.S.
- Key people: Nova Spivack, co-founder Nick Slavin, co-founder
- Website: ArchMission.org

Arch Mission Foundation is a non-profit organization whose goal is to create multiple redundant repositories of human knowledge around the Solar System, including on Earth. The organization was founded by Nova Spivack and Nick Slavin in 2015 and incorporated in 2016.

The Arch Mission plans to deliver multiple backups of civilization to locations around the Solar System as part of a distributed backup strategy.

== Project ==
The foundation plans "multiple...Arch libraries intended to preserve and disseminate humanity's knowledge across time and space for the benefit of future generations". The foundation is technology agnostic and will use whichever storage technology is best for its purposes including multiple technologies. The first method used is "5D laser optical data storage in quartz", which will reportedly remain readable for up to 14 billion years, resist cosmic radiation, and can withstand temperatures up to 1,000°C. The foundation also plans on spinning off companies based on patents from research groups involved with the technologies it uses to fund itself in the future.

== Data Archives ==
=== Arch disks 1 through 5 ===
As a proof of concept of the 5D optical data storage technology, Arch made 5 disks each containing Isaac Asimov's Foundation trilogy comprising about 3 megabytes each. The disks were created by Peter Kazansky at the University of Southampton's Optoelectronics Research Centre (ORC), the inventor of the 5D optical data storage technology and a member of Arch Mission Foundation's "Science and Technology Council". The discs are considered the longest-lasting storage objects ever created by humans.

== Solar Library ==
In December 2017, when Arch co-founder Nova Spivack heard that SpaceX was launching a Tesla into space, Spivack tweeted to Musk who jumped at the opportunity to include an Arch disk on the mission. Musk was also given the 1.1 disk for his private library. The 1.2 disk, named the 'Solar Library' by the Arch Mission Foundation also represents the first permanent space library, and is projected to orbit around the Sun for at least a few million years. The Solar Library was launched on the SpaceX Falcon Heavy test flight on February 6, 2018, inside Musk's red Tesla Roadster. The payload was placed in an elliptical orbit that extends nearly 243,000,000 miles (391,000,000 km) from the Sun at its farthest point.

== Lunar Library ==
In 2019, the Arch Mission sent the Lunar Library, a 30 million page library of books, data, images and a copy of English Wikipedia to the Moon aboard the Israeli Beresheet Lander. The Lunar Library also contained an unannounced microscopic sample of tardigrades, a form of life that can go into suspended animation and survive in space. Nova Spivack called himself a "space pirate" who contaminated the Moon by doing so, while some scientists argued that tardigrades were already present there. The Lunar Library also contains several vaults of secret content, including David Copperfield's magic secrets, a cafe's unpublished recipe for queso, a microscopic shrine including relics and spiritual texts, and a sample of the Bodhi leaf from India. On February 22, 2024, the Arch Mission successfully landed the Lunar Library on the Moon, on the Intuitive Machines IM-1 mission's Odysseus lander. This library included the Arch Lunar Art Archive featuring an exhibition of 135 contemporary artists from around the earth, including Aura Rosenberg, Nao Bustamante, Edgar Fabián Frías, Casey Kauffmann, Shana Moulton, Jared Madere, and Wednesday Kim, among others.

=== Method of storing information ===
The library was stored by etching high-resolution microscopic images into 25 thin layers of nickel. The first four layers include approximately 60,000 pages of textbooks, books on language, and information to be able to unravel the deeper layers.

DNA digital data storage is also used to store 20,000 images and 20 notable books. The analog layers of the Lunar Library have instructions to decode the DNA and be able to retrieve the digital information in it.

== Other projects ==
Arch hopes to seed the Solar System with millions and possibly billions of archives into "all kinds of locations". It wants to build a permanent library on the Moon and on Mars. Arch envisions its small light-weight disks might be an alternative means of moving large amounts of data between Earth and Mars as opposed to radio signals. The organization envisions connecting the Arch Libraries through a decentralised read-write data sharing network that spans the Solar System.

Data in the libraries will include Wikipedia, Project Gutenberg, human genomes, and other large open-data sets. They will also allow donations of money to instruct that certain data be included, and will do so without censorship of what can be included. The foundation cites the likelihood that a being developed enough to find and read the information would already possess significant technology as the reason for not prioritizing scientific data sets.

In February 2018, the Arch Mission successfully placed an archive called the Orbital Library, which contains a copy of Wikipedia, into low-Earth orbit. The Arch Mission has also built a payload called the Lunar Library, which serves as a backup to planet Earth and contains scientific, cultural and historical information in almost 30 languages and several encyclopedias including Wikipedia. The Lunar Library was set to arrive on the Moon on the Israeli spacecraft Beresheet, but it crashed landed on the Moon in May 2019. Despite this, the 30-million page Lunar Library possibly survived due to the strength of its construction.

In 2021, Arch Mission announced a partnership with Astrobotic Technology for several return missions to the Moon such as a second attempt to deliver the Lunar Library and for consumers to land their personal memories and photos on the Moon.

== See also ==
- Time capsule
- List of time capsules
- Voyager Golden Record
- Viking program
- Rosetta Project
- Knowledge ark
