= 5D optical data storage =

Computer memory type used for data preservation

5D optical data storage is an experimental nanostructured glass for permanently recording digital data using a femtosecond laser writing process. It is also branded Superman memory crystal, in reference to the Kryptonian memory crystals from the Superman franchise. Discs using this technology could be capable of storing up to 360 terabytes worth of data (at the largest size, 12 cm discs) for billions of years. The technology was developed by University of Southampton professor Peter Kazansky, who experimentally demonstrated the technology in 2013. The technology has been commercialized by SPhotonix, which markets it under the name 5D Memory Crystal. Hitachi and Microsoft have researched glass-based optical storage techniques, the latter under the name Project Silica.

The "5-dimensional" descriptor is because, unlike marking only on the surface of a 2D piece of paper or magnetic tape, this method of encoding uses two optical dimensions and three spatial co-ordinates to write throughout the material, which suggested the name '5D data crystal'. No exotic higher dimensional properties are involved. The size, orientation and three-dimensional position of the nanostructures comprise the so-called five dimensions.

== Technical design ==
The concept is to store data optically in non-photosensitive transparent materials such as fused quartz, which has high chemical stability. Recording data using a femtosecond-laser was first proposed and demonstrated in 1996. The storage medium consists of fused quartz, where the spatial dimensions, intensity, polarization, and wavelength are used to modulate data. By introducing gold or silver nanoparticles embedded in the material, their plasmonic properties can be exploited.

According to the University of Southampton:

The 5-dimensional discs [have] tiny patterns printed on 3 layers within the discs. Depending on the angle they are viewed from, these patterns can look completely different. This may sound like science fiction, but it's basically a really fancy optical illusion. In this case, the 5 dimensions inside of the discs are the size and orientation in relation to the 3-dimensional position of the nanostructures. The concept of being 5-dimensional means that one disc has several different images depending on the angle that one views it from, and the magnification of the microscope used to view it. Basically, each disc has multiple layers of micro and macro level images.

Recorded data can be read with a combination of an optical microscope and a polarizer.

The technique was first demonstrated in 2009 by researchers at the Swinburne University of Technology and in 2010 by Kazuyuki Hirao's laboratory at the Kyoto University, and developed further by Peter Kazansky's research group at the Optoelectronics Research Centre, University of Southampton. Discs recorded from that time have been tested for 3,100 hours at 100°C and shown to still work "perfectly" ten years later.

== Development ==
5D optical data storage was developed by Peter Kazansky, professor at the Optoelectronics Research Centre of the University of Southampton. The research group experimentally demonstrated the feasibility of the technology in 2013. The work built upon earlier studies in femtosecond-laser inscription in transparent materials conducted in the 1990s and 2000s.

The technology has been commercialized by SPhotonix, which markets it under the name 5D Memory Crystal. The laser inscription process is known as FemtoEtch.

Other organizations have investigated related glass-based optical storage methods, including Hitachi and Microsoft. In 2016, Microsoft Research Cambridge partnered with the University of Southampton to launch Project Silica, a research initiative aimed at scaling 5D storage for cloud archival applications. Kazansky served as the Southampton Principal Investigator. In 2019, the project successfully encoded and retrieved the 1978 film Superman on silica glass.

== Uses ==
In 2018, Peter Kazansky of the University of Southampton used the technology to store a copy of Isaac Asimov's Foundation trilogy, which was launched into space aboard Elon Musk's Tesla Roadster in association with the Arch Mission Foundation.

In 2024, Kazansky's group encoded the three billion character human genome and etched it onto a coin-sized 5D disc. It includes a visual key explaining how to use it, in homage to the Pioneer plaques that were placed on board the 1972 Pioneer 10 and 1973 Pioneer 11 spacecraft. They stored it in the Memory of Mankind archive, located in the world's oldest salt mine in Hallstatt, Austria.

In July 2025 Good Old Games, in collaboration with SPhotonix, encoded Heroes of Might and Magic III on the 5D crystal. It became the first video game ever preserved with this technology.

== See also ==
- 3D optical data storage – Storage with three-dimensional resolution for information
- Holographic data storage – Data storage technology
- Silica glass – Glass consisting of pure silica
- Data store – Repository for data collection storage and management
- DNA digital data storage – Process of encoding and decoding binary data to and from synthesized strands of DNA
