= Zoe Latta =

American fashion designer

Zoe Latta is an American fashion designer, co-founder of Eckhaus Latta.

== Early life and education ==
Latta grew up in Santa Cruz, California. Her childhood best friend was the architect Emma Price. Latta studied textiles at the Rhode Island School of Design, where she met her future creative & business partner, Mike Eckhaus. Eckhaus and Latta founded the Eckhaus Latta fashion label in 2011. Latta credits an influence by Susan Cianciolo, who described Latta and her business partner as "the new frontier of a voice for fashion".

== Career ==
Latta began working at Opening Ceremony as a day job, collaborating with Eckhaus in a small Willamsburg studio on the side. She co-founded Eckhaus Latta in 2011 and also founded a textile design company, Prince Ruth. She relocated to Los Angeles in her late twenties. Latta told Purple magazine that her Los Angeles studio's lack of a sign reflected her understated approach to bringing her business to the community. Latta said she intended for her Whitney Museum solo show with Eckhaus, “Possessed”, to explore the boundaries between retail spaces and artistic institutions. Latta expressed surprise that their label was nominated for a CFDA award, since she believed they had not "played the game or kissed the ring". Latta noted that she learned with experience to focus production on the most promising items, rather than a hodgepodge of ideas.

Latta's Substack newsletter "Rotting at the Vine" has touched on topics including "pharma swag", medical-branded items worn as fashion, which she called "silly byproducts of our sick sad world".

== Personal life ==
Latta told Vogue she was balancing career and motherhood after having a son with her partner, sculptor and winemaker Riley O'Neill. Latta became a parent during the pandemic, just after losing her father.
