= Jared Madere =

American artist and curatot

- Born: July 11, 1986 (age 40); New York City, United States
- Education: School of the Art Institute of Chicago
- Occupations: Contemporary artist, digital art, installation art, sculpture, performance art
- Website: Jared Madere

Jared Madere (born July 11, 1986, New York City) is an American contemporary artist and curator who lives and works in Berlin, Germany.

== Early life ==
Madere was born in New York City, New York, in 1986. He studied Painting and Sound at the School of the Art Institute of Chicago and earned a BFA in 2009.

== Career ==
=== Artistic practice ===
Madere began exhibiting his large scale installations internationally with the generational survey of monumental works DOOM: SURFACE Controle curated by Renaud Jerez at Le Magasin - Centre National d'Art Contemporain, Grenoble FR. In October 2015, Madere opened his North American solo debut at The Whitney Museum of American Art with an Untitled sculptural exhibition organized by curator Christopher Y. Lew. The following month, Madere hosted an art series of art exhibitions within his mobile gallery Bed-Stuy Love Affair in an RV outside the Whitney Museum of American Art.

Madere spent the first half of 2017 in Himachal Pradesh, India creating tapestries for the exhibition Anasthasia and Zoey staged in the hills below Gallu Devi. Later in the year, Madere was commissioned to create Unconditional Love, which would fill the atrium of the London department store Liberty for about 36 hours before it was removed due to technical reasons.

In 2018, Madere began work on his first sculptural opera Oouolyamtelbellembem Magical Crisis In The Special V.I.P. Spot which debuted in Los Angeles in November 2018 beneath the outgoing flight path of LAX International Airport. The following year Madere expanded upon this string of Frozen Operas with Stepped Onto The Moving Stairs Before I Could Tie My Shoes in Berlin and En Route To Burn The Palace I Was Told So Much Of The Queen's Virtues That By The Time I Reached The Gate I Had Become A Guard within their installation Pavilion Du Voyageurs for Nicolas Bourriaud's 16th edition of the Istanbul Biennial, The Seventh Continent. In 2021, Madere staged their fourth Frozen Opera, The Unpopular Courage of Dutchess Orchid Drop on the artificial snowboarding slope of Copenhagen's trash burning power plant Copenhill.

In addition to living collaborators, Madere often works with various implementations of machine learning artificial intelligence-based processes to assist in the creation of both sound and image.

For his artwork, Madere has worked with materials including raspberries, flowers, wax, and motor grease.

Madere's works have been exhibited internationally at various institutions and galleries, including the Whitney Museum of American Art, David Lewis Gallery, Bortolami, and The Watermill Center.

=== Curatorial practice ===
After moving to Brooklyn, New York, he opened the Bed-Stuy Love Affair gallery in 2013-2016, where he exhibited the work of many of his contemporaries, including Bradley Kronz, Jessi Reaves, and Jake Cruzen.

In 2014, the gallery became a mobile exhibition venue when it moved into a 30-foot truck complete with wrought iron gates armoring all of the vehicle windows, pink marble floors, and a flatscreen television with surround sound system, which played Tekken during exhibition openings.

In mid-2017, Madere opened the hybrid digital and traditional exhibition venue Mother Culture Los Angeles with artist Jake Cruzen and curator Milo Conroy.

== Notable works ==
- The Unpopular Courage of Dutchess Orchid Drop, Cucina X Copenhill, Copenhagen, 2021
- En route to burn the palace, I was told so much of the queen's virtues that by the time I reached the gate, I had become a guard, IKSV Istanbul Biennial, 2019
- Stepped Onto the Moving Stairs Before I Could Tie My Shoes, Mother Culture Berlin, Berlin, 2019
- Oouolyamtelbellembem Magical Crisis In The Special V.I.P. Spot, A Frozen Opera (2018)
- All Human Resources Shared Equally Now, La Panacée, Montpellier, France, 2018
- Unconditional Love, Liberty, London, 2017
- Untitled, Whitney Museum of American Art, New York, NY, 2015
- Untitled, Armada, Milan, Italy, 2015
- Untitled, Le Magasin, Grenoble, France 2014

== Reception ==
Noam Segal writes for the catalog of Nicolas Bourriaud's Crash Test that in both his artistic practice, Madere's works focus on "the annulment of any hierarchical order in the material and symbolic realm" and "the abolition of structures such as the superiority of discourse and western time perception."

Critic Clayton Press writes for Forbes, "it is difficult to capture the very real sense of ecstatic, if not romantic, intoxication that Madere conjures with his installations, environments, and visualizations."

Madere's work has been written about in international publications including Interview Magazine, ArtNews.com, Flash Art, The Times, The New York Times, Forbes, Mousse, ArtReview, and Artforum.

== Permanent collection ==
- Whitney Museum of American Art, New York, NY
- The Watermill Center, Water Mill, NY
- Kaikai Kiki, Tokyo

== Exhibitions ==
=== Selected solo and two person exhibitions ===
- 2015 - Jared Madere, Whitney Museum of American Art, New York, NY
- 2016 - Islands in the Stream, David Lewis, New York, NY
- 2016 - Jake Cruzen & Jared Madere: Prince Cherrie, White Flag Projects, Saint Louis, MO
- 2020 - In the back of the restaurant I made him kiss the ring | Haunted House in the Key of New Years, Galleria Federico Vavassori, Milan
- 2020 - Paths to G-ddess~ Tiny Dick Timmy Ricochet~ Live from the Geomancer's Clit Ring, Galleria Federico Vavassori, Milan
- 2020 - You say one thing n everyone acts like you don't mean the opposite of it at the same time too, Galleria Federico Vavassori, Milan
- 2021 - The Unpopular Courage of Dutchess Orchid Drop, Cucina X Copenhill, Copenhagen

=== Selected group exhibitions ===
- 2014 - DOOM:Surface Controle, Le Magasin, Grenoble, France
- 2017 - Fly Into The Sun, The Watermill Center, Water Mill, New York
- 2017 - Everything Is More Than One Thing Future Feel Good, Mother Culture Los Angeles, Los Angeles, CA
- 2018 - Crash Test, Curated by Nicolas Bourriaud, La Panacée, Montpellier, France
- 2019 - The Seventh Continent, curated by Nicolas Bourriaud, Istanbul Biennial, Istanbul, Turkey
- 2023- Ugly Painting, Nahmad Contemporary, New York, NY

== Curatorial ==
- 2008-2009: Curator/founder, New York City Gallery, Chicago
- 2013–present: Curator/founder, Bed-Stuy Love Affair, New York
- 2017–present: Curator/founder, Mother Culture, Los Angeles

== Selected bibliography ==
2021

- Jared Madere, "Kalpavriksha for Little Richard: Recent Developments in Artificial Intelligence as they Pertain to Social Imagination”, Flash Art.
