= Christopher Y. Lew =

American art curator and writer

Christopher Y. Lew is an American art curator and writer based in New York City. He founded The Curatorial Office with Wassan Al-Khudhairi to bring curatorial expertise beyond the museum. Lew is the former the Nancy and Fred Poses Curator at the Whitney Museum of American Art.

== Career ==
=== Curating ===
Before taking his job at the Whitney in 2014, Lew had held positions at MoMA PS1 starting in 2006. At MoMA PS1, he organized numerous exhibitions including Chim Pom, Clifford Owens: Anthology, and Nancy Grossman: Heads (with Klaus Biesenbach), as well as projects by Edgard Aragón, Rey Akdogan, Ilja Karilampi, James Ferraro, and Caitlin Keogh. Additionally, Lew has curated exhibitions and programs in New York City at other venues such as Artists Space and Aljira. Prior to joining the museum, he worked as managing editor at ArtAsiaPacific and held positions at the Aperture Foundation and the Asian American Arts Centre.

At the Whitney, Lew organized the first United States solo exhibitions for emerging artists Rachel Rose (artist) and Jared Madere. He also organized, with Curator Jay Sanders, the first U.S. theatrical presentation by New Theater. His other exhibitions at the Whitney include “Sophia Al-Maria: Black Friday” (2016); “Open Plan: Lucy Dodd” (2016); and the group show “Mirror Cells” (2016), co-organized with associate curator Jane Panetta, and "Eckhaus Latta: Possessed" (2018), co-organized with Lauri London Freedman, the head of product development at the Whitney.

Christopher Y. Lew co-organized the 2017 Whitney Biennial, with Mia Locks.

Lew curated Kevin Beasley's solo exhibition, “A view of a landscape”, the artist's first solo exhibition at a New York museum, opening in late 2018.

In November, 2021, it was announced Lew was leaving the Whitney where he spent close to seven years as the Nancy and Fred Poses Curator. In December 2021, it was announced Lew would be the inaugural chief artistic director of Horizon, a new nonprofit foundation and artist residency in Los Angeles. As a guest curator for the Whitney, he organized "Josh Kline: Project for a New American Century" in 2023 which as the artist's first US museum solo show.

=== Writing ===
Lew has written broadly for both art periodicals and mainstream news publications.
