= Olga Balema =

Ukrainian visual artist

- Ольга Балема
- Born: 1984 (age 41–42); Lviv, Ukrainian SSR, Soviet Union (now Ukraine)
- Education: University of Iowa, University of California, Los Angeles
- Occupation: artist
- Known for: sculpture

Olga Balema (Note: Ukrainian: Ольга Балема, romanized: Olha Balema) (born 1984) is an artist and sculptor. One of the major concerns of her work is form, another material. Another is paying attention to where and how things go into a space. Sometimes the work can be called site respondent, other times it responds only to itself. Her practice presents mundane materials in evocative forms. She is based in New York City, New York.

== Biography ==
Olga Balema was born in 1984 in Lviv, Ukraine. She earned a Bachelor of Fine Arts (2006) in sculpture from University of Iowa, and a Master of Fine Arts (2009) in new genres at the University of California, Los Angeles (UCLA).

In 2021 and 2017, Balema was awarded a Pollock-Krasner Foundation grant.

== Work ==
Balema often takes the psychological and physical characteristic of the gallery as a starting point for her work. She approaches art making in a way that de-stabilizes her own practice and proposes a tenuous and uncertain relationship between the artwork and its defining structures. Her sculptures enter into dialogue with site-responsive artistic practices of other periods, “ works that presented a reciprocity between the body of the sculpture and the cultural space that surrounds it”

=== Threat to Civilization 1-3 (2015) ===
Balema's 2015 show, Cannibals, exhibited her Threat to Civilization and Border/Boundary sculpture series. In her trademark style, Threat to Civilization 1-3 features PVC sacs of steel rods from past sculptural pieces soaking in water. Over time, the metal corrodes, leaving the sealed off and yet highly affective sacs at varying stages of decay and color, from yellow to red. The pieces, cannibalizing themselves, point to "the pleasure and pain of decay, and in that decay’s framing" while calling viewers to see themselves embodied in the strangely anthropomorphic forms. The regenerating matter does not disappear, but transform, reminding viewers that mortality is not an end or disappearance, but simply one stage in the fluid process of becoming.

=== Regulatory Bodies (2015) ===
From her first solo show, the Regulatory Bodies series includes Regulatory Bodies/FDA, Regulatory Bodies/USDA, Regulatory Bodies/EFSA, and Regulatory Bodies/WHO, rusting steel sheets dangled from the ceiling spelling out their respective agency names in rotting cucumber slices. The series was designed to questioned not just who and what constitutes a body, but who then controls the body. The pieces were designed to act as both a critiqueof the agencies that regulate and determine what people in the U.S. eat and to mock their own seriousness and appear humorous.

=== become a stranger to yourself (2017) ===
Another work of fluid filled plastic, become a stranger to yourself is stuffed with drawings of red lines that look like blood vessels and organ-like red materials alongside metal and ivory strings. As if a petri dish for the concept of "body," the work contains different signifiers for human bodies. The sac rests on the floor heavily, undoing viewers' understandings of the human/nonhuman, internal/external, subject/object binaries.

=== brain damage series (2019) ===
The brain damage show included 13 works (numbered 1-13) of elastic bands spread across the floor of the gallery room, as if a distributed nervous system. The bands, painted, stretched, ripped, nailed to walls, taut, curled like ribbons, and more, lay mainly flat on the ground. 2, one of the few vertical elements, stretches a few feet above the floor, with some of the painted elastic pieces hanging and others nailed to the floor at an angle. While there are connections between bands, the work is uneasy, "worn and stretched, jerry-rigged and encrusted with wear and time." This illegible map, obstacle course, or nervous system disrupts the viewer's desire for meaning and relationality, making visible the damage to connection. Several pieces feature nails attached only to the bands, dangling uselessly. The work is "definitely reduced, but not minimal," almost excessive in its strangeness, playing with static and dynamic forms. Some have considered the piece a "feminist homage" in response to the historically male-dominated genre of minimalism.

=== Computer (2021) ===
Balema's first solo exhibition in the UK, Computer, presented a single sculpture, a massive digital rendering of a carpet, printing in pieces and reformed in a grid. Made in both her studio and on the street in New York, the pixelated piece is a depository, marked by traces of Balema’s hand and the city streets. The work abstracts space and installation art itself while highlighting the "circulation and machinations of image production."

== Exhibitions ==
Select exhibitions include

- 2015 – Surround Audience, New Museum Triennial. New Museum, New York City, New York.
- 2019 –Whitney Biennal 2019, Whitney Museum of American Art. New York City, New York, 2019.

== See also ==
- Eva Hesse
- Senga Nengudi
- Tiona Nekkia McClodden
- Julia Thompson
