= Jessi Reaves =

American artist

- Born: 17 October 1986 (age 40); Portland, Oregon
- Education: Rhode Island School of Design
- Known for: Sculpture

Jessi Reaves (born 1986, Portland) is an artist based in New York. Known for her multifaceted sculptural practice which blurs the lines between the functional and the aesthetic, she has been the subject of solo exhibitions at institutions including the Arts Club of Chicago; the Contemporary Arts Museum Houston; the Carnegie Museum of Art, Pittsburgh; and the Aldrich Contemporary Art Museum, Ridgefield, CT. Her work is in the collections of the Brandhorst Museum, Munich; the Hammer Museum, Los Angeles; the Whitney Museum of American Art, New York; and the Carnegie Museum of Art, Pittsburgh; among others. She has been artist in residence at Fallingwater and Chinati Foundation.

== Biography ==
Born and raised in Portland, Oregon, Jessi Reaves studied painting at the Rhode Island School of Design, graduating with a BFA degree in 2010.

She presented her first solo exhibition at Bridget Donahue, New York in April 2016. In 2017, she participated in the Whitney Biennial. “Rejecting the sleek craftsmanship of iconic midcentury design, Reaves exaggerates markers of construction to an almost aggressive abundance,” note co-curators Christopher Y. Lew and Mia Locks. In 2018, Reaves participated in the 57th Carnegie International at the Carnegie Museum of Art in Pittsburg, PA.

- Also in 2018, John Galliano invited Reaves to create raw, deconstructed sculptures for Maison Margiela's SS18 couture runway collection.
- Reaves was appointed Fall 2020 Teiger Mentor in the Arts at Cornell University - AAP program.

== Exhibitions ==
=== Selected solo exhibitions ===
2024

- Reflect as One, Galerie Crèvecoeur 5 & 7 rue de Beaune, Paris, France, April 25 - July 20

2023

- Above the cold, San Carlo Cremona, Cremona, Italy, October 6 - December 31
- All possessive lusts dispelled, The Arts Club of Chicago, February 15 - May 20

2022

- At the well, Bridget Donahue, New York, New York, September 15 - November 17
- Jessi Reaves & Bradley Kronz: The Label Lied (two person exhibition), High Art, Arles, France, February 26 - April 16

2021

- Wild Life: Elizabeth Murray & Jessi Reaves (two person exhibition), Carnegie Museum, Pittsburgh, Pennsylvania,

September 4 - January 9, 2022

- Wild Life: Elizabeth Murray & Jessi Reaves (two person exhibition), Contemporary Arts Museum Houston, Houston, Texas

2019

- Going out in style, Herald Street, London, United Kingdom, November 14 - January 25, 2019
- II, Bridget Donahue, New York, New York, March 14 - May 12

2018

- Kitchen Arrangement within The Domestic Plane: New Perspectives on Tabletop Art Objects, The Aldrich Contemporary Art Museum, Ridgefield, CT, May 20 - January 13, 2019

2017

- android stroll, Herald St, London, United Kingdom, September 30 - November 12
- 31 Candles Jessi Reaves featuring Bradley Kronz & Jessi Reaves
- (Waiting for Boots), Dorich House Museum, Kingston University, London, United Kingdom, September 7 - November 4
- Ginny Casey and Jessi Reaves (two person exhibition), Institute of *Contemporary Art Philadelphia, Pennsylvania, April 28 - August 6

2016

- Jessi Reaves, Bridget Donahue, New York, New York, April 10 - June 5
- Now Showing: Jessi Reaves, Sculpture Center, Long Island City, New York, January 24 - April 4

=== Selected group exhibitions ===
SELECTED GROUP EXHIBITIONS 2024 Café Crèvecoeur, Galerie Crèvecoeur, Montesquiou, July 5 - July 31 These Mad Hybrids: John Hoyland and Contemporary Sculpture, Royal West of England Academy, Bristol, UK, February 3 - May 12 SHINE ON, Sadie Coles HQ, London, United Kingdom, February 15 - April 27 The New Village: Ten Years of New York Fashion, Pratt Manhattan Gallery, New York, January 22 - March 16 2023 Home is Where You’re Happy, Haus Mödrath - Räume Für Kunst, Kerpen, Germany, October 8 - August 25, 2024 Solstice, Galerie Crevecoeur, Paris, France, November 11, 2023 - January 27, 2024 darling, your head’s not right, curated by Danica Lundy, François Ghebaly, New York, New York, July 5 - September 15 Customs Cars Cultures, curated by Kyle Thurman, UncleBrother, Hancock, New York, July 1 - September 4 Ecstatic: Selections from the Hammer Contemporary Collection, Hammer Museum, Los Angeles, California, June 10 - August 27 A Study in Form, curated by Arden Wohl, James Fuentes, New York, New York, May 3 - June 3 At Gate, Blue Velvet Projects, Zurich, Switzerland, March 11 - April 8 From Andy Warhol to Kara Walker. Scenes from the Collection, Brandhorst Museum, Munich, Germany, February 28 - July 14, 2024 2022 The odds are good, the goods are odd, Lisson Gallery, New York, New York, June 29 - August 6 Catechism, Bridget Donahue, New York, New York, June 8 - July 29 2021 DOG, Company, New York, New York, June 4 - July 10 Finding Our Way, Lumber Room, Portland, Oregon, March 14 - May 3 2020 Via dell’Inferno, Herald St at Galleria Spazia, Bologna, Italy Akeem Smith: No Gyal Can Test, Red Bull Arts New York, New York, September 24 - November 15 2019 Slant Step Forward, Verge Center for the Arts, Sacramento, California, September 12 - October 27 Il est une fois dans l’Ouest, Frac Nouvelle-Aquitaine MÉCA, Bordeaux, France, June 29 - November 9 Perverse Furniture, Artspace, New Haven, Connecticut, May 19 - June 29 2018 Carnegie International, 57th Edition, Carnegie Museum, Pittsburgh, Pennsylvania, October 13 - March 25, 2019 Eckhaus Latta: Possessed, Whitney Museum of American Art, New York, New York, August 3 - October 8 SI ONSITE, Swiss Institute, New York, New York, semi-permanent installation, beginning The Phantom of Liberty: Contemporary Works in the RISD Museum Collection, RISD Museum, Providence, Rhode Island, May 4 - December 30 99 BOWERY 2ND FLOOR, NEW YORK, NY 10002 USA BRIDGETDONAHUE.NYC Sit-In, September Gallery, Hudson, New York, April 7 - May 20 Loopstar Future Feel Good: Jessi Reaves, Mother Culture, Los Angeles, California, March 2 - April 30 2017 Interiors, Galerie Maria Bernheim, Zurich, Switzerland, November 1 - February 23, 2018 Steps to Aeration, Tanya Leighton, Berlin, Germany, July 8 - September 1 Midtown, Lever House, organized by Maccarone and Salon 94, New York, New York, May 3 - June 9 Liminal Focus, Barbara Mathes Gallery, New York, New York, April 26 - June 30 Whitney Biennial 2017, Whitney Museum of American Art, New York, New York, March 17 -June 11 Ruins in the Snow, High Art, Paris, France, February 22 - April 1 Looking Back/ The 11th White Columns Annual, White Columns, New York, January 14 - March 4 2016 A Cautionary Tale: Jessi Reaves and Bradley Kronz, A Palazzo Gallery, Brescia, Italy, December 15 - January 25, 2017 Dolores, Team Gallery, New York, New York, September 8 - October 9 Outside, Karma, Amagansett, New York, September 3–25 Gallery Share, Off Vendome, New York, New York, May 5 Bloody Life, Herald Street, London, England, April 24 - May 29 Design & Crime, Éric Hussenot, Paris, France, April 23 - June 4 Real Fine Arts Presents, New York, 809 Washington Street, New York, New York, March 2–6 Jessi Reaves & Sophie Stone: How to Remove Stains, Del Vaz Projects, Los Angeles, California, January 15 - April 15 2015 Natural Flavor, Ludlow 38, New York, New York, November 12 - December 13 Swiss Institute Annual Architecture and Design Series: Second Edition, ‘Pavillon De L’Esprit Nouveau: A 21st Century Show Home’, curated by Felix Burrichter, New York, New York, September 25 - November 8 Summer Group Show, Germantown, New York, curated by Matt Moravec and Taylor Trabulus, August 29–30 Panic Pants, Essex Flowers, New York, New York, June 28 - August 2 Living Rooms, Old Room Gallery, New York, New York, curated by Josh Kline, February 7 - March 7 Paramount Ranch, Shoot the Lobster Gallery, Los Angeles, California, January 31 - February 1 Das Gesamtsexwerk, M/L Art Space, Brooklyn, New York, January 17 2014 Seau Banco Carbon, Bed Stuy Love Affair Gallery, New York, New York, December 22 - January 2 La Casa del Cazu Merzu, Shoot the Lobster Gallery, New York, New York, September 19 - October 19 American Basketry, Bed Stuy Love Affair, New York, New York, August 15 - September 6 My Old Friend, My New Friend, My Girlfriend, My Cousin and My Mentor, Shoot the Lobster Gallery, New York, New York, curated by JPW3, May 29 - June 29

=== Selected press ===
2024 Rémi Guezodje, “Jessi Reaves, de l’inattention à l’inattendu”, Libération (July 10), https://www.liberation.fr/culture/arts/art-contemporain/jessi-reaves-de-linattention-alinattendu-20240710_4WN7BOJBAJB3JOH2N4OAI4H6TQ/ “Jessi Reaves: Reflect as one”, The Art Newspaper, Edition Française, (May), https://www.artnewspaper.fr/2024/05/17/gestes-simples-art-tantrique-et-rencontres-improbables Aarthi Mohan, “In search of the sublime: The multifaceted artistry of Jessi Reaves”, STIRpad (June 7), https://www.stirpad.com/news/stir-news/in-search-of-the-sublime-the-multifaceted-artistry-of-jessi-reaves/? utm_source=search_bar&utm_medium=stirpad_search. Ada O’Higgins, “A Stitch in Time”, Artforum, online and in print May 2024, pp. 11–12 https://www.artforum.com/columns/ada-ohiggins-the-new-village-552341/ 2023 Anna Frattini, “Jessi Reaves Continues to Challenge the Boundary Between Art and Design”, Collater.al (October 18), https://www.collater.al/en/jessi-reaves-above-the-cold-san-carlo-cremona-art-design/ Lori Waxman, “To sit or not to sit: Jessi Reaves shows her furniture sculptures in ‘All possessive lusts dispelled’ at the Arts Club”, Chicago Tribune (April 29), https://www.chicagotribune.com/entertainment/museums/ct-ent-jessi-reaves-arts-club-review-20230430 bcbqe2qucrae7fzhl556k5grky-story.html Vasia Rigou, “Decadent Design: A Review of Jessi Reaves’ “All possessive lusts dispelled” at the Arts Club of Chicago”, New City Art (February 27), https://art.newcity.com/2023/02/27/decadent-design-takes-center-stage-a-review-of-jessi-reaves-all-possessive-lusts dispelled-at-the-arts-club-of-chicago/ 2022 Em Rooney, "The Artists’ Artists: Twenty-six artists reflect on 2022" Artforum, (December), https://www.artforum.com/print/202210/twenty-six-artists-reflect-on-2022-89662 Brainard Carey, "Jessi Reaves Interview", Yale University Radio (November 15), https://museumofnonvisibleart.com/interviews/jessi-reaves/ Cassie Packard, "Review: Jessi Reaves", Artforum, November, 2022, p. 188-189 C. Reinhardt, “New York — Jessi Reaves: ‘At the well’ at Bridget Donahue Through November 19”, Art Observed (October), http://artobserved.com/2022/10/new-york-jessi-reaves-at-the-well-at-bridget-donahue-through-november-19th-2022/ Johanna Fateman, "Jessi Reaves", The New Yorker (October 15), https://www.newyorker.com/goings-on-about-town/art/jessi-reaves-2022 2021 Octavia Bürgel, "Jessi Reaves Leaves it dirty", 032 (June 17) https://032c.com/jessi-reaves-leaves-it-dirty 99 BOWERY 2ND FLOOR, NEW YORK, NY 10002 USA BRIDGETDONAHUE.NYC 2020 Yxta Maya Murray, “Artful Volumes: Bookforum Contributors on the Season’s Outstanding Art Books: Wildlife: Elizabeth Murray and Jessi Reaves”, Bookforum (December), https://www.bookforum.com/print/2704/the-season-s-outstanding-art-books-24278 Jessi Reaves, Gaetano Pesce, "It's Alive! The Amorphous Imaginary of Gaetano Pesce", SSENSE (March 4), https://www.ssense.com/en-us/editorial/art/its-alive-the-amorphous-imaginary-of-gaetano-pesce Rachel Hahn, “Lou Dallas Celebrated Valentine’s Day by Bringing Fragonard’s Most Famous Painting to Life”, Vogue (February 19), https://www.vogue.com/vogueworld/article/lou-dallas-raffaella-hanley-valentines-day-decor-band-jessi-reaves-live-sculpture-public-arts 2019 Leah Singer, Jessi Reaves, Apartamento Issue #24 (Fall/Winter) 169-183 Chris Wiley, “The Beguiling Work of Jessi Reaves”, Frieze (June 1), https://frieze.com/article/beguiling-work-jessi-reaves “Freedom of Expression”, RISDXYZ (Spring/Summer), 13 Tiffany Lambert, “Trash Aesthetics” Pin-Up (Spring/Summer), 250-255 Kathy Leonard Czepiel, “Unsettling In”, Daily Nutmeg (May 23), http://dailynutmeg.com/2019/05/23/perverse-furniture-artspace-unsettling-in/ Brian Slattery, “Artspace Gets Perverse”, New Haven Independent (May 22), https://www.newhavenindependent.org/index.php/archives/entry/artspace_perverse_furniture/ Eliza Barry, "Jessi Reaves: II”, Brooklyn Rail (May), https://brooklynrail.org/2019/05/artseen/Jessi-Reaves-II Meredith Mendelsohn, "Jessi Reaves”, Sculpture Magazine (April 29), https://sculpturemagazine.art/jessi-reaves/ Holland Cotter, “Over 40 Art Shows to See Right Now - Spring Gallery Guide: Below and Above Canal Street”, The New York Times (April 26), https://www.nytimes.com/2019/04/26/arts/design/gallery-guide-canal-street.html Keshav Anand, “Jessi Reaves: Bringing Eccentricity To The Domestic”, Something Curated (April 24) “Reaves’ Wondrous Wreckage” Our RISD (April 16) Alina Cohen, “5 Standout New York Exhibitions to See This April”, Artsy (April 5) “8 New York Art Exhibitions Not To Miss This April: Jessi Reaves II”, Something Curated (April 3) Johanna Fateman, “Jessi Reaves”, The New Yorker (March 28) Antonia Marsh, “Antonia Marsh: The Absurdist Sculpture of Jessi Reaves”, AnOther Magazine (March 27) “Works By Park McArthur, Alex Da Corte, Huma Bhaba, and More Enter Carnegie Museum of Art Collection”, Artforum (March 26) “9 Art Events in New York: Jessi Reaves, Gary Indiana, Barthélémy Toguo, and More”, ARTnews (March 11), http://www.artnews.com/2019/03/11/9-art-events-nyc-jessi-reaves-gary-indiana-barthelemy-toguo/ Scott Turri, “Same Ol’ Carnegie”, New Art Examiner (January/February), volume 33 2018 Maria Savostyanova, “Reaves’s Beads”, Interior+Design (October 1), 208 Alix Browne, “T Introduces Jessi Reaves”, T Magazine - The New York Times (September 9), 47-48 Glenn Adamson, “Sculpture To Dwell On”, Art in America (September), 71-77 Whitney Bauck, “If Eckhaus Latta’s Whitney Museum Exhibition Is A Scam, It’s A Good One”, Fashionista (August 8), https://fashionista.com/2018/08/eckhaus-latta-possessed-whitney-museum-exhibit Andrea Valluzzo, “Aldrich to survey tabletop art in The Domestic Plane”, Stratford Star (May 17), https://www.stratfordstar.com/80962/aldrich-to-survey-tabletop-art-in-the-domestic-plane/ Felix Burrichter, Jack Chiles, Marc Matchak, “Mental Furniture”, Pin-Up (Spring/ Summer), Issue 24 Sarah Rafson, “57th Carnegie International will bring artists who engage spatial politics around the world”, Architects Newspaper (April 23), https://archpaper.com/2018/04/57th-carnegie-international-pittsburgh/#gallery-0-slide-0 Amy Serafin, “Ottoman Empire”, Wallpaper (May), 147-153 Alex Greenberger, “Here’s the Artist List for the 2018 Carnegie International”, ArtNews (April 11), http://www.artnews.com/2018/04/11/heres-artist-list-2018-carnegie-international/ Kieron Marchese, “John Galliano Invites Sculptor Jessi Reaves to Create Raw, Deconstructed Pieces at Maison Margiela SS18”, Designboom (January 25), https://www.designboom.com/design/maison-margiela-ss18-john-galliano-jessi-reaves-01-25-2018/ Elizabeth Paton, “At Maison Margiela, a Sculptor and a Designer Unite”, The New York Times (January 24), https://mobile.nytimes.com/2018/01/24/fashion/maison-margiela-john-galliano-jessi-reaves.html?referer= 2017 Silvia Sgualdini, “Jessi Reaves and Bradley Kronz Dorich House Museum/ London”, Flash Art, no. 50 (November 27) Josephine Graf, “Nicola L.”Frieze (October 23) Eliza Barry, “A Chair Is A Chair Is A Sculpture: On Jessi Reaves and the Decorative Unconscious”, Columbia University (May 24) Roberta Smith, “The Met’s Rei Kawakubo Show, Dressed for Defiance”, The New York Times (May 4) Ruba Katrib, “A Cautionary Tale by Bradley Kronz and Jessi Reaves”, Document, No. 10 (Spring/ Summer), 220 - 227 Johanna Fateman, “Rights and Privileges: Johanna Fateman on the 2017 Whitney Biennial”, Artforum (May), 296-302 Cat Kron, “Ginny Casey and Jessi Reaves”, Artforum (May) Gesine Borcherdt, “Form Versus Function”, Blau, No. 17 (March), featured on cover, 48-53 Chris Sharp and Genevieve Yu, “Double Take - Whitney Biennial”, Art Agenda (March 21), http://www.art-agenda.com/reviews/double-take%E2%80%94whitney-biennial-2017/ Evan Moffitt, “Waste Land”, Frieze (March 19) Novembre Magazine, Issue 11 (March 1), spread featuring sculpture by Jessi Reaves, fashion by Lou Dallas, 254-258 Michele D’Aurizio, “Jessi Reaves and Bradley Kronz”, Flash Art, No. 331 (February/ March) Roberta Smith, “What to See in New York Art Galleries This Week: Looking Back: The 11th White Columns Annual”, The New York Times (February 24) 99 BOWERY 2ND FLOOR, NEW YORK, NY 10002 USA BRIDGETDONAHUE.NYC Geneva Bria, “The Warning of Jessi Reaves and Bradley Kronz: Brescia”, Artribune (January 16) 2016 Natasha Stagg, “Curve Appeal”, Pin-Up Magazine, Issue 21 (Fall/Winter 2016/2017), 73 Robin Pogrebin, “Here Comes the Whitney Biennial, Reflecting the Tumult of the Times”, The New York Times (November 17) Gaetano Pesce and Jessi Reaves, edited by Marco Braunschweiler, “Introducing: Conversations Between Two Artists Who Have Never Met Before”, Museum of Contemporary Art Los Angeles: Stream (November 11), http://www.moca.org/stream/post/introducing-gaetano-pesce-and-jessi-reaves Eric Sutphin, “Jessi Reaves”, Art in America (September), p. 144 “Jessi Reaves at Bridget Donahue”, Contemporary Art Writing Daily (June 8), http://www.artwritingdaily.com/2016/06/jessi-reaves-at-bridget-donahue.html?m=1 Christie Chu, “10 Millennial Artists to Watch in 2016: Jessi Reaves”, Artnet News (June 6), https://news.artnet.com/art-world/10-millennial-artists-watch-2016-511961 Kavior Moon, “Jessi Reaves and Sophie Stone”, Artforum (Summer), 405 David Ebony, “David Ebony’s Top 10 New York Gallery Shows for May”, Artnet News (May 25) Claire Voon, “The Visual Indulgences of Furniture Made From Scraps”, Hyperallergic (May 18) D. Creahan, “New York - Jessi Reaves at Bridget Donahue Through June 5th, 2016”, Art Observed (May 14) Leigh Anne Miller, “Lookout: Jessi Reaves”, Art in America (April 29) “Jessi Reaves”, The New Yorker (April 27) Sam Korman, “Jessi Reaves”, Flash Art (April 26), Issue 307 Roberta Smith, “Lower East Side As Petri Dish”, The New York Times (April 22), C29 Katherine Cusumano, “Domestic Ills: Sculptor Jessi Reaves Elevates Furniture By Making It Weirder”, W Magazine (April 21) John Zane Zappas, “Jessi Reaves & Sophie Stone at Del Vaz Projects”, Contemporary Art Review Los Angeles (April 14), http://contemporaryartreview.la/jessi-reaves-sophie-stoneat-del-vaz-projects/ Eckhaus Latta, “Sightlines”, Art in America (April), 37 Jessi Reaves, “Biopic: The story behind an artwork, in the artist’s own words”, Modern Painters (April), 47 Josephine Graf, “An Ideological Revision of Furniture Design: Josephine Graf in Conversation with Jessi Reaves”, Mousse Magazine, (February 17), 230 - 237 2015 Julia Trotta, “Scrap Queen”, Pin-Up Magazine, Issue 19 (Fall/Winter 2015/2016), 52 - 53 Carson Chan, “The Great Indoors: Show Home”, Pin-Up Magazine, Issue 19 (Fall/Winter 2015/2016), 209 - 225 Kate Messinger, “6 Contemporary Female Sculptors to Know (Plus Pieces You Can Afford)”, Man Repeller (November 12), http://www.manrepeller.com/best_of_internet/6-contemporary-female-sculptors-to-know.html Lyndsy Welgos, “Summer Group Show”, Topical Cream (September 17), http://topicalcream.info/blog/summer-group-show/ “Featured Artist: Jessi Reaves”, SculptureNotebook, (August 25–29) http://www.sculpture-center.org/exhibitionsCuratorsNotebook.htm “Jessi Reaves”, interview with Bridget Donahue, Foundations, No. 3 (Fall/Winter), 26 - 33

== Awards ==
- 2017 Special Mention, Hublot Design Prize, Switzerland
- 2020 Teiger Mentor in the Arts at Cornell University

== Permanent collections ==
- Carnegie Museum of Art, Pittsburgh, Pennsylvania
- Frac Nouvelle-Aquitaine MÉCA, Bordeaux, France
- Museum Brandhorst, Munich, Germany
- RISD Museum of Art, Providence, Rhode Island
- Whitney Museum of American Art, New York, New York

== Selected publications ==
- 2021 Wild Life: Elizabeth Murray & Jessi Reaves, ed. Karen Kelly, Rebecca Matalon, Barbara Schroeder, Text by Rebecca Matalon, Conversation

by Kate Horsfield & Elizabeth Murray, Johanna Fateman & Jessi Reaves, Dancing Foxes Press/CAMH

- 2019 Slant Step Book: The Mysterious Object and the Artworks It Inspired, eds. Francesca Wilmott, Verge Center for the Arts, Sacramento, 62-63.
- 2018 Ginny Casey & Jessi Reaves, Institute of Contemporary Art, Philadelphia
- 2017 Jessi Reaves and Alex Field, “Advice and Wisdom Gained From Fashion’s Brightest Thinkers”, A Magazine Curated By Eckhaus Latta

(September), issue #17, 180-183
