= Elon Musk's Tesla Roadster =

Sports car launched into space in 2018

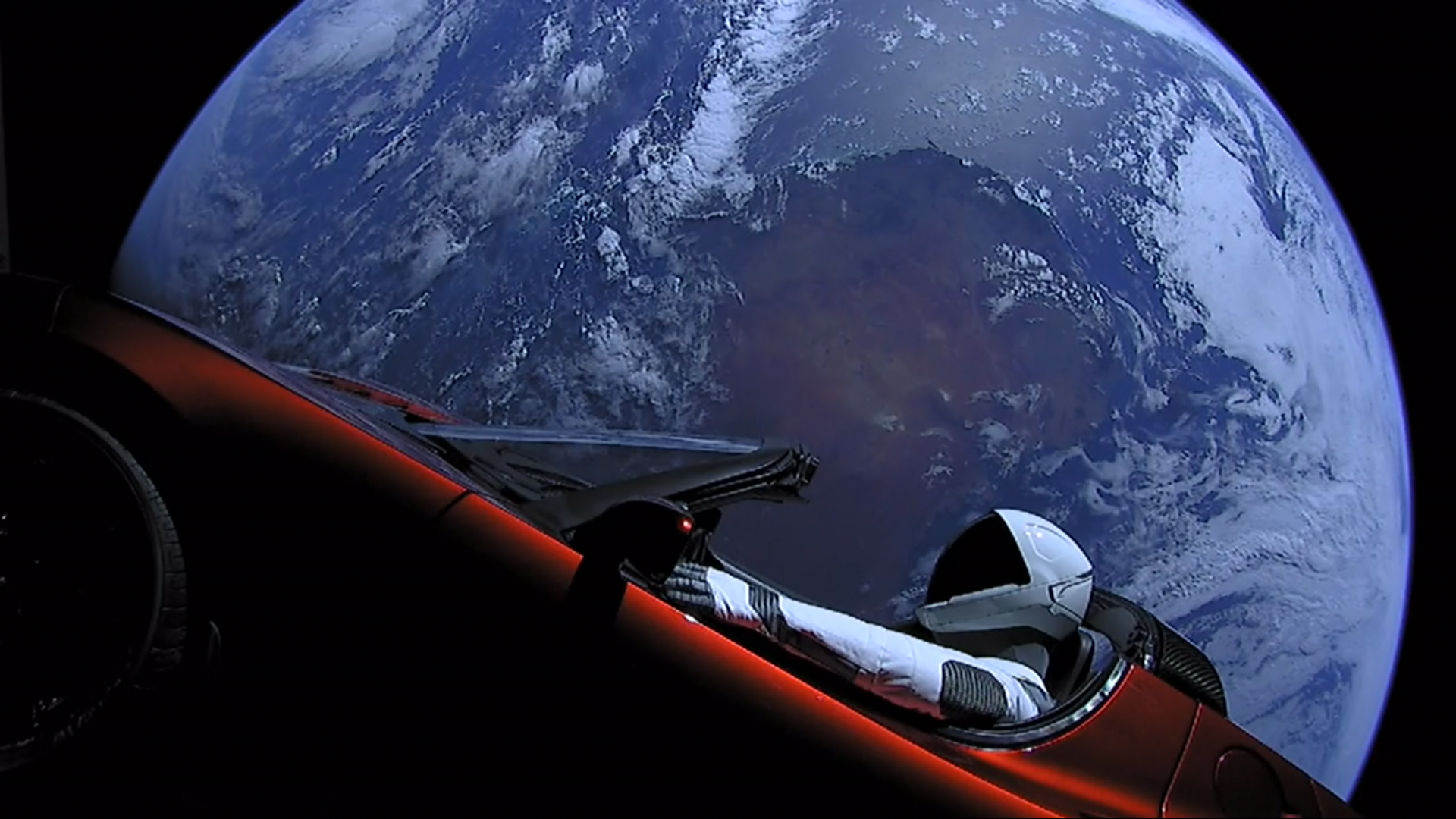
- Elon Musk's Tesla Roadster. Earth is in the background.
- Names: SpaceX Roadster; Starman
- Mission type: Test flight
- Operator: SpaceX
- COSPAR ID: 2018-017A
- SATCAT no.: 43205
- Mission duration: Active: 1 Day; In Orbit: 8 years, 9 months and 10 days

Spacecraft properties
- Spacecraft type: 2010 Tesla Roadster used as a mass simulator, attached to the upper stage of a Falcon Heavy rocket
- Manufacturer: Tesla and SpaceX
- Launch mass: ~1,300 kg (2,900 lb); ~5,900 kg (13,000 lb) including rocket upper stage

Start of mission
- Launch date: February 6, 2018, 3:45 pm EST (20:45 UTC)
- Rocket: Falcon Heavy FH-001
- Launch site: Kennedy LC-39A
- Contractor: SpaceX

End of mission
- Deactivated: February 7, 2018

Orbital parameters
- Reference system: Heliocentric
- Eccentricity: 0.25571
- Perihelion altitude: 0.98613 au (147,523,000 km)
- Aphelion altitude: 1.6637 au (248,890,000 km)
- Inclination: 1.077°
- Period: 1.525 year
- Epoch: 1 May 2018

Elon Musk's Tesla Roadster is an electric sports car that served as the dummy payload for the February 2018 Falcon Heavy test flight and became an artificial satellite of the Sun. A mannequin in a spacesuit, dubbed "Starman", occupies the driver's seat. The car and rocket are products of Tesla and SpaceX, respectively, both companies headed by Elon Musk. Musk personally owned the 2010 Roadster and previously used it for commuting to work. It is the first production car launched into space.

The car, mounted on the rocket's second stage, was launched on an escape trajectory and entered an elliptical heliocentric orbit crossing the orbit of Mars. The orbit reaches a maximum distance from the Sun at aphelion of 1.66 astronomical units (au). Video of the Roadster during the launch was transmitted back to the mission control center and live-streamed.

Advertising analysts noted Musk's sense of brand management and use of new media for his decision to launch a Tesla into space. Musk explained he wanted to inspire the public about the "possibility of something new happening in space" as part of his larger vision for spreading humanity to other planets.

== Background ==
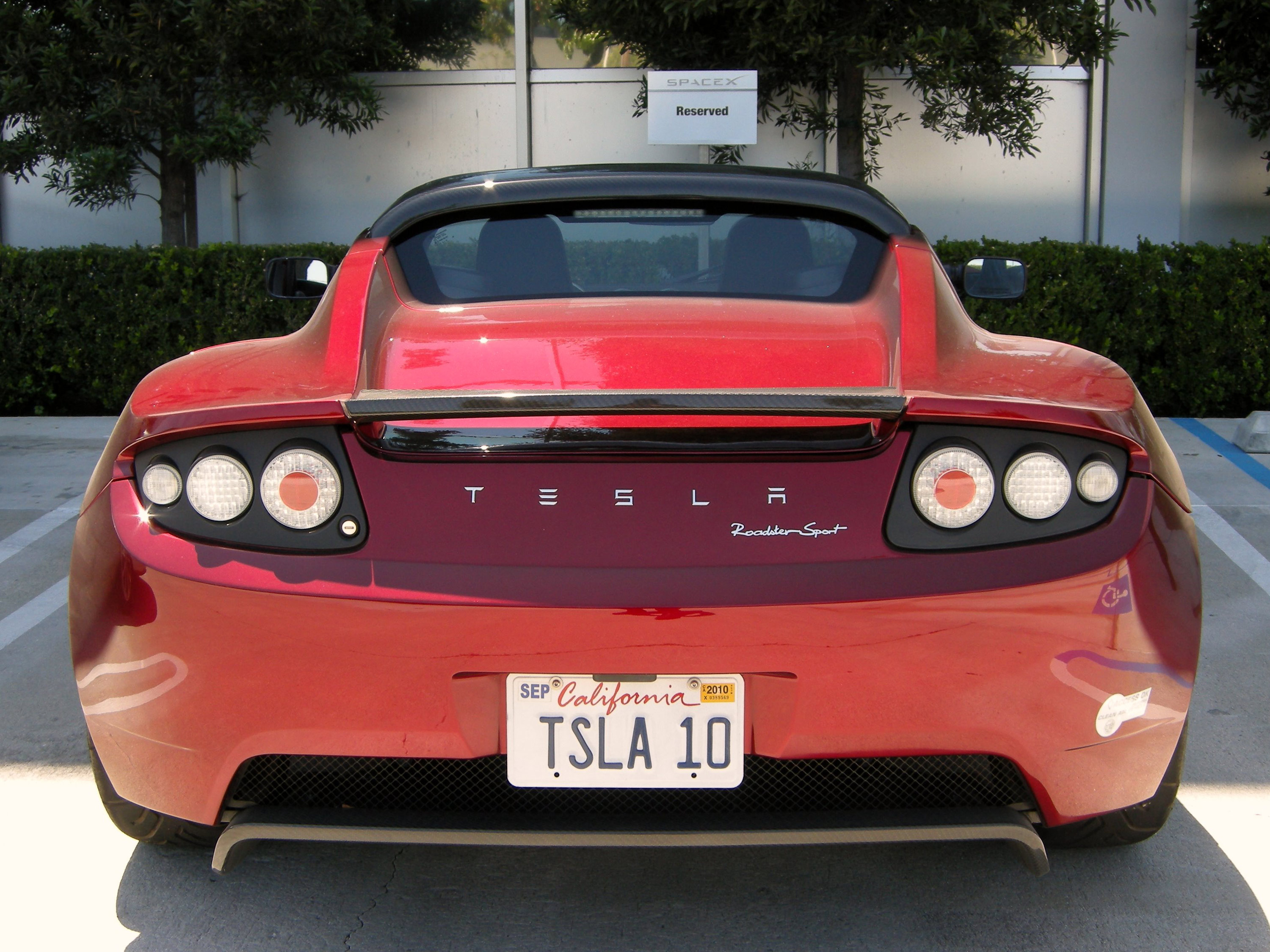
Musk's Tesla Roadster parked outside SpaceX, 2010

In March 2017, SpaceX's founder, Elon Musk, said that because the launch of the new Falcon Heavy vehicle was risky, it would carry the "silliest thing we can imagine".

In June 2017, one of his Twitter followers suggested that the silly thing be a Tesla Model S, to which Musk replied: "Suggestions welcome!"

In December 2017, Musk announced that the payload would be his personal "midnight cherry Tesla Roadster".

One of the test flight objectives was to demonstrate that the new rocket could carry a payload as far as the orbit of Mars. NASA deputy administrator Lori Garver stated that SpaceX had "offered free launches to NASA, Air Force etc. but got no takers", and that "the Tesla gimmick was the backup".

The Roadster is the first standard roadworthy vehicle sent into space, following several special-purpose lunar and Mars rovers.

=== Roadster as payload ===
The Roadster is permanently attached to the upper stage of the Falcon Heavy rocket.

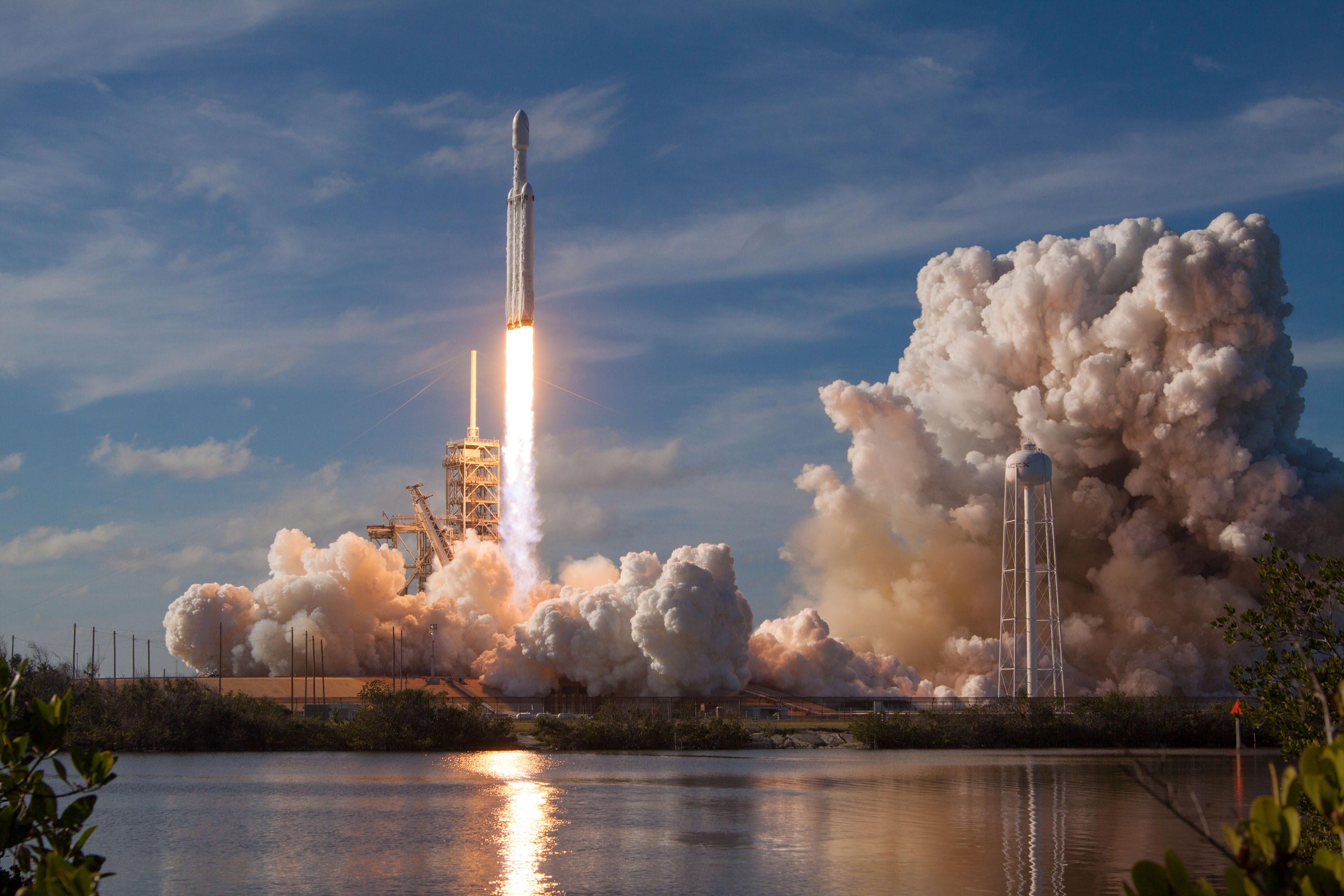
Falcon Heavy liftoff from pad LC-39A

The car was permanently mounted on the rocket in an inclined position above the payload adapter. Tubular structures were added to mount front and side cameras. Photos of the car prior to payload encapsulation were released.

Positioned in the driver's seat is "Starman", a full-scale human mannequin clad in a SpaceX pressure spacesuit. It was placed with the right hand on the steering wheel and the left elbow resting on the open window sill. The mannequin was named after the David Bowie song "Starman", and the car's sound system was set before launch to continuously loop the Bowie song "Space Oddity".

A copy of Douglas Adams' novel The Hitchhiker's Guide to the Galaxy is in the glove box, along with references to the book in the form of a towel and a sign on the dashboard that reads "DON'T PANIC!".

A Hot Wheels miniature Roadster with a miniature Starman is mounted on the dashboard. A plaque bearing the names of the employees who worked on the project is placed underneath the car, and a message on the vehicle's circuit board reads "Made on Earth by humans". The car carries a copy of Isaac Asimov's Foundation trilogy on a 5D optical disc, a proof of concept for high-density long-lasting data storage, donated to Musk by the Arch Mission Foundation.

== Trajectory ==
An animation of the Roadster's trajectory: SpaceX Roadster; Sun; Mercury / Venus; Earth; Mars

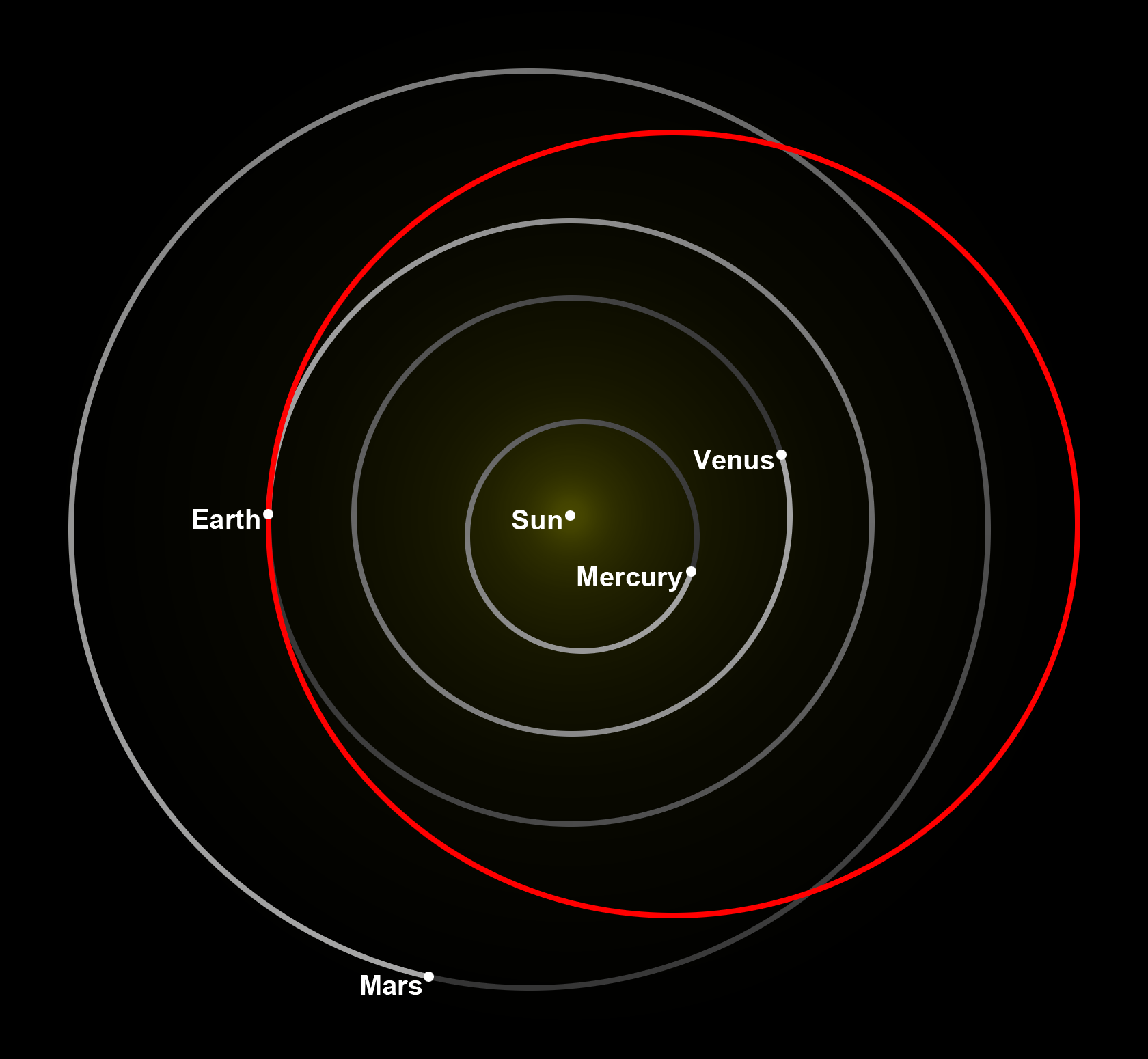
Orbit of the Roadster, with the planets of the inner Solar System for context. Its aphelion is ~250 million kilometres (1.66 au).

The US Office of Commercial Space Transportation issued the test flight's launch license on February 2, 2018. The rocket lifted off from Launch Complex 39A at Kennedy Space Center at 15:45 EST (20:45 UTC) on February 6. The upper stage supporting the car was initially placed in an Earth parking orbit. It spent six hours coasting through the Van Allen radiation belts, thereby demonstrating a new capability requested by the U.S. Air Force for direct insertion of heavy intelligence satellites into geostationary orbit. Then, the upper stage performed a second boost to reach the desired escape trajectory.

The launch was live streamed, and video feeds from space showed the Roadster at various angles, with Earth in the background, thanks to cameras placed inside and outside the car, on booms attached to the vehicle's custom adaptor atop the upper stage. Musk had estimated the car's battery would last over 12 hours, but the live stream ran for just over four hours, thus ending before the final boost out of Earth orbit. The images were released by SpaceX into the public domain on their Flickr account.

Following the launch, the rocket stage carrying the car was given the Satellite Catalog Number 43205, named "TESLA ROADSTER/FALCON 9H", along with the COSPAR designation 2018-017A. The JPL Horizons system publishes solutions for the trajectory as target body "-143205".

The Roadster is in a heliocentric orbit that crosses the orbit of Mars and reaches a distance of 1.66 au from the Sun. With an inclination of roughly 1 degree to the ecliptic plane, compared to Mars' 1.85° inclination, this trajectory by design cannot intercept Mars, so the car will neither fly by Mars nor enter an orbit around Mars. This was the second object launched by SpaceX to leave Earth orbit, after the DSCOVR mission to the Earth–Sun L_{1} Lagrangian point. Nine months after launch, the Tesla had travelled beyond the orbit of Mars, reaching aphelion at 12:48 UTC on November 9, 2018, at a distance of 248,892,559 km (1.664 au) from the Sun. The maximum speed of the car relative to the Sun will be approximately 121,000 km/h (75,000 mph) at perihelion.

Even if the rocket had targeted an actual Mars transfer orbit, the car could not have been placed into orbit around Mars, because the upper stage that carries it is not equipped with the necessary propellant, maneuvering, and communications capabilities. This flight simply demonstrated that Falcon Heavy is capable of launching significant payloads towards Mars in potential future missions.

== Cultural impact ==
The car in space quickly became a topic for Internet memes. Western Australia Police distributed a picture of a radar gun aimed at the Roadster whilst above Australia. Škoda produced a parody video of a Škoda Superb being driven to Mars, a village in central France. An attempt was made by Donut Media to launch a Hot Wheels Tesla Model X to the stratosphere using a weather balloon. ToSky, a Russian start-up, sent a scale model of a Soviet-era Lada carrying a mannequin of Roscosmos head Dmitry Rogozin to an altitude of 20 km (12 miles) to gather test data for the design of stratostats.

Some news reports observed a similarity between the real pictures of a car orbiting the Earth and the title sequence of the animated cult classic film Heavy Metal (1981), where a space traveler lands on Earth in a 1950s two-seater Chevrolet Corvette convertible.

The SpaceX launch live stream reached over 2.3 million concurrent viewers on YouTube, which made it the second most watched live event on the platform, behind another space-related event: Felix Baumgartner's jump from the stratosphere in 2012.

== Reactions ==
The choice of the Roadster as a dummy payload was variously interpreted as marketing for Tesla, or a work of art, with some worrying about the risk to contamination of otherwise sterile solar system bodies.

=== Marketing ===
Musk was lauded as a savvy marketer and brand manager by controlling both the timing and the content of his corporate public relations. After the launch, Scientific American said using a car was not entirely pointless, in the sense that something of that size and weight was necessary for a meaningful test.

Advertising Age agreed with Business Insider that the Roadster space launch was the "greatest ever car commercial without a dime spent on advertising", demonstrating that Musk is "miles ahead of the rest" in reaching young consumers, where "mere mortals scrabble about spending millions to fight each other over seconds of air time", Musk "just executes his vision." Alex Hern, technology reporter for The Guardian, said the choice to launch a car was a "hybrid of genuine breakthrough and nerd-baiting publicity stunt" without "any real point beyond generating good press pics", which should not detract from the much more important technological milestone represented by the launch of the rocket itself.

Lori Garver, a former NASA deputy director, initially said the choice of payload for the Falcon Heavy maiden flight is a gimmick and a loss of opportunity to further advance science—but later said that SpaceX had offered free launches that drew no takers.

Musk responded to the critics by stating he wanted to inspire the public about the "possibility of something new happening in space," as part of his larger vision for spreading humanity to other planets.

=== Work of art ===
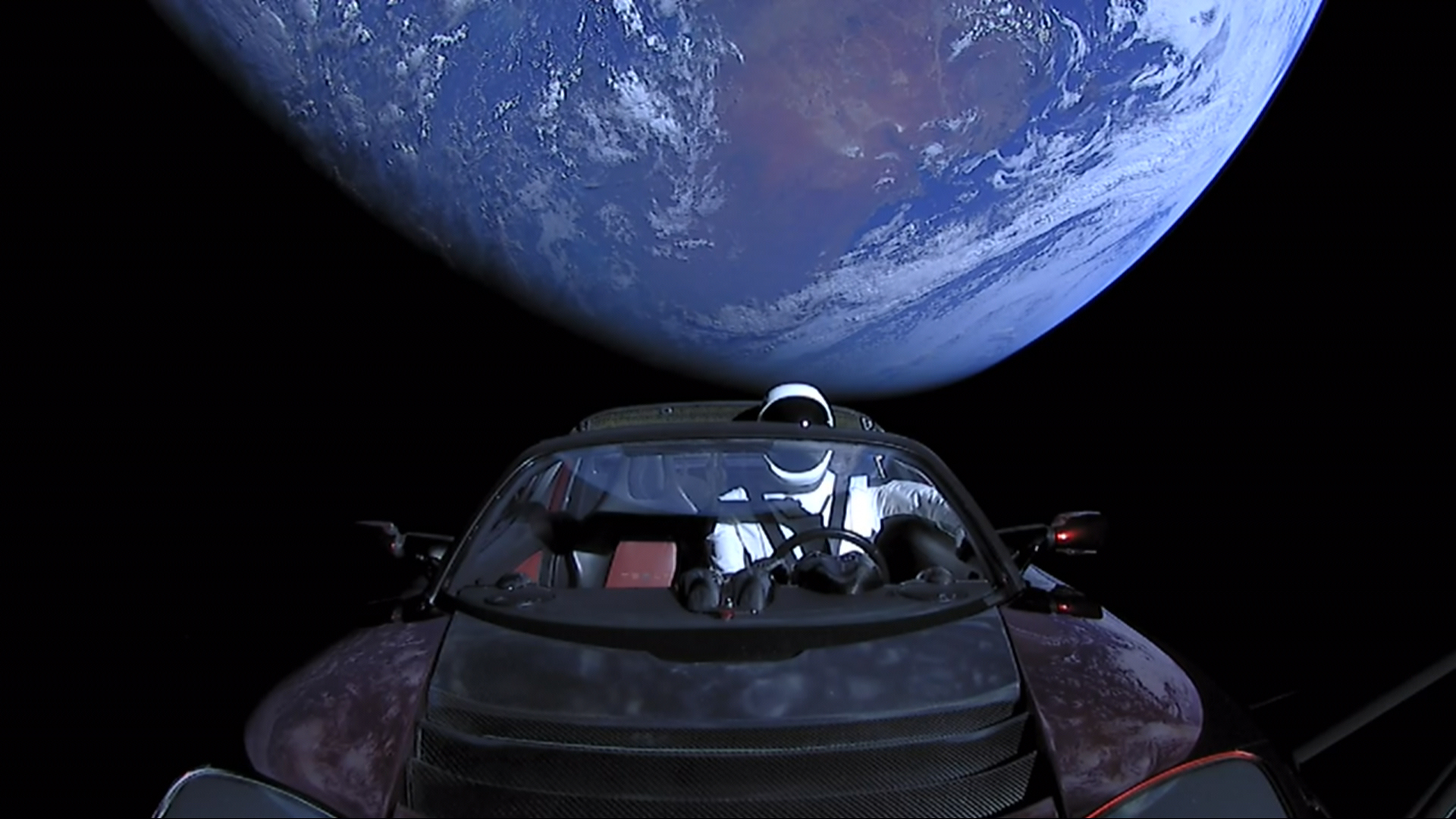
Musk's Roadster mounted to a Falcon Heavy rocket

The Verge likened the Roadster to a "ready-made" work of art, such as Marcel Duchamp's 1917 piece Fountain, created by placing an everyday object in an unusual position, context and orientation.

Alice Gorman, a lecturer in archaeology and space studies at Flinders University in Australia, said that the Roadster's primary purpose is symbolic communication, that "the red sports car symbolises masculinity – power, wealth and speed – but also how fragile masculinity is". Drawing on anthropological theories of symbols, she argues that "the car is also an armour against dying, a talisman that quells a profound fear of mortality". Gorman wrote that "the spacesuit is also about death. ... The Starman was never alive, but now he's haunting space".

=== Space debris non-risk ===
Orbital debris expert Darren McKnight stated that the car poses no risk because it is far from Earth orbit. He added: "The enthusiasm and interest that [Musk] generates more than offsets the infinitesimally small 'littering' of the cosmos." Tommy Sanford, director of the Commercial Spaceflight Federation, said that the car and its rocket stage are no more "space junk" than the mundane material usually launched on other test flights. Mass simulators are often deliberately placed in a graveyard orbit or sent on a deep space trajectory, where they are not a hazard.

=== Bacteriological contamination ===
The Planetary Society was concerned that launching a non-sterile object to interplanetary space may risk biological contamination of a foreign world. Scientists at Purdue University noted that the vehicle will be sterilized by solar radiation over time and the vehicle is most likely to hit the Earth in the future, though some bacteria might survive on some components of the vehicle which could contaminate Mars in the distant future if it were to hit Mars instead.

== Orbit tracking ==
The car and the upper stage were passivated by intentionally removing remaining chemical and electrical energy, at which point they ceased transmitting telemetry. The car was observed by Australian astronomer Peter Starr using a 0.43m Planewave telescope at Dubbo Observatory, NSW. Based on these observations and refinement of the orbit, a close re-encounter with Earth (originally predicted for 2073) is not possible. In October 2020 the car made a close approach to Mars, about 8 million kilometres (5 million miles) away, at which distance Mars's gravity had no significant effect on the Roadster's orbit.

The Virtual Telescope Project observed the Tesla two days after its launch, where it had an apparent magnitude of 15.5, comparable to that of Pluto's moon Charon. The Roadster was automatically spotted and logged by the Asteroid Terrestrial-impact Last Alert System (ATLAS) telescope operated by the University of Hawaiʻi. The car was observed by the Deimos Sky Survey (DeSS) at a distance of 720,000 km (450,000 mi) with a flashing effect suggesting spinning.

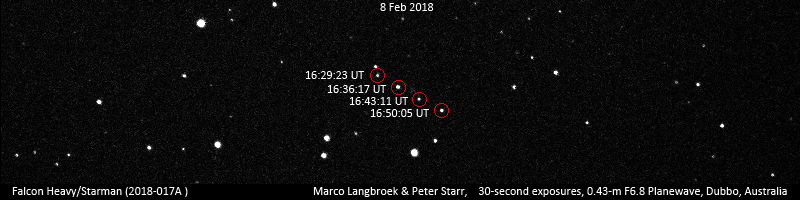
Roadster photographed with a 0.43 m telescope of Dubbo Observatory in Australia, on 8 February 2018, 16:39–16:50 UTC, at a distance of 550,000 km (1.4 Lunar distances) from Earth. Varying brightness suggests spinning.

Through measuring changes in apparent brightness of the object, astronomers have determined that the Roadster is rotating with a period of 4.7589 ± 0.0060 minutes (i.e. 4 minutes, 46 seconds). By February 11, 2018, astrometry measurements from 241 independent observations had been collated, refining the positions to within one-tenth of an arcsecond and published by the SeeSat-L mailing list, a group of amateur satellite spotters—more accurate than for most observations of objects in space.

In 2025, the object was erroneously parsed as a new asteroid by a citizen astronomer going through archival Catalina Sky Survey data and given the designation 2018 CN41 by the Minor Planet Center. The object was correctly identified as the roadster eighteen hours later and deleted from the Minor Planet Center's archives.

=== Predictions ===
The roadster made its first close approach to Mars on October 7, 2020. The next close approach to Earth will be in the year 2047 at a distance of 5 million kilometers, about 13 times the distance between Earth and the Moon. Simulations over a 3-million-year timespan found a probability of the Roadster colliding with Earth at approximately 6%, or with Venus at approximately 2.5%. These probabilities of collision are similar to those of other near-Earth objects. The half-life for the tested orbits was calculated as approximately 20 million years, but with trajectories varying significantly following a close approach to the Earth–Moon system in 2091.

Musk had originally speculated that the car could drift in space for a billion years. According to chemist William Carroll, solar radiation, cosmic radiation, and micrometeoroid impacts will structurally degrade the car over time. Radiation will eventually break down any material with carbon–carbon bonds, including carbon fiber parts. Tires, paint, plastic and leather might have lasted only about a year, while carbon fiber parts will last considerably longer. Eventually, only the aluminum frame, inert metals, and glass not shattered by meteoroids will remain.

=== Potential follow up mission ===
In August 2019, as the Roadster completed its first orbit around the Sun, Musk stated that SpaceX may one day launch a small spacecraft or Starship to catch up with the Roadster and take photographs or even return it to Earth for studying solar erosion on it just as Apollo 12 did with Surveyor 3 lander's components.

== See also ==
- List of artificial objects in heliocentric orbit
- List of passive satellites
