= Susan Cianciolo =

American fashion designer

Susan Cianciolo (born 1969) is a fashion designer and artist.

== Education and life ==
Cianciolo grew up in Providence, Rhode Island where she was raised in an Italian-American household of four generations. In her late teens, she moved to New York City and in 1992 she earned her BFA from the Parsons School of Design. She now lives in Brooklyn, New York with her daughter Lilac Sky Cianciolo, with whom she regularly collaborates. As a young adult Cianciolo worked various jobs within New York's creative sector. She created the window displays at the Bergdorf Goodman Building, worked as a graphic designer, illustrator, and for many fashion brands including Geoffrey Beene and X-Girl, the fashion line of Kim Gordon from the band Sonic Youth.

== Work and career ==
Cianciolo founded the Run Collection in 1995, a fashion line of hand crafted clothing made from found or recycled garments and textiles. Between 1995 and 2006, she released 11 collections from which selected pieces have been featured at Barneys and several other retailers and fashion magazines such as Vogue. In 2006, she collaborated with Cone Denim, a heritage mill in South Carolina, to release a collection of garments accompanied by two shows in New York and Los Angeles and a book, The Women of the Crowd, published by Printed Matter. Cianciolo taught at the Parsons School of Design from 2008 to 2011. Since at least 2015, she has been teaching fashion design and illustration at Pratt Institute.

Cianciolo identifies as "a designer who also makes art, and a conceptual artist who occasionally designs clothes" and has frequently pursued venues outside of the runway for her fashion to be exhibited including theater plays, musical productions, and video works. She continues to create iterations of her initial fashion concepts in new forms such as the Run Home Collection and the Run Restaurant. In 2001, the Run Restaurant took place in Alleged Galleries in the Meatpacking District of New York City. The month long project transformed the gallery into an eclectic restaurant with handmade decor and affordable meals prepared by the artist and her friends. Cianciolo installed a version of Run Restaurant for the 2017 Whitney Biennial in the Whitney Museum's Eatery Untitled in collaboration with chef Michael Anthony. In the 2016 Berlin Biennale, Cianciolo exhibited as part of the Melbourne-based fashion exhibition space Centre for Style. Cianciolo exhibits at Bridget Donahue in New York and 356 Mission in Los Angeles.

== Exhibitions (selection) ==
- 2019 Martina Simeti, Milano, IT (solo)
- 2019 South London Gallery, London, UK (solo)
- 2017 Bridget Donahue, New York, NY (solo)
- 2017 Frieze Art Fair, New York, NY
- 2017 Modern Art, London, UK (solo)
- 2017 Whitney Museum of American Art, New York, NY
- 2016 Yale Union, Portland, OR (solo)
- 2016 356 S. Mission Road, Los Angeles, CA (solo)
- 2016 The Swiss Institute, New York, NY
- 2016 Interstate Projects, New York, NY
- 2016 White Columns, New York, NY
- 2015 Bridget Donahue, New York, NY (solo)
- 2015 MoMA PS1, Long Island City, NY
- 2001 Alleged Gallery, New York, NY (solo)
