= Memory of Mankind =

Preservation project in Hallstatt, Austria

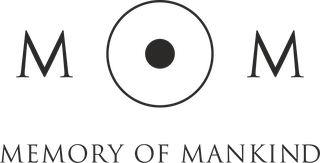

- Location within Europe
- Alternative names: MOM

General information
- Status: Running
- Type: Salt mine
- Location: Upper Austria, Hallstatt, Austria
- Coordinates: 47.563428°N 13.637606°E
- Groundbreaking: 2012

Website
- memory-of-mankind.com

Memory of Mankind (MOM) is a preservation project founded by Martin Kunze in Hallstatt, Austria, in 2012. Its main goal is to preserve knowledge about present human civilization from oblivion and collective amnesia. Information is printed on ceramic tablets and stored in the local salt mine. The project aims to create the "time capsule of our era", letting anyone participate by allowing them to submit texts and images. In contrast to national archives, content for MOM is collected by those who take part, and it constitutes a collective, "bottom-up" history.

== History ==
The project was started by ceramicist Martin Kunze. His earliest experience with a time capsule was in the early 1980s, when, as a 13-year-old, he buried a bottle at a beach with a message containing his name and phone number. Thirty years later, someone found it.

Circa 2008, Kunze read Alan Weisman's nonfiction work The World Without Us, which included the claim that ceramic objects had the greatest chance to survive into the future. This, coupled with the knowledge that the internet already contributed 2% of CO_{2} emissions, led Kunze to think about a ceramic time capsule. Part of the inspiration came from an art project by a classmate, who had written "feminine experiences" on ceramic tablets.

In 2012, the Memory of Mankind started with the first tablet, which had a greeting to future finders, an explanation about the project, and a date expressed in terms of astronomical events. By 2018, the project had over 500 tablets.

== Ambitions ==
The primary ambition of MOM is to preserve an image of the current era, created by numerous participants from all over the planet. It also intends to contain information that our society is obligated to forward to the future, e.g., descriptions of nuclear waste repositories. MOM collaborates with the nuclear agency NEA and the Swedish nuclear waste company SKB.

The project is also intended as a critique of our digital civilization. According to Kunze, nothing of the 21st century may last in the future, since most of our interactions are now virtual. The conflict of accuracy is one of the main themes of the MOM project. The project aims to save a fragment of the information produced until today, Kunze says, but this fragment has to be representative.

The project is open to the public, and its creator emphasizes that it is not a "doomsday project".

== Content ==
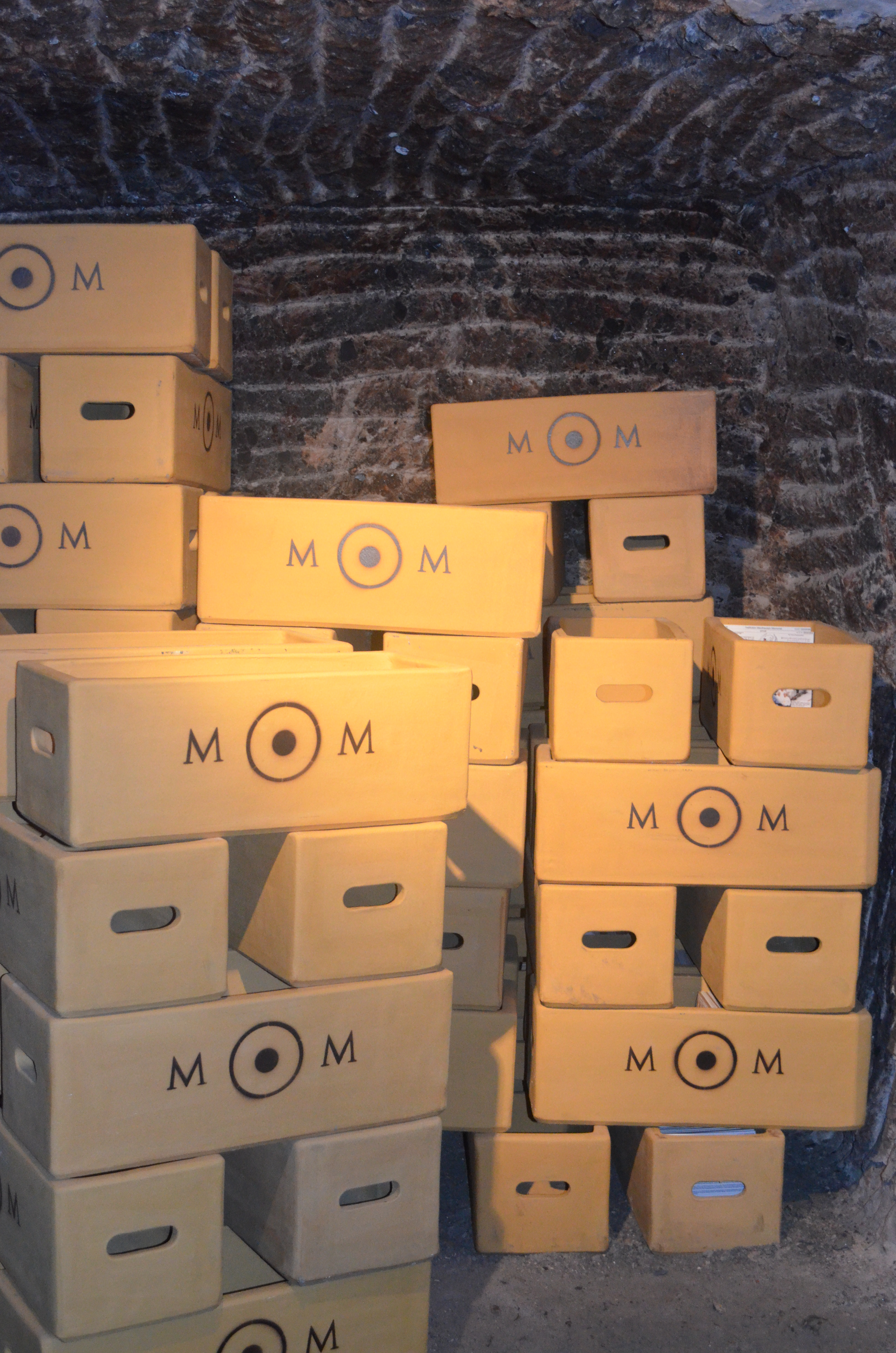
MOM containers in the salt mine

Collecting content for the MOM is subject to bias. In order to take this into account, it is split into three sections, and as much meta-information as necessary is added to any contribution in order to enable future finders to apply source criticism. The collecting process is not centralized, and it is specifically relevant to each country/region/entity.

The three sections are:

- Individual content: content uploaded by individuals, accompanied by a declaration of why this particular text is worthy of preservation. Each individual upload is marked as "private content" in the overall MOM index;
- General content: content collected automatically to avoid bias, e.g., collecting the daily editorials of newspapers worldwide, randomly selected Facebook profiles, weekly/monthly magazines on different topics (with the "meta-information": numbers of readers; reason for selecting the respective magazine; description of the target group). A language-deciphering tool is also part of this section;
- Specific content: in this section, MOM is used as a "medium". Outside institutions bring content to MOM and use the storage and ceramic microfilm. Examples include the nuclear industry (information about waste repositories) or universities, which use MOM for awards.

== Salt mine ==
The Hallstatt salt mine is the oldest continuously exploited by humans. Several factors contribute to its suitability for the MOM archives: as well as the depth and relative stability of the mine, the salt absorbs moisture and dries the air, and it has a natural plasticity that helps to seal cracks and fractures, keeping the caverns watertight.

The geology dictates that over hundreds of thousands of years, the archive will rise to the surface. Since the mouth of the cavern closes at about the rate of human fingernail growth, the project has about 40 years to be completed. Under Austrian law, the archive is considered to be "like waste", and ownerless.

== Ceramic data carriers ==
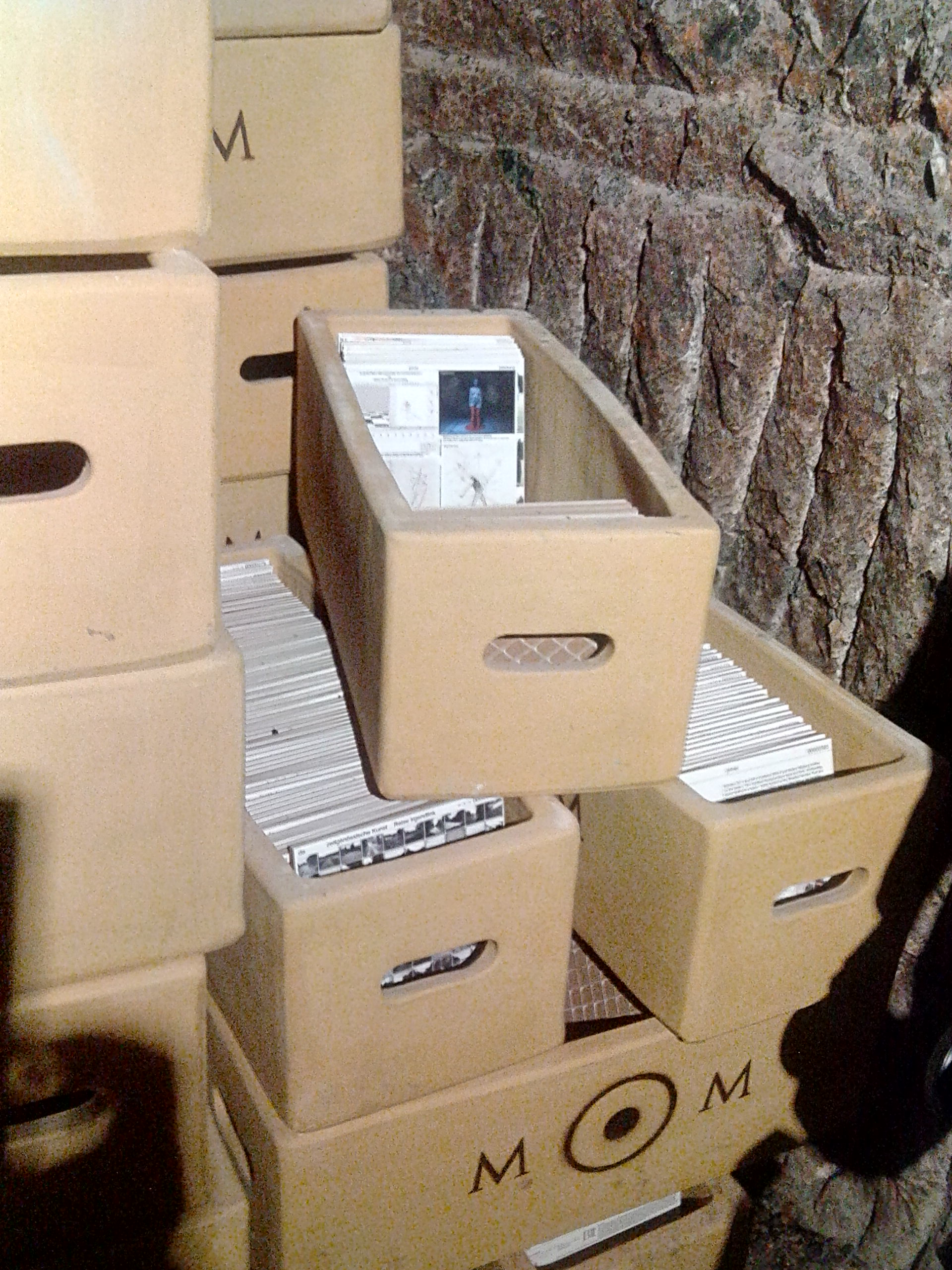
Ceramic tablets in their containers

Ancient Sumerian clay tablets inspired those used by MOM. These modern variants are made of a ceramic material that is capable of preserving the information that they contain, as it is less vulnerable to corrosion, biological degradation, and ordinary weathering, and lasts for a longer time than other materials that have been used to record information—it resists temperatures of up to 1,200 °C (2,200 °F), chemicals, water, radiation, magnetism and pressure, and can "only be destroyed by a hammer" (even if a tablet breaks, information will not disappear). The goal is to have the most durable support available, able to carry the message over a long span of time (e.g., one million years).

The tablets measure 20x20 cm. One type carries images and text with a 300 dpi resolution, while the other type is "ceramic microfilm" and carries up to 5 million characters. It is required that the information be analog and recognizable as data to future finders.

Variations of languages over time and even the hypothesis of an alien intelligence discovering the MOM archives have been anticipated. Again, the creators of MOM take inspiration from historical methods. They designed their own "Rosetta Stone", translated into several languages with the appropriate character set and number system, an astronomical time indicating "2013" (via extremely rare events of simultaneous transits of Mercury and Venus), and thousands of images depicting concrete situations with the corresponding words, completed by the theoretical volumes of the main languages, e.g., phrases, grammar, thesauruses, and orthography.

== Token and ceremonial gathering ==
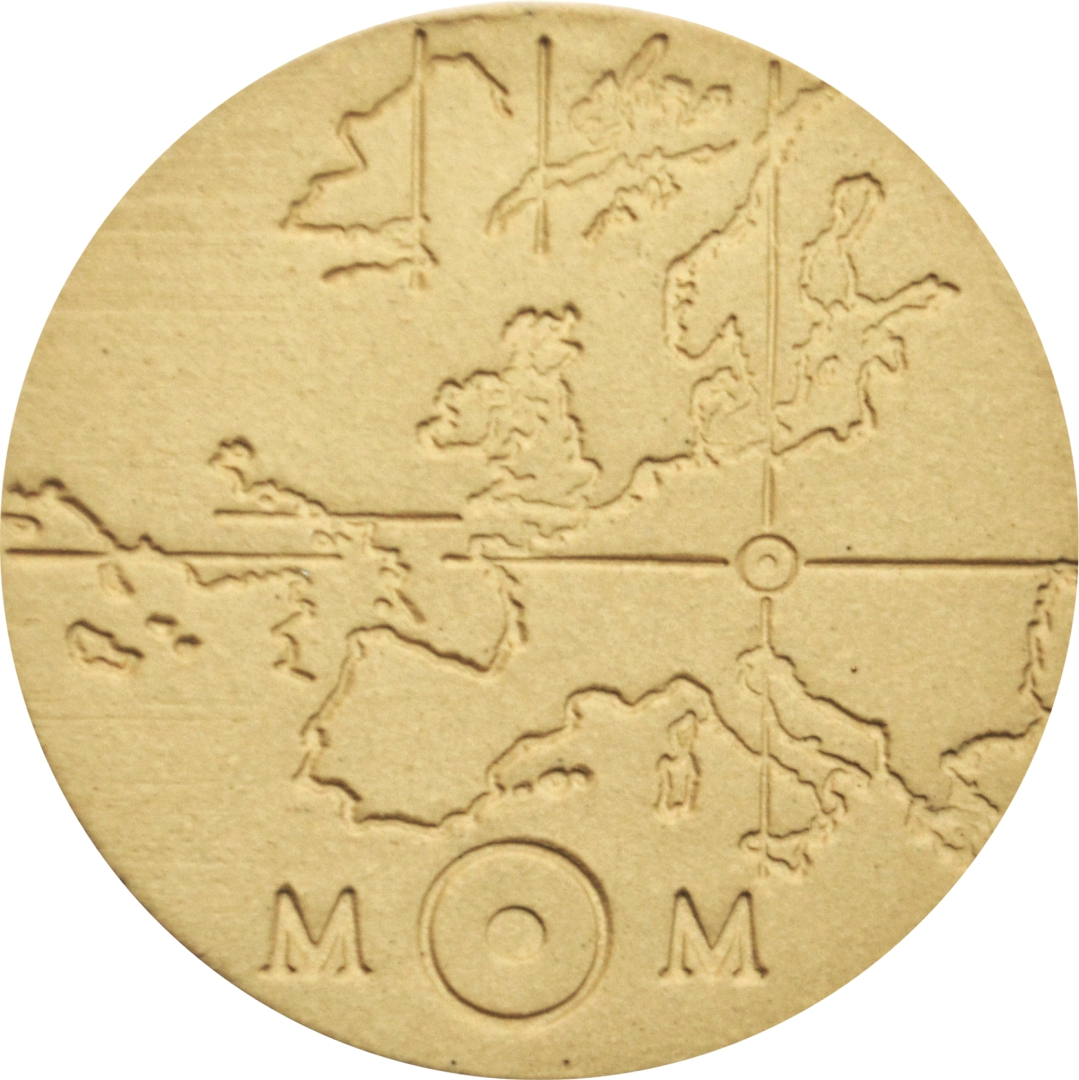
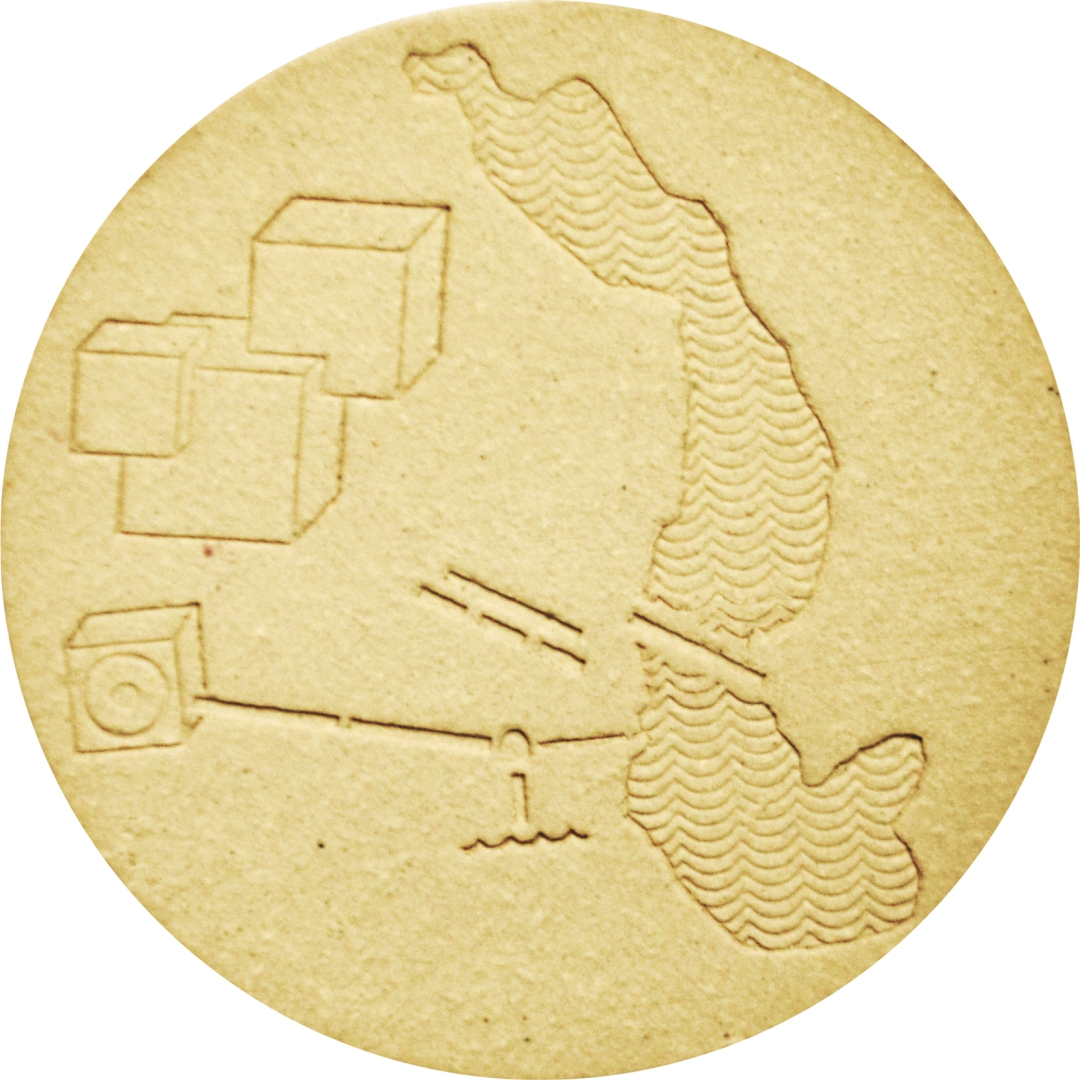
Obverse (left) and reverse (right) of the token given to participants of the MOM project

A token (a disc 6,5 cm in diameter) is given to all participants of the MOM project. On its surface, the token indicates a place on Earth with a precision of some ten meters. The front side depicts the outline of Europe, with a mark representing Hallstatt's location. The back shows the position of the entrance to the MOM relative to the shape of Hallstatt lake. In addition, a multi-cubic shape representing the crystalline structure of the mine's salt is included. Due to the design of MOM and the token, the archive can only be retrieved by a society with a similar technical and physical understanding of the world to modern-era humans. This is intended to ensure that techniques to decode the content are available to future finders.

An "Ariadne's thread" in the form of ceramic tablets with mathematical indications of the direction and depth will be placed in the entrance tunnel, including "gaps", which are also mathematically indicated, in order to avoid accidental recovery by an immature society.

An instruction for a rite is attached to this token: the owners are supposed to gather every 50 years to commemorate and decide whether humanity still knows the content of MOM and if extensions are needed. The token should be transmitted to the descendants of the owners.

Unlike other time capsules, which predefine opening dates (not considering if at that point an appropriate addressee will exist), MOM's token defines the culture rather than the date of the opening by ensuring a pre-mature society would be unable to interpret the token.

== Crowdfunding aspect ==
Memory of Mankind distinguishes itself by asking for contributions from both public and private entities, be they companies or common people. Contributions can be financial or content to be stored. Cooking recipes and personal stories are examples of contributions that may be stored. In exchange for a contribution above a certain character minimum, the contributor receives one of the ceramic tokens.

== Cost ==
MOM is a global project: in order to enable citizens of every country to represent themselves, the price of the tablets varies based on the donor's gross national income per capita-ranking table of the World Bank.

== Gallery ==
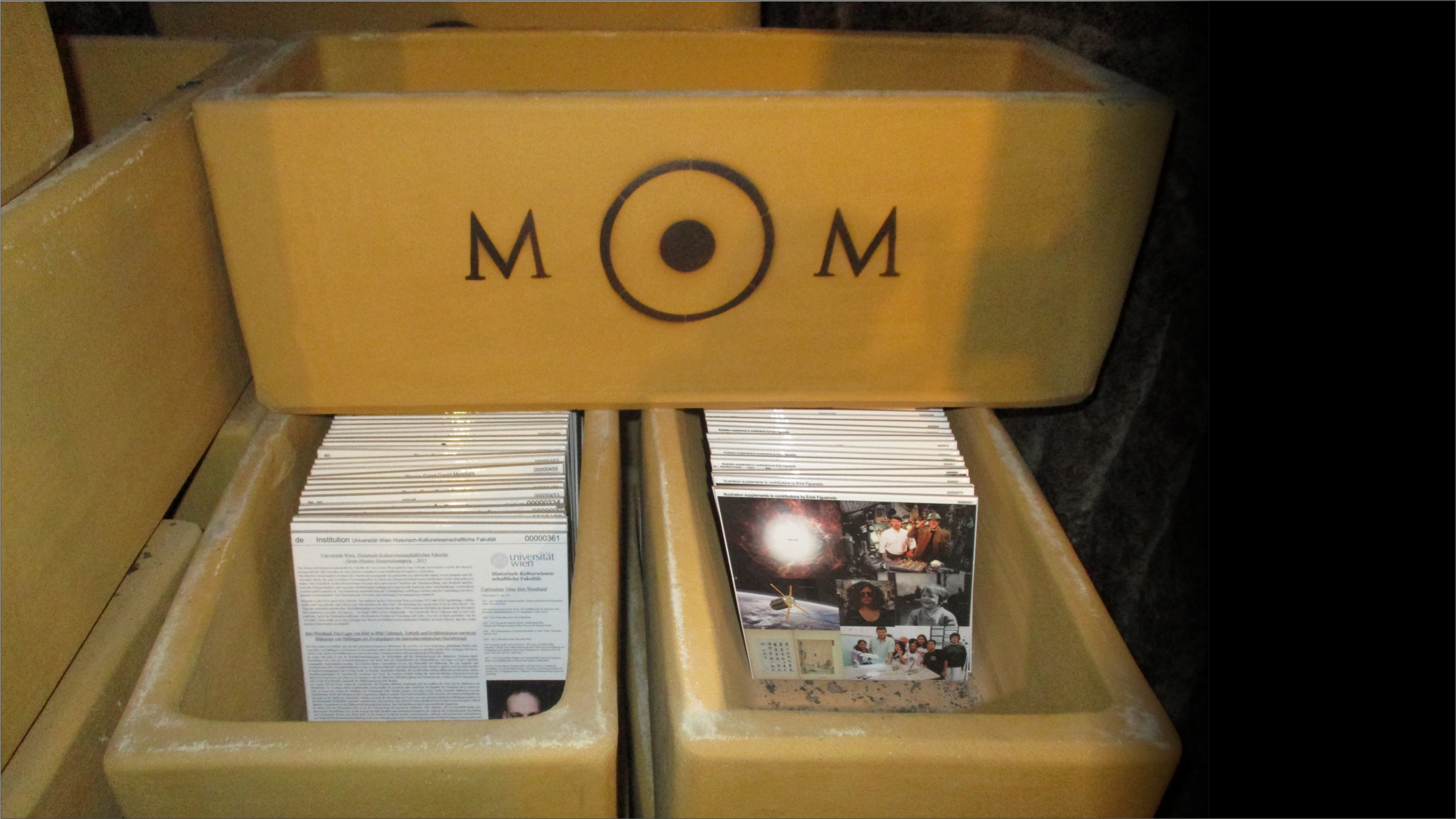
Container with tablets

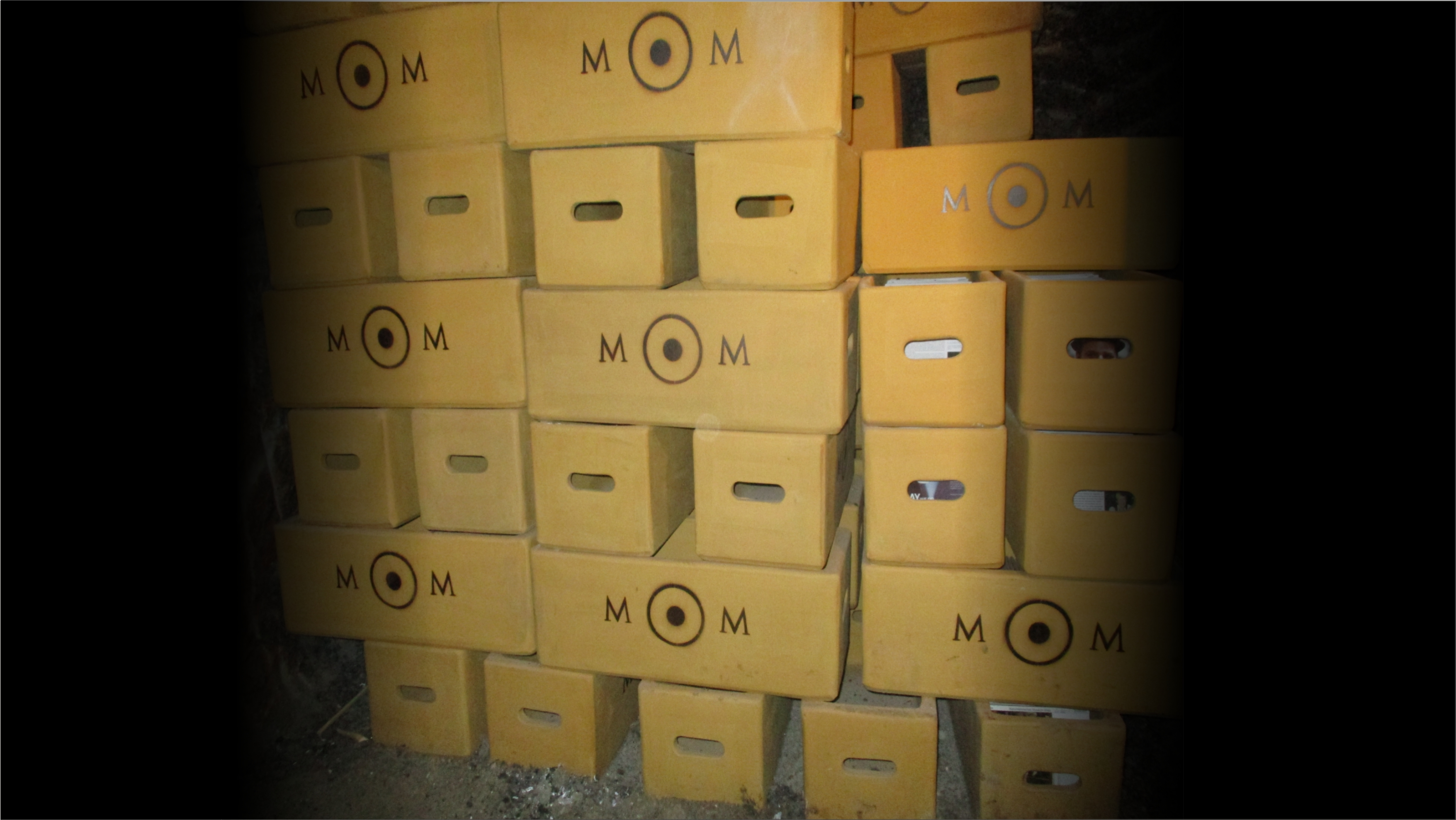
Container with tablets 2

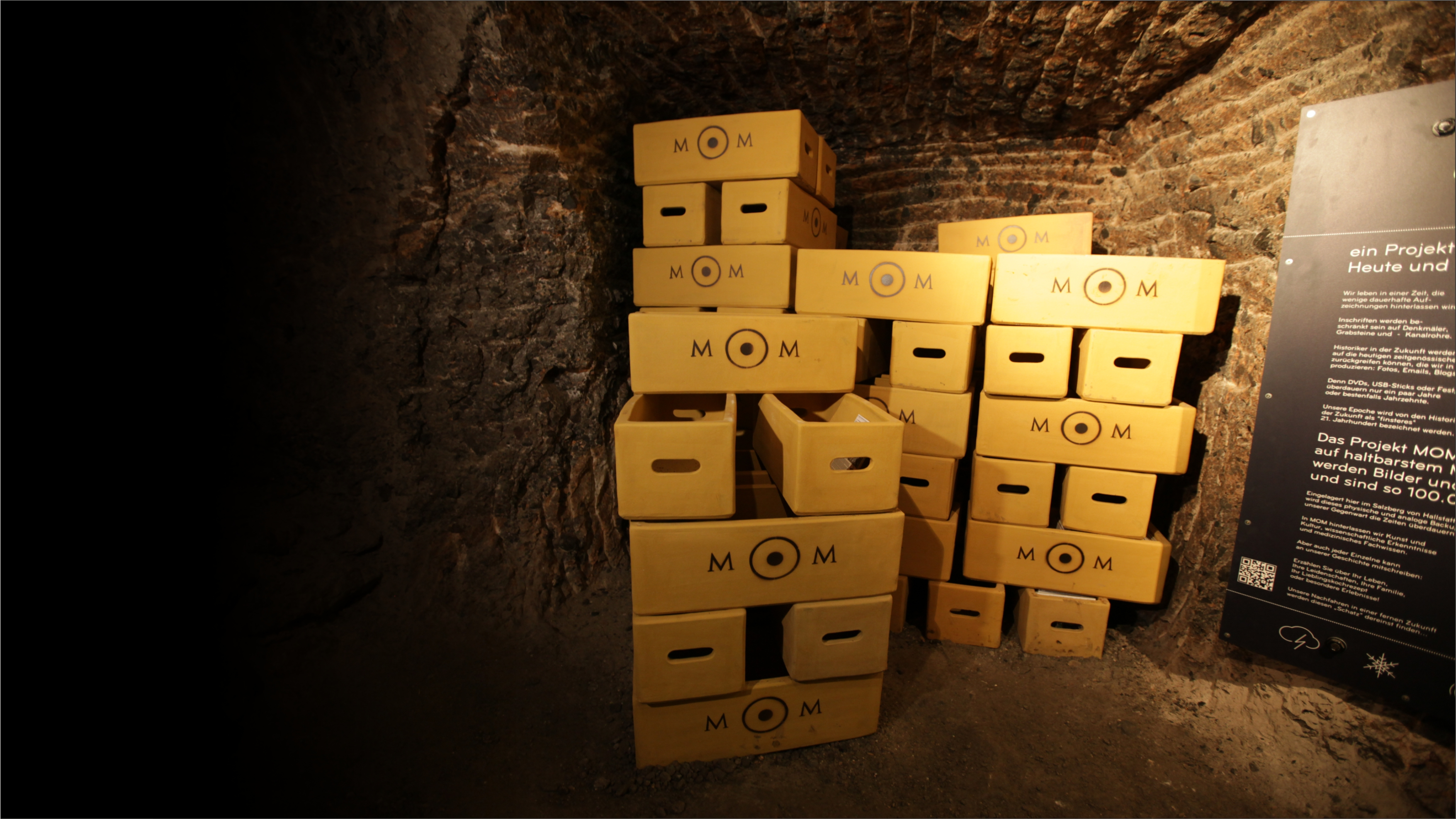
Container with tablets 3

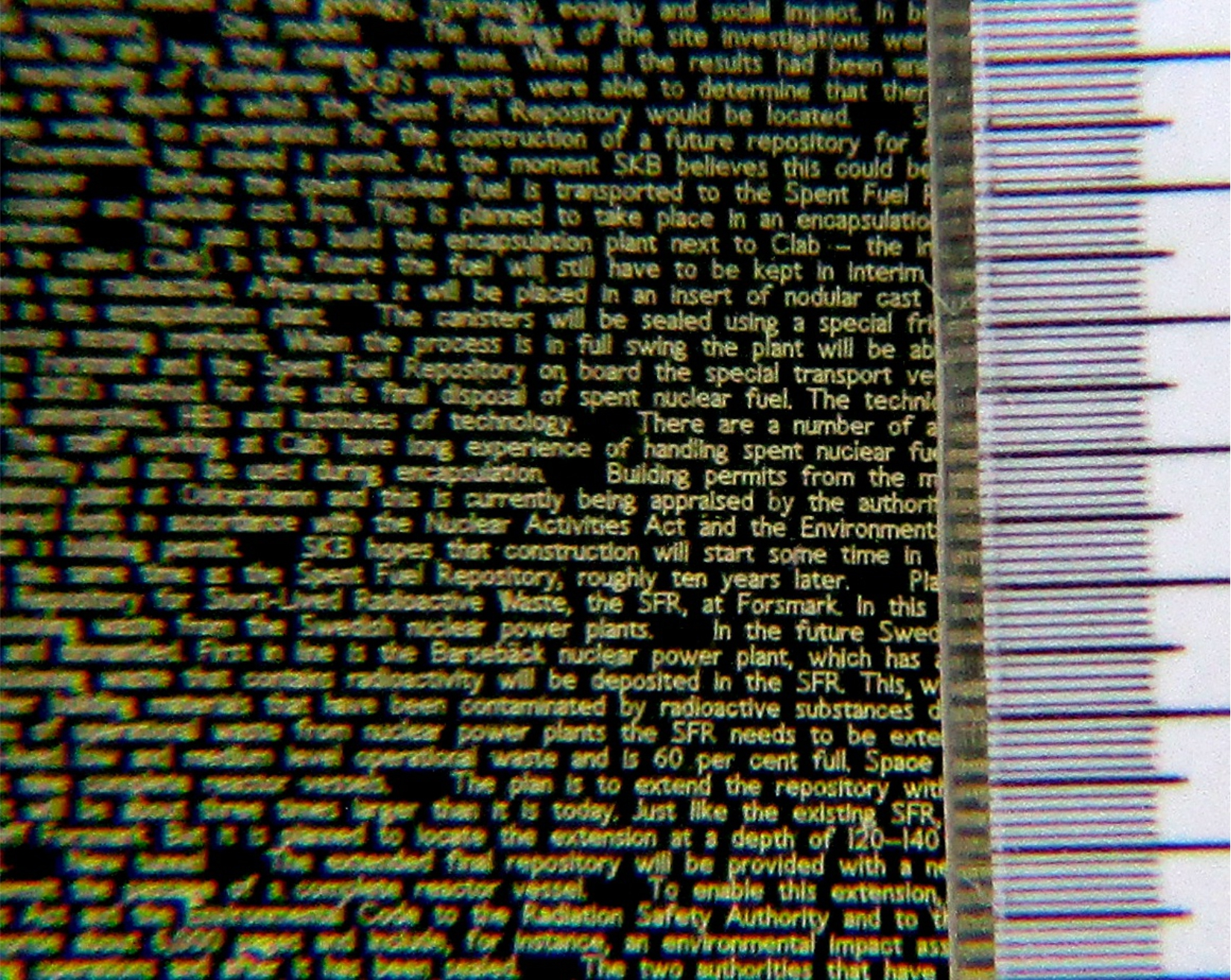
Example of the ceramic microfilm

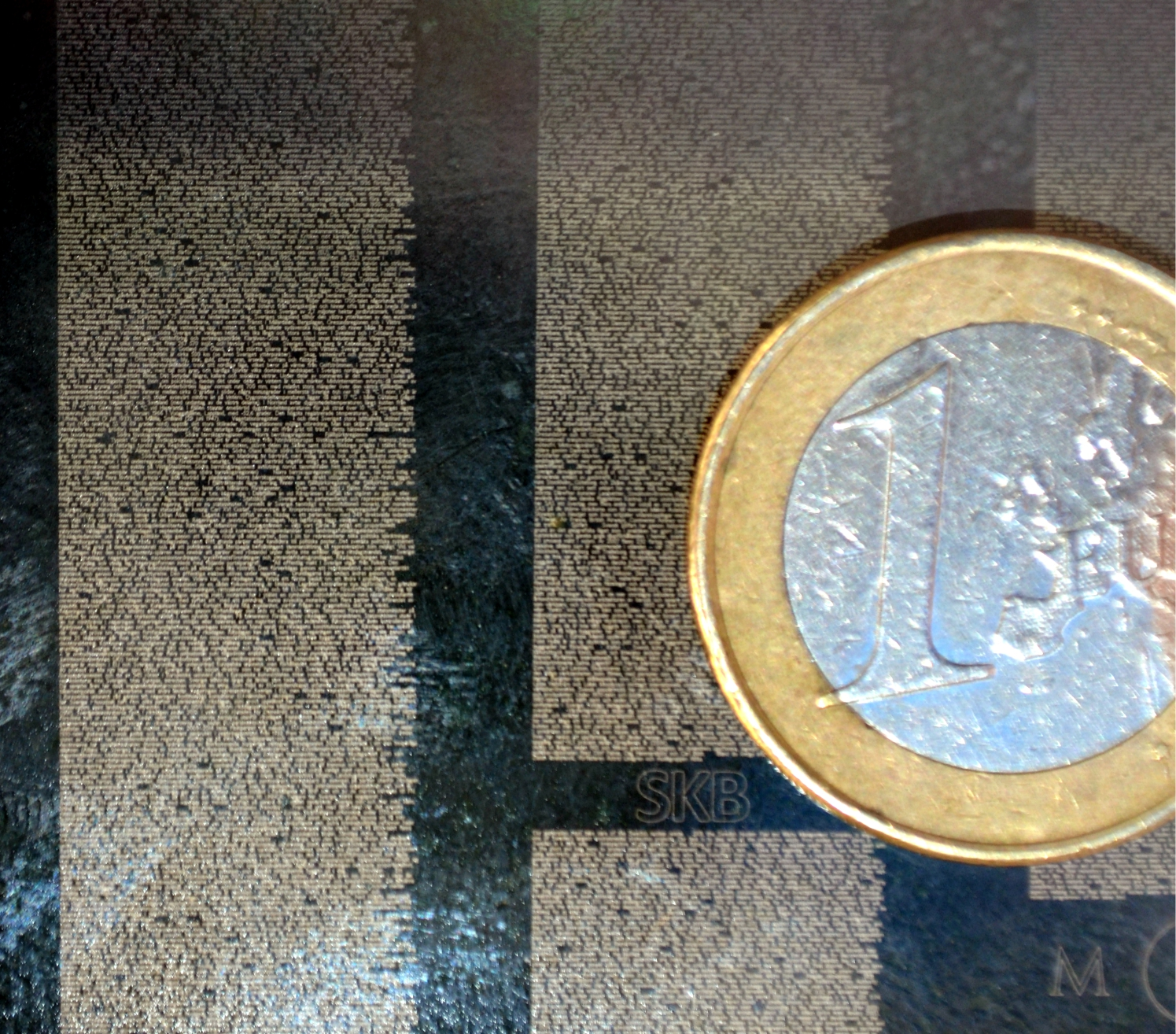
Microfilm view, with coin for size comparison

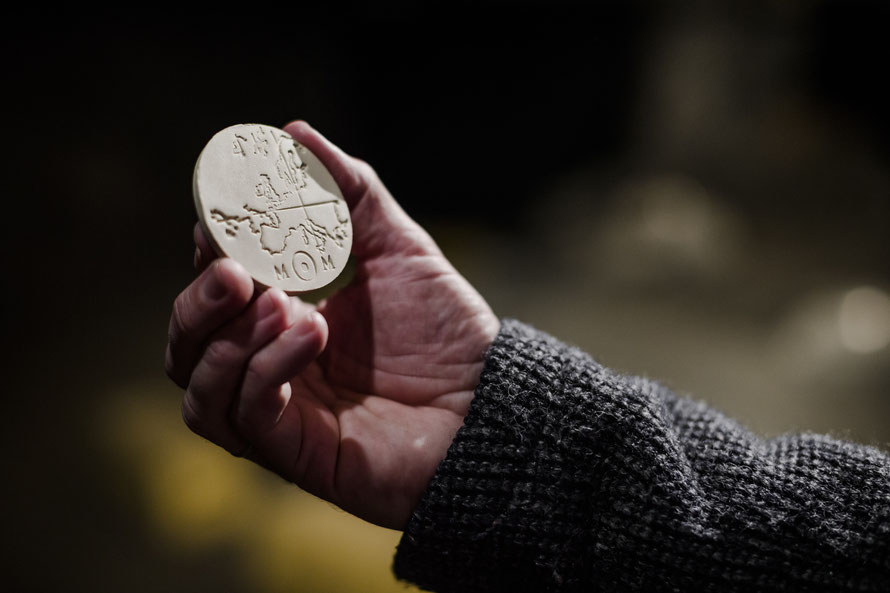
Token

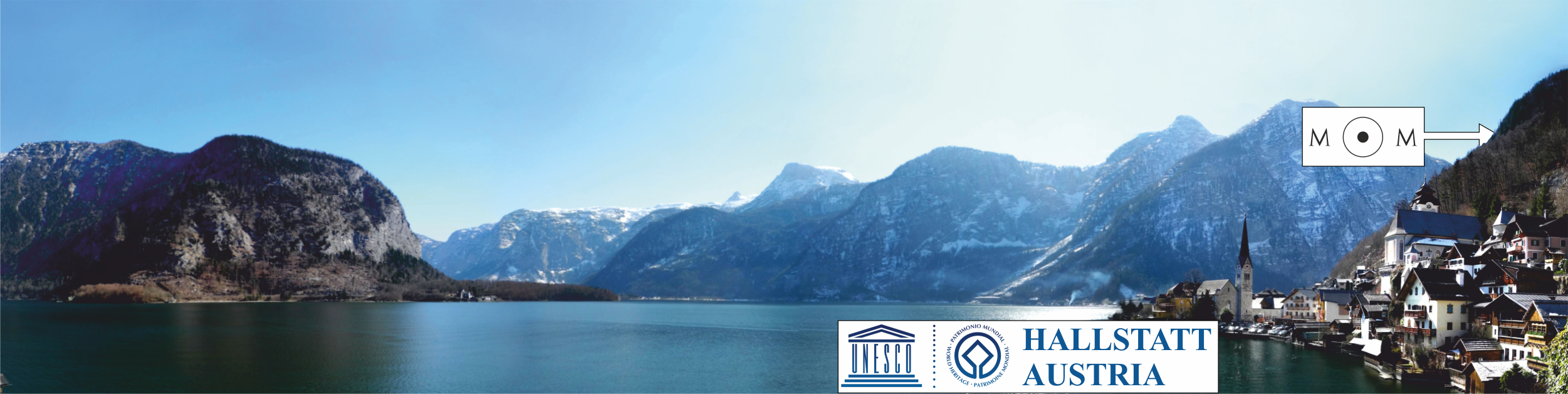
View of Hallstatt

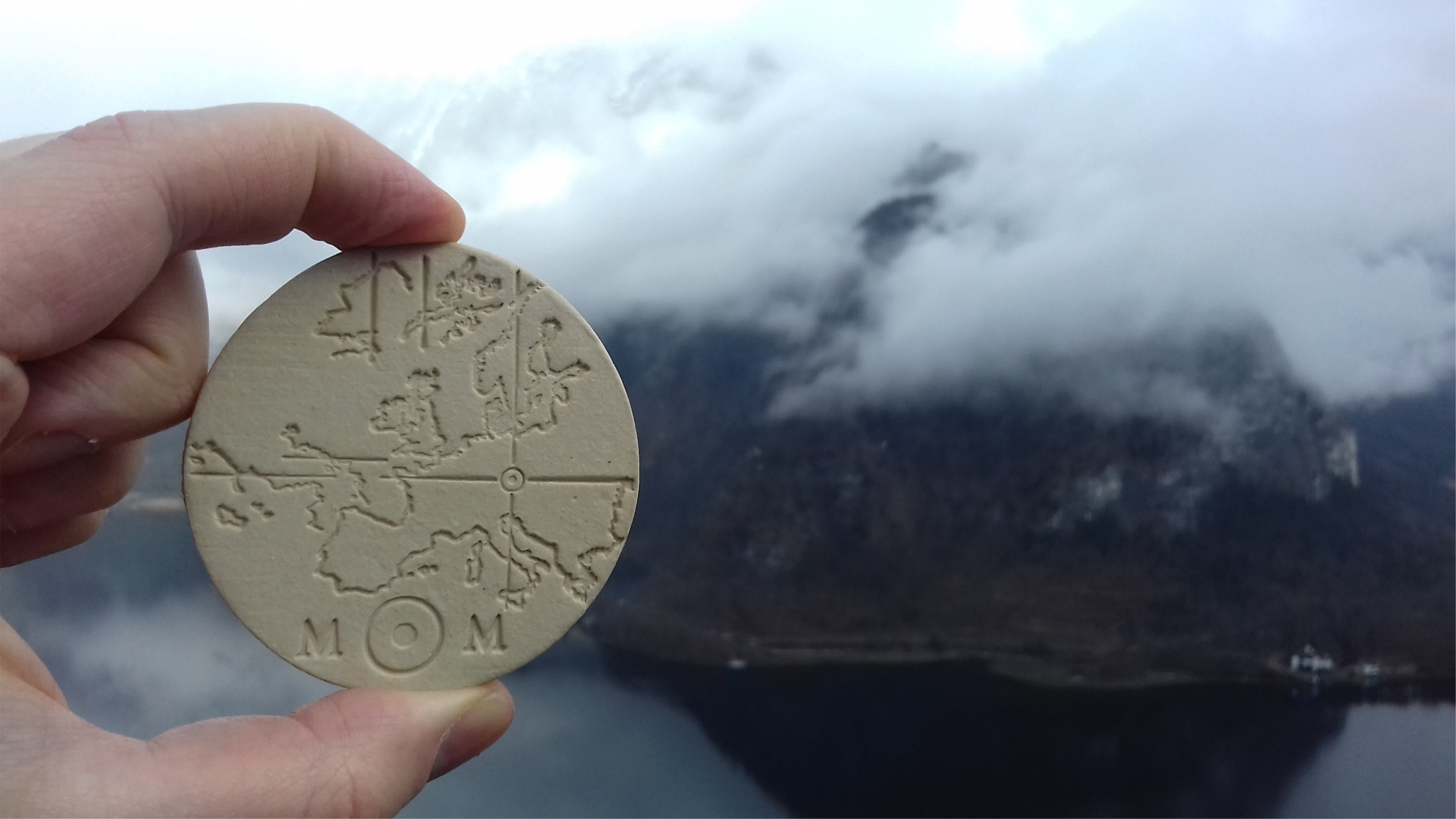
Token on Hallstatt

== See also ==
- Memory of the World Programme
- Arctic World Archive
- Svalbard Global Seed Vault
- List of time capsules
- Long Now Foundation
