= Statue of Daniel Webster (Boston) =

Statue in Boston, Massachusetts, U.S.

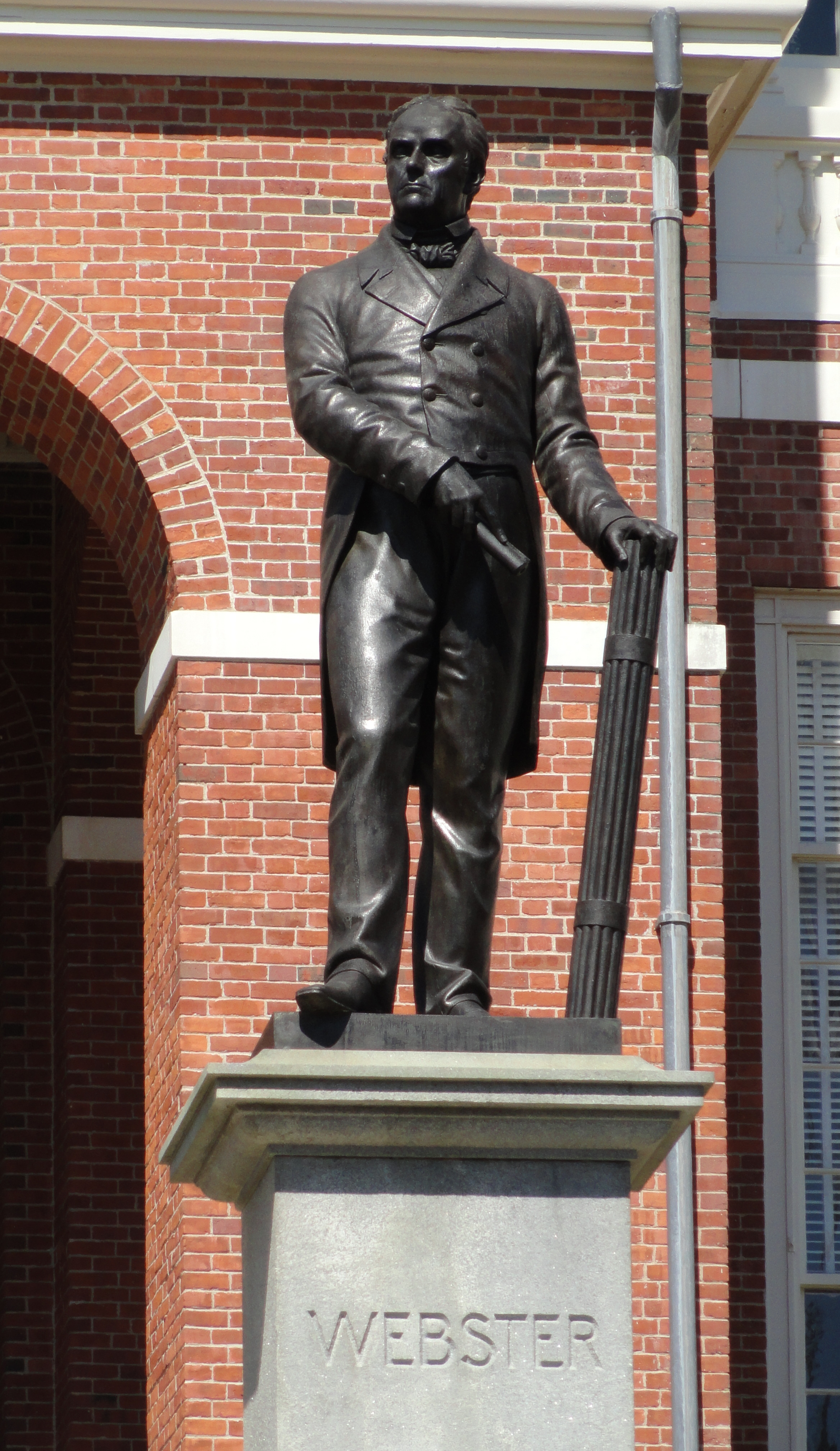
- The statue in 2011
- Artist: Hiram Powers
- Subject: Daniel Webster
- Location: 42°21′28.7″N 71°3′48.6″W

A statue of Daniel Webster (sometimes called Daniel Webster) by Hiram Powers is installed outside the Massachusetts State House, in Boston, Massachusetts, United States.

== Description and history ==
Funded by the Webster Memorial Committee, the 1858 bronze sculpture rests on a granite base, and was installed in 1859. The memorial was surveyed as part of the Smithsonian Institution's "Save Outdoor Sculpture!" program in 1994.

Following the September 11 attacks in 2001, police closed the gates to the State House lawn, cutting off public access to several of the statues, including Webster, Anne Hutchinson, John F. Kennedy, Henry Cabot Lodge and Horace Mann. These statues are still visible at a distance from the Beacon Street sidewalk, through a fence. Only the equestrian statue of Joseph Hooker and the statue of Mary Dyer remained open to close public inspection, as they are located in the pedestrian plaza of the building's main public entrance.

"I understand why the gates are shut, and I'm not going to question any security measures," criticized Susan Greendyke Lachevre, art collections manager for the Massachusetts Art Commission at the State House, in The Boston Globe in 2006. "But the monuments were made for the public. It is a shame that the public can't get any closer to them."

Public access to the Kennedy statue was restored in 2015, by allowing State House visitors, after clearing the security checkpoint, to exit the building at a nearby door staffed by security officers. This access is limited to weekdays during business hours in spring and summer. Visitors are still not allowed full access to the State House lawn and the other statues.
