= British War Library =

The British War Library service was a venture launched in 1914 to provide reading material to World War I British soldiers. It was one of the first examples of bibliotherapy in a military context, inspiring the American Library War Service to be founded a few years later - although earlier examples can be found, e.g. the Soldiers' Free Library.

The service was created by Helen Mary Gaskell, using Lady Battersea's large but empty London home Surrey House (near Marble Arch) as a base. It began operations in 1914.

Gaskell obtained official approval from Lord Haldane, then War Minister, and Sir Arthur Sloggett (head of the Royal Army Medical Corps). Initially it was aimed at the wounded in military hospitals, but the Admiralty requested it be extended to those on active service too, including medical staff and coastguards. Gaskell's younger brother (Beresford Melville, former MP for Stockport) offered financial support. An appeal was launched for donations of used books - the first appeal of the war - and with free promotion by newspapers, reading matter started arriving in parcels, boxes, then whole vanloads.

Demand was huge: it distributed over six million books and magazines, including new books (purchased by the public) and special editions printed by publishers specifically for this purpose (e.g. Oxford University Press supplied four and a half million New Testaments). At the same time, some people regarded it as a chance to clean out their rubbish while gaining credit for 'charity', so tens of thousands of old parish magazines were sent in, only to be thrown away.

In October 1915 it became known for a while as the "Red Cross and Order of St John War Library", when these two organizations took over the financial burden.

Surrey House also hosted the RAF Comforts Fund, which occupied the upper floors as a collection and distribution centre. It was destroyed in the late 1920s and replaced by the Regal (later Odeon) cinema.

When Thomas Jones CH and others set up the Army Bureau of Current Affairs in 1940 to provide 'mental stimulant' to World War II troops, this was partly continuing the BWL's aims, although Gaskell's contribution appears to have been largely overlooked until as late as the 21st century.
