= Time capsule =

Historic objects of goods or information

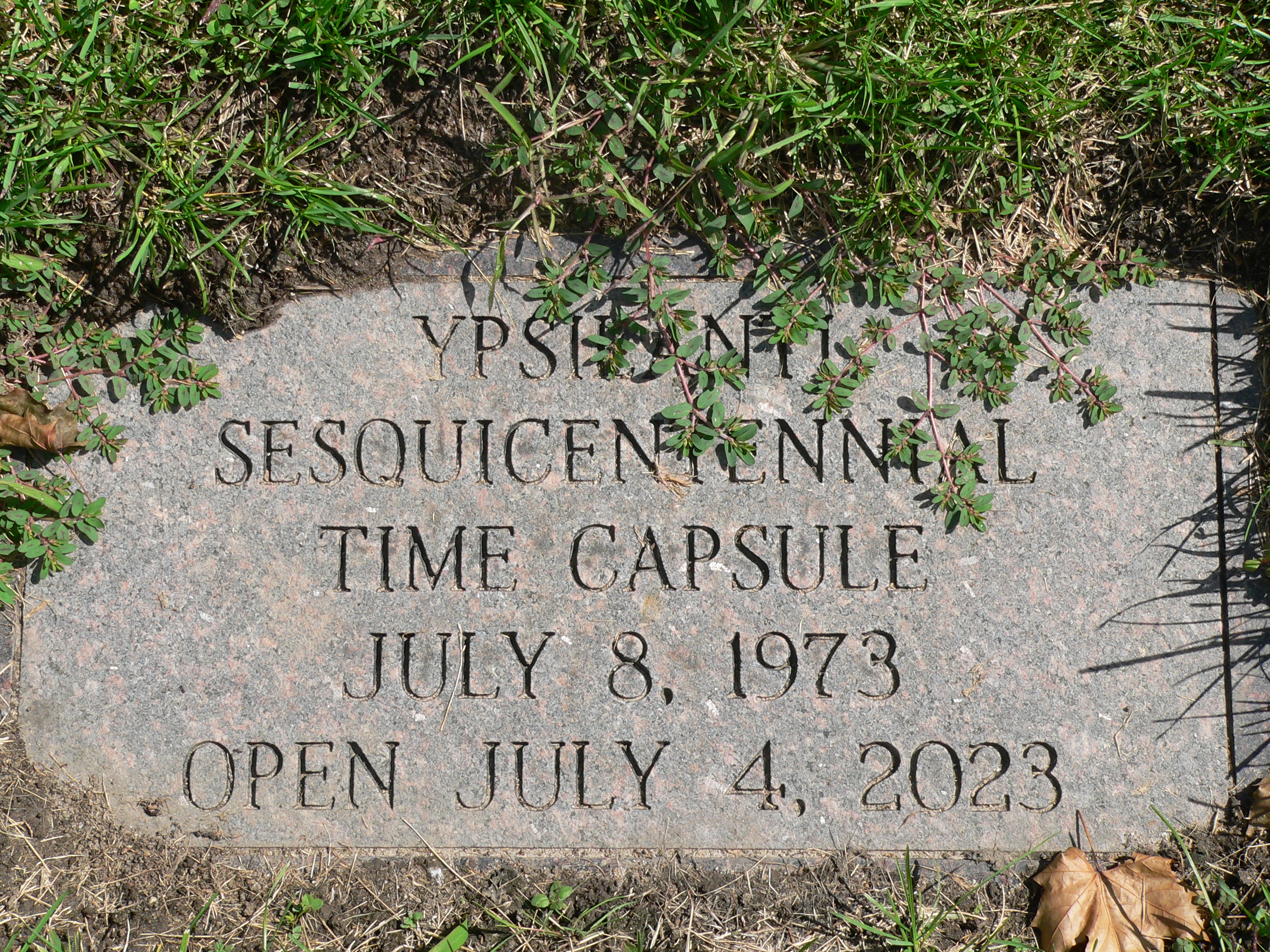
Time capsule plaque in Ypsilanti, Michigan, with instructions for the capsule to be recovered and opened upon the city's bicentennial, on July 4, 2023

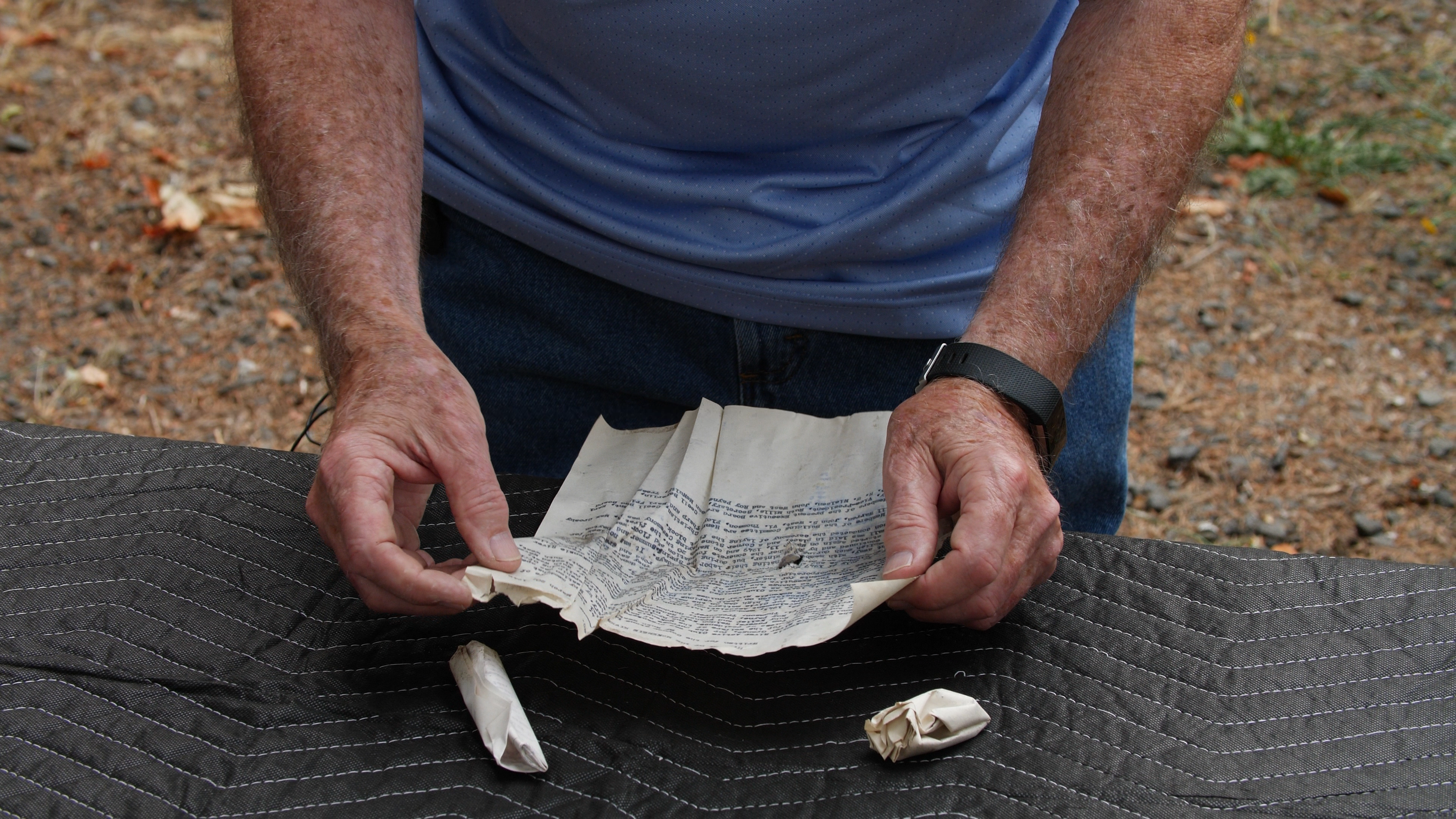
Typewritten documents recovered in 2021 from a capsule buried in the 1940s

A time capsule is a historic cache of goods or information, usually intended as a deliberate method of communication with future people, and to help future archaeologists, anthropologists, or historians. The preservation of holy relics dates back for millennia, but the practice of preparing and preserving a collection of everyday artifacts and messages to the future appears to be a more recent practice. Time capsules are sometimes created and buried during celebrations such as world's fairs or cornerstone layings for buildings or at other ceremonies.

== History ==
=== Early examples ===
It is widely debated when time capsules were first used, but the concept is fairly simple, and the idea and first use of time capsules could be much older than is currently documented. The term "time capsule" appears to be a relatively recent coinage dating from 1938. In Poland a time capsule dating to 1726 has been found. Around 1761, some dated artifacts were placed inside the hollow copper grasshopper weathervane, itself dating from 1742, atop historic Faneuil Hall in Boston. A time capsule dating to 1777 was discovered within a religious statue in Sotillo de la Ribera. A time capsule was discovered on November 30, 2017, in Burgos, Spain. A wooden statue of Jesus had hidden inside it a document with economic, political and cultural information, written by Joaquín Mínguez, chaplain of the Cathedral of Burgo de Osma in 1777. A time capsule from the era of the American Revolution, dating to 1795 and credited to Samuel Adams and Paul Revere, was temporarily removed in 2014 from the cornerstone of the Massachusetts State House in Boston. It had been previously opened in 1855, and some new items had been added before it was reinstalled. It was ceremonially reopened in January 2015 at the Museum of Fine Arts Boston, with specific restrictions on media coverage, to preserve the fragile artifacts. The contents were displayed there briefly, and then reinstalled in their original location. It is the oldest known time capsule in the United States.

=== 20th century ===
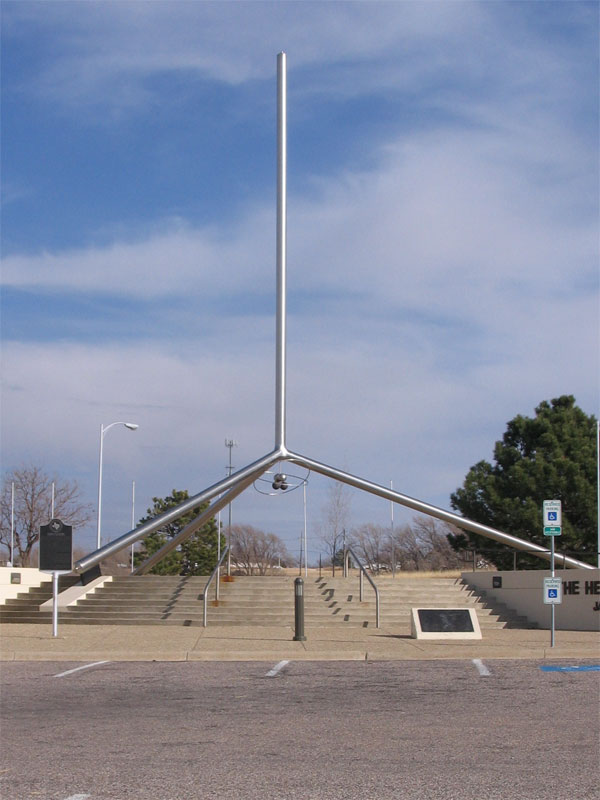
The Helium Centennial Time Columns Monument located in Amarillo, Texas, holds four time capsules in stainless steel intended to be opened after durations of 25, 50, 100, and 1,000 years after they were locked in 1968.

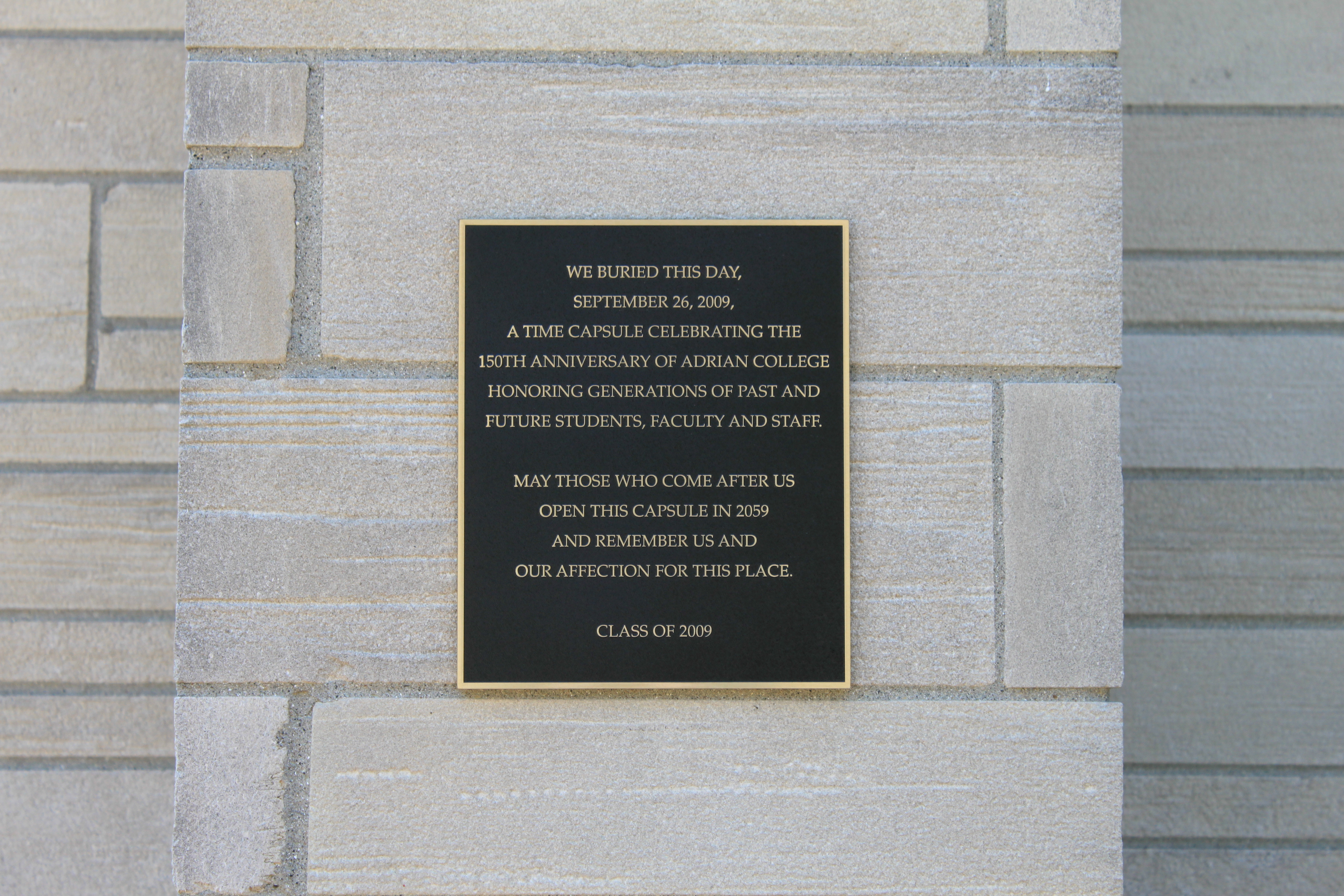
Herrick Tower time capsule, Adrian College, Michigan, 2009–2059

In 1901, a time capsule was placed inside the head of the copper lion ornamenting the Old State House in Boston. It was opened in 2014, during repairs to the sculpture and building, with plans to add new artifacts and reinstall it in its original location.

The Detroit Century Box, a brainchild of Detroit mayor William C. Maybury, was created on December 31, 1900, and scheduled to be opened 100 years later. It was filled with photographs and letters from 56 prominent residents describing life in 1900 and making predictions for the future, and included a letter by Maybury to the mayor of Detroit in 2000. The capsule was opened by city officials on December 31, 2000, in a ceremony presided over by Mayor Dennis Archer.

A time capsule labelled "Kan aabnes i 2012" ("Can open in 2012" in Norwegian) was sealed in 1912 in Otta, Norway. The capsule was opened as part of a ceremony 100 years later in 2012. Despite the large excitement over the capsule's opening and a preceding ceremony, its contents (which included notebooks, newspaper clippings, and community council papers) were met with disappointment.

The Crypt of Civilization (1940) at Oglethorpe University, intended to be opened in 8113, is claimed to be the first "modern" time capsule, although it was not called one at the time. During the socialist period in the USSR, many time capsules were buried with messages to a future communist society.

The 1939 New York World's Fair time capsule was created by Westinghouse as part of their exhibit. It was 90 inches (2.3 metres) long, with an interior diameter of 6.5 inches (17 cm), and weighed 800 pounds (360 kg). Westinghouse named the copper, chromium, and silver alloy "cupaloy", claiming it had the same strength as mild steel. It contained everyday items such as a spool of thread and a doll, a book of record (description of the capsule and its creators), a vial of staple food crop seeds, a microscope, and a 15-minute RKO Pathé Pictures newsreel. Microfilm spools condensed the contents of a Sears Roebuck catalog, dictionary, almanac, and other texts.

The 1939 time capsule was followed in 1965 by a second capsule at the same site, but 10 feet (3.0 m) to the north of the original. Both capsules are buried 50 feet (15 m) below Flushing Meadows Park, site of the Fair. Both the 1939 and 1965 Westinghouse Time Capsules are meant to be opened in 6939.

There is documentation of at least three physical time capsules at the Massachusetts Institute of Technology (MIT) in Cambridge, Massachusetts, as well as a "virtual" or digital time capsule.

As of 2019, four time capsules are "buried" in space. The two Pioneer Plaques and the two Voyager Golden Records have been attached to spacecraft for the possible benefit of spacefarers in the distant future. A fifth time capsule, the KEO satellite, was scheduled to be launched in 2015–16 carrying individual messages from Earth's inhabitants addressed to those of the year 52,000, when it was due to return to Earth. However, it was delayed several times and the project eventually closed in 2025 without ever being launched.

The International Time Capsule Society was created in 1990 to maintain a global database of all known time capsules. The Not Forgotten Digital Preservation Library maintains a current map and register of domestic and commercial time capsules.

=== 21st century ===
In 2005, Forbes magazine administered an email time capsule project in which people composed emails to themselves, and Forbes promised to send them back in one, three, five, ten or twenty years.

"Earth's Black Box"—a city bus-sized structure with steel walls, battery storage and solar panels located at a remote site in Tasmania, Australia—will accumulate and electronically store comprehensive climate research and related data, including land and sea temperature changes, ocean acidification, atmospheric greenhouse gas concentrations, human population, energy consumption, military spending, and policy changes. The box was conceived to tell future civilizations how humankind created the climate crisis, and how it failed or succeeded in addressing it.

On February 22, 2024, the Arch Mission Foundation landed the Lunar Library on the Moon, containing the English Wikipedia and other content, with the GLL Lunaprise mission, on the Intuitive Machines IM-1 mission.

== Criticism ==
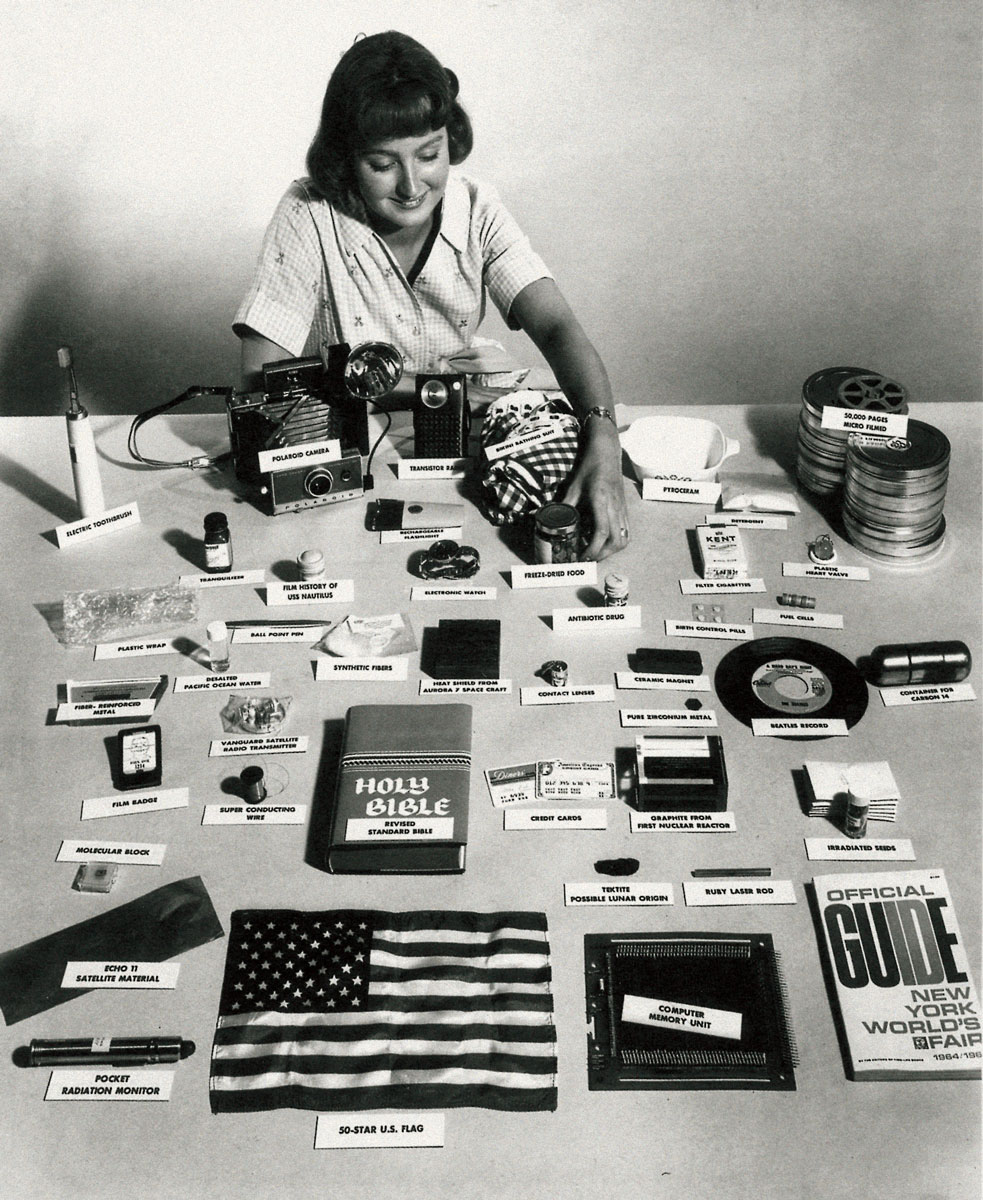
Miscellaneous objects prepared for the Westinghouse Time Capsule, created for the 1964–1965 New York World's Fair, intended to be opened in 5000 years

According to time capsule historian William Jarvis, most intentional time capsules usually do not provide much useful historical information: they are typically filled with "useless junk", new and pristine in condition, that tells little about the people of the time. Many time capsules today contain only artifacts of limited value to future historians. Historians suggest that items which describe the daily lives of the people who created them, such as personal notes, pictures, videos and documents, would greatly increase the value of the time capsule to future historians.

If time capsules have a museum-like goal of preserving the culture of a particular time and place for study, they fulfill this goal very poorly in that they, by definition, are kept sealed for a particular length of time. Subsequent generations between the launch date and the target date will have no direct access to the artifacts and therefore these generations are prevented from learning from the contents directly. Therefore, time capsules can be seen, in respect to their usefulness to historians, as dormant museums, their releases timed for some date so far in the future that the building in question is no longer intact.

Historians also concede that there are many preservation issues surrounding the selection of the media to transmit this information to the future. Some of these issues include the obsolescence of technology and the deterioration of electronic and magnetic storage media (known as the digital dark age), and possible language problems if the capsule is dug up in the distant future. Many buried time capsules are lost, as interest in them fades and the exact location is forgotten, or they are destroyed within a few years by groundwater.

== Cultural references ==
The 1947 docudrama The Beginning or the End is a semi-historical account of the creation of the first atomic bomb during World War II. The film begins with staged newsreel footage of the scientists and officers involved in the project (played by actors) burying a time capsule in Redwood National Forest in California. The capsule contained a copy of the film, along with a projector to view it on, and instructions for its operation set on a metal sheet. The purpose of the capsule was in line with the film's title, about whether humanity will destroy itself now that it has the ability to, or whether it will rise above war as a whole and come together to use nuclear power for greater purposes. The film can be seen as an example of Cold War propaganda.

The 2009 dramatic film Knowing involves a time capsule being placed in the ground by an elementary school in 1959.

Artists such as Andy Warhol, Christian Boltanski, and Louise Bourgeois are known for compiling collections of everyday artifacts that they associate with memories of the past, which are preserved in museums and archives.

The 1955 Warner Bros. cartoon One Froggy Evening involves a singing and dancing frog extricated from (and eventually replaced within) a time capsule. Filmmaker Steven Spielberg, in the PBS Chuck Jones biographical documentary Extremes & Inbetweens: A Life in Animation, called One Froggy Evening "the Citizen Kane of animated shorts". In 1994, it was voted No. 5 of the 50 Greatest Cartoons of all time by members of the animation profession.

== Personal and domestic time capsules ==
Commercially manufactured sealable containers are sold for the protection of personal time capsules; some of the more durable waterproof containers used for geocaching may also be suitable. Many underground time capsules are destroyed by groundwater infiltration after short periods of time; caches stored within the wall cavities of buildings can survive as long as the building is used and maintained.

In 2016, the art collective Ant Farm displayed a show, The Present Is the Form of All Life: The Time Capsules of Ant Farm and LST, at the art center Pioneer Works, in Brooklyn, New York. The artists had previous experiences with failed time capsules, and were now exploring "digital time capsules" as a more durable form of preservation. They have said, "We’ve come to understand that the best way to preserve digital media is to distribute it." Blockchain and cognitive learning is now used in time capsule technology. Researchers have started to study methods of preserving digital data in forms that will still be usable in the distant future.

== See also ==
- Archive – Accumulation of historical records
- Bracewell probe – Hypothetical space probe
- Builders' rites – Ceremonies associated with construction
- Clock of the Long Now – Clock designed to keep time for 10,000 years
- List of time capsules
- Message in a bottle – Form of communication
- Rosetta Project – Language preservation project
- Web archiving – Preserving history of web pages
- White House Millennium Council – Council as part of the 2000 celebrations
