= Statue of John F. Kennedy (Boston) =

Statue in Boston, Massachusetts, U.S.

John F. Kennedy
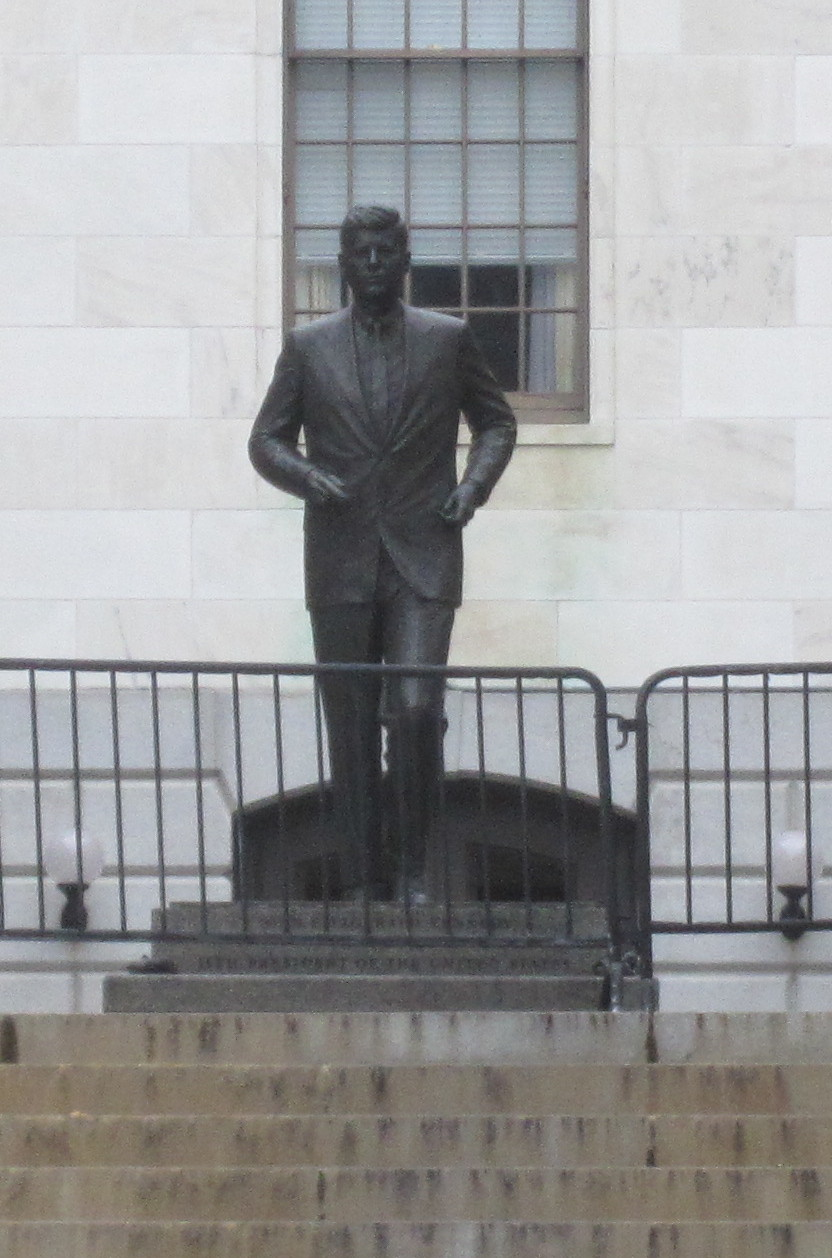
- The statue in 2019
- Artist: Isabel McIlvain
- Medium: Bronze sculpture
- Subject: John F. Kennedy
- Location: Boston, Massachusetts, U.S.; 42.357979°N 71.064124°W

A side view of the statue

A statue of John F. Kennedy (sometimes called John F. Kennedy) by Isabel McIlvain is installed outside the Massachusetts State House in Boston, Massachusetts, United States.

== Description ==
The bronze sculpture with green patina measures approximately 8 ft. 2 in. × 3 ft. × 18 in. (249 × 91 × 46 cm), and rests on a granite base that measures approximately 27 × 72 × 87.5 in. (69 × 183 × 222 cm). It cost $180,000, and weighs 600 lbs. (272 kg).

== History ==
The memorial was designed in 1988 and dedicated on May 29, 1990, the date that would have been Kennedy's 73rd birthday. The ceremony attracted a crowd of 2,500 that included Kennedy's widow Jacqueline Kennedy Onassis, his brother Ted Kennedy and other family members.

The statue, which depicts Kennedy in midstride, quickly became a tourist attraction on the State House grounds. It was surveyed by the Smithsonian Institution's "Save Outdoor Sculpture!" program in 1994.

Following the September 11 attacks in 2001, however, police closed the gates to the State House lawn, cutting off public access to several statues, including Kennedy, Anne Hutchinson, Henry Cabot Lodge, Horace Mann and Daniel Webster. These statues were still visible at a distance from the Beacon Street sidewalk, through a fence. Only the equestrian statue of Joseph Hooker and the statue of Mary Dyer remained open to close public inspection, as they are located in the pedestrian plaza of the building's main public entrance.

For two days in 2013, on the 50th anniversary of Kennedy's assassination, state officials allowed visitors to get close to the statue, with a park ranger present. Starting in 2015, they made access to the statue a regular feature during business hours, on weekdays, in spring and summer.

There is still no direct access from the street; visitors must first enter the State House and go through security screening, then exit the building from a door near the statue where security officers are stationed.

Public access to the statue was again cut off in March 2020, when visitors were barred from the State House amid the COVID-19 pandemic. In October 2020, officials announced plans to move the JFK statue closer to Beacon Street, so that it can easily be seen from the public sidewalk, which forms a portion of the Freedom Trail.

== See also ==
- Cultural depictions of John F. Kennedy
- List of memorials to John F. Kennedy
- List of sculptures of presidents of the United States
