= Statue of Anne Hutchinson =

Statue in Boston, Massachusetts, U.S.

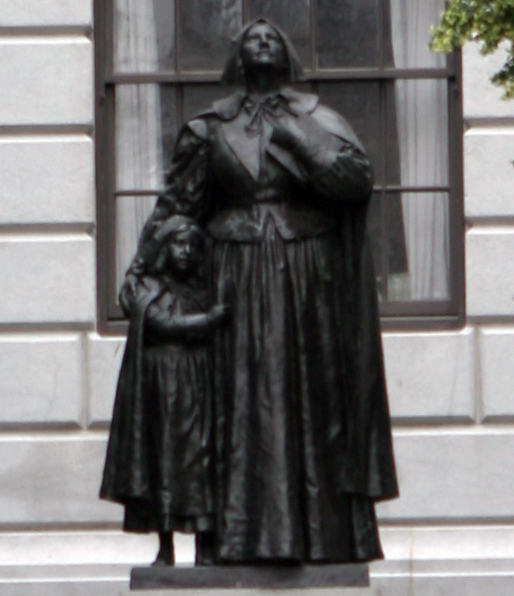
- The statue in 2005
- Artist: Cyrus Edwin Dallin
- Subject: Anne Hutchinson
- Location: Boston, Massachusetts, U.S.; 42°21′28.2″N 71°3′51.7″W

A statue of Anne Hutchinson by Cyrus Edwin Dallin (sometimes called Anne Marbury Hutchinson) is installed outside the Massachusetts State House, in Boston, Massachusetts, United States.

== Description and history ==
The bronze sculpture depicts Hutchinson and a young girl at her side. It was cast 1915 and installed 1922. The statue measures approximately 98 x 52 x 30 in., and rests on a granite base measuring approximately 78 x 66 x 48 in. It was surveyed as part of the Smithsonian Institution's "Save Outdoor Sculpture!" program in 1996.

Anne Hutchinson was a controversial figure in Massachusetts history, and the statue itself became the object of heated controversy in 1922. "Unable to decide whether the bronze sculpture by Cyrus E. Dallin was 'an appropriate addition to the State House,' the legislators argued for weeks while the art work lay on the State House porch."

Dallin's neighbor, Edward Verne Powell (accomplished professional jazz and big band flute player, and son of Boston flute maker Verne Q. Powell), modeled for the arm of the child. "We both lived on Oakland Avenue in Arlington then. I was 11 years old, I guess, and I loved to stop in and watch him work. He asked me to model so he could get a realistic representation of the child's arm." The renowned sculptor Anne Whitney posed for Hutchinson. Dallin reproduced the sculpture in the Signing of the Mayflower Compact bas relief in Provincetown, Massachusetts.

Following the September 11 attacks in 2001, police closed the gates to the State House lawn, cutting off public access to several of the statues, including Hutchinson, John F. Kennedy, Henry Cabot Lodge, Horace Mann and Daniel Webster. These statues are still visible at a distance from the Beacon Street sidewalk, through a fence. Only the equestrian statue of Joseph Hooker and the statue of Mary Dyer remained open to close public inspection, as they are located in the pedestrian plaza of the building's main public entrance.

"I understand why the gates are shut, and I'm not going to question any security measures," criticized Susan Greendyke Lachevre, art collections manager for the Massachusetts Art Commission at the State House, in The Boston Globe in 2006. "But the monuments were made for the public. It is a shame that the public can't get any closer to them."

Public access to the Kennedy statue was restored in 2015, by allowing State House visitors, after clearing the security checkpoint, to exit the building at a nearby door staffed by security officers. This access is limited to weekdays during business hours in spring and summer. Visitors are still not allowed full access to the State House lawn and the other statues.

== See also ==
- List of sculptures by Cyrus Dallin in Massachusetts
