= Elida Rumsey =

American nurse (1842–1919)

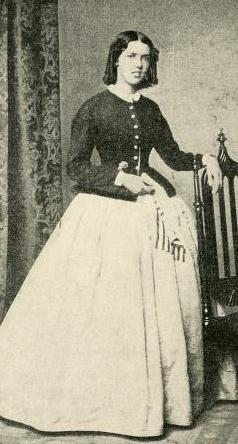
- Elida Rumsey in 1862, from an 1897 publication
- Born: June 26, 1842; New York City, US
- Died: June 17, 1919 (aged 76); Boston, Massachusetts, US
- Known for: Civil War nursing

Elida B. Rumsey (June 6, 1842 – June 17, 1919), also referred to by her married name, Elida Fowle, was a singer, philanthropist, and Union nurse during the American Civil War. Too young to join Dorothea Dix's army nursing service, Rumsey volunteered for three years of the war.

== Early life ==
Elida Barker Rumsey was born in New York City on June 6, 1842, the daughter of John Wickliffe Rumsey and Mary Agnes Underhill Rumsey. Her father owned a hosiery shop, and later worked in banking. As a child, Rumsey's parents moved to Washington, D.C. which began Rumsey's interest in political action. At the time of southern secession, Rumsey was engaged to John A. Fowle who was employed in the Navy. Because of their closeness to the capital and Fowle's work, the couple was interested in serving in the Civil War, particularly in a philanthropic manner.

== Civil War Service ==
In November 1861, Rumsey began her hospital service. She worked for the Union Army specifically, but was known to help and serve any injured soldier regardless of their loyalties.

In addition to nursing, Rumsey used her singing voice towards the war effort. She sang to a crowd of soldiers at a prisoner exchange, in an effort to lift their spirits, as well as at Sunday evening prayer groups to help raise money for the Soldiers' Free Library. Rumsey would often stand on the rebel flag while singing The Star-Spangled Banner in an effort to rouse the audience. Among her other performances, she was said to be the first person to sing "Battle Hymn of the Republic" in a public venue, in Washington, D.C.

Rumsey served in numerous hospitals in the D.C. area for a total of three years. She made crutches and canes for wounded soldiers which were stored in the Soldiers' Free Library along with other donations, which she helped to organize and fund. She also took supplies and over four hundred loaves of bread to the Second Battle of Bull Run. En route to the battle, she and her husband came across a small cabin which they turned into a makeshift hospital. Rumsey carried water for the patients from over two miles away. She left the war with her own scars from blood poisoning.

== Personal life ==
Elida Rumsey married John Allen Fowle in 1863, on the floor of the U.S. House of Representatives, the same day the Soldiers' Free Library building was dedicated in Washington, D.C. The couple moved to Brooklyn after the war, where they were active in the Congregational church led by Henry Ward Beecher. They moved to Dorchester, Massachusetts in 1877. They raised four children together, including a war orphan, Jeannie, whom they adopted; a fifth child died young. They marked their fiftieth wedding anniversary in 1913, with a reception at the Massachusetts State House.

In her later years, Elida Rumsey Fowle was active in veterans' organizations in New England, and founded the Grandchildren of Veterans of the Civil War. She started another free library, volunteered at a hospital, and worked in various charity homes for aged women, intemperate women, working women, aged couples. She was widowed when John A. Fowle died in 1916, and she died in 1919, aged 77 years, in Dorchester.

== In popular culture ==
In 1913, Rumsey's story was fictionalized for a silent film, Song Bird of the North. The Rumsey character was played by Anita Stewart.
