= Equestrian statue of Joseph Hooker =

Equestrian statue in Boston, Massachusetts, U.S.

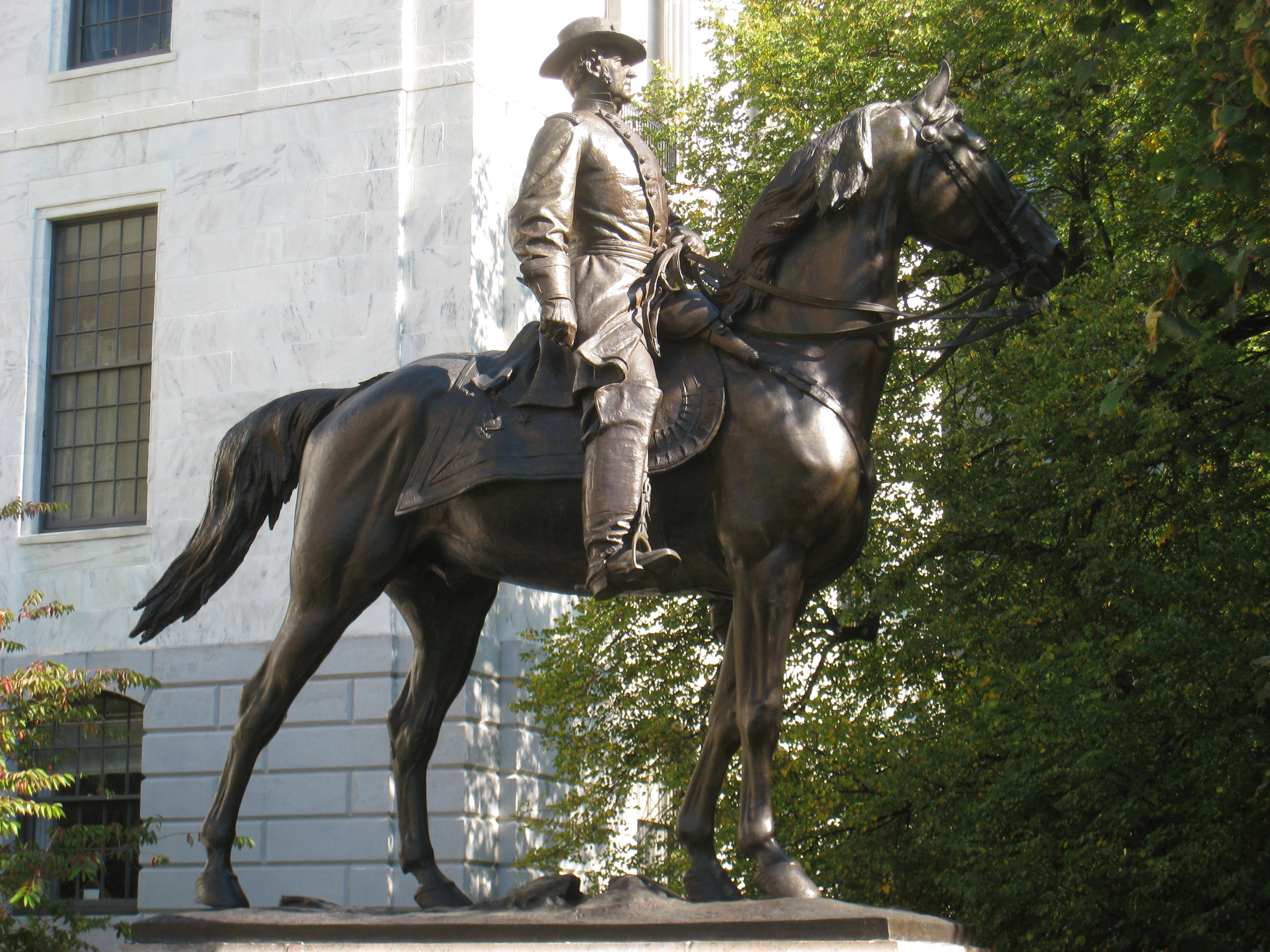
- The statue in 2008
- Year: 1903; 123 years ago
- Medium: Bronze sculpture
- Subject: Joseph Hooker
- Location: Boston, Massachusetts, U.S.; 42°21′28.8″N 71°3′47.3″W

An equestrian statue of Joseph Hooker (sometimes called General Joseph Hooker) is installed outside the Massachusetts State House, facing Beacon Street in Boston, in the United States.

Hooker, a native of Hadley, Massachusetts, was a United States Army officer in the Mexican–American War and a major general in the United States Civil War. His statue stands about 15 ft (4.6 m) high and was unveiled in June 1903 to an artillery salute, during a ceremony attended by military and civilian officials.

== History ==
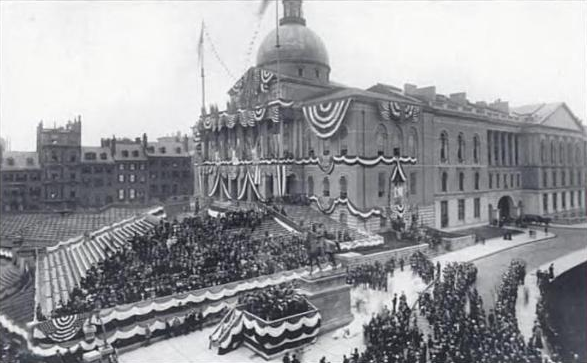
Dedication ceremony for the statue in June 1903

The 1903 bronze sculpture was designed by Daniel Chester French and Edward Clark Potter, and rests on a granite base. It was surveyed as part of the Smithsonian Institution's "Save Outdoor Sculpture!" program in 1997.

Legislators approved US$55,000 in public funds to commission the statue. The statue originally included a bronze plaque bearing the words "A Soldier in the Army that Kept the Nation Whole". Veterans' groups demanded the removal of this inscription, as they felt it diminished Hooker's leadership role in the war.

Though popular with his troops, Hooker's memorialization in one of the most prominent locations in Massachusetts has been controversial. The historian Charles Francis Adams Jr., who served as a colonel in the Civil War, was quoted as saying he refused to walk on the same side of the street as the statue: "I look upon [the statue] as an opprobrium cast on every genuine Massachusetts man who served in the Civil War. Hooker in no way and in no degree represents the typical soldiership of the Commonwealth."

In 2017, amid the removal of Confederate monuments and memorials in the Southern United States, the Boston Globe said the Joseph Hooker statue belongs to "the category known as Why Are These Statues Even Here At All?" The newspaper quoted Peter Drummey of the Massachusetts Historical Society as stating that "Hooker didn't have a very good reputation as a soldier or as a person." Drummey speculated that rather than honoring the person himself, the presence of the Joseph Hooker statue at the State House is a testament to the political power of veterans' groups.

The Hooker statue, along with the nearby statue of Mary Dyer, remained open to the public even after the September 11 attacks in 2001 prompted state authorities to close the gates to the State House lawn, limiting access to statues of Anne Hutchinson, John F. Kennedy, Henry Cabot Lodge, Horace Mann and Daniel Webster.

== General Hooker Entrance ==
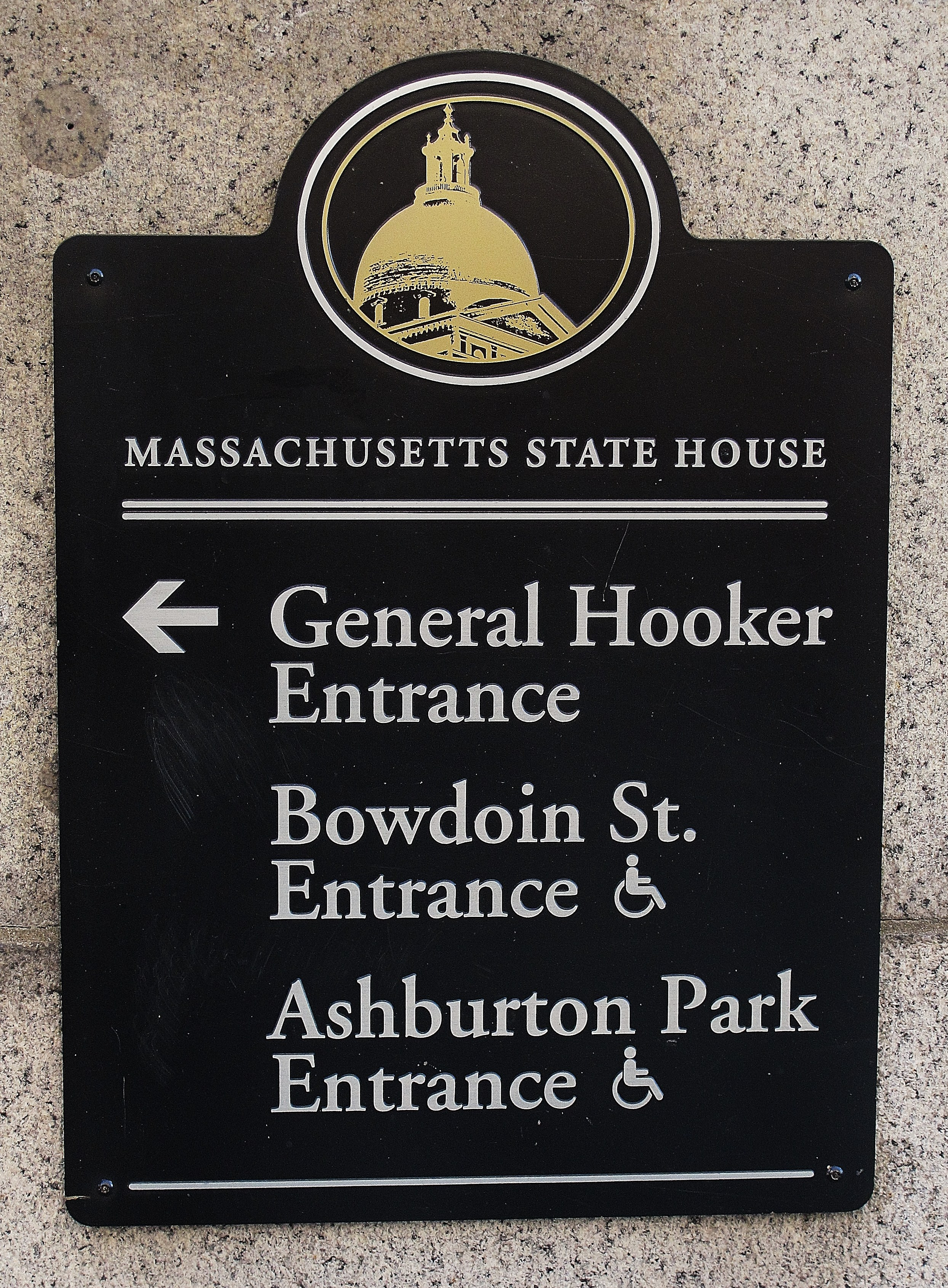
A sign outside the Massachusetts State House points to the three public entrances, one of which is named for General Hooker.

The statue stands in front of, and lends its name to, the main public entrance to the State House. The large sign reading "General Hooker Entrance" is often the source of double entendres, particularly from groups of schoolchildren on field trips. In 2011, for example, actor Kevin Bacon tweeted a photo of the entrance with the question, "Where do special hookers enter?" State Representative Michelle DuBois, a Democrat from Brockton, called for the name of the entrance to be changed in 2018, saying it is "tone deaf" and shows "disregard for the majority of women's feelings and dignity for the raising up and false-protection of a statue of a long-dead general". She said women who work in the State House face uncomfortable "good-old-boy, schoolyard jokes" because of the name. Governor Charlie Baker and other state officials rejected the notion of making changes to the sign.

== See also ==
- 1903 in art
- List of equestrian statues in the United States
- Public sculptures by Daniel Chester French
