= Helen Mary Gaskell =

Society hostess and philanthropist in London

Helen Mary Gaskell (née Melville), CBE, known as May Gaskell (1853–1940) was a society hostess and philanthropist in London who established the British War Library.

Gaskell was a "vivacious but unhappily married society hostess who belonged to the aristocratic circle of friends known as the 'Souls'": she had a platonic relationship with the artist Edward Burne-Jones, who wrote her up to six letters a day and painted a famous portrait of her daughter Amy. The letters were only discovered in 2005, when May's great-grandchild Josceline Dimbleby wrote a book about the affair, called "A Profound Secret". Burne-Jones also painted May herself.

Gaskell founded the War Library in 1914 and remained actively involved as its Honorary Secretary throughout the war.

Despite moving in similar circles, she was no relation to Elizabeth Gaskell.

== Awards and honours ==
- CBE, 1917.(The London Gazette)
