= Statue of Mary Dyer =

Statue in Boston, Massachusetts, U.S.

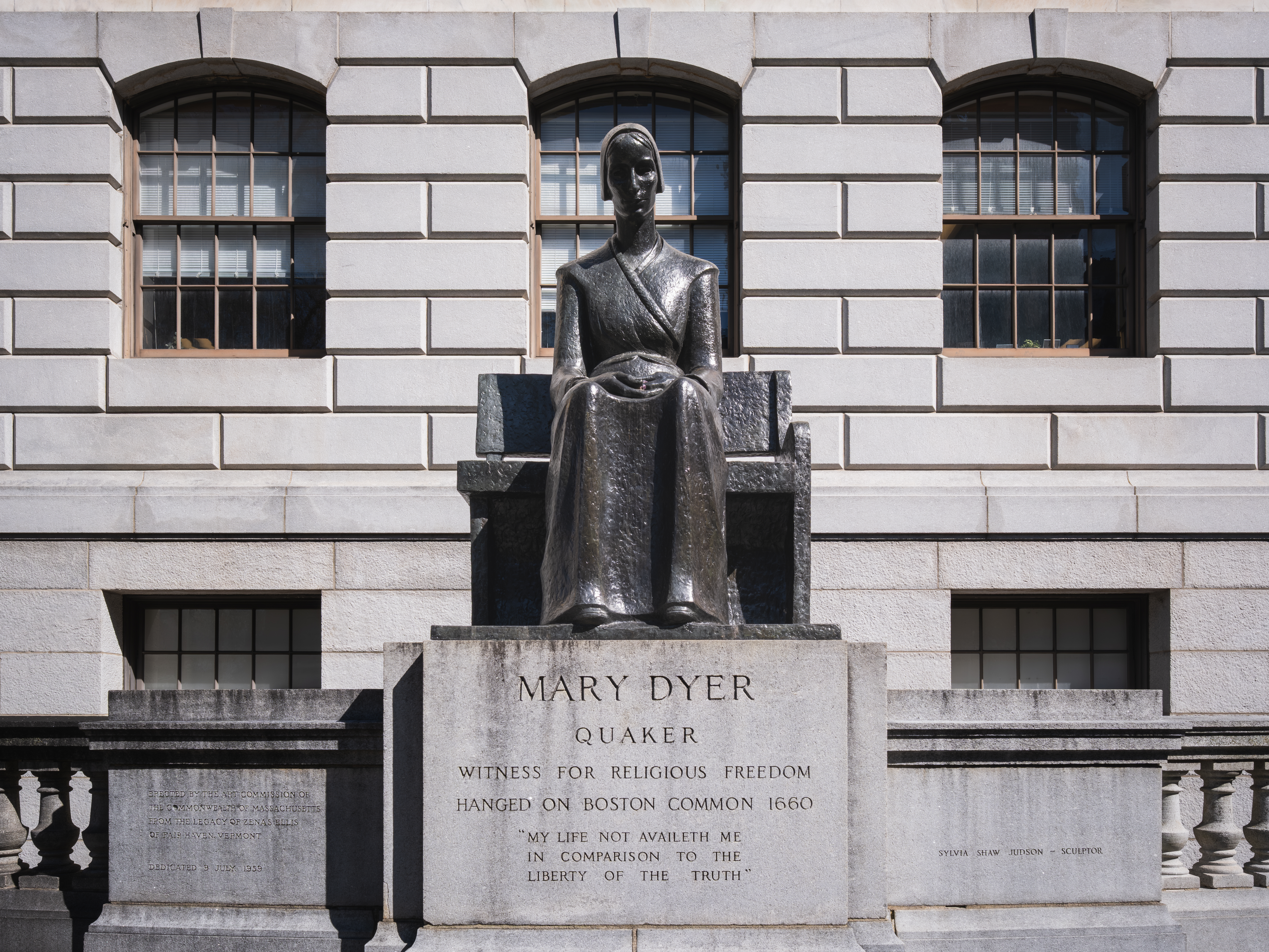
- The statue in 2026
- Artist: Sylvia Shaw Judson
- Year: 1959
- Medium: Bronze sculpture
- Subject: Mary Dyer
- Location: Boston, Massachusetts, U.S.; 42°21′29″N 71°3′46.4″W

A statue of Quaker religious martyr Mary Dyer by Sylvia Shaw Judson is installed outside the Massachusetts State House, in Boston, Massachusetts, United States.

== Description and history ==
The bronze sculpture was commissioned by the Commonwealth of Massachusetts and dedicated on July 9, 1959. It depicts Dyer sitting on a bench and wearing Quaker clothing. The artist used Anna Cox Brinton as the model for the face of the statue, which rests on a stone base. It was surveyed as part of the Smithsonian Institution's "Save Outdoor Sculpture!" program in 1993.

The Dyer statue, along with the nearby equestrian statue of Joseph Hooker, remained open to the public even after the September 11 attacks in 2001 prompted state authorities to close the gates to the State House lawn, limiting access to statues of Anne Hutchinson, John F. Kennedy, Henry Cabot Lodge, Horace Mann and Daniel Webster.

Identical castings stand before the Friends Center, 1501 Cherry Street, Philadelphia, and Stout Meetinghouse at Earlham College, Richmond, Indiana.

== See also ==
- 1959 in art
