= Statue of Henry Cabot Lodge =

Statue in Boston, Massachusetts, U.S.

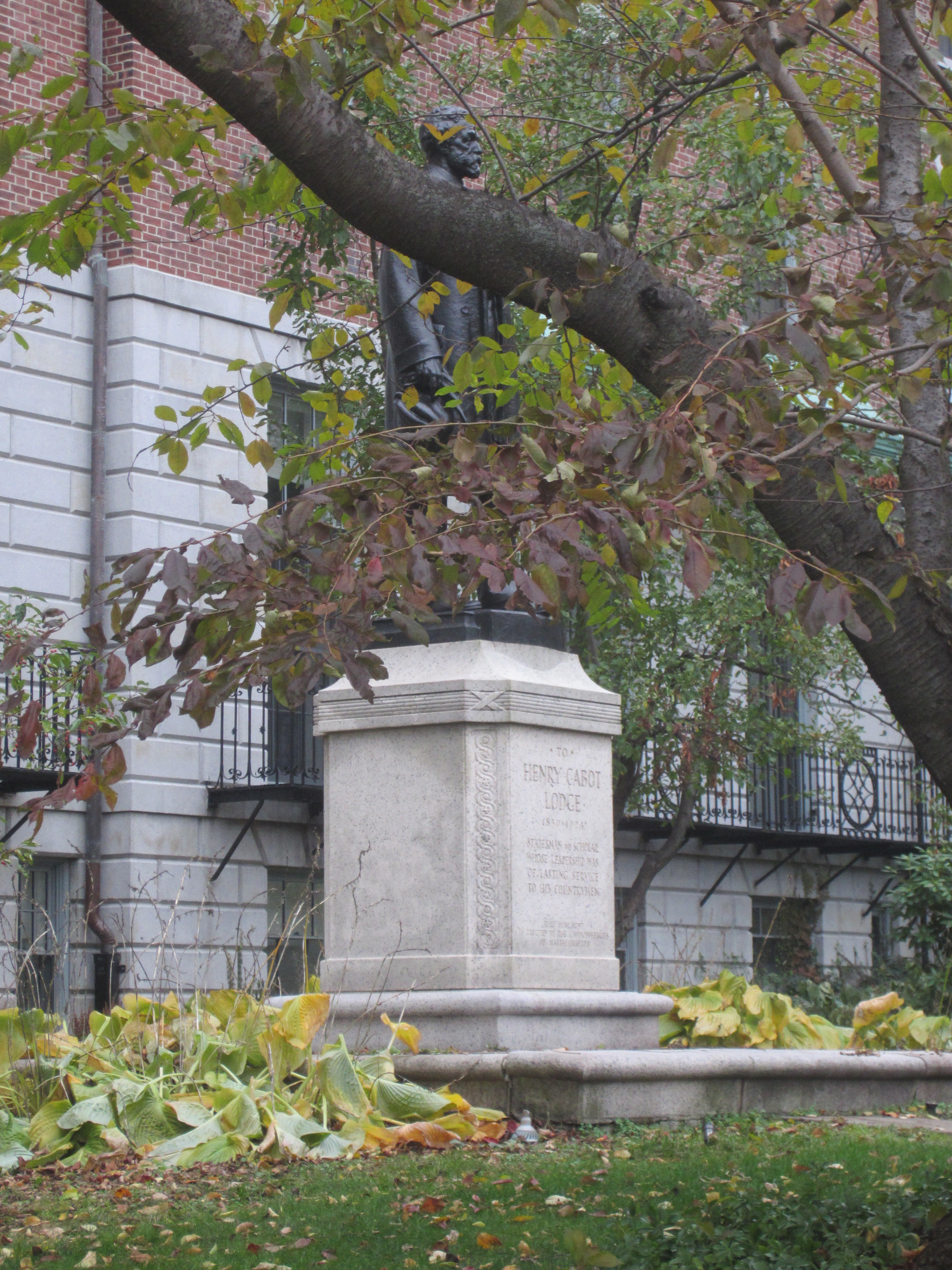
- Obstructed view of the statue in 2019
- Artist: Raymond Averill Porter
- Subject: Henry Cabot Lodge
- Location: Boston, Massachusetts, U.S.; 42°21′27.1″N 71°3′52.7″W

A statue of Henry Cabot Lodge by Raymond Averill Porter is installed outside the Massachusetts State House, in Boston, Massachusetts, United States.

== Description and history ==
The 1930 bronze sculpture was dedicated on October 26, 1932. The statue measures 96 x 30 x 28 1/2 in., and rests on a granite base that measures 73 x 56 x 53 1/2 in. The work was surveyed as part of the Smithsonian Institution's "Save Outdoor Sculpture!" program in 1997.

Following the September 11 attacks in 2001, police closed the gates to the State House lawn, cutting off public access to several of the statues, including Lodge, Anne Hutchinson, John F. Kennedy, Horace Mann and Daniel Webster. These statues are still visible at a distance from the Beacon Street sidewalk, through a fence. Only the equestrian statue of Joseph Hooker and the statue of Mary Dyer remained open to close public inspection, as they are located in the pedestrian plaza of the building's main public entrance.

"I understand why the gates are shut, and I'm not going to question any security measures," said Susan Greendyke Lachevre, art collections manager for the Massachusetts Art Commission at the State House, in The Boston Globe in 2006. "But the monuments were made for the public. It is a shame that the public can't get any closer to them."

Public access to the Kennedy statue was restored in 2015, by allowing State House visitors, after clearing the security checkpoint, to exit the building at a nearby door staffed by security officers. This access is limited to weekdays during business hours in spring and summer. Visitors are still not allowed full access to the State House lawn and the other statues.
