= Samuel Adams and Paul Revere time capsule =

American time capsule from 1795

Coordinates: 42.35923°N 71.06430°W

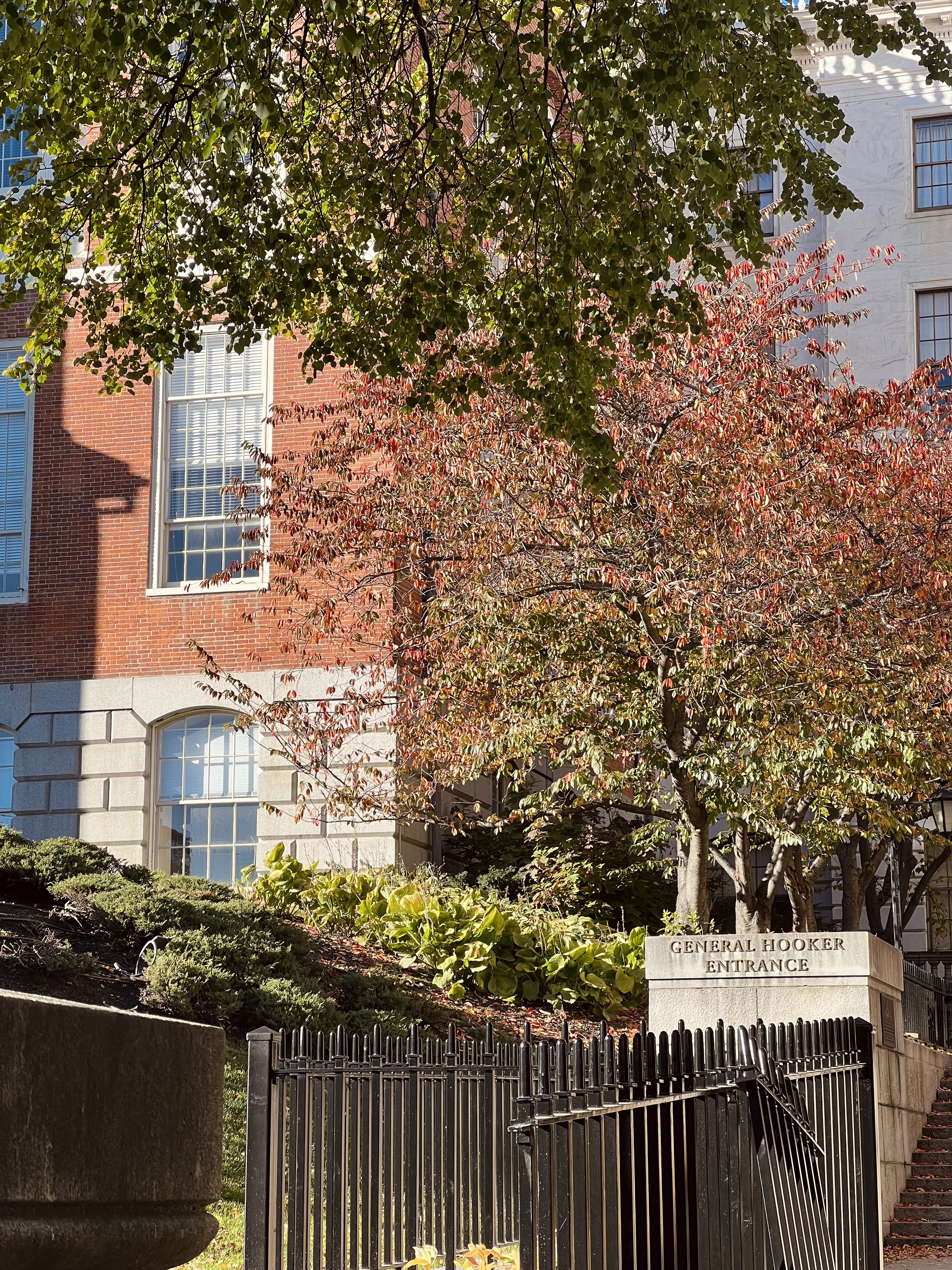
- Cornerstones of the Massachusetts State House containing the time capsule, 2022

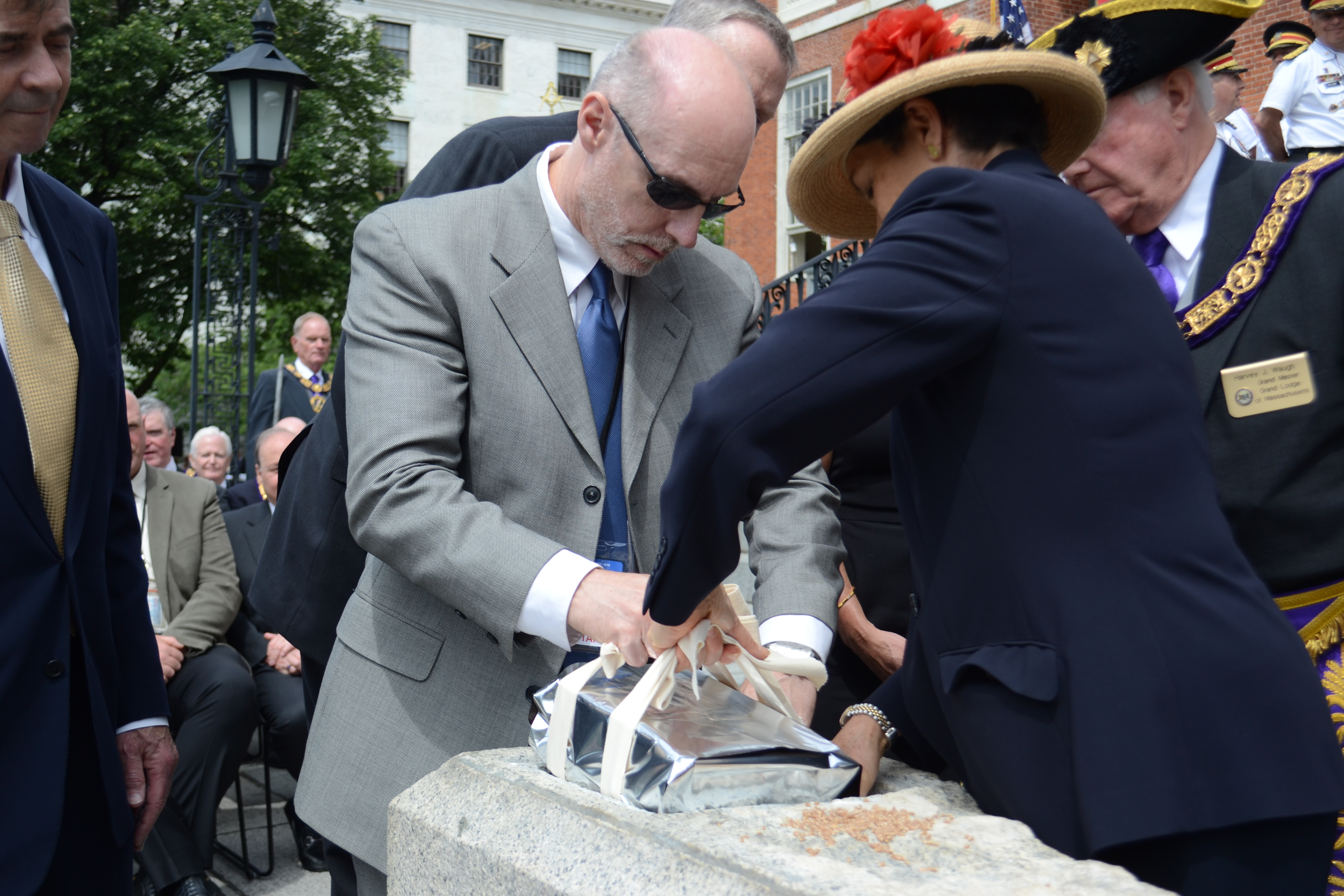
The time capsule was resealed into the cornerstone of the Massachusetts State House, 2015.

The Samuel Adams and Paul Revere Time Capsule, also known as The Massachusetts State House Time Capsule, is a time capsule located in a cornerstone of the Massachusetts State House. It is widely believed to have been buried in 1795 by then-Governor Samuel Adams and Paul Revere. It is the oldest known time capsule in the United States.

The time capsule is a metal container measuring 5.5 by 7.5 by 1.5 inches (140 mm × 191 mm × 38 mm), and weighing about 10 pounds (4.5 kg). It was first removed from its location in 1855, at which time its contents were cleaned and documented. Additional items were added to it at that time, and it was resealed in place. The capsule was again removed from its location in December 2014. X-ray examination by conservation specialists at the Museum of Fine Arts, Boston revealed the presence of coins and other items. It was opened by specialists in a media event in the American gallery of the museum on January 6, 2015. Its contents include newspaper pages of the period and coins including a 1652 pine tree shilling. There was also a silver plate, probably engraved by Revere, and a copper medal depicting George Washington. The objects were placed on display for a time. The capsule was resealed into the cornerstone in a traditional ceremony on June 17, 2015 by Boston officials. A mint set of 2015 United States coins was added, including dollar coins of presidents Lyndon B. Johnson, John F. Kennedy, Dwight D. Eisenhower and Harry S. Truman. A silver plaque commemorating the event was also included.
