= Soldiers' Free Library =

Coordinates: 38.8950°N 77.01912°W

The Soldiers' Free Library was established in Washington, D.C. during the American Civil War, to supply Union troops with reading material. The library also held other items for the troops' use, including crutches, stationery, and clothing, many of these handmade donations from women's organizations.

== Origins ==
John A. Fowle and Elida Rumsey, wartime relief workers who married in 1863, founded the Soldiers' Free Library in Washington, D.C. during the American Civil War. They formalized their plan in 1862, with a circular in 1862 seeking donations of suitable "hospital reading" for the troops. The couple, especially Rumsey, sang patriotic songs (some of them written by Fowle) at benefit concerts to raise funds for the library. Rev. Theodore T. Munger and Mrs. Walter Baker of Dorchester, Boston were major donors and organizers from the beginning of the effort.

== During the war ==
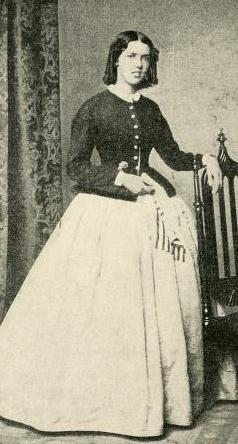
Elida Rumsey, co-founder of the Soldiers' Free Library, from an 1862 photograph published in 1897.

The Soldiers' Free Library opened in October 1862, initially housed in the Rumsey family home, with Elida Rumsey as unofficial librarian. It held about 1,500 books, and hundreds of magazines at the start. Soon the donations overwhelmed the space available. A convalescent soldier, Samuel K. Crozier of the 124th Pennsylvania, took over librarian duties, and separate quarters were arranged. The library was specifically open to military and civilian patrons of any race.

Donations continued to arrive; beyond books, the library offered each soldier visitor an apple, a gingerbread cake, and embossed stationery on New Years' Day in 1863. In the spring of 1863, a building in Judiciary Square was given for the use of the library by the United States Department of the Interior, providing storage for donated medical supplies, food, and clothing, as well as books and a reading room. Tables, ink, and postage were provided for soldiers to write and send letters. Crozier was succeeded as librarian by Philo Tower, a New York soldier who had been a clergyman in civilian life, and enjoyed giving lectures about the library's work.

The Soldiers' Free Library grew to hold approximately six thousand books and other monographs. Popular donations were Bibles, Shakespeare, and Uncle Tom's Cabin, but the collection also included stories for young readers, scientific texts, Charles Dickens' novels, poetry collections, hymnals, and histories. Donors, including grateful patrons, gave the library subscriptions to popular magazines. The library also provided space for concerts for wounded soldiers, classes, prayer meetings, and church services.

== After the war ==
After the war, the books from the library were donated to the YMCA, and the building to the Freedmen's Bureau. The building was demolished in 1873; its location became the site of a government office building in 1885. Philanthropist Andrew Carnegie recognized Fowle and Rumsey as "pioneers" in the creation of free libraries, saying "In your footsteps I simply follow." Elida Rumsey Fowle later started a free library in Dorchester, Boston, and sent books to soldiers in the Spanish-American War and to Indian schools in Alaska. The records of the Soldiers' Free Library are held by the Dorchester Historical Society.
