= Massachusetts State House =

Capitol building of the U.S. state of Massachusetts

- U.S. National Register of Historic Places
- U.S. National Historic Landmark
- U.S. National Historic Landmark District – Contributing property
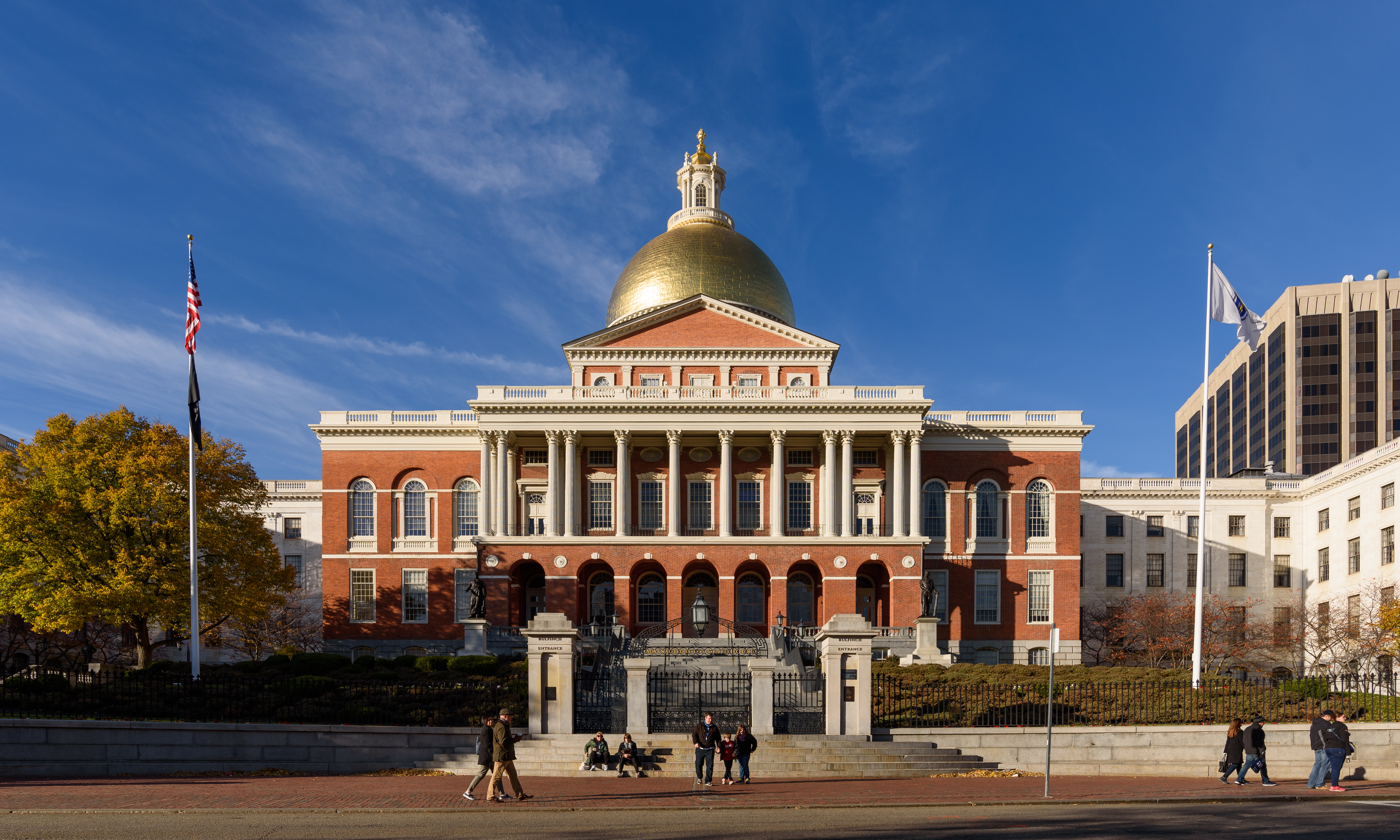
- The Massachusetts State House in Boston, November 2016
- Interactive map of Massachusetts State House
- Location: 24 Beacon Street; Boston, Massachusetts
- Coordinates: 42°21′29.4″N 71°3′49.3″W
- Built: 1795–1798
- Architects: Charles Bulfinch, Charles Brigham; Sturgis, Bryant, Chapman & Andrews
- Architectural style: Federal architecture
- Part of: Beacon Hill Historic District (ID66000130)
- NRHP reference No.: 66000771

Significant dates
- Added to NRHP: October 15, 1966
- Designated NHL: December 19, 1960
- Designated NHLDCP: October 15, 1966

The Massachusetts State House, also known as the Massachusetts Statehouse or the New State House, is the state capitol and seat of government for the Commonwealth of Massachusetts, located in the Beacon Hill neighborhood of Boston. The building houses the Massachusetts General Court (state legislature) and the offices of the Governor of Massachusetts. The building, designed by architect Charles Bulfinch, was completed in January 1798 at a cost of $133,333 (more than five times the budget), and has repeatedly been enlarged since. It is one of the oldest state capitols in current use. It is considered a masterpiece of Federal architecture and among Bulfinch's finest works, and was designated a National Historic Landmark for its architectural significance.

== History ==
The Masonic cornerstone ceremony took place on July 4, 1795, with Paul Revere, then Grand Master of the Grand Lodge of Massachusetts, presiding. Before the current State House was completed in 1798, Massachusetts's government house was the Old State House on what is now Washington Street. For the building's design, architect Charles Bulfinch made use of two existing buildings in London: William Chambers's Somerset House, and James Wyatt's Pantheon.

After Maine separated from Massachusetts and became an independent state in 1820, Charles Bulfinch designed Maine's capitol building with architectural influence of the Massachusetts Capitol building with a simplified Greek Revival influence.

The Commonwealth completed a major expansion of the original building in 1895, designed by Charles Brigham of Boston. In 1917, the east and west wings, designed by architects Sturgis, Bryant, Chapman & Andrews, were completed.

In July 2016, Governor Charlie Baker proposed to the state legislature to sell 300 square feet (28 m^{2}) of permanent easement on the west side of the State House lawn to a neighboring condominium development. The land in question was once pasture owned by John Hancock, Massachusetts's first elected governor, and the easement would allow for the addition of au pair units. Through legislation passed by the legislature the land surrounding the state house is considered "open space".

== Building and grounds ==
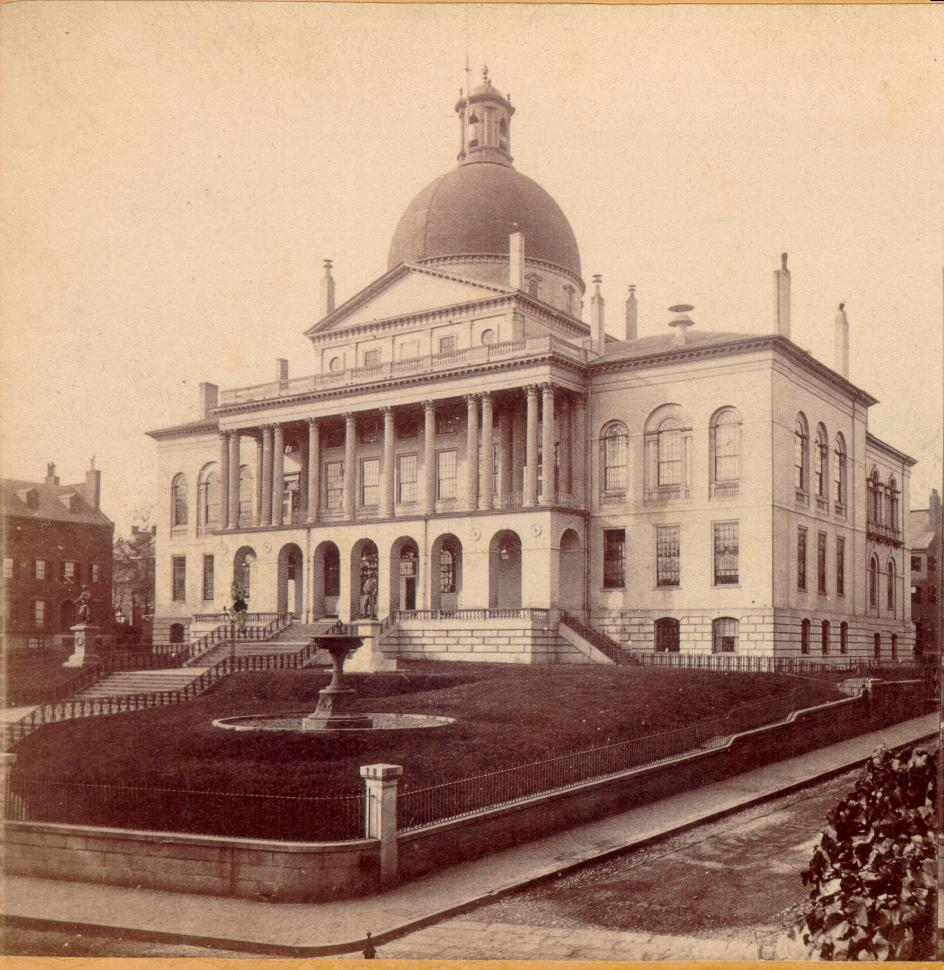
Stereograph image of the State House c. 1862, before wings were added to the building

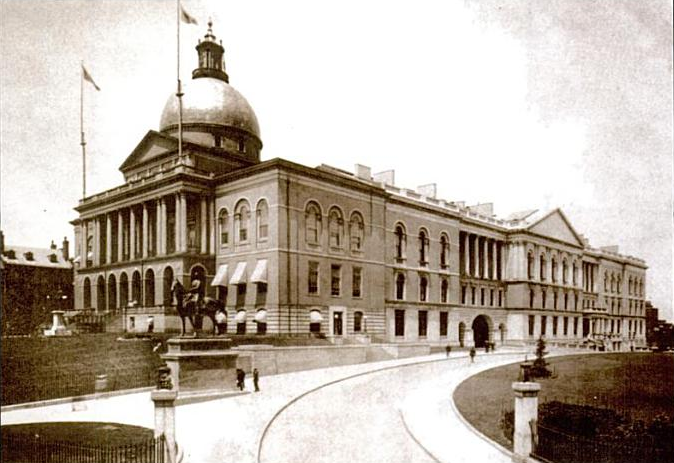
The building c. 1895

The building is situated on 6.7 acres (2.7 ha) of land on top of Beacon Hill in Boston, opposite the Boston Common on Beacon Street. It was built on land once owned by John Hancock. Today the building officially functions and is maintained under the auspices of the Superintendent of the Bureau of the State House.

=== Dome ===
The original wood dome, which leaked, was covered with copper in 1802 by Paul Revere's Revere Copper Company.

The dome was first painted gray and then light yellow before being gilded with gold leaf in 1874. During World War II, the dome was painted gray once again, to prevent reflection during blackouts and to protect the city and building from bombing attacks. The dome was re-gilded in 1969, at a cost of $36,000. Then, in July 1997, the dome was once again re-gilded, in 23k gold. The estimated cost this time was around $300,000.

The dome is topped with a gilded, wooden pine cone, symbolizing both the importance of Boston's lumber industry during early colonial times and of the state of Maine, which was a district of the Commonwealth when the Bulfinch section of the building was completed.

=== Statuary ===
In front of the building are multiple important statues. Right in front of the General Hooker Memorial entrance stands an equestrian statue of General Joseph Hooker. Daniel Webster, the famous statesman and orator, stands near the front steps holding a scroll. Horace Mann, the educational reformer and politician, is positioned near the front colonnade. John F. Kennedy is depicted as a mid-stride figure on the west wing lawn. Henry Cabot Lodge, a U.S. Senator, stands on the front grounds as well. Along with these men are also a couple statues of important women as well. Anne Hutchinson is located on the lawn below the west wing, honoring her work as a religious dissident and pioneer and Mary Dyer is Positioned on the lawn below the east wing, depicting the Quaker martyr who was hanged in Boston.

Inside the building are many other statues as well. Doric Hall holds two full-sized statues, one of President George Washington and one of Governor John Andrew. Busts of Washington, President Abraham Lincoln, and Governor John Hancock can also be found in this room. Right next to Doric Hall, and the former Entrance to the Statehouse, is where the "Hear Us" memorial is located. This is where the heads of Dorothea Dix (1802-87), Florence Luscomb (1887-1985), Mary Kenney O’Sullivan (1864-1943), Sarah Parker Remond (1814-94), Josephine St. Pierre Ruffin (1842-1924), and Lucy Stone (1818-93).

Bartlett Hall holds a statue of William Francis Bartlett, a Major General during Civil War, as well as Busts of Henry Cabot Lodge, grandfather and grandson. Nurses Hall, right behind, holds a large statue called the Civil War Army Nurses Memorial depicting an American Civil War scene in which a nurse is at the aid of a fallen Union Soldier.

In the Senate Chamber, Busts of the Following men line the room: George Washington, the Marquis de Lafayette, Charles Sumner, Abraham Lincoln, Ben Franklin, Henry Wilson, and Frederick Douglass.

=== Interior ===
The original red-brick Bulfinch building contains the Governor's offices (on the west end) with the Massachusetts Senate occupying the former House of Representatives Chamber under the dome. The Massachusetts House of Representatives occupies a chamber on the west side of the Brigham addition. Hanging over this chamber is the "Sacred Cod", which was given to the House of Representatives in 1784 by a Boston merchant. The Sacred Cod symbolizes the importance of the fishing industry to the early Massachusetts economy.

The House Chamber is decorated with murals by Albert Herter, father of Massachusetts Gov. Christian Herter. Murals on the second floor under the dome were painted by artist Edward Brodney. Brodney won a competition to paint the first mural in a contest sponsored by the Works Progress Administration in 1936. It is entitled "Columbia Knighting Her World War Disabled". Brodney could not afford to pay models, and friends and family posed. The model for Columbia was Brodney's sister Norma Brodney Cohen, and the model for the soldier on one knee in the foreground was his brother Fred Brodney. In 1938, he painted a second mural under the dome called "World War Mothers". The models were again primarily friends and family members, with sister Norma sitting beside their mother Sarah Brodney.

Above the murals, the names of 53 Massachusetts citizens honored in 1895 were inscribed: Carver, Bradford, Endecott, Winthrop, Vane, Pickering, Knox, Lincoln, John Adams, Dane, Quincy, J. Q. Adams, Webster, Sumner, Wilson, Andrew, Choate, Parsons, Shaw, Story, Everett, Phillips, Garrison, Mann, Howe, Allen, Devens, Bartlett, Putnam, Franklin, Bowditch, Peirce, Agassiz, Bulfinch, Morse, Morton, Bell, Bancroft, Prescott, Motley, Parkman, Emerson, Hawthorne, Holmes, Bryant, Longfellow, Lowell, Whittier, Copley, Hunt, Edwards, Channing, Brooks.

A staircase in front of the Bulfinch building leads from Beacon Street to Doric Hall inside the building. The large main doors inside Doric Hall are only opened on three occasions:

1. When the President of the United States or a foreign head of state visits.
2. When the Governor exits the building on his or her last day in office. The Governor descends the staircase, crosses Beacon Street, and enters Boston Common, symbolically rejoining the people of Massachusetts as a private citizen.
3. When a regimental flag is returned from battle. Since the regimental flags now return to Washington, D.C., this has not been done since the Vietnam War.

Memorial Hall, also known as the Hall of Flags, is a room that sits central to the state house's second floor. The room displays regiment flags of returning Massachusetts soldiers from various regiments across every war since the Civil War. The stained glass skylight above contains the seals of the original Thirteen Colonies of the United States, with the Massachusetts seal in the center.

The Samuel Adams and Paul Revere time capsule is a metal box located in a cornerstone of the State House, placed there in the late 18th century and rediscovered in 2014. The contents include coins, newspaper clippings, and other historical artifacts.

== Offices ==
=== Constitutional officers ===
- Governor and Lieutenant Governor (Room 360)
- Governor's Council (Room 184)
- Secretary of the Commonwealth (Room 340)
- Treasurer and Receiver-General (Room 227)
- Auditor (Room 230)

=== Legislature ===
The majority of State House office space is given over to the Legislature. Every member of the House and Senate is assigned an office. Large third-floor suites are assigned to the House Speaker (Room 356) and Senate President (Room 332). Other offices include the House and Senate clerks, House and Senate counsel, and Legislative Information Services.

=== Press ===
One corridor of the building's fourth floor is a sort of Newspaper Row, anchored by the large Press Gallery suite where reporters from a range of publications maintain desks. The central Press Gallery room was given to use of reporters by the Legislature in 1909. The Massachusetts State House Press Association, established in 1909, governs these shared workspaces. Some individual news outlets have separate offices.

- Press Gallery—Headquarters of State House reporters for Associated Press, WWLP-TV, the Eagle-Tribune papers, Lowell Sun, WGBH-FM, Springfield Republican/Masslive, and Politico
- State House News Service newsroom
- WBUR-FM State House bureau
- Boston Globe State House bureau
- Kevin McNicholas Room, a shared space for broadcast stations

=== Veterans' organizations ===
A suite of rooms on the fifth floor is home to the Massachusetts headquarters of several veterans' groups, including the American Legion, American Legion Auxiliary, AMVETS, Disabled American Veterans, Italian American War Veterans of the United States, Jewish War Veterans of the United States of America, Korean War Veterans, Marine Corps League, Military Order of the Purple Heart, Persian Gulf Era Veterans, Polish Legion of American Veterans, Veterans of Foreign Wars, and Vietnam Veterans of America.

== "Hub of the Solar System" nickname ==
One of Boston's most enduring nicknames, "The Hub of the Universe", stems from a remark by Oliver Wendell Holmes from his 1858 book The Autocrat of the Breakfast-Table in which he mentions the State House: "A jaunty-looking person ... said there was one more wise man's saying that he had heard; it was about our place—but he didn't know who said it. ... Boston State-House is the Hub of the Solar System. You couldn't pry that out of a Boston man if you had the tire of all creation straightened out for a crow-bar".

== Gallery ==
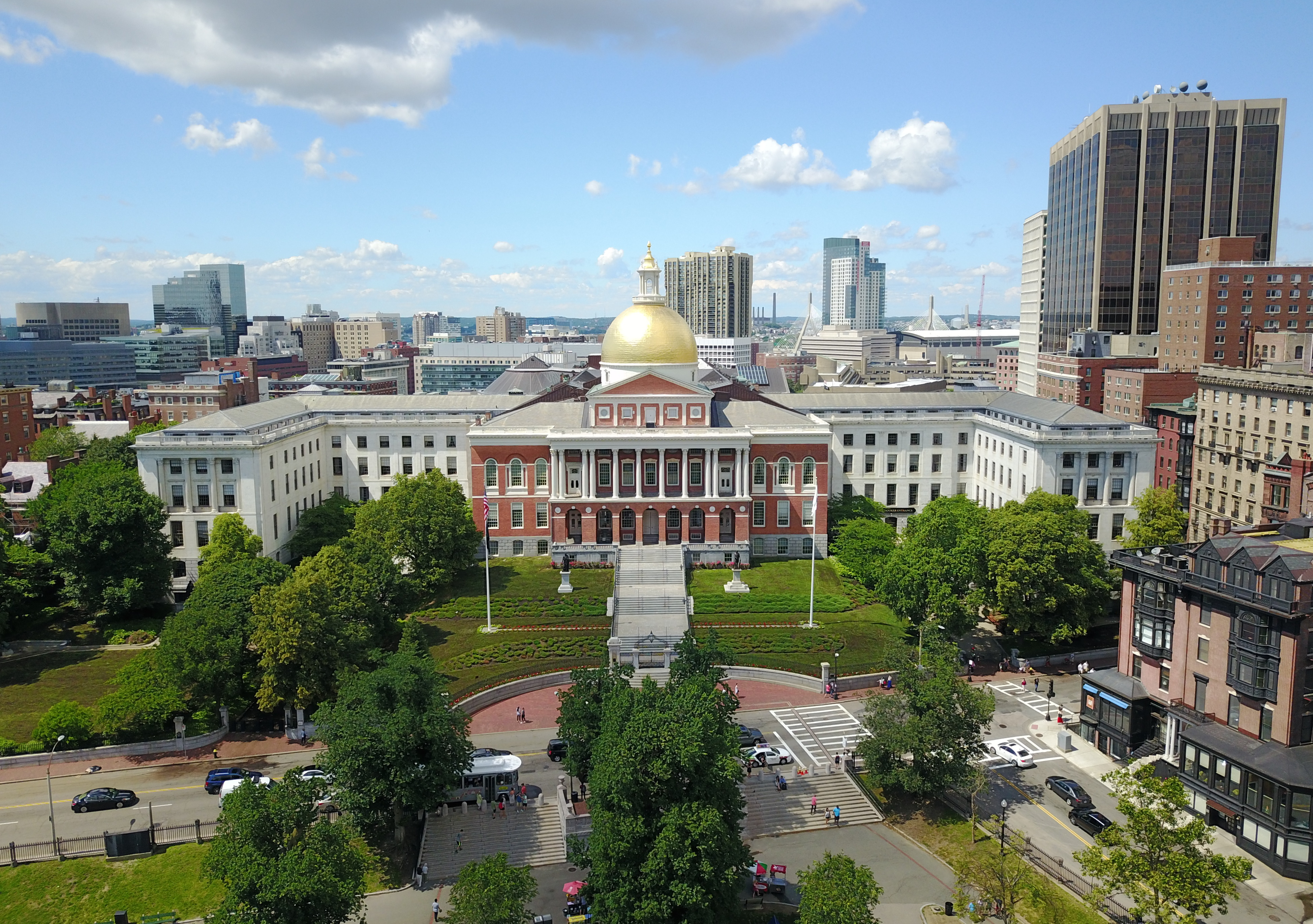
View from above Boston Common

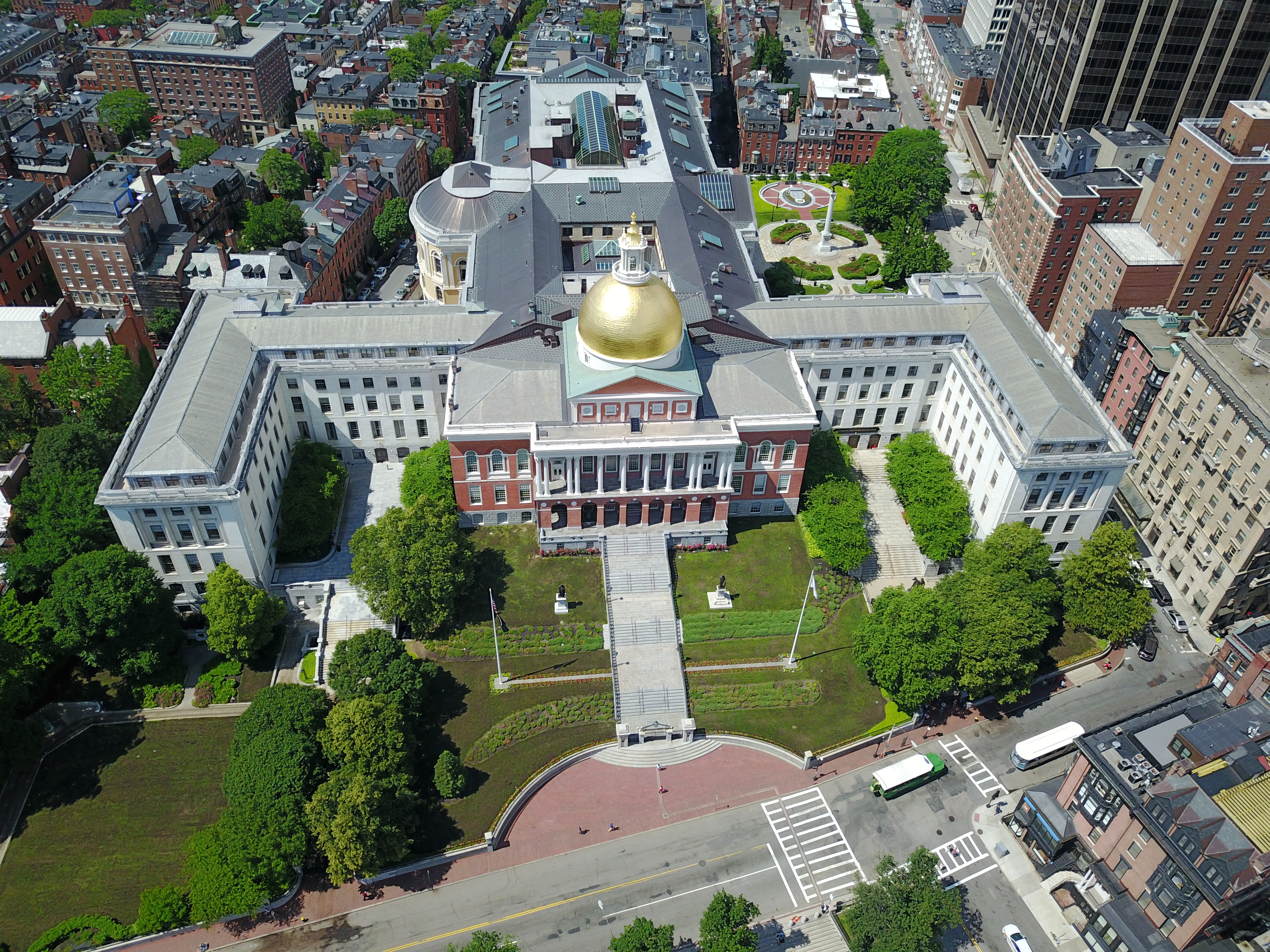
Aerial view

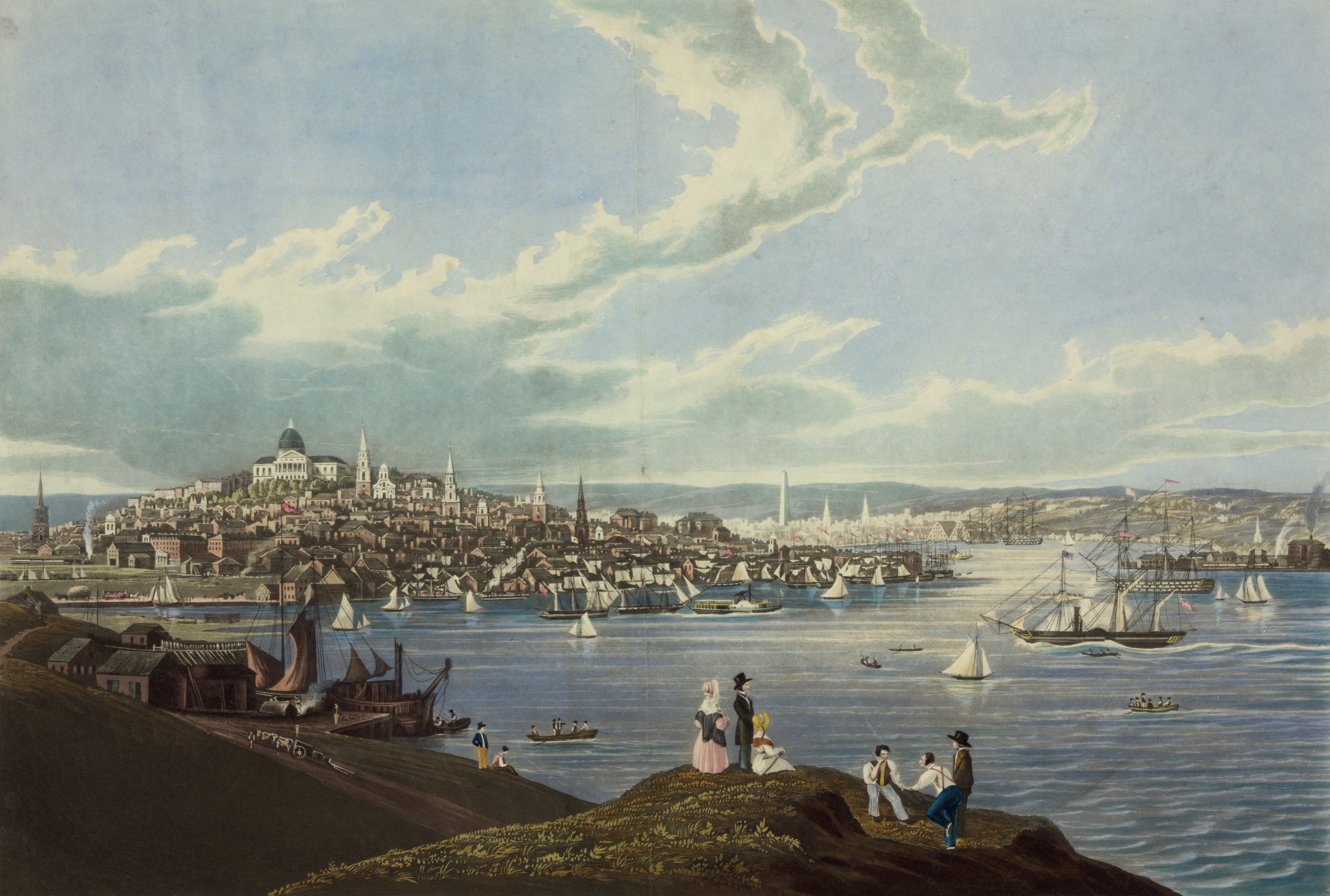
1841 drawing of the city and State House

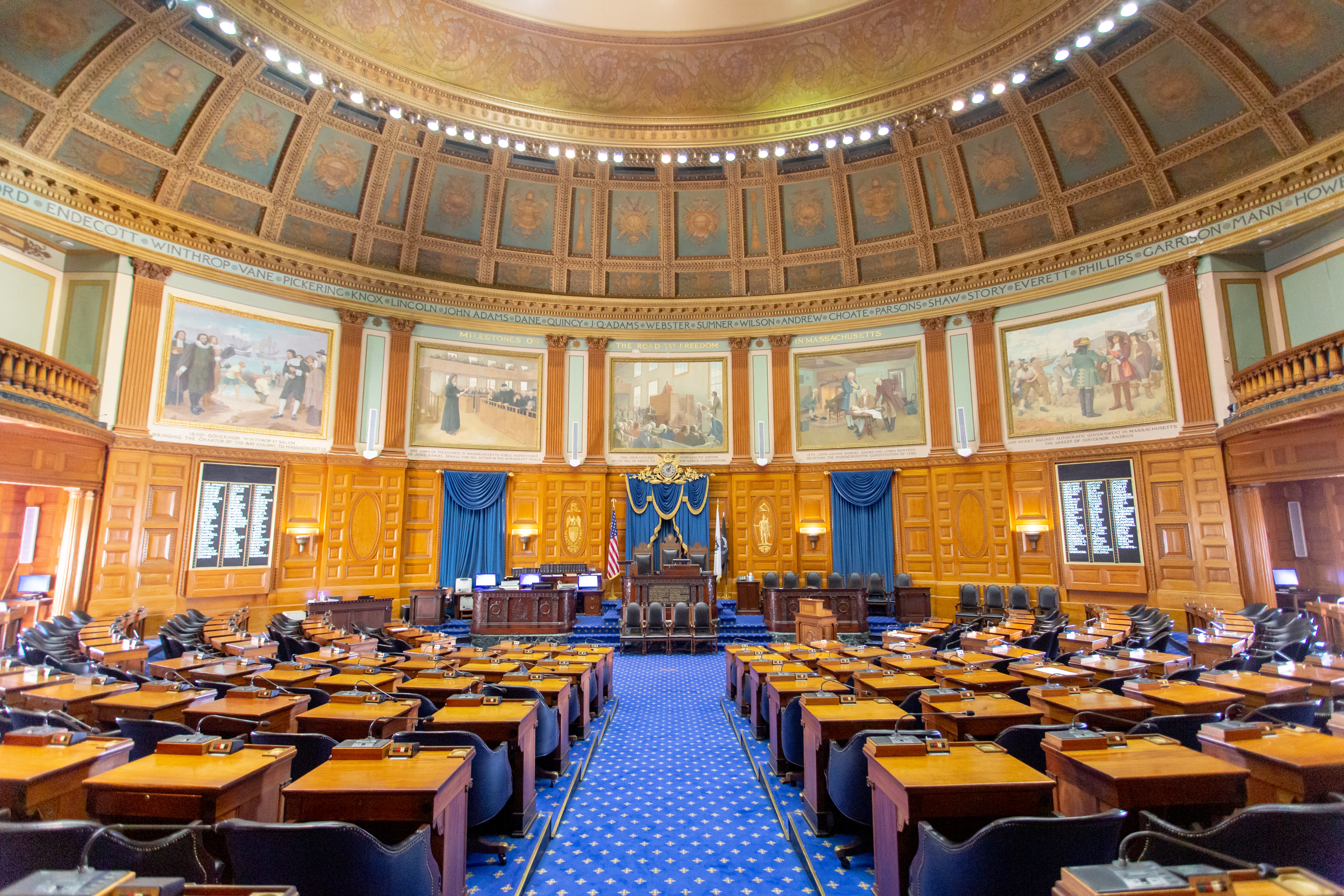
House chamber

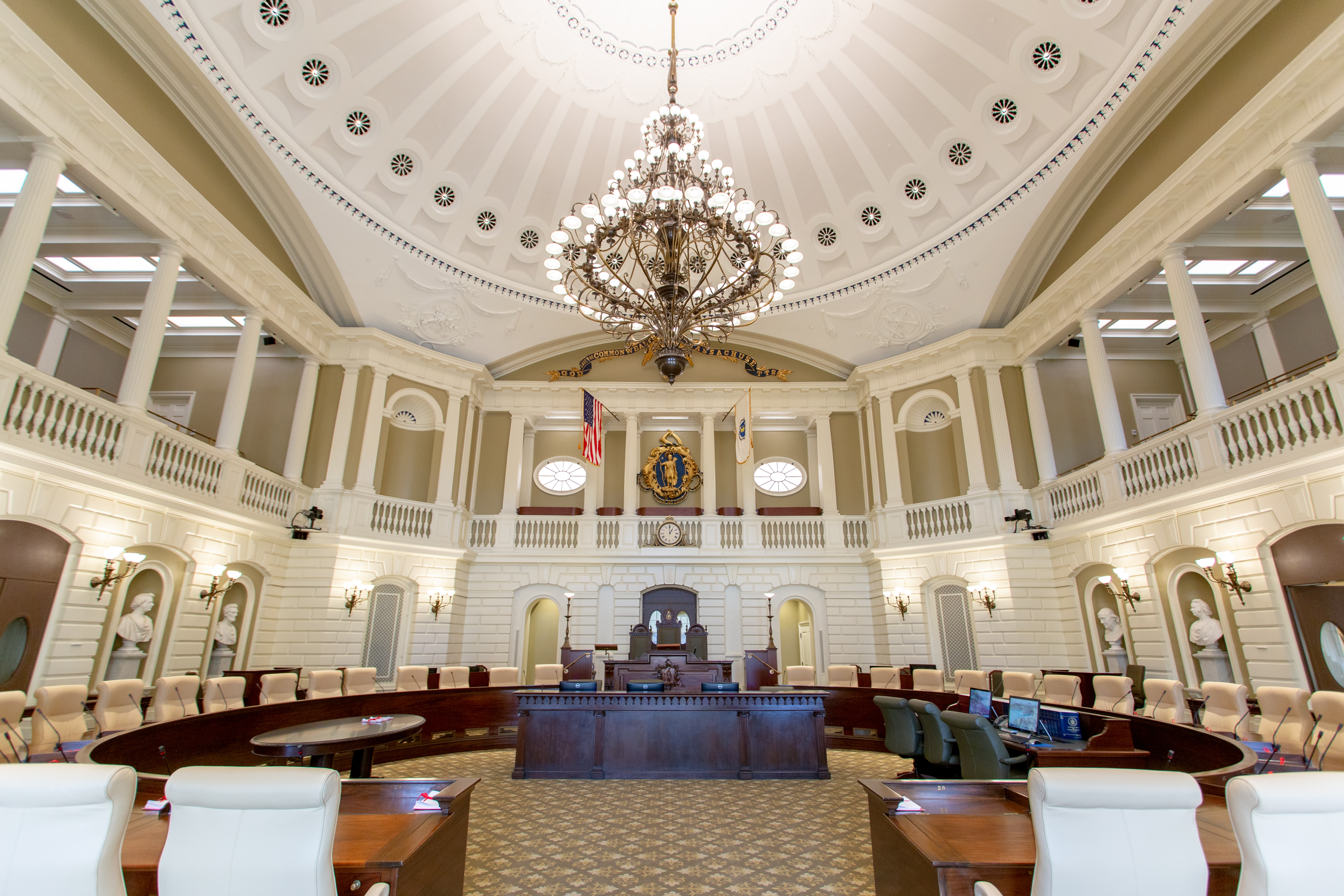
Senate Chamber

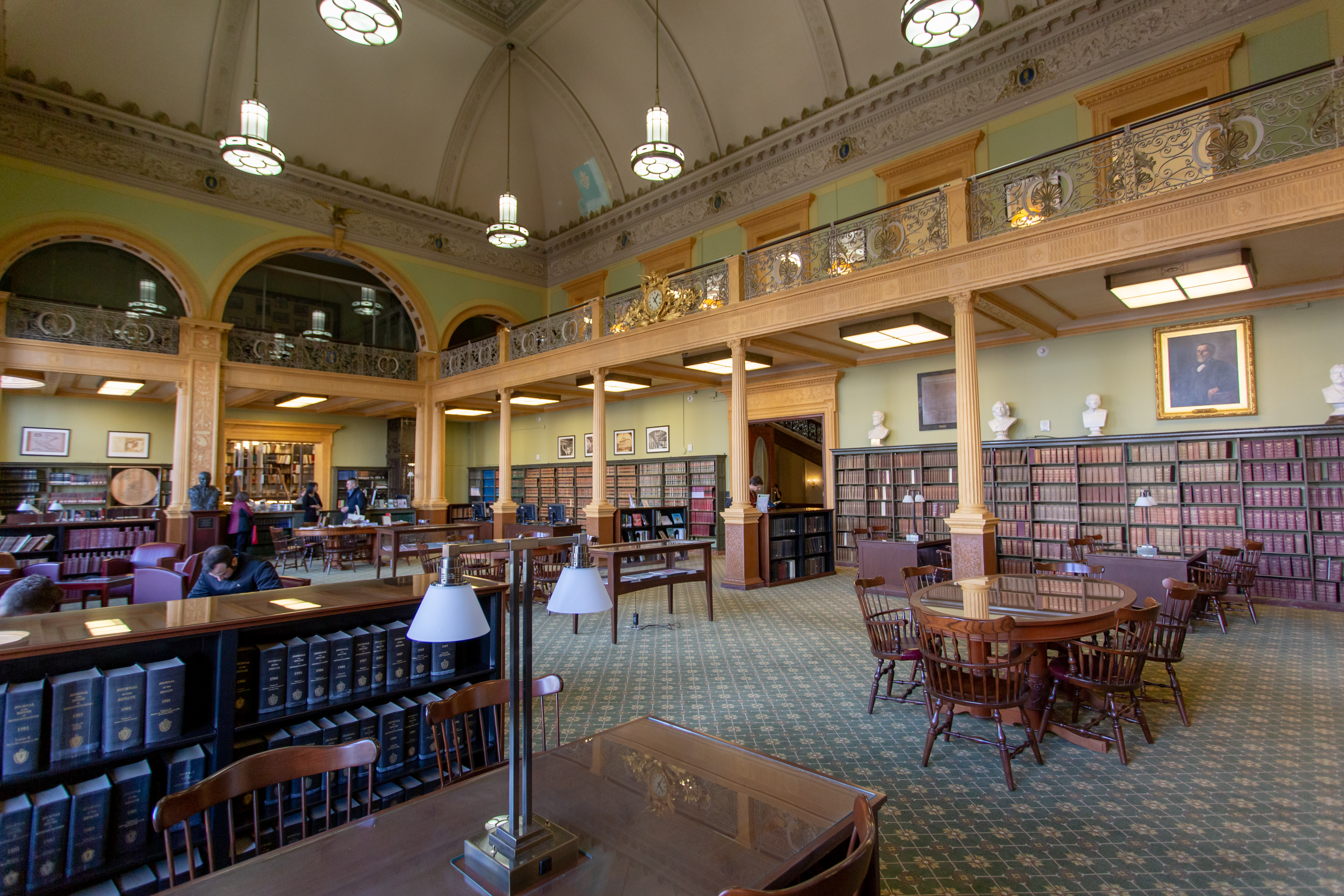
State Library of Massachusetts reading room

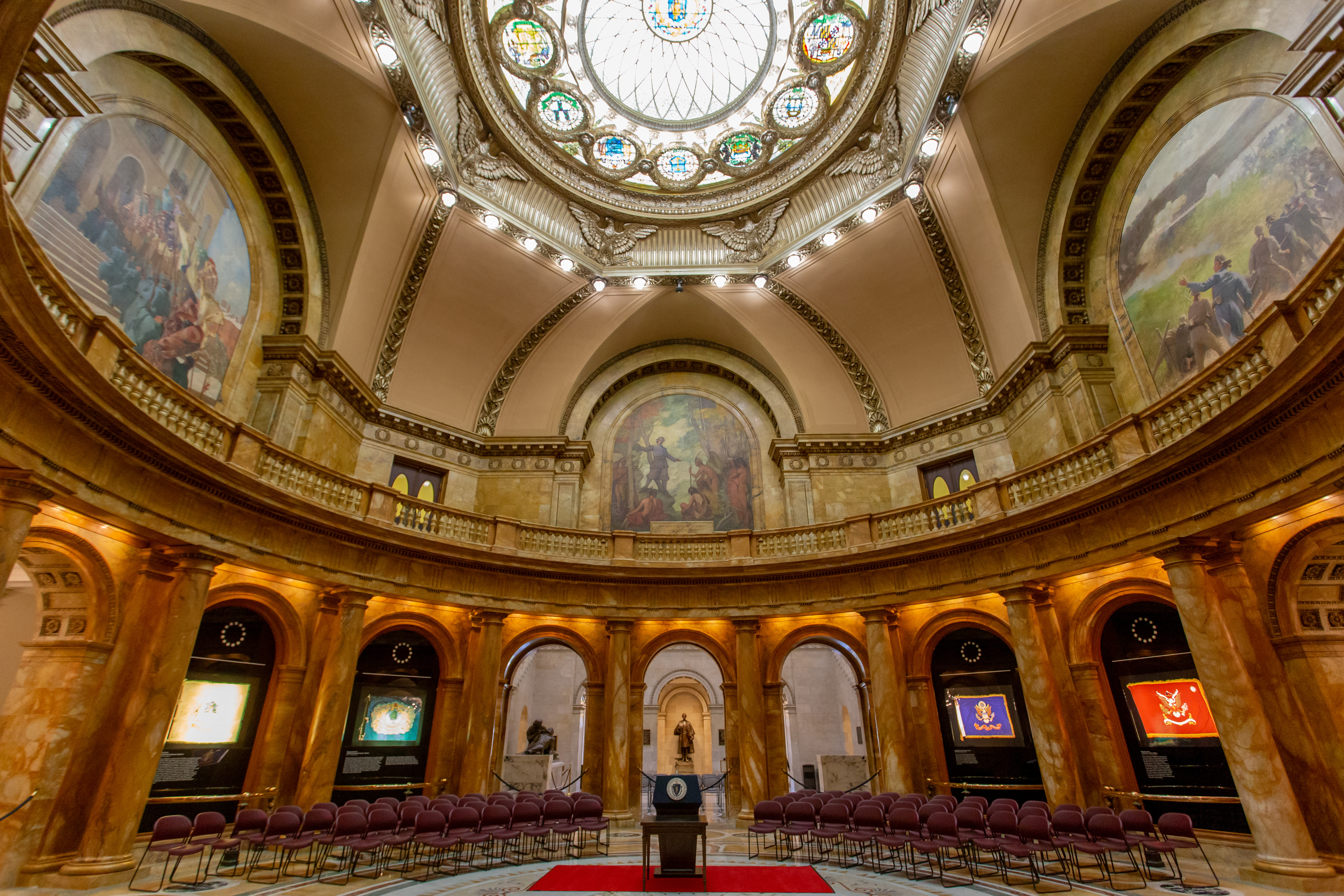
Rotunda

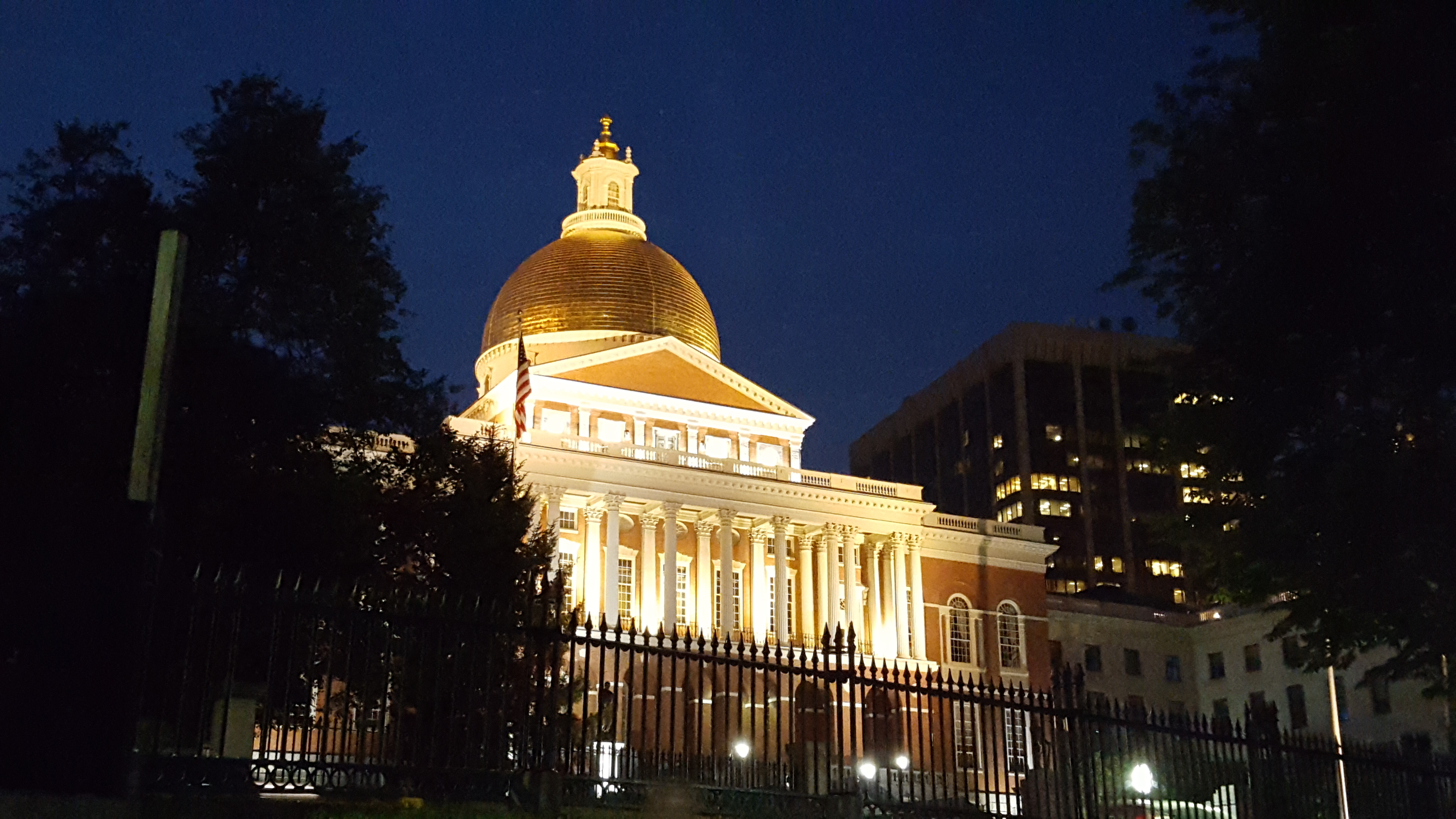
Statehouse at night, 2015

== See also ==
- List of National Historic Landmarks in Boston
- National Register of Historic Places listings in northern Boston
- List of state and territorial capitols in the United States
- Statue of Henry Cabot Lodge
- 18th-century Western domes

== Sources ==
- Bridgman, Arthur Milnor (1908) A Souvenir of Massachusetts legislators. Stoughton, Mass.: A.M. Bridgman.
- Cupolas of Capitalism – State Capitol Building Histories (L-ME) (1998–2005). Cupola.com. May 17, 2005.
- The Evolution of the State House (2005). Interactive State House. Mass.gov . May 17, 2005.
- Jenkins, Candace; Ann Beha Associates; Society for the Preservation of New England Antiquities; Massachusetts Division of Capital Planning and Operations (1985). The State House, historic structure report.
- Kirker, Harold (1969) Architecture of Charles Bulfinch. Cambridge, Massachusetts: Harvard University Press.

Preceded by Boston Common	Locations along Boston's Freedom Trail; Massachusetts State House	Succeeded by Park Street Church
