= SRSD =

SRSD may stand for:

- Seine River School Division in Lorette, Manitoba, Canada
- Southern Regional School District in Manahawkin, New Jersey, USA
- South Redford School District in Redford, Michigan, USA
- Sto-Rox School District in Alleghany County, Pennsylvania, USA
