= Redford Township District No. 5 School =

- U.S. National Register of Historic Places
- Michigan State Historic Site
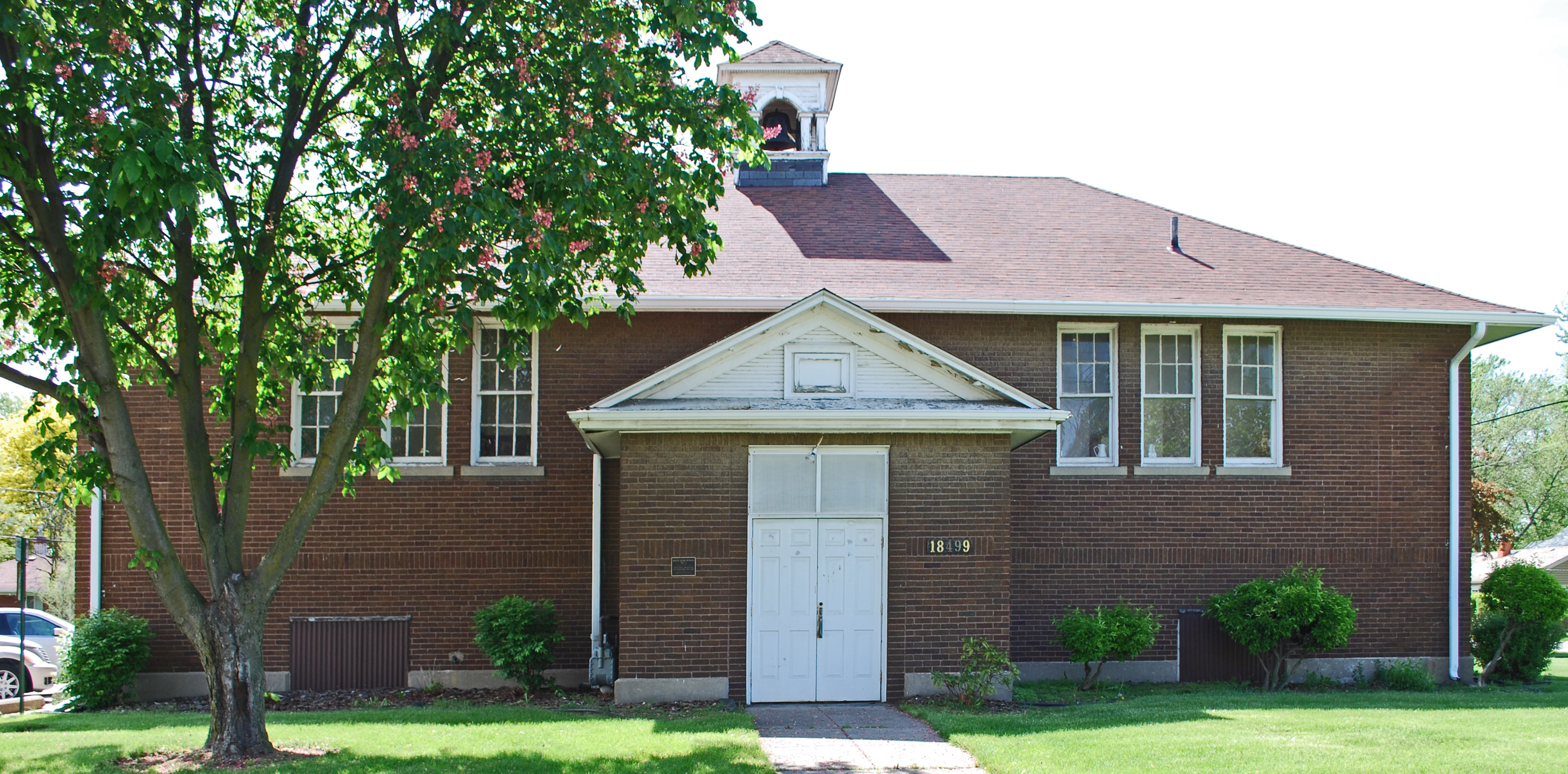

- Location within Michigan Location within the United States
- Interactive map
- Location: 18499 Beech Daly Rd., Redford, Michigan
- Coordinates: 42°25′28″N 83°17′50″W
- Area: less than one acre
- Architectural style: Colonial Revival
- NRHP reference No.: 97000279

Significant dates
- Added to NRHP: March 28, 1997
- Designated MSHS: March 17, 1994

The Redford Township District No. 5 School is a school building located at 18499 Beech Daly Road in Redford, Michigan. After 1923, the school was known as the Redford Union District No. 1 School, and the building was also called the Beech Road School. It is now known as the John C. Raeside Administration Building. It was designated a Michigan State Historic Site in 1994 and listed on the National Register of Historic Places in 1997.

== History ==
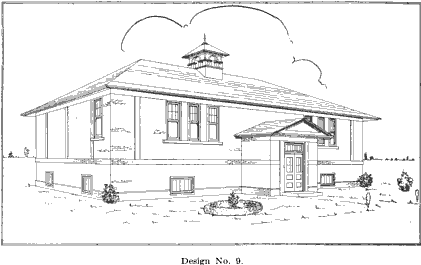
Drawing of school plan from 1915-1916 Annual Report of the Superintendent of Public Instruction of the State of Michigan

The building on this site is the third school building to be constructed here. The first Redford Township District No. 5 School was a log building constructed c. 1842. The second school was a wood-frame structure built in the 1870s. The building currently on this site was built at some time between 1916 and 1921.

It is likely that this new school was constructed in response to the increased suburbanization of Redford Township and the consequent increase in the student population. In fact, from 1917 to 1920, the number of students attending Redford Township District No. 5 School increased from 47 to 76.

In 1923, six of Redford's school districts, including district No. 5, consolidated to form Union School District No. 1. After consolidation, this school was used as an elementary school until 1961. An annex containing seven classrooms was constructed behind the school in the later 1950s. From 1960 to 1982, the building was used as the board of education headquarters. After 1982, it functioned as the district's instructional materials center, and now houses administrative offices for the district.

== Description ==
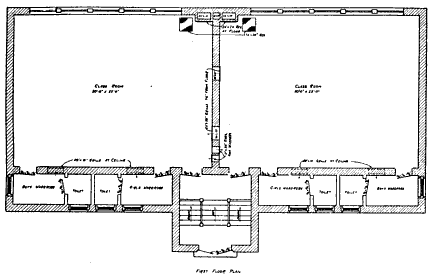
First floor plan

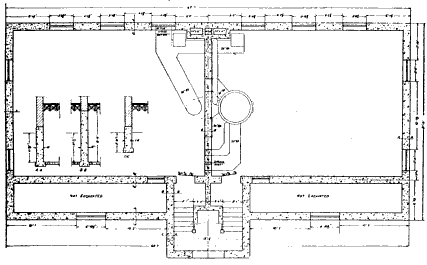
Second floor plan

The Redford Township District No. 5 School is a one-story red brick school building with a hipped roof and a concrete foundation with raised basement. The front facade is symmetrical, with a projecting vestibule sheltering the central main entrance, flanked by three six-over-one double-hung windows on each side. The side facades originally had single windows; however, these have been boarded over, as have the basement windows. The roof is crowned with a belfry with arched openings. Exterior decoration is minimal, with a single brick beltcourse separating the basement and main floor, and vertical piers on the front and sides.

The interior of the school consists of two classrooms on the main floor and a two-room basement.

== Significance ==
The school was built using stock plans available free of charge from the state superintendent of public instruction to any school district desiring them. These plans were one of a set of ten first unveiled in the 1915-1916 Annual Report of the Superintendent of Public Instruction of the State of Michigan. These stock plans were created in response to legislation requiring the Superintendent's office to approve all school plans. Not only were the plans "calculated to meet the requirements of most districts, both as to cost of the building and the peculiarities of the local site," but they were supposed to exemplify the "modern rural school building," one that was "planned to observe both hygienic needs and the conveniences of schoolroom administration."

The Redford Township District No. 5 School is a rare surviving unremodeled example of a school featuring every detail of the original plans, including the belfry, simple decorative brickwork, and east-facing facade.
