= Sean Gong =

British engineer

- Born: Shaogang Gong
- Engineering career
- Employer: Queen Mary University of London
- Projects: Application of machine learning in video analysis
- Awards: FREng

Shaogang Gong, often shortened to Sean Gong, is an engineer and currently serves as Professor of Visual Computation at Queen Mary University of London. He is the head of the university's Computer Vision Group, and specialises in machine learning and video analysis.

== Research ==
Beginning in 1996, Gong's work and research has featured over 130 computer vision and pattern recognition conferences, including the Conference on Computer Vision and Pattern Recognition and European Conference on Computer Vision. In 2009, he co-wrote a comprehensive study into facial expression recognition software, which was published in the Image & Computing journal.

His research has led him to become involved with three separate companies as a result of his expertise. His roles in business have resulted in him winning multiple awards regionally, including the 2017 Queen Mary Academic Commercial Enterprise Award and the 2019 Queen Mary Innovation Award. He was also the recipient of the Global Frost & Sullivan Award in 2017 for innovation with the development of video forensic technology that could be used by law enforcement. This software was later acquired by Veritone in 2022.

Gong was elected a Fellow of the Royal Academy of Engineering in 2023.
