= Thurston High School (disambiguation) =

Thurston High School may refer to:

- Lee M. Thurston High School, Redford, Michigan
- Thurston High School, Springfield, Oregon

== See also ==
- North Thurston High School, Lacey, Washington
