= Mike Stefanski =

- Catching coordinator
- Born: September 12, 1969 (age 56); Flint, Michigan, U.S.
- Bats: Right Throws: Right

Michael Joseph Stefanski (born September 12, 1969) is an American former catcher in minor league baseball, and most recently the catching coordinator for the Cincinnati Reds.

== Playing career ==
Stefanski was selected by the Milwaukee Brewers in the 40th round of the 1991 Free-Agent Draft. He played his entire career in the minor leagues, where he played for multiple teams. He received numerous accolades, including a trip to the 1994 Texas League All-Star Game, and was California League Batter of the Week in May 1993. He was also won the 1991 Arizona League batting title with a batting average of .364. Stefanski played in the farm systems of the Reds, Brewers and St. Louis Cardinals. He appeared in 786 games as a catcher, and even pitched four games in relief, compiling a 5.40 earned run average.

On January 27, 2004 he retired as a player and joined the Reds staff as the bullpen catcher.

On December 4, 2013, he was promoted to the Reds' catching coordinator.

== Personal ==
Stefanski graduated from Redford Union High School in Redford, Michigan, in 1987, where he excelled in baseball and basketball. He attended the University of Detroit, where Stefanski was twice named All-Conference in baseball.
