= Redford Union High School =

High school in Redford, Michigan, United States

Location
- 17711 Kinloch Avenue; Redford, Michigan 48240; United States
- 42.42°N 83.303°W

Information
- School type: Public
- School district: Redford Union Schools
- Principal: Michael Taylor
- Teaching staff: 28.80 (on a FTE basis)
- Grades: 10–12
- Enrollment: 505 (2023–2024)
- Student to teacher ratio: 17.53
- Colors: Blue and gold
- Athletics conference: Western Wayne Athletic Conference
- Nickname: Panthers
- Website: www.redfordu.k12.mi.us/hs/

Student assessments
- 2021–22 school year Change vs. prior year

M-STEP 11th grade proficiency rates (Science / Social Studies)
- Advanced %: ≤5 / ≤5
- Proficient %: – / –
- PR. Proficient %: 10.7 / 54.5
- Not Proficient %: 78.7 / 36.4

Average test scores
- SAT Total: 809.2 (▼ −56.8)

Redford Union High School (RUHS) is a secondary school in Redford, Michigan, a suburb of Detroit. The school is affiliated with the Redford Union School District and serves grades 10-12.

== History ==
Redford Union High School's first graduating class matriculated in 1925. The current building was built in 1954.

== Demographics ==
The gender breakdown of the 744 students enrolled in 2014-2015 was:

- Male - 52.6%
- Female - 47.4%

The demographic breakdown was:

- Native American/Alaskan - 0.3%
- Asian/Pacific islanders - 0.4%
- Black - 57.0%
- Hispanic - 2.2%
- White - 36.8%
- Multiracial - 3.3%

64.0% of the students were eligible for free or reduced lunch.

== Athletics ==
The Redford Union Panthers are members of the Western Wayne Athletic Conference. The school colors are blue and gold. The following MHSAA sanctioned sports are offered:

- Baseball (boys)
- Bowling (boys and girls)
- Competitive cheer (girls)
- Cross country (boys and girls)
- Football (boys)
- Flag football (girls)
- Golf (boys)
- Soccer (boys and girls)
- Softball (girls)
- Swim and dive (boys and girls)
- Tennis (boys and girls)
- Track and field (boys and girls)
- Volleyball (boys and girls)
- Wrestling (boys)

The football team played their home games at Kraft Field, located at nearby Hilbert Middle School, until 2023. On September 6, 2024, the first football game was played at the new Bob Atkins Field built at Redford Union. In 1969, the boys track team won the state championship.

== Notable alumni ==
- Rickey Clark, former MLB pitcher (California Angels).
- Bill Fahey, former MLB catcher (Washington Senators, Texas Rangers, San Diego Padres, Detroit Tigers).
- Paul Waterman, businessman and CEO Castrol, CEO Elementis plc 2016
- Antoinette Harris, groundbreaking female football player.
- John Koza (class of 1960), co-inventor of the scratch-off lottery ticket.
- Mike Stefanski, former MiLB catcher, and the current catching coordinator for the Cincinnati Reds.
