= Toni Harris =

American football player (born 1996)

Profile
- Position: Safety

Personal information
- Born: July 29, 1996 (age 30); Detroit, Michigan

Career information
- High school: Redford Union High School (Redford, Michigan)
- College: East Los Angeles College (2017–2018); Central Methodist University (2019–2021)

Antoinette "Toni" Harris (born July 29, 1996) is an American former college football player who was a safety for Central Methodist University in the National Association of Intercollegiate Athletics (NAIA). She is the first woman to receive a full college football scholarship as a non-specialist, and the second woman to ever play football on scholarship.

== Early life and family ==
Antoinette Harris was born in Detroit, Michigan. She played football for her high school, Redford Union High School, in Redford, Michigan.

== College ==
Two years after graduating high school, Harris moved to California to play free safety at East Los Angeles College, where she played for two years (2018–19) under the direction of Head Coach Bobby Godinez. She became the first woman to ever play for East Los Angeles College. She received six offers to play football at four-year universities.

Harris graduated with honors from Central Methodist University with a Bachelor of Science in Criminal Justice. Her athletic eligibility remains available due to the COVID-19 pandemic. She has intended to pursue a Master’s of Science in Criminal Justice at the University of Southern California. She has not decided how she will use eligibility, but she plans to continue playing football.

== In media ==
In 2019, she was featured in a Super Bowl commercial for the Toyota RAV4.

== See also ==
- List of female American football players
