= Shreve, Crump & Low =

American jewelry business

- Formerly: Shreve's (before 1869)
- Founded: 1796; 230 years ago
- Founder: John McFarlane
- Headquarters: Boston, Massachusetts
- Website: shrevecrumpandlow.com

Shreve, Crump & Low, a Boston, Massachusetts business, is a jeweler in the United States established in 1796. They made trophies including the Davis Cup and the Cy Young Award.

== History ==
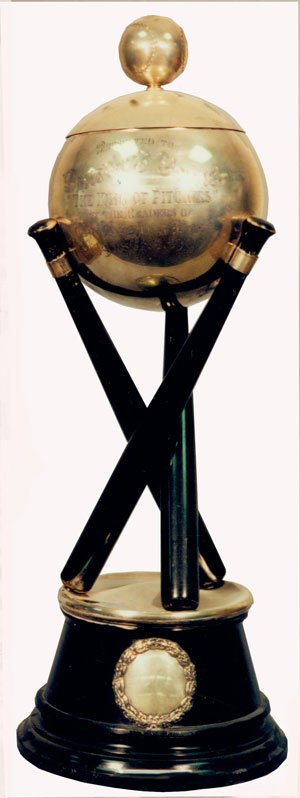
Shreve, Crump & Low built the Cy Young Award trophy.

Established in 1796 by watchmaker and silversmith John McFarlane, the company is one of the oldest jewelry stores in North America.

The present-day Shreve, Crump & Low is the last of a line of firms that began with John McFarlane, who opened a workshop across the street from Paul Revere. In the 1800s, the firm changed its name to Shreve's. In 1869 the firm of Shreve, Crump & Low was formed by merger.

Shreve, Crump & Low remained at their original location until their property was destroyed in the Great Boston Fire of 1872. Its new location at 225 Washington Street pioneered the use of plate glass and artificial lighting in a retail establishment. This Italianate building had showcases of black walnut trimmed with holly and ebony.

A relocation in 1891 brought Shreve, Crump & Low to its largest building, a six stories high Italian Renaissance style edifice of limestone and marble designed by Henry Forbes Bigelow. In 1929, Shreve, Crump & Low moved to 330 Boylston Street, one of the earliest examples of art deco architecture in New England. In 2006, under the ownership of local jeweler, David Walker, the firm opened a new store in Boston's Back Bay at the corner of Boylston and Berkeley Streets.

Shreve's has also sold antiques, imported fine linen and stationery, and exhibited artifacts from Ancient Greece and Rome. They have sold jewelry, timepieces, tableware, and Boston-themed gifts.

In 1974, Shreve, Crump & Low opened a second location at The Mall at Chestnut Hill, closed in 2009. In May 2012, the Boylston Street store relocated to 39 Newbury Street, Boston. In 2014, another store was opened in Greenwich, CT.

== Notable commissions ==
- In 1835, orator and Massachusetts State Senator Daniel Webster was presented with a 400-ounce silver vase from this firm that was later donated to the Boston Public Library.
- In 1840, Samuel Cunard was given a 30-inch Shreve's cup for helping to finance the RMS Britannia, the first steamship to travel between Liverpool and Boston.
- In 1848, trustees of the Massachusetts General Hospital presented William Thomas Green Morton with a Shreve's silver box for discovering anesthetic ether.
- In 1863, General George B. McClellan received a silver Shreve's box for his efforts in the American Civil War.
- In the 1870s, Shreve, Crump & Low began working in semi-precious metals, creating the chandelier and sounding board for Trinity Church, Boston and lighting for the Old South Church and the Parker House Hotel.
- In 1874 Shreve, Crump & Low installed lighting inlaid with semi precious stones in the Library Restaurant in the Rockingham Hotel, a building in the neo-colonial architectural style.
- In the 1880s, the firm provided lighting fixtures for patrons outside of Boston including the city hall in Providence, Rhode Island and King Kalakaua's Iolani Palace in Honolulu.
- In 1899, a Harvard University tennis player named Dwight F. Davis purchased a large trophy from Shreve's to be awarded to the winner of a tournament to which they challenged a team from the United Kingdom. It is now known as the Davis Cup.
- In 1908, Shreve's created a silver cup to honor Boston Red Sox hero Cy Young, which after his death became the Cy Young Award.
