= Woodbury Langdon =

American politician (1739–1805)

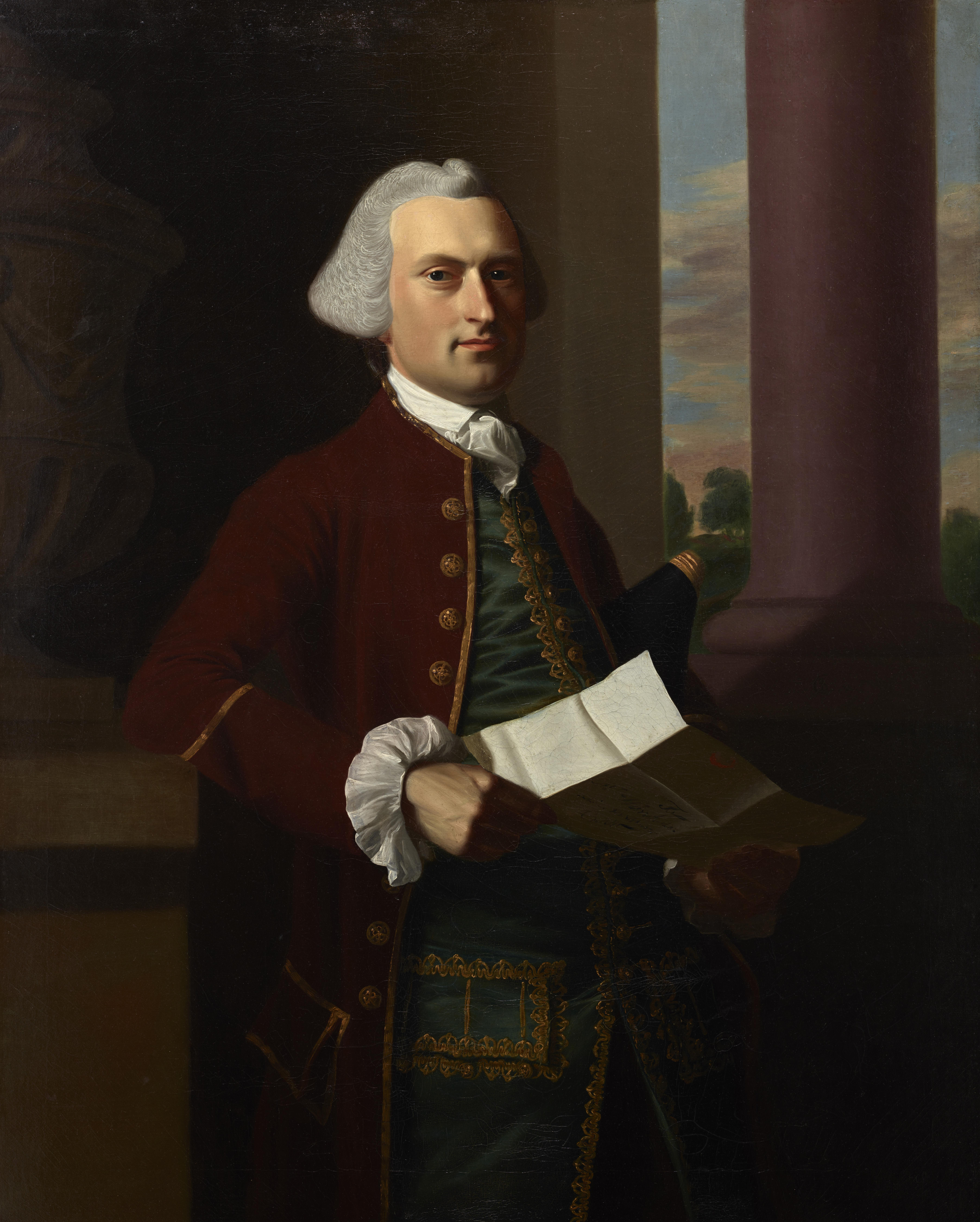
- 1767 portrait by John Singleton Copley
- Born: 1739; Portsmouth, New Hampshire
- Died: January 13, 1805; Portsmouth, New Hampshire
- Occupations: Merchant, statesman and justice
- Known for: Delegate from New Hampshire to the Continental Congress
- Spouse: Sarah Sherburne

Woodbury Langdon (1739 – January 13, 1805) was an American merchant, politician and justice from Portsmouth, New Hampshire. He was the brother of John Langdon, a Founding Father who served as both senator from and Governor of New Hampshire, and father-in-law of Edmund Roberts.

== Early life ==
Langdon attended the Latin grammar school at Portsmouth, then went into the counting house of Henry Sherburne, a prominent local merchant. He was described as a large, handsome man—indeed, a contemporary recalled that the three handsomest men of that era were George Washington, Lord Whitworth and Woodbury Langdon. Langdon's business success enabled him to build and furnish a substantial home on State Street. In 1781, his home was destroyed in a fire which started in the barn where the Music Hall now stands. He rebuilt the three-story brick mansion in 1785, called "the costliest house anywhere about," and occupied it for the remainder of his life.

== American Revolution ==
When the American Revolutionary War broke out in 1775, Langdon sailed to London to secure considerable monies he had invested there. The attempt was unsuccessful, and two years later he left empty-handed for New York. Upon arrival, British Commander-in-Chief General William Howe suspected Langdon's loyalty to the Crown, and consequently restricted him to the city. Entreaties to release Langdon, written both by his prominent friends in England and younger brother, John, were ignored. Nevertheless, in December 1777 he managed to escape.

If Langdon's leanings towards American Independence were at all uncertain before his confinement in Manhattan, they became unmistakable afterwards. In spring of 1779, he was elected as one of New Hampshire's delegates to the Continental Congress, serving a year. In 1780, 1781 and 1785 he was re-elected, but chose to remain in New Hampshire and serve at the revolutionary capital in Exeter, where he was a representative from 1778 to 1779 and a member of the Executive Council from 1781 to 1784.

== Post-Revolution ==
Langdon was appointed an associate justice of the New Hampshire Superior Court in 1782.

He resigned after a year despite the legislature's repeated requests that he remain in office. In 1786, he again accepted the job, and held it until January 1791. But on June 17, 1790, he became the first state superior court justice to be impeached. The New Hampshire House of Representatives voted 35–29 to impeach him for neglecting his duties, finding that he had failed to attend sessions of the court in outlying counties in order to pursue his commercial interests in Portsmouth. It also resented his charge that the legislature failed to provide honorable salaries for judges and interfered in court decisions, calling his conduct " ... impertinent and unbecoming to his office." The trial in the state senate was postponed, with Langdon resigning his position before it could commence.

In the meantime, President Washington had appointed him in December 1790 as a commissioner to settle Revolutionary War claims. Langdon attempted a comeback by running in two successive elections for Congress in New Hampshire's at-large district as the Democratic-Republican nominee in 1796 and an October 1797 special election, but he finished 6th in the former and lost to Peleg Sprague in the latter. A final campaign for this seat came in a November 1799 special election after Sprague declined to serve, but Langdon lost in a landslide to James Sheafe.

== Death and burial ==
Langdon died in Portsmouth on January 13, 1805, and was buried in the North Cemetery at Portsmouth.

== Family and descendants ==
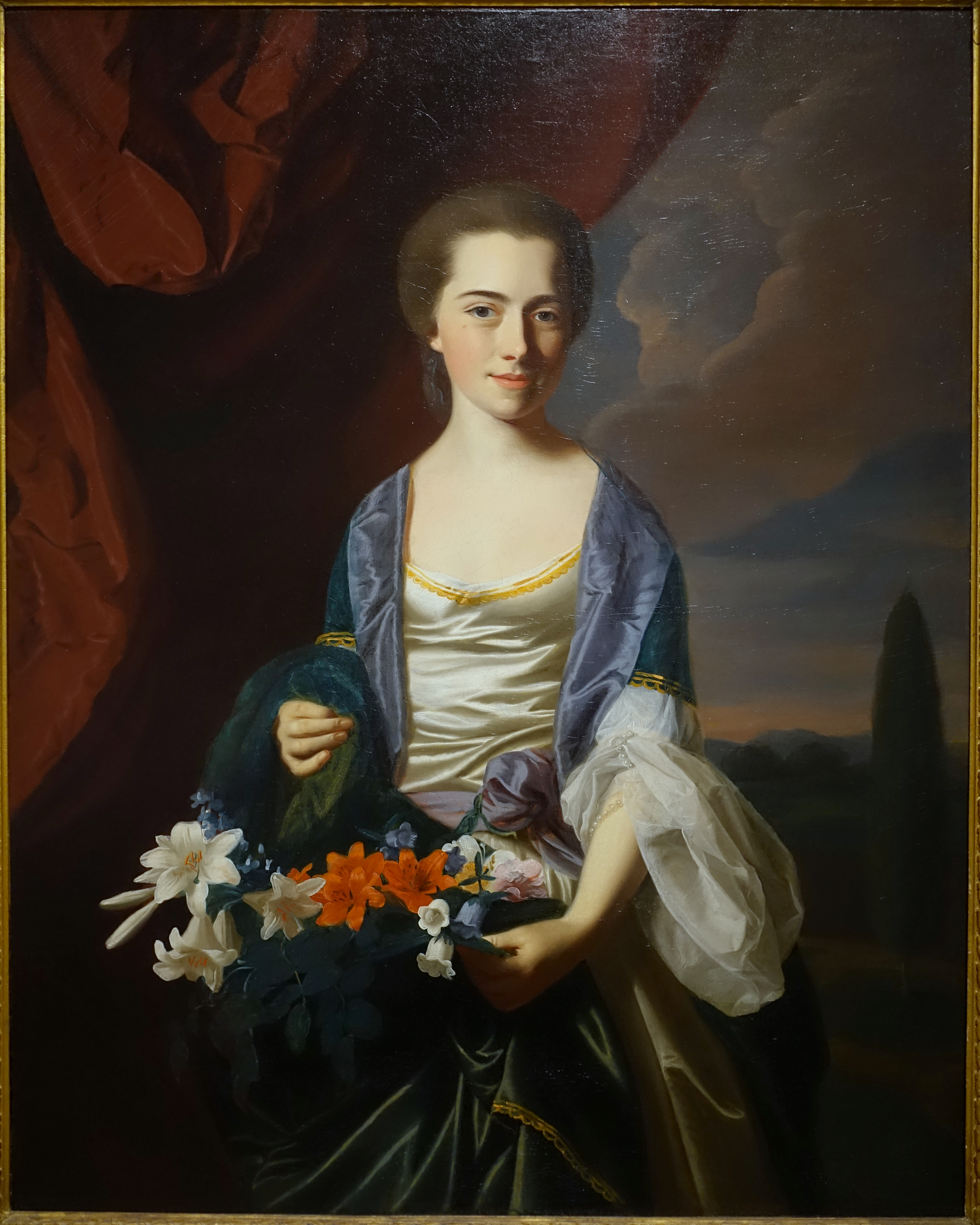
Portrait of Sarah Sherburne Langdon by John Singleton Copley, 1767, in the Dallas Museum of Art

In 1765, Langdon married Henry Sherburne's daughter Sarah, who was then 16. Their children included:

- Henry Sherburne Langdon (1766–1858), who married Ann Eustis, the sister of William Eustis. They had a son named John Agustine Langdon Eustis, who emigrated to Argentina and died in Buenos Aires in 1876. He had many descendants, who in turn married into the high society of Argentina, such as the Saenz Valiente, Pueyrredon, Obarrio and Beccar Varela families.
- Woodbury Langdon (1768–1770)
- Sarah Langdon (1770–1795), the wife of Robert Harris of Portsmouth
- Mary Ann Langdon (b. 1772)
- Amelia Langdon (b. 1773)
- Woodbury Langdon (b. 1774), who became a resident of New Orleans, and died without marrying
- Dorothy Wentworth Langdon (b. 1775)
- Caroline Langdon (1780–1865), the wife of William Eustis.
- John Langdon (1781–1852), who married Charlotte Ladd and relocated to Buffalo, New York
- Harriet (b. 1783)
- Joshua Brackett Langdon (b. 1784), who died at sea
- Walter Langdon (1786–1847), who married Dorothea Astor, the daughter of John Jacob Astor, and became a resident of Hyde Park, New York
- Catherine Whipple Langdon (1787–1839), the wife of Edmund Roberts of Portsmouth.

== Legacy ==
Governor and historian William Plumer reflected:

He was a man of great independence and decision - bold, keen and sarcastic, and spoke his mind of men and measures with great freedom ... .He was naturally inclined to be arbitrary and haughty, but his sense of what was right, and his pride prevented him from doing intentional evil.

Langdon's neoclassical mansion was purchased in 1830 by a company which converted it into an inn called The Rockingham House. In 1870, it was purchased by Frank Jones, local alemaker and hotelier, who had it remodeled and enlarged into the city's most fashionable hotel. A fire in 1884 badly damaged the building except for Woodbury Langdon's original dining room, which was retained when the hotel was rebuilt the following year. The Rockingham Hotel is today a condominium.

Langdon is mentioned on a New Hampshire historical marker, number 127 in Portsmouth, which is primarily about his brother.

== Sources ==
- United States Congress. "Woodbury Langdon (id: L000068)". Biographical Directory of the United States Congress.
- Biography at Seacoast New Hampshire website
- Brown, Mary E. (2001). The Impeachment Trial of the New Hampshire Supreme Court chief justice. Lynxfield Publishing. ISBN 0-9707172-1-0.
- Gurney, C. S. (1902), Portsmouth, Historic and Picturesque, The Lakeside Press, Portland, Maine
