= Rockingham Hotel =

- U.S. National Register of Historic Places
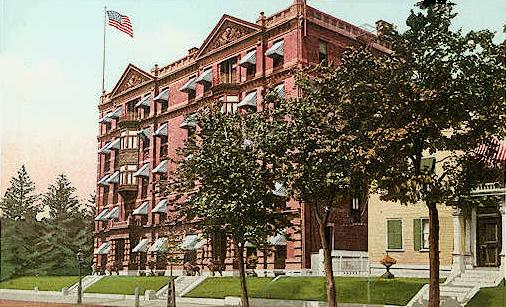

- Location within New Hampshire Location within the United States
- Location: 401 State St., Portsmouth, New Hampshire
- Coordinates: 43°4′31″N 70°45′34″W
- Area: 0.5 acres (0.20 ha)
- Built: 1885
- Architect: Multiple
- Architectural style: Colonial Revival
- NRHP reference No.: 82001693
- Added to NRHP: March 11, 1982

The Rockingham Hotel is a historic former hotel and contemporary condominium at 401 State Street in Portsmouth, New Hampshire, United States. Built in 1885, it is a prominent early example of Colonial Revival architecture, built in part in homage to Woodbury Langdon, whose 1785 home occupied the site. Langdon's home and the hotel both played host to leading figures of their day, and the hotel was one of the finest in northern New England. The hotel, now converted to condominiums, was added to the National Register of Historic Places in 1982.

== Description and history ==
The former Rockingham Hotel stands in downtown Portsmouth, on the north side of State Street between Middle and Fleet Streets. It is a five-story brick building, built in a conscious imitation of the 1785 home of Woodbury Langdon, a prominent merchant and politician which previously occupied the site. Its facade presents as two five-bay structures set side-by-side, each with a central entrance sheltered by a projecting rectangular portico. Two-story oriel window bays project above the entrances on the third and fourth floors. Stringcourses of brownstone trim separate the first and second floors, and the fourth and fifth floors. The building facade incorporates lions, terra cotta sculptures of the Four Seasons of Man, and busts of Langdon and Frank Jones, who built the hotel in 1885.

Thomas Coburn converted the Langdon house into a hotel which opened on November 1, 1833. Frank Jones, a Portsmouth mayor, congressman, and prominent local brewer, bought it in 1870, tore it down, and built a Second Empire hotel building on the site. After a fire in 1884, Jones built the present structure. Through these constructions, the dining room of Woodbury Langdon, a high-quality rendition of domestic Georgian design, was retained.

A hotel until 1973, the premises, either as the home of Langdon or one of the two hotel structures, hosted presidents George Washington, Franklin Pierce, James K. Polk, Theodore Roosevelt, Chester A. Arthur, William H. Taft and John F. Kennedy.

Serving diners since the re-opening in 1887, the eastern entrance to the building opens onto a ladies' parlor to the left and a sitting room to the right. The elaborately decorated parlor, until recently referred to as the "Gold Room", has been converted to the bar that serves the nearby dining room. The latter, extending across the northeast rear of the building's main block, is now a commercial restaurant purchased by Adrienne and Paul Waterman in 2023, the Library Restaurant. This room is one of the most elaborately decorated in the building. The mahogany woodwork is finished in a Colonial Revival style, with pilasters that suggest those in the original Langdon dining room. Both the room's frieze and the mahogany-framed mantelpiece at the east end are ornamented with carved arabesques and festoons in a neo-Adamesque style that evokes the Federal period heritage of the hotel and the city of Portsmouth. The celling of the dining room is divided into geometric panels by a network of mahogany mouldings, and these panels are alternately filled with Lincrusta-Walton linoleum and with trompe l'oeil frescoes painted by John Gannon of Manchester, New Hampshire. Original Shreve, Crump & Low lighting lines the walls.

== Gallery ==
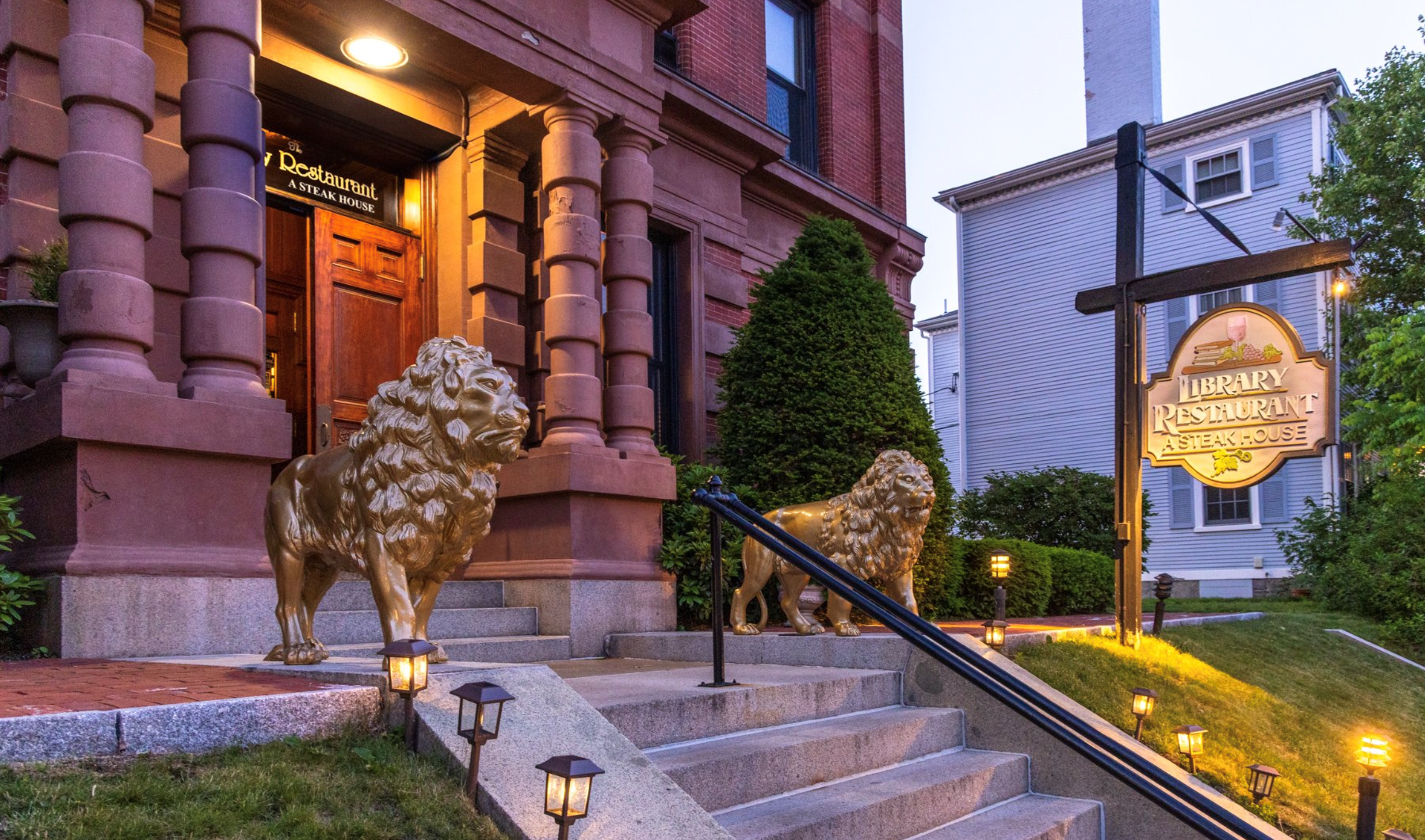
Two pairs of lions guard the two main entrances of the Rockingham Hotel and the Library Restaurant. Historically, one entrance was the ladies' entrance.

== See also ==
- National Register of Historic Places listings in Rockingham County, New Hampshire
