= Redford Union Schools =

School district in Michigan

Address
- 17715 Brady Redford, Wayne, Michigan, 48240; United States

District information
- Grades: Pre-Kindergarten-12
- Superintendent: Jasen Witt
- Schools: 8
- Budget: $65,355,000 2022-2023 expenditures
- NCES District ID: 2629460

Students and staff
- Students: 2,018 (2024-2025)
- Teachers: 147.05 (on an FTE basis) (2024-2025)
- Staff: 349.88 FTE (2024-2025)
- Student–teacher ratio: 13.72 (2024-2025)

Other information
- Website: www.redfordu.k12.mi.us

Redford Union Schools is a public school district in Metro Detroit. It serves parts of Redford Township, Michigan, which borders Detroit.

The district is also known as Redford Union District No. 1. South Redford School District is also located in Redford Township.

== History ==
=== Early history ===
The first school in the township was built in 1836 in an area of the township that was ultimately annexed by Detroit. The school was replaced by another school, made of red brick, in 1855. As was typical of that era, the school contained all primary grades in a single classroom, with separate genders using different entrances and keeping to their side of the room. It was considered a privilege for a student to collect drinking water from the well at a nearby farm, and lining up to take a drink from the bucket's single dipper was a known as "making the water."

By 1890, there were nine separate one-room school districts in the 36-square mile township, numbered 2-10. District 10 established a high school in 1915, known as Soleman Burt School, and it became an elementary school in 1921 when the first part of Redford High School (ultimately annexed to Detroit Public Schools) was built across the street.

=== No. 5 School ===
The township's District No. 5 School opened at 18499 Beech Daly Road in 1922. A two-classroom brick building, it housed grades 1 to 8 when first built. It was designed from stock plans provided by the Michigan Department of Education. Also known as Beech Road School, it continued to be used by the district for various purposes until the 1990s, when it became vacant. As part of the bond issue passed in 2021, the building was restored for use as a meeting space and history classroom.

=== 1923 to present ===
In 1923, six of the township's districts consolidated, including the district containing Redford High School. The newly consolidated district was called Rural Agricultural School District No. 2 of the Township of Wayne County, Michigan, a name that was changed to Redford Union District No. 1 later that year. Hoping to avoid annexation by Detroit, the district modeled its schools after those in Detroit, even hiring the same architecture firm, Wilhelm and Molby.

By 1926, there were 150 teachers working in the district, with 21 schools and over 5,000 students. When the City of Detroit annexed part of Redford Township that year, most of Redford's schools automatically transferred to Detroit's district. Now with no high school, voters in the Redford Union district voted to send its students to Detroit high schools, with the corresponding tuition.

William E. Lantz was hired as superintendent in September 1929, and he helped start a high school. Located in the Volney Smith School that had been built in 1925, it only went to grade ten. Although Mr. Lanz was asked to resign in 1930, the high school was successful and added grade eleven in 1931.

The district was devastated by the Great Depression, and cancelled kindergarten classes between 1931 and 1935. The district had recovered by the early 1940s, as enrollment had increased by over 1,000 students since 1926. With funding substantially from the Federal Government's Public Works Administration, a construction program was begun in 1942 that including a new high school.

A junior high school opened in fall 1954, and an addition was built in 1956. MacGowan Elementary was built in 1955. Several of the district's schools were designed by architect Earl G. Meyer. Pearson Junior High (today's Beech Elementary) opened in fall 1959. At that time, the high school was moved to the 1954 junior high school building, and the 1942 high school became the junior high.

As part of the construction bond issue passed in 2021, the 1942 junior high building became Hilbert Elementary, and the junior high was moved to the high school building. Stuckey and Beck Elementaries were closed.

== Schools ==
Schools in Redford Union Schools district
School	Address	Notes
Redford Union High School	26365 Curtis, Redford	Grades 10-12. Built 1954.
Redford Union Junior High School	17711 Kinloch, Redford	Grades 7-9. Built 1954.
Beech Elementary	19990 Beech Daly Road, Redford	Grades K-6. Built 1959.
Hilbert Elementary	26440 Puritan, Redford	Grades PreK-6. Built 1942.
Student Services/Special Education	18255 Kinloch, Redford	Located in former McGowan Elementary. Built 1955.
Keeler School	17715 Brady, Redford	Grades K-12. Day treatment programs.
Veritas Alternative Ed	18255 Kinloch, Redford	Alternative high school housed at former MacGown Elementary. Grades 6-12.
Redford Union Virtual Learning		Virtual school for grades 6-12.
