= Golden Hope =

Golden Hope Plantations Berhad
- Formerly: Harrisons & Crosfield
- Company type: Public limited company
- Industry: Plantation, Oils & Fats & Others
- Founded: 1905
- Defunct: 27 November 2007
- Successor: Sime Darby
- Headquarters: Menara PNB, Jalan Tun Razak, Kuala Lumpur, Malaysia
- Key people: Ahmad Sarji Abdul Hamid (Chairman)
- Website: www.goldenhope.com

Golden Hope Plantations Berhad (GHPB) was an estate and plantations company in Malaysia.

== History ==
In 1905 Harrisons and Crosfield, a British tea and coffee trading company purchased several small estates in Malaysia for £50,000 and amalgamated them to form the Golden Hope Rubber Estate.

In 1982 Harrisons and Crosfield sold three large plantation groups - Golden Hope, Pataling, and London Asiatic - to Malaysian concerns for £146 million.

The business was renamed GHPB in 1990 after Pemodalan Nasional Berhad took majority equity of the company. Its interests originally were in tropical agriculture but, while plantations have remained a core business interest, the company has diversified into other areas including glycerine manufacture, fruit juices and real estate. The group now has 83 subsidiaries based in seven countries. The main estate and plantations are Carey Island and Banting in Selangor.

In May 1990, Golden Hope signed a memorandum with the Malaysian Institute of Microelectronic Systems (MIMOS) for designing an industrial control system for the automation of palm oil mills; the system's project began in 1988. The control system was meant to be better than the existing ones which were forty years old.

In late November 2006, Synergy Drive Sdn Berhad, a special purpose entity with financing from CIMB Investment Bank Berhad, offered to acquire Golden Hope and seven others PLCs "to create the world's largest listed oil palm plantation" company. The merger, the largest to take place in Southeast Asia, was intended to consolidate over 6,000 km^{2} of plantation land.

In November 2007, shares of Golden Hope was de-listed, and the company merged with Sime Darby and Guthrie. The shares were then re-listed on the Bursa Malaysia on 29 November 2007 as Sime Darby. With the merger complete, Sime Darby was the largest company in Malaysia by market capitalisation.
