= Eric Wilson (linebacker, born 1994) =

American football player (born 1994)

No. 55 – Minnesota Vikings
- Position: Linebacker
- Roster status: Active

Personal information
- Born: September 26, 1994 (age 32); Redford, Michigan, U.S.
- Listed height: 6 ft 1 in (1.85 m)
- Listed weight: 231 lb (105 kg)

Career information
- High school: Lee M. Thurston (Redford)
- College: Northwestern (2012); Cincinnati (2013–2016)
- NFL draft: 2017: undrafted

Career history
- Minnesota Vikings (2017–2020); Philadelphia Eagles (2021); Houston Texans (2021); New Orleans Saints (2022)*; Green Bay Packers (2022–2024); Minnesota Vikings (2025–present)
- * Offseason or practice squad member only

Awards and highlights
- First-team All-AAC (2016); Second-team All-AAC (2015)

Career NFL statistics as of Week 10, 2026
- Total tackles: 572
- Sacks: 21.5
- Forced fumbles: 7
- Fumble recoveries: 3
- Pass deflections: 12
- Interceptions: 5
- Stats at Pro Football Reference

Eric André Wilson (born September 26, 1994) is an American professional football linebacker for the Minnesota Vikings of National Football League (NFL). He played college football for the Northwestern Wildcats and Cincinnati Bearcats, and signed with the Minnesota Vikings as an undrafted free agent in 2017. He has also played for the Philadelphia Eagles, Houston Texans, New Orleans Saints, and Green Bay Packers.

== Early life ==
Wilson played high school football at Lee M. Thurston High School in Redford, Michigan. He recorded 64 tackles and four sacks in his senior year. He played safety, linebacker, and wide receiver at Lee M. Thurston. He also earned All-State, All-Conference, All-Metro and Team MVP honors while at Lee M. Thurston. He lettered three years in football, four years in track and one year in basketball and was a long jump State Champion.

== College career ==
Wilson redshirted for the Northwestern Wildcats of Northwestern University in 2012. He transferred to the University of Cincinnati in 2013, where he played for the Cincinnati Bearcats from 2013 to 2016. He sat out the 2013 season due to NCAA transfer rules. He was named Second-team All-American Athletic Conference (AAC) in 2015 and First-team All-AAC in 2016. He played in 38 games, starting 24, during his college career. He graduated from Cincinnati in December 2016 with a degree in sports management.

== Professional career ==
=== Pre-draft ===
Wilson was rated the 21st best outside linebacker in the 2017 NFL draft by NFLDraftScout.com. The website also predicted that he would be selected in the seventh round. Lance Zierlein of NFL.com predicted that he would be drafted in the fifth or sixth round.

Pre-draft measurables
Height	Weight	Arm length	Hand span	Wingspan	40-yard dash	10-yard split	20-yard split	20-yard shuttle	Three-cone drill	Vertical jump	Broad jump	Bench press
6 ft 1 1/8 in (1.86 m)	230 lb (104 kg)	30 1/4 in (0.77 m)	9 1/2 in (0.24 m)	6 ft 1 in (1.85 m)	4.53 s	1.54 s	2.50 s	4.31 s	6.96 s	39.5 in (1.00 m)	10 ft 1 in (3.07 m)	25 reps
All values from Cincinnati Pro Day

=== Minnesota Vikings (first stint) ===
Wilson signed with the Minnesota Vikings as an undrafted free agent on May 1, 2017. Wilson made his first career sack in week 11 of the 2018 season against the Chicago Bears when he sacked quarterback Mitchell Trubisky in a 25–20 loss.

In week 3 of the 2019 season against the Oakland Raiders, Wilson recorded 2 sacks on Derek Carr in the 34–14 win. In week 17 against the Chicago Bears, Wilson recorded a team high 12 tackles and sacked Trubisky once during the 21–19 loss.

On March 16, 2020, the Vikings placed a second-round restricted free agent tender on Wilson. He signed the one-year contract on May 8, 2020. In Week 2 against the Indianapolis Colts, Wilson recorded his first career interception off a pass thrown by Philip Rivers during the 28–11 loss. In Week 5 against the Seattle Seahawks on Sunday Night Football, Wilson recorded a sack on Russell Wilson and intercepted a pass thrown by Wilson during the 27–26 loss. In Week 8 against the Green Bay Packers, Wilson recovered a fumble forced by teammate D. J. Wonnum on Aaron Rodgers late in the fourth quarter to secure a 28–22 Vikings' win.

=== Philadelphia Eagles ===
Wilson signed a one-year contract with the Philadelphia Eagles on April 14, 2021. He was named the starting middle linebacker alongside T. J. Edwards. He started two of seven games played before being released on November 3.

=== Houston Texans ===
On November 4, 2021, Wilson was claimed off waivers by the Houston Texans.

=== New Orleans Saints ===
On May 16, 2022, Wilson signed with the New Orleans Saints. He was released on August 30, and re-signed to the practice squad the next day.

=== Green Bay Packers ===
On October 4, 2022, Wilson was signed by the Packers off of the Saints' practice squad. On October 16, he blocked a punt by Braden Mann during a Week 6 loss to the New York Jets. On March 25, 2023, Wilson re-signed with the Packers. On January 20, Eric recovered a fumble against the San Francisco 49ers, during the second round of the NFL playoffs.

On March 23, 2024, Wilson re-signed with the Packers. In Week 3 against the Indianapolis Colts, Wilson recorded a near perfect Pro Football Focus grade of 99.4 as the Packers won 16–10, after recording a forced fumble, a tackle for loss and an interception over 8 defensive snaps.

=== Minnesota Vikings (second stint) ===
On March 14, 2025, Wilson signed with the Minnesota Vikings.

On March 9, 2026, Wilson re-signed with the Vikings on a three-year, $22.5 million contract.

In week 10 of the 2026 NFL season against the Green Bay Packers, Wilson recorded one sack over Jordan Love and finished the game with seven total tackles in the 30–10 win.

== NFL career statistics ==
Legend
**Bold**	Career high

=== Regular season ===
Year	Team	Games		Tackles						Interceptions						Fumbles			
Year	Team	GP	GS	Comb	Solo	Ast	Sck	TFL	Sfty	PD	Int	Yds	Avg	Lng	TD	FF	FR	Yds	TD
2017	MIN	16	0	8	5	3	0.0	0	0	0	0	0	0.0	0	0	1	0	0	0
2018	MIN	16	4	42	31	11	2.0	4	0	0	0	0	0.0	0	0	0	0	0	0
2019	MIN	16	6	62	36	26	3.0	6	0	0	0	0	0.0	0	0	0	1	0	0
2020	MIN	16	15	**122**	**62**	**60**	3.0	8	0	**8**	**3**	**23**	**7.7**	**16**	0	1	**2**	**7**	0
2021	PHI	7	2	43	18	25	0.0	1	0	1	1	7	7.0	7	0	0	0	0	0
2021	HOU	7	0	3	2	1	0.0	0	0	0	0	0	0.0	0	0	0	0	0	0
2022	GB	13	0	17	9	8	1.0	1	0	0	0	0	0.0	0	0	0	0	0	0
2023	GB	17	0	31	16	15	0.0	0	0	0	0	0	0.0	0	0	0	0	0	0
2024	GB	17	12	72	38	34	2.0	7	0	2	1	0	0.0	0	0	1	0	0	0
2025	MIN	17	16	115	60	55	**6.5**	**17**	0	0	0	0	0.0	0	0	**4**	0	0	0
Career		142	55	515	277	238	17.5	44	0	11	5	30	6.0	16	0	7	3	7	0

=== Postseason ===
Year	Team	Games		Tackles						Interceptions						Fumbles			
Year	Team	GP	GS	Comb	Solo	Ast	Sck	TFL	Sfty	PD	Int	Yds	Avg	Lng	TD	FF	FR	Yds	TD
2017	MIN	2	0	1	0	1	0.0	0	0	0	0	0	0.0	0	0	0	0	0	0
2019	MIN	2	2	**13**	**9**	**4**	0.0	0	0	0	0	0	0.0	0	0	0	0	0	0
2023	GB	2	0	6	5	1	0.0	0	0	0	0	0	0.0	0	0	0	**1**	0	0
2024	GB	1	0	1	0	1	0.0	0	0	0	0	0	0.0	0	0	0	0	0	0
Career		7	2	21	14	7	0.0	0	0	0	0	0	0.0	0	0	0	1	0	0
