= Paul Waterman =

American businessman (born 1964)

Lynn Paul Waterman
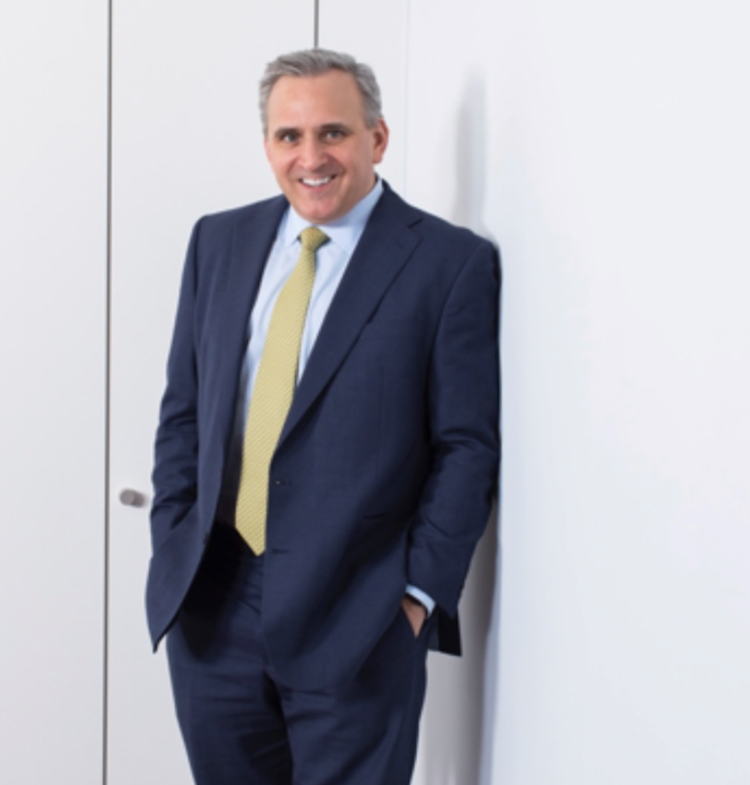
- Born: July 24, 1964 (age 62); America
- Occupations: Businessman, ceo
- Known for: CEO Elementis, CEO BP Castrol, CEO BP Australasia

Lynn Paul Waterman, usually known as Paul Waterman (born July 24, 1964), is an American businessman and the chief executive officer of Elementis Plc. Waterman was Global CEO of BP Lubricants,. He joined Castrol in 1994 eventually becoming CEO of BP Lubricants Americas in 2007 and later moving to CEO of BP Global Aviation, Industrial Marine & Energy Lubricant businesses. From there he took on the role of chief executive of BP Australasia & Country President, BP Australia and from 2012 spent his final years in BP as CEO of BP Lubricants. Waterman has a BSc degree in packaging engineering from Michigan State University and an MBA from Stern School of Business.

== Early life and education ==
Waterman was born in Redford Township, Michigan, to parents Lynn Paul II and Linda Crider. In 1982, he graduated from Redford Union High School. He received a Bachelor of Science in packaging engineering from Michigan State University in 1987. During his time at MSU, he was a member of the fraternity Delta Chi. In 1995 Waterman was awarded an MBA in finance/international business from Stern School of Business, New York University.

== Early career ==
Waterman began his career in consumer marketing in 1987, holding brand management roles at Reckitt Benckiser and Kraft Foods.

Waterman joined Castrol in 1994, taking on marketing, retail and vice president roles. He latterly integrated into BP after it acquired Burmah-Castrol in 2000.

In 2005 Waterman became the incident crisis manager after the BP Texas City refinery explosion. Waterman coordinated BP response to the industrial accident which killed 15 employees and injured 170 others.

In 2006, he returned to the BP Lubricants Americas as U.S. general manager, and in May 2007 was promoted to chief executive for BP Lubricants Americas., assuming full responsibility for the company's lubricants business across North and South America. He subsequently took up the role of CEO Castrol Global Aviation, Marine, Industrial & Energy Lubricants.

== BP Australasia ==
In 2010 Waterman relocated to Melbourne, Australia, to take up roles as chief executive BP Australasia and country president, BP Australia In addition to his BP role, Waterman was appointed chairman of the Australian Institute of Petroleum in 2012

During his time in Australia, Waterman became a speaker in the industry on the rising cost of doing business in Australia

Australia is becoming an increasingly expensive place to do business, resulting in almost every investment decision being a close call, a leading oil executive has warned. BP Australasia president Paul Waterman said the cost of doing business would have to go down or Australia would lose out.

In 2011 whilst in his role as CEO, there were market rumors that Waterman was being targeted by Australia's second-largest oil and gas producer, Woodside, for the role of CEO

== Later BP career: Castrol ==
In July 2012 Waterman was appointed global chief executive of BP Lubricants and led the company through a period of growth.

During his tenure as CEO, Waterman fronted a new joint venture with TechSolve, a specialized US-based manufacturing consultancy. The new entity, OPTIS, develops technology and services to enable manufacturers of machined parts to improve efficiency in their operations and across the supply chain.

Two years later Waterman announced his resignation from BP to take up the position of group chief executive of Elementis Plc, a constituent of the FTSE 250 Index. It was announced on the London Stock Exchange.

== Later career: Elementis Plc ==
Following his years at BP, Waterman took up the role of group CEO and president of Elementis Plc, a UK based chemicals production company. Waterman has led the company through a period of share growth – taking the share from £2.11 at his start date to crossing the £3 mark for the first time since June 2015 on February 10, 2017.

Within the first year of his leadership of the chemicals company, in a bid to grow the company's personal care and cosmetics business, Waterman acquired SummitReheis, an antiperspirant ingredient supplier for US$360 million. SummitReheis manufactures and distributes antiperspirant chemicals for deodorants and dental products, a $13bn industry

Chief executive officer Paul Waterman said: The group is well positioned to capitalize on this acquisition through the enhanced geographic footprint and strong customer relationships that it brings. Together with our existing business, the acquisition of SummitReheis is transformative for our personal care business, creating a substantial, high-return platform that will help accelerate our Growth strategy.

The deal was received positively by the capital markets "Market Cheers US Acquisition By Elementis" and was reported by the cosmetics industry.

On February 27, 2018 Elementis reported operating profit up 32% and revenues up 26%, taking the share price up by 43% under Watermans tenure. CNBC report Elementis up 26%

On October 23, 2018 Elementis acquired Mondo Minerals from U.S. private equity firm Advent International for an enterprise value of $500 million, funded by a rights issue. Mondo Minerals makes industrial talc additives used to strengthen plastics, provide corrosion resistance to coatings, an oxygen barrier to food packaging and UV protection to cosmetics.

During 2020 and 2021 Elementis rejected three offers from U.S. rival Minerals Technologies (MTX), and a £929.3 million cash and stock offer from U.S. chemicals firm Innospec (IOSP). It dismissed the approaches as significantly undervaluing the company.

== Personal life ==
Waterman lives in Portsmouth, New Hampshire, and is married to Adrienne and has two children: Elyse and Andrew John.

== Investments and philanthropy ==
Waterman co-founded the NotForgotten Digital Preservation library in 2018 and is an owner of the Philip Herd Nature Reserve – a 12,000 Ha nature reserve within the UNESCO Vhembe Biosphere Reserve in the Limpopo Province, South Africa. The reserve is a protected area and is classified as an area of critical biodiversity.

In 2023 Waterman acquired ownership of the Library Restaurant – in the historic Rockingham Hotel and The Fisherman's Catch in Wells, Maine.
