= NotForgotten Digital Preservation Library =

Coordinates: 40.35166°N 74.66165°W

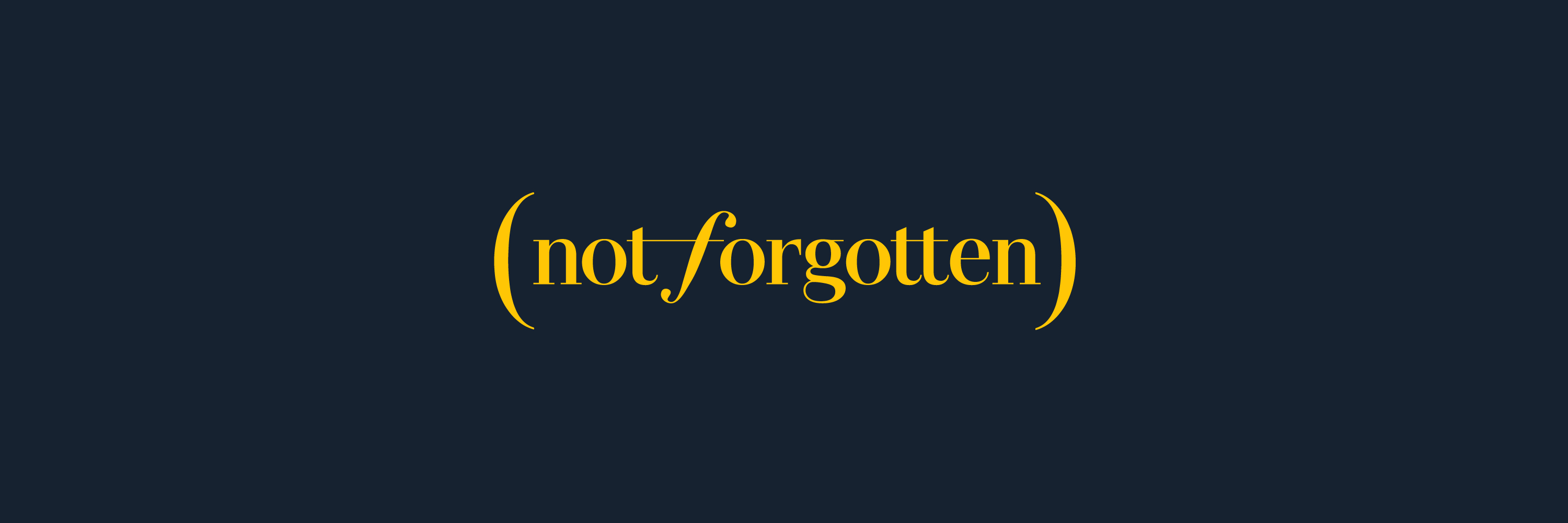
The logo

Not Forgotten Digital Preservation Library LLC (OCLC library symbol IEFDP), based in Princeton, NJ, United States, is an organization established to create, record and preserve legacies and time capsules. The library registers and maps all types of time capsule projects worldwide, and catalogs them on the WorldCat.

== Operations ==
Not Forgotten makes legacy products and preserves and catalogs them for future generations. Legacies are linked to a person's genealogy records, recorded on the blockchain, and in library records.

The International Time Capsule Society holdings are cataloged as part of the NotForgotten Library Depository holdings and each will be released on an Advance Directive for each Time Capsule The registry of Time Capsules contains the records of all Time Capsules buried then registered with the NotForgotten library by members of the public and corporate institutions. Many records are private and will be released on the "Advance Directive" date. The registry will be maintained by the library until the year 2319.

NotForgotten Digital Preservation Library LLC, is a holding company founded by Adrienne and Paul Waterman and the company is based in Princeton, New Jersey, USA. Two subsidiaries operate beneath the holding company – a library entity (the NotForgotten Library Depository), and the operational company (NotForgotten Operations LLC).

In January 2020 NotForgotten was awarded a BIG innovation award in recognition of organizations, products and people that are bringing new ideas to life in innovative ways.

The Not Forgotten Time Capsules are recorded on a smart contract on the Ethereum Blockchain Smart with the objective of creating a discoverable, trackable record of its Time Capsules on the Ethereum blockchain.

The Not Forgotten Time Capsules are referenced by a unique GEDCOM record linking four generations of a family to each Time Capsule.

== Library and digital preservation trust ==
The NotForgotten Library Depository is designated as an archive and special library by OCLC. The library preserves the time capsules and also maintains a general global registry and map of all Time Capsules buried anywhere (The International Time Capsule Catalog) - tracking the world's time capsules to ensure that those that are created are not lost.

The library is overseen by an advisory board responsible for the administration of the library's continuing obligations for hundreds of years – caring for and making decisions concerning the Time Capsules and the infrastructure which supports them. It is funded through the NotForgotten Guarantee Trust Fund.

=== Special collections administration ===
In addition to the registry of Time Capsules, the library also houses the Time Capsules Special Collection, which includes holdings of digital time capsules licensed to the library by their creators. The library as trustee of the assets oversees all aspects of the Time Capsule holdings.

=== The NotForgotten guarantee trust fund ===
The primary purpose of the Trust is to protect the funding of the Library; to provide financial support to the Library and to be able to support the records and time capsules held by the Library by investing the funds.

== Privacy ==
The Depository is designated both as a special library and an archive with OCLC (library symbol IEFDP), sharing its "library of human experience" and holdings information with the public and employing a library management system that facilitates global sharing. Time capsules registered on the International Time Capsule Register have public library records of their capsule which are made accessible through the public OCLC library catalog.

The information which is captured inside of and in association with the archive and library records will by definition be public and not private. "Advance directives” are used to enable privacy for a period, but to make the Time Capsules and Time Capsule Register all ultimately public. The records by necessity have the characteristics of the individual archiver. After the Public Availability Date the public may also obtain copies of the record in question through the library.
