= South Redford School District =

School district in Michigan, U.S.

Address
- 26141 Schoolcraft Redford, Wayne County, Michigan, 48239; United States

District information
- Type: Public
- Grades: PreKindergarten-12
- Superintendent: Jason Bobrovetski
- Schools: 7
- Budget: $71,966,000 (2022-2023 expeditures)
- NCES District ID: 2632280

Students and staff
- Students: 2,775 (2024-2025)
- Teachers: 177.16 FTE (2024-2025)
- Staff: 441.97 FTE (2024-2025)
- Student–teacher ratio: 15.66 (2024-2025)

Other information
- Website: www.southredford.org

South Redford School District is a public school district in Metro Detroit. It serves the southern part of Redford.

== History ==
South Redford School District is derived from Redford Township District No. 9, formed in the nineteenth century. The many small, rural school districts in the township consolidated in the 1920s until there were two districts: Redford Union Schools in the northern section and South Redford School District in the southern. Beech School was South Redford's single school until George Hall Fisher Elementary School opened in fall 1928.

Lee M. Thurston High School was completed in fall 1954. Ten schools were built between 1946 and 1963, but several have closed due to declining enrollment.

Voters passed a bond issue in 2005 to add an auditorium and auxiliary gymnasium to the high school and make other repairs and improvements throughout the district. A nearly $80 million bond issue passed in 2021 to fund further improvements.

== Schools ==
Schools in South Redford School District
School	Grades	Address	Built
George H. Fisher Elementary School	K–5	10000 Crosley, Redford, MI 48239	1928
Arthur H. Vandenberg Elementary School	K–5	24901 Cathedral, Redford, MI 48239	1956
Jane Addams Elementary School	K–5	14025 Berwyn, Redford, MI 48239	1963
Thomas Jefferson Elementary School	K–5	26555 Westfield, Redford, MI 48239	1958
John D. Pierce Middle School	6–8	25605 Orangelawn, Redford, MI 48239	1959
Lee M. Thurston High School	9–12	26255 Schoolcraft, Redford, MI 48239	1954
SOAR Academic Institute	Alternative secondary school. Grades 6–12	26141 Schoolcraft, Redford, MI 48239	
