= Elementis =

British company

Elementis plc
- Company type: Public
- Traded as: LSE: ELM; FTSE 250 component
- Industry: Chemicals
- Founded: 1844; 182 years ago
- Headquarters: London, UK
- Key people: Andrew Duff, Chairman; Paul Waterman Group Chief Executive
- Revenue: ▼$597.5 million (2025)
- Operating income: ▲$109.0 million (2025)
- Net income: ▲$(45.5) million (2025)
- Number of employees: 1,000 (2026)
- Website: www.elementis.com

Elementis plc is one of the UK's largest speciality chemicals and personal care businesses, with extensive operations in the United States, Europe and Asia. It is listed on the London Stock Exchange and is a constituent of the FTSE 250 Index.

Its predecessor business, Harrisons & Crosfield, was formed in 1844 as a tea merchant and traded under that name for 150 years. It became one of the leading British firms in the south and the south-east Asia plantations industry before it gradually divested its interests in the post-colonial era. Diversification initially concentrated on chemicals, timber and builders’ merchants and animal foodstuffs. Eventually, the firm concentrated only on chemicals and changed its name to Elementis.

== Early history ==
The Harrisons & Crosfield partnership was formed in 1844 between Daniel and Smith Harrison and Joseph Crosfield to trade in tea and coffee, which was to be the core of the business until the end of the nineteenth century. Daniel, born in 1795, was the senior having been trading in Liverpool since the 1820s. His brother Smith Harrison was 23 years younger while Joseph Crosfield had previously been an employee of Daniel. 80% of the business was in tea, imported from China, and 20% coffee from South America. The firm moved to London in 1854 and by the 1860s it was the third largest tea trader. Control passed to the next generation in the second half of the century, with two Harrison and three Crosfield partners.

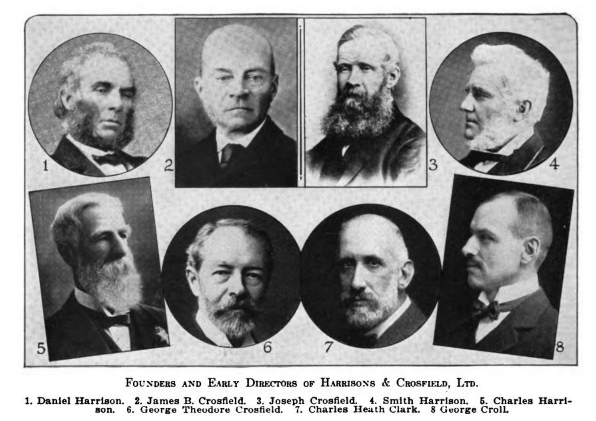
Harrisons & Crossfield Founders and Early Directors

== Enter Lampard and Clark ==
Until the 1890s, Harrisons & Crosfield was just a respected London merchant. By then the two men who were to revolutionize the business had joined: Arthur Lampard in 1881 and Heath Clark in 1885. The first change was that rather than just merchanting, the firm began blending its own tea under the brand “Nectar” and a large export business was developed from Ceylon Wharf on the South Bank. (The Nectar brand was later sold to Twinings). Clark handled the domestic market while Lampard opened offices around the world to handle the export business and to develop local trade. Lampard visited Russia in 1895 to establish a tea trade there and immediately sailed for Ceylon to organize the export of tea to what would prove to be its largest market. He then opened a branch in Columbo under the name of Crosfield Lampard setting Harrisons & Crosfield on the path to what would be its dominant activity for nearly a century: tropical plantations of tea, followed by rubber, timber and palm oil.

== Plantation agencies ==
Harrison & Crosfield was one of a number of British firms that controlled plantations across south-east Asia through the agency system. The development of a plantation required committing substantial capital for a period of years before the first crops matured. Typically, the agency would provide all the administration, technical, financial and commercial expertise but the capital would be raised externally. Frequently, the capital came from a London Stock Exchange flotation, with the agency acting as secretary. The agency might subscribe for only a few per cent of the capital but it exercised effective control. An indication of the profusion of these quoted plantation companies is that, to take a year at random, there were 79 of them in 1935.

Harrisons & Crosfield handled too many agencies to detail separately. The first venture was the purchase of the small Hopton tea estate in Ceylon; Hopton in turn was one of four estates consolidated into the Lunuva Tea Company in 1907. In India, a Calcutta branch was opened in 1900 promoting the export of tea to North America. Extensive purchases of land were made in southern India leading to the formation of the East India Tea and Produce Company, the Malayalam Rubber and Produce Company and the Meppadi Wynaad Tea Company.

The turn of the century saw the development of the rubber plantation, natural rubber previously being tapped in the wild in South America. The Straits Plantations Ltd (operating in the then Straits Settlements) transferred to the Harrisons & Crosfield agency in 1902 but later companies were formed by Harrisons to buy smaller estates and group them into larger company structures. The Pataling Rubber Estates Syndicate was formed in 1903; Golden Hope Rubber Estate and Anglo-Malay Rubber in 1905; and London Asiatic Rubber and Produce in 1907. In that same year Lampard visited Sumatra and repeated the consolidation process that had taken place in Malaya. Tandjong Rubber Company and United Serdang (Sumatra) Rubber Plantations were both formed and floated. In 1909 holdings in many of the tea and rubber companies were transferred to the Rubber Plantations Investment Trust which was also floated.

== Harrisons becomes a company ==
In the midst of all its company flotations, Harrisons & Crosfield had its own reorganization. Retirement and withdrawal of capital by partners was a constraint and the expansion of Harrisons trading required more capital. In 1908 the partnership was converted to a company and was floated on the Stock Exchange. However, the public issue was confined to preference shares; the ordinary shares remained with the partners and senior employees. The Company continues to this day as Elementis (Holdings).

== Inter-war years ==
The inter-war years were difficult for the plantation companies, yet Harrisons managed to secure new areas for growth. Arthur Lampard died in 1916 and Heath Clark retired in 1924 but new people were ready to cope with the challenges and opportunities. One in particular was Eric Macfadyen who had been active in rubber estates before the War. He joined Harrisons & Crosfield in 1918 to become the leading force for 40 years; with H. J. Welch and Eric Miller, the three men ran the Group during the inter-war years. The challenges were similar to those of any international trading company. There was a sharp recession in 1921 and the rubber price fell from 2s-1d in 1919 to 9d in 1922 For tea, the loss of the Russian market in 1917 caused a collapse in Ceylon tea exports. There was a recognition that Harrisons had over expanded before the War. In 1921 it acted as agents for as many as 52 plantation companies in Malaya, Sumatra, Ceylon, southern India, Java and Borneo; a period of consolidation followed. The 1930 recession proved even more severe and the rubber estates lost money in the tree years 1930 to 1932.

Despite the difficult trading conditions, opportunities were pursued, taking the Group into timber, palm oil and chemicals. One of the strategic purchases took place at the end of the War when Harrisons bought Darby & Co, a trading business in North Borneo with a blue-chip list of international agencies. Walter Darby, the founder, was a man whose local prominence earned him a place on the local stamps. Darby was also chairman of the China Borneo Timber Company and instrumental in founding the British Borneo Timber Company (later Sabah Timber) in 1920 with Harrisons owning a third of the shares. Harrisons was now in the timber business and British Borneo was given a monopoly on timber production for not less than 25 years.

The second new plantation activity was palm oil. In 1926 Harrisons bought Rambong Sialing estate in Sumatra followed by several more small estates, then the formation of Allied Sumatra Plantations in 1926. The purchase of some large estates in 1928 meant that palm oil became a major activity for Harrisons.

In a move which took Harrisons further into industrial processes, Wilkinson Process Rubber was formed in 1926 to develop the process patented in 1923 by Bernard Wilkinson. The low temperature vulcanization process allowed the fresh liquid rubber to be compounded on the spot and it was marketed under the name of Linatex. A factory was built in Selangor, partly owned by Harrisons, which also acted as Secretary and sole European agent. From the late 1920s the provision of industrial supplies to the plantations widened the agency business and in particular took Harrisons into chemicals in North America. There were a series of acquisitions in the late 1930s culminating in the purchase of the Dillons Chemical Company of Canada in 1938.

The traditional estates were not neglected and a significant purchase was made in 1925 - the Prang Besar rubber estate near Kuala Lumpur. This estate led the research into improved planting and breeding and its techniques were applied to other Harrisons estates.

== Decolonization and challenges ==
The challenges were partly economic as natural rubber faced increasing competition from synthetics. However, the greatest challenges came from the post-war decolonization and the gradual desire of the newly independent countries to control their own raw materials. This was exacerbated by insurgency in both Malaysia and Indonesia. Despite this, and the earlier determination not to be too reliant on one region, Harrisons continued to find opportunities for growth in south east Asia.

One of the undoubted successes was North Borneo Timber, later Sabah Timber. Despite losing its monopoly in 1950, improved mechanical logging took timber production from around 2m cubic feet to 19m in 1969. By the time that logging ended in 1982, Sabah had established a thriving timber business in the U.K. Another growth market developed after the war was oil palms, often planted on old rubber estates but Harrisons also acquired virgin land in Sabah and formed a new venture in Papua New Guinea, New Britain Palm Oil. In India, Harrisons had 32 estates, mainly tea but some rubber, by 1960. From then there were further acquisitions but a focus on amalgamations created the larger entity of Malayalam Plantations.

Despite the disruption caused by the Malayan Emergency, Harrisons' agency companies continued to acquire additional estates. As with India, there was a consolidation of estates into what became known as "the three sisters": Golden Hope, Pataling and London Asiatic. After a fierce takeover battle with outsiders, these three companies were merged in 1977 into Harrisons Malaysian Estates. In Indonesia, Harrisons struggled with changing nationalist demands, losing control of its agencies at times. Around 1960 the London Sumatra Group was established to merge its 16 agency companies; others were added and it became one of the world's largest plantation companies. By 1983 Harrisons had acquired complete control.

Harrisons gradually faced increased demands from its host governments, variously in the form of higher royalties, increased taxation, and a desire to see greater local ownership. The plantations in Sri Lanka were the first to go, being nationalized in 1975. In 1982, the local entity Harrisons Malaysian Plantations Berhad was formed to acquire HME; Harrisons retained 30% and received £130m cash. After some poor plantation results, and pressure from outside shareholders, Harrisons decided to reduce further its dependence on plantations by divesting its minority holdings in Harrisons Malayalam and Harrisons Malaysian Plantations Berhad but retaining London Sumatra Plantations and Papua New Guinea. In 1983, 34% of Malayalam Plantations were sold to Indian nationals, leaving Harrisons with 40%. At the same time Malayalam Plantations merged with Harrison & Crossfield's other interests to form Harrisons Malayalam. London Sumatra was sold in 1994 and the Papua New Guinea company followed in 1996.

== Diversification ==
The post-war diversification started with chemicals and went on to include timber and builders’ merchants; and malting and animal foodstuffs to make a three-pronged industrial company. Eventually, the latter two prongs were sold leaving the specialty chemicals company that is now Elementis.

The corporate building block that became the chemical division was Durham Chemicals and in 1947 Harrisons formed a joint venture with Durham in Canada to build a zinc oxide manufacturing facility. Zinc oxide has extensive uses but an important one was in the vulcanization of rubber, which was the initial attraction for Harrisons. Another joint company was Durham Raw Materials, which was to be the sole selling agency for Durham products, including the Neoprene agency in the UK Although the Canadian venture failed, the relationship with Durham developed and by 1962 Harrisons had acquired a majority holding; the business was then concentrating on zinc salts and metal soaps. In 1973, Albright & Wilson's chrome business was bought and renamed British Chrome & Chemicals and substantial investment was made in the production of chromic oxide. A complementary business was bought in the US in 1979 and renamed American Chrome & Chemicals, making Durham a world leader in chrome and iron oxide pigments. In the early 1980s Durham Chemicals built a plant for aluminum chloride and by 1984 had over 60% of the UK market.

The timber and building materials division was a natural extension of Sabah Timber's business downstream into the UK. In 1969 Sabah had been told that its logging concession would lapse in 1982. From then on Sabah Timber began a series of small acquisitions of timber merchants in the UK. The third arm of the diversification came in 1985 with the purchase of Pauls, a leading producer of malting and animal feedstuffs. That was augmented by the acquisition of Associated British Maltsters for £14m in 1987.

== Three-pronged expansion ==
By 1986, chemicals and industrials became the biggest earner for the first time. The stated strategy was to concentrate on the three main areas – chemicals, timber and building supplies and food & agriculture alongside the retained plantations. This strategy was pursued vigorously until 1994, described as “a year of change”.

In chemicals, £34m was spent on buying Pfizer's iron oxide business in 1990. Durham was now the second-largest iron oxide pigment business in the world; the UK leader for zinc oxide and only producer of aluminum chloride. British and American Chrome were world leaders in chromium chemicals. Durham Chemicals also had a substantial market position in polymer additives and the original Linatex remained an important specialty.

The timber and builders’ merchants division, now trading under the Harcros name, was substantially increased by the purchases of Wodburys timber business in the US in 1988, followed in the UK by Southern-Evans for £85m in 1988 and Crossley Builders Merchants for £113m in 1990. This gave 255 Harcros branches in the UK and 315 worldwide. Pauls was expanded in 1992 with the £67m acquisition of Unilever's animal food business, British Oil and Cake Mills, creating BOCM Pauls.

== Elementis – a chemicals company ==
1994 was deemed a year of change. The sale of London Sumatra, the builders’ supplies business in Ireland and the consumer foods business raised £282m. Although the intention then was for investment to concentrate on chemicals and timber & building supplies while retaining malting, the non-chemicals businesses did not remain for long. In 1997 the timber and foods divisions were sold for £458m and £400m was returned to shareholders. The remaining food business were sold a year later. The Harrisons & Crosfield name was changed to Elementis and the policy was to concentrate on specialty chemicals.

The purchase of American Rheox in 1998 for $465m was one of the largest chemical acquisitions. Elementis now stood as the world's largest producer of chromium chemicals; Elementis Pigments the world's second largest producer of synthetic iron oxide pigments and the Rheox business was the world's largest producer of rheological additives for coatings. Chromium was further enlarged with the acquisition of the chromium chemicals business of OxyChem in the US in 2002, making it the country's largest producer. This was followed by the construction of a chromium plant in China in 2004. In that same year, Elementis acquired the Dutch Sasol Servo, a supplier of coatings additives, for €48m. One negative was the unprofitability of the UK chromium business and the plant was controversially closed in 2009. Further small acquisitions to enlarge the coatings business were made in 2012 and 2013: Watercryl Quimica Ltda of Brazil provided an entry to Latin America and in the U.S., Hi-Mar was a leading supplier of defoamers to the coatings, construction and oilfield drilling industries.

Increased specialization led to the disposal of the specialty rubber, international pigments and the surfactants businesses. A further change in emphasis to the Elementis business came with the move into personal care with the acquisition of Fancor, one of North America's largest lanolin and lanolin derivatives suppliers. This was a prelude to a more substantial acquisition when in 2017 Elementis nearly trebled its personal care business with the purchase of SummitReheis for $362m; based in the US and Germany it specialized in anti-perspirant additives. This was followed in 2018 by the creation of a new division by the $600m acquisition of Mondo Minerals, described as the “second largest producer of premium talc based additives in the world”. Following this acquisition, the group's main divisions were then described as personal care; coatings; talc; chromium; and energy.

During 2020 and 2021 Elementis rejected three offers from U.S. rival Minerals Technologies (MTX), and a £929.3 million cash and stock offer from U.S. chemicals firm Innospec (IOSP). It dismissed the approaches as significantly undervaluing the company.

In 2022 the Chromium business was sold to the Yildirim Group.

== Operations ==
The business is organised into two divisions: Performance Specialties and Personal Care.

== See also ==
- Eric Miller
- Golden Hope
- Paul Waterman
