= Lee M. Thurston High School =

High school in Michigan, United States

Location
- 26255 Schoolcraft; Redford, Wayne, Michigan 48239; United States
- Coordinates: 42.384094°N 83.30235°W

Information
- School type: Public
- School district: South Redford School District
- NCES District ID: 2632280
- CEEB code: 230955
- NCES School ID: 263228006762
- Teaching staff: 51.98 (FTE)
- Grades: 9-12
- Enrollment: 867 (2023-2024)
- Student to teacher ratio: 16.68
- Language: English
- Colors: Navy and white
- Team name: Eagles
- Website: thurston.southredford.org

Student assessments
- 2021–22 school year Change vs. prior year

M-STEP 11th grade proficiency rates (Science / Social Studies)
- Advanced %: 7.5 / ≤5
- Proficient %: 17.1 / –
- PR. Proficient %: 12.6 / 60.1
- Not Proficient %: 62.8 / 23.2

Average test scores
- SAT Total: 850.1 (▼ −29.1)

Lee M. Thurston High School is a public high school in Redford, Michigan, United States in the suburban Detroit area. The school is a part of the South Redford School District.

The school was completed in 1956. Recently THS received the rank of 11th among Michigan schools in Newsweek's top 1,000 high schools list. Thirty percent of Thurston High School receives subsidized lunch.

== Notable alumni ==
- Eric Wilson, American football player
- Jim "JJ" Johnson, Detroit radio personality
- Paul Glantz, Emagine Entertainment founder
