= Redford, Michigan =

Charter township in Michigan, United States

Redford Township, Michigan
- Charter township
- Charter Township of Redford
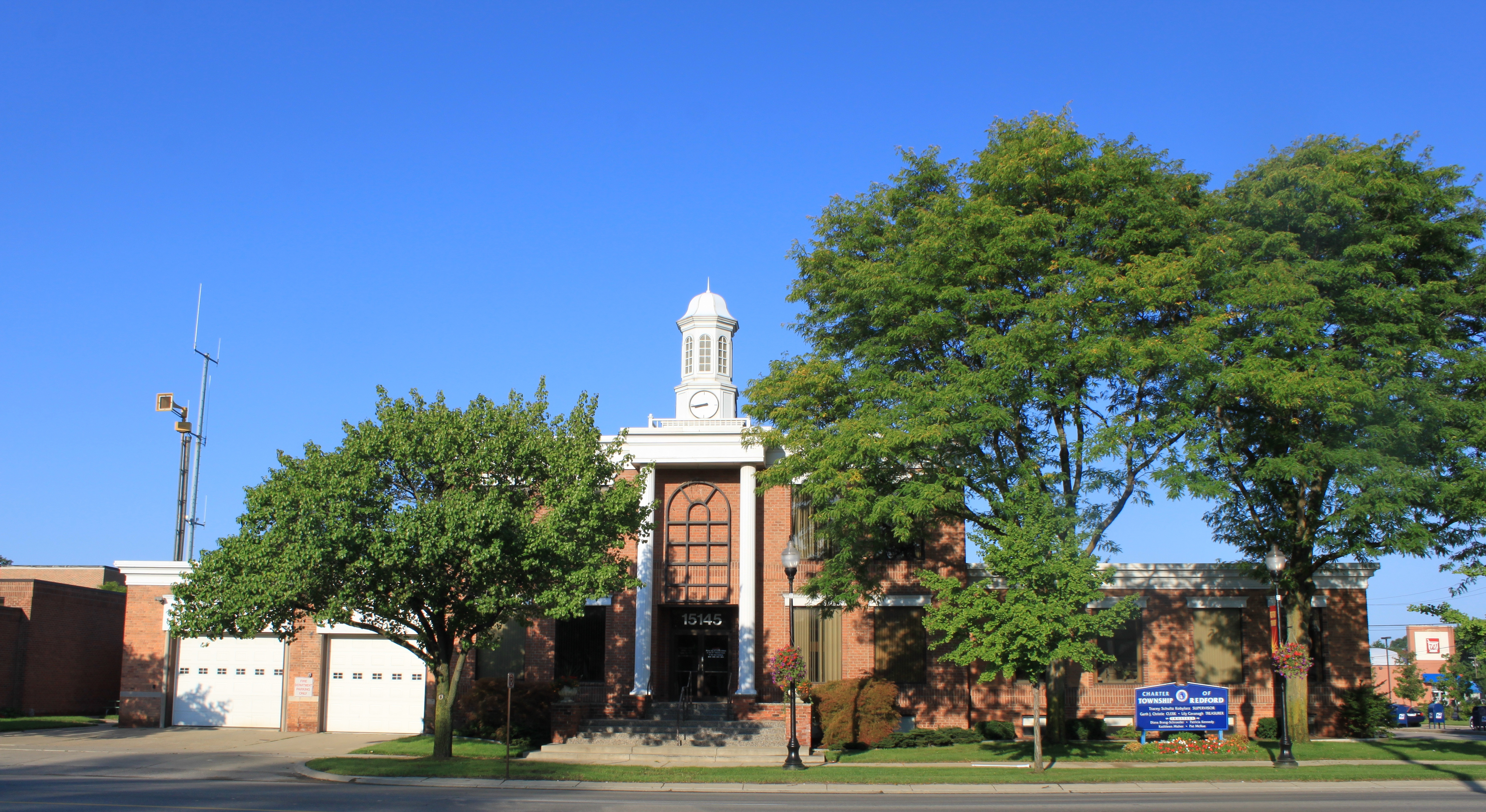
- Redford Township Hall

- Flag Seal

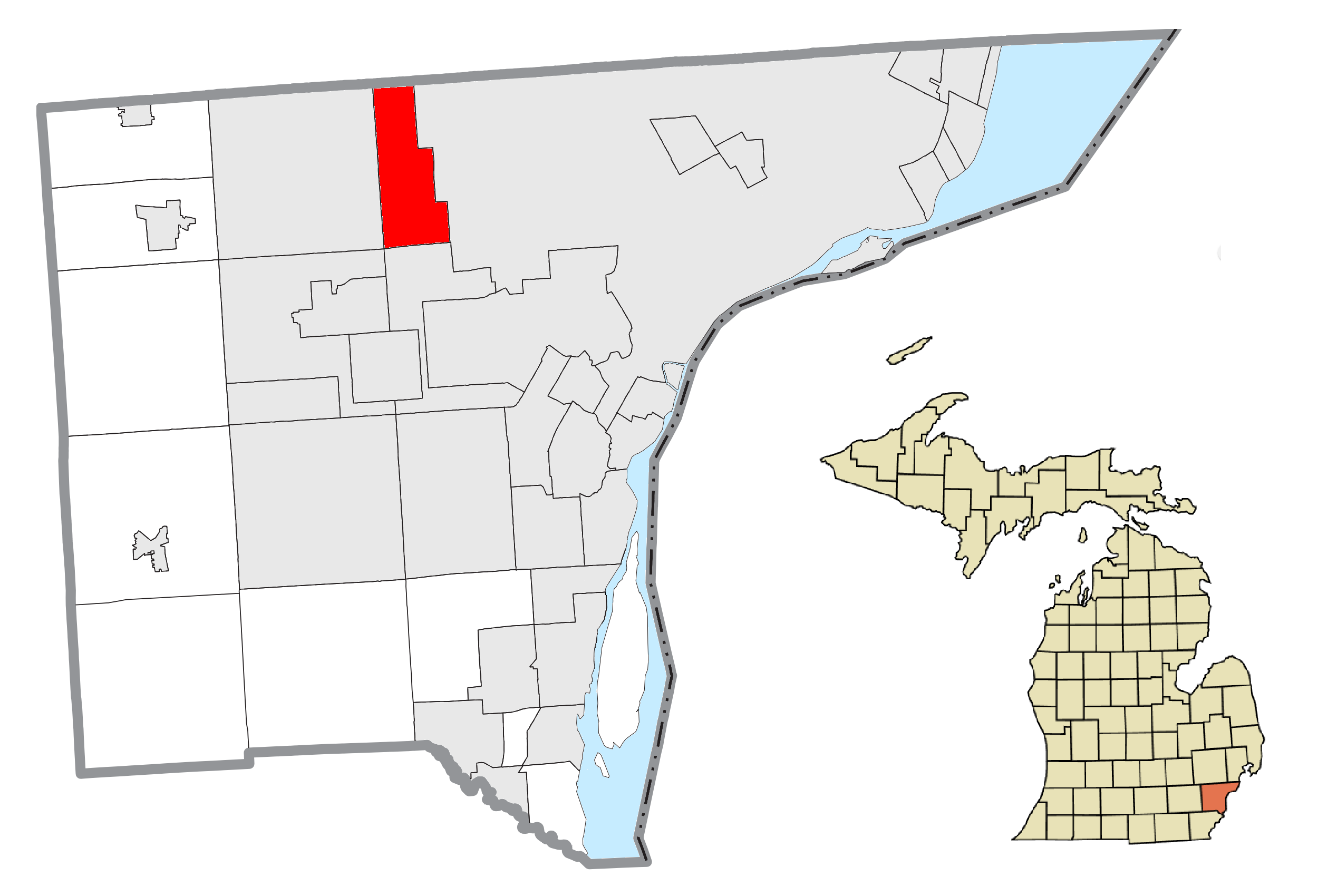
- Location within Wayne County

- Location within the state of Michigan Location within the United States
- Coordinates: 42°23′41″N 83°17′49″W
- Country: United States
- State: Michigan
- County: Wayne
- Organized: 1829

Government
  - Supervisor: Pat McRae
  - Clerk: Garth Christie

Area
  - Charter township: 11.24 sq mi (29.11 km^{2})
  - Land: 11.24 sq mi (29.11 km^{2})
  - Water: 0 sq mi (0.0 km^{2})
- Elevation: 627 ft (191 m)

Population (2020)
  - Charter township: 49,504
  - Density: 4,302.7/sq mi (1,661.3/km^{2})
  - Metro: 4,285,832 (Metro Detroit)
- Time zone: UTC−5 (Eastern (EST))
  - Summer (DST): UTC−4 (EDT)
- ZIP codes: 48239, 48240
- Area code: 313
- FIPS code: 26-67625
- GNIS feature ID: 1626960
- Website: Official website

Redford Township (commonly known simply as Redford) is a charter township in Wayne County in the U.S. state of Michigan. An inner-ring suburb of Detroit, Redford borders Detroit to the west, roughly 15 miles (24.1 km) northwest of downtown Detroit. As of the 2020 census, the township had a population of 49,504.

== History ==
Springwells Township and Bucklin Township were formally organized and laid out by gubernatorial act on April 12, 1827. Postal regulations prohibiting two post offices having the same name required—when a township was subdivided—unique names to be found. The Bucklin name was extinguished when it was split on October 29, 1829, along what is now Inkster Road into Nankin Township (west half) and Pekin Township (east half), named as a result of a wave of interest in China. In March 1833, Pekin was renamed Redford and the southern half became Dearborn Township on April 1. The name Redford was chosen because natives and colonial European immigrants forded the River Rouge where the river runs through Redford. "Rouge" is French for "red."

Beech (42°22′40″N 83°17′44″W) was an unincorporated community given a post office on December 4, 1871, with Albert Fisher serving as the first postmaster. Beech was platted in 1872 and was also known by the name Fisher. It had a general store operated by Albert Fisher and a sawmill operated by Dunning, Fisher & Rhode. It was also known as Fishers Station after the railroad depot. The post office was absorbed into Detroit and closed on September 17, 1906. Today, the community of Beech is part of Redford Township, and the name is retained locally in Beech Daly Road.

The township used to go all the way to Greenfield Road, but in the 1920s the eastern portions of the township were annexed by Detroit. This annexation ceased in 1926 when the township was given "charter" status by the Michigan legislature. In 1918, a post office named "Five Points" operated between 6 Mile Road and 7 Mile Road along Five Points Road.

Redford is the site of Hosanna-Tabor Evangelical Lutheran Church and School, whose hiring practices spurred the 2012 Supreme Court Case Hosanna-Tabor Evangelical Lutheran Church and School v. Equal Employment Opportunity Commission.

== Geography ==
Redford Township is a western, inner ring suburb of Detroit. According to the United States Census Bureau, the township has a total area of 11.2 square miles (29 km^{2}), all land. The middle branch of the River Rouge flows through the Lola Valley Park in the township. Ashcroft Creek, another branch of the Rouge River, flows for about a half mile in the southeastern corner of the township before entering Detroit's Rouge Park, and then into the main branch of the Rouge. Tarabusi Creek of the Bell Branch, another branch of the Rouge River, flows through Western Golf Club and Bell Creek Park.

== Demographics ==
Historical population
Census	Pop.	Note	%±
1930	3,834		—
1940	6,867		79.1%
1950	18,940		175.8%
1960	71,276		276.3%
1970	71,901		0.9%
1980	58,441		−18.7%
1990	54,387		−6.9%
2000	51,662		−5.0%
2010	48,362		−6.4%
2020	49,504		2.4%

=== Racial and ethnic composition ===
Redford Charter Township, Michigan – Racial and ethnic composition Note: the US Census treats Hispanic/Latino as an ethnic category. This table excludes Latinos from the racial categories and assigns them to a separate category. Hispanics/Latinos may be of any race.
Race / Ethnicity (NH = Non-Hispanic)	Pop 2000	Pop 2010	Pop 2020	% 2000	% 2010	% 2020
White alone (NH)	44,731	31,292	21,167	86.65%	64.70%	42.76%
Black or African American alone (NH)	4,383	13,891	23,163	8.49%	28.72%	46.79%
Native American or Alaska Native alone (NH)	211	206	131	0.41%	0.43%	0.26%
Asian alone (NH)	385	399	422	0.75%	0.83%	0.85%
Native Hawaiian or Pacific Islander alone (NH)	9	5	13	0.02%	0.01%	0.03%
Other race alone (NH)	66	56	258	0.13%	0.12%	0.52%
Mixed race or Multiracial (NH)	793	1,093	2,472	1.54%	2.26%	4.99%
Hispanic or Latino (any race)	1,044	1,420	1,878	2.02%	2.94%	3.79%
Total	51,622	48,362	49,504	100.00%	100.00%	100.00%

=== 2020 census ===
In 2020, Redford Township had a population of 48,492. The ethnic and racial makeup of the population was 44.1% white, 50.2% African-American, 0.4% Asian, 3.0% reporting more than one race, 5.5% Hispanic. White alone (i.e. non-Hispanic) reporting residents accounted for 41.5% of the population.

=== 2010 census ===
In 2010, Redford Township had a population of 48,362. The ethnic and racial makeup of the population was 64.7% white, 28.7% African-American, 0.8% Asian, 2.3% reporting more than one race, 0.6% reporting other races (apparently including those who reported being Native American and being Pacific Islander as well as those who just marked the other box) and 2.9% Hispanic or Latino of any race. The African-American population increased by about 200% between 2000 and 2010, while the overall population of the township declined by 6%.

=== Population trends ===
The U.S. Census Bureau also defined Redford Township as a census-designated place (CDP) in the 2000 Census so that the community would appear on the list of places (like cities and villages) as well on the list of county subdivisions (like other townships). The final statistics for the township and the CDP were identical.

=== 2000 census ===
As of the 2000 census, there were 51,622 people, 20,182 households, and 13,582 families living in the township. The population density was 4,597.4 inhabitants per square mile (1,775.1/km^{2}). There were 20,605 housing units at an average density of 1,835.1 per square mile (708.5/km^{2}). The racial makeup of the township was 87.98% White, 8.54% African American, 0.43% Native American, 0.76% Asian, 0.02% Pacific Islander, 0.57% from other races, and 1.70% from two or more races. Hispanic or Latino of any race were 2.02% of the population.

There were 20,182 households, out of which 31.8% had children under the age of 18 living with them, 50.4% were married couples living together, 12.1% had a female householder with no husband present, and 32.7% were non-families. 27.3% of all households were made up of individuals, and 11.6% had someone living alone who was 65 years of age or older. The average household size was 2.54 and the average family size was 3.12.

In the township the population was spread out, with 25.3% under the age of 18, 7.0% from 18 to 24, 34.0% from 25 to 44, 18.7% from 45 to 64, and 14.9% who were 65 years of age or older. The median age was 36 years. For every 100 females, there were 96.1 males. For every 100 females age 18 and over, there were 92.9 males.

The median income for a household in the township was $49,522, and the median income for a family was $56,461. Males had a median income of $41,923 versus $29,987 for females. The per capita income for the township was $22,263. About 3.2% of families and 5.1% of the population were below the poverty line, including 6.0% of those under age 18 and 5.2% of those age 65 or over.

As of the census of 2010, there were 48,362 people, 19,148 households, and 12,387 families living in the township. The population density was 4,597.4 inhabitants per square mile (1,775.1/km^{2}). There were 20,739 housing units at an average density of 1,835.1 per square mile (708.5/km^{2}). The racial makeup of the township was 66.4% White, 28.9% African American, 0.5% Native American, 0.8% Asian, 0.02% Pacific Islander, 0.8% from other races, and 2.5% from two or more races. Hispanic or Latino of any race were 2.9% of the population.

== Education ==
=== Schools ===
The public schools are operated by the Redford Union School District, South Redford School District and Clarenceville School District.

Public high schools include:

- Redford Union High School
- Thurston High School

The Roman Catholic Archdiocese of Detroit used to operate Bishop Borgess High School and Academy (closed in 2005) and Detroit Catholic Central High School (relocated to Novi, Michigan in 2005) in Redford Township.

=== Public library ===
Redford Township Library is located on West Six Mile Road. The library service began in the 1920s, with a bookmobile providing service to the citizens of Redford Township. By the 1950s, the library operated out of a small store front on Beech-Daly Rd. about a block south of Fenkel. A larger, newly constructed and more modern Redford Township District Library operated from 1962 until August 23, 2004, when the library moved again to another newly constructed, even larger, technologically updated building. In a $4.5 million project, the old library building was turned into an open-air market, amphitheater (the Redford Marquee) and public green space. The Redford Marquee opened in July 2008. The construction of the new library was facilitated by an $8.5 million community bond. The 65,000-square-foot (6,000 m^{2}) facility is situated on a 2.6 acres (11,000 m^{2}) site that is being leased for $1 for 99 years. The library's collection consists of 100,000 books and periodicals, 2,500 CDs, records, cassettes and other audio materials, in addition to 2,500 video items.

== Highways ==
- I-96
- US 24 (Telegraph Road)
- M-5 (West Grand River Avenue)
- M-102 (Eight Mile Road)

== Notable people ==
Redford is the birthplace of musician Ted Nugent (December 13, 1948), arena football player Stephen Wasil (April 14, 1984), NFL player Eric Wilson (September 26, 1994), and Paul Waterman, businessman and CEO (July 24, 1964).

== In popular culture ==
- Folk musician and songwriter Sufjan Stevens' song "Redford (For Yia-Yia & Pappou)," which appeared on his 2003 album Michigan, mutely chronicles Stevens' childhood experiences in Redford Township, where his grandparents lived.

== Sister cities ==
Redford has two sister cities, as designated by Sister Cities International:

- St. Johann in Tirol, Austria
- Gau-Algesheim, Rhineland-Palatinate, Germany

== Additional sources ==
- Romig, Walter (October 1, 1986) [1973]. Michigan Place Names: The History of the Founding and the Naming of More Than Five Thousand Past and Present Michigan Communities (Paperback). Great Lakes Books Series. Detroit, Michigan: Wayne State University Press. ISBN 978-0-8143-1838-6.
