= Minnesota State Capitol artwork =

History and usage of artwork at the state capitol

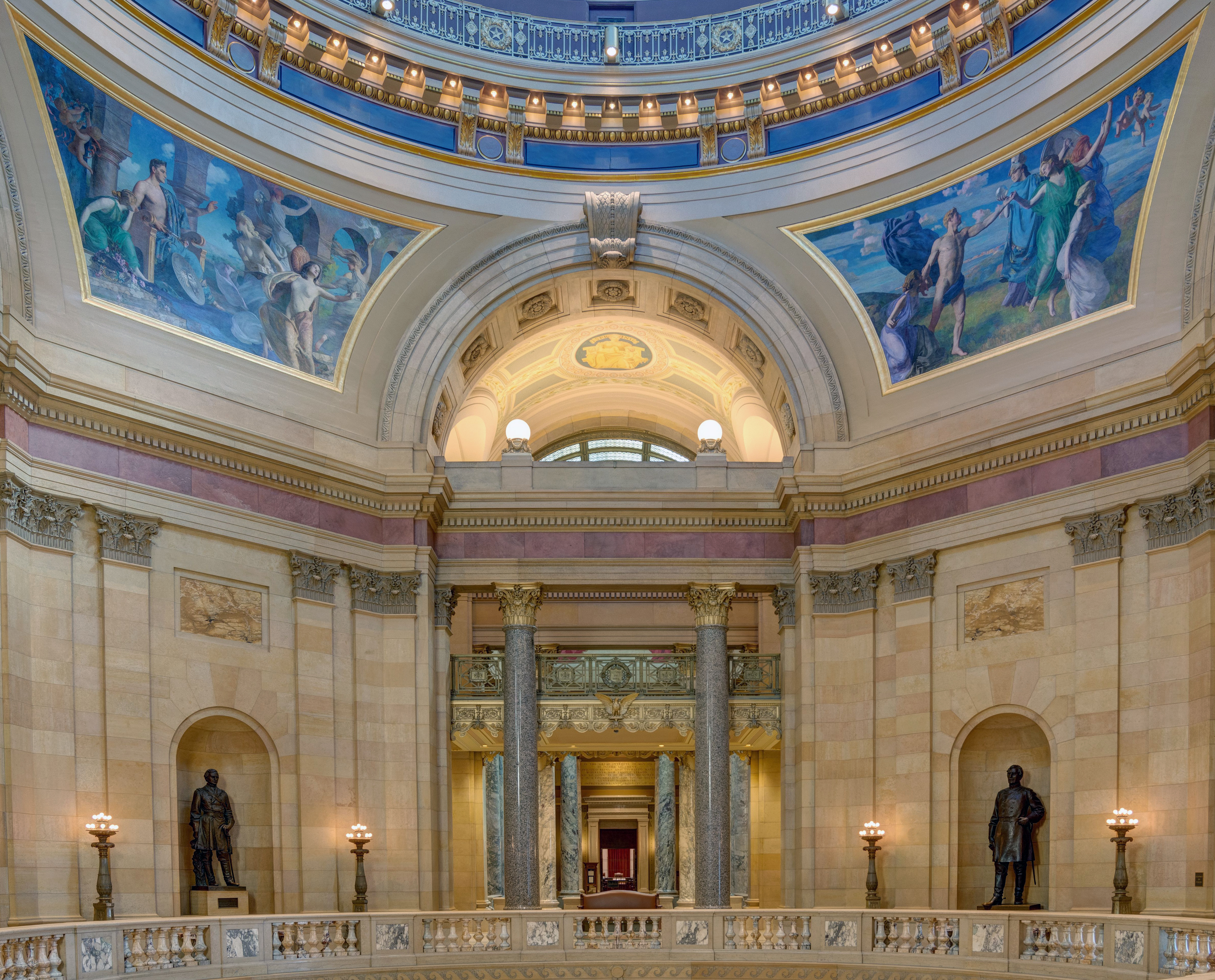
Artwork in the Minnesota Capitol rotunda

The Minnesota State Capitol opened in 1905 with roughly 60 artworks that totaled $300,000, or 7% of the $4.5-million project budget. Cass Gilbert, the architect of the Capitol building, had envisioned that the artworks would add "educational value" and provide for the "advancement of civilization and intelligence." Over the years, more artworks would be added to the Capitol, totaling nearly 150 by 2017. Much of the Capitol art is allegorical, as expressed through murals and sculptures, while some feature key moments in Minnesota history. While the allegorical symbolism used in the paintings would have been more widely understood during the time they were painted, over time the meanings have been challenged.

The Capitol rotunda, and each of the three chambers contain important murals expressed in allegorical symbolism created by Edward Emerson Simmons, Kenyon Cox, Edwin Howland Blashfield, Henry Oliver Walker, John La Farge. The four Supreme Court Chamber murals were painted by La Farge to illustrate four key moments in the history of law. The Minnesota House Chamber features a sculpture by Carlo Brioschi called the Minnesota Spirit of Government which features Sacagawea, and French explorers. The Minnesota Senate Chamber contains two murals by Edwin Blashfield; Minnesota: Granary of the World shows Minnesota as a leader in agriculture, Civil War contributions and the transition to mechanization. The second mural, Discoverers and Civilizers Led to the Source of the Mississippi depicts Native Americans and the spirit of Manitou at the headwaters of Mississippi surrounded by "discoverers" and "civilizers" who are guided from above by angelic beings signifying divine manifest destiny. Decorating the interior of the dome, Elmer Garnsey and his assistant Arthur Willett created the twelve zodiac lunettes as well as lunettes on either side of the east and west grand staircases. Arguably the most familiar allegorical work at the Capitol is gilded sculpture group, The Progress of the State sculpted by Daniel Chester French and Edward Clark Potter seated above the main south entrance of the Capitol.

Multiple groups, notably American Civil War veterans and the Minnesota Historical Society along with politicians demanded that the artwork in the Capitol illustrate historic events of Minnesota's past and this resulted in the addition of six large paintings on Minnesota history in the Governor's Reception Room by artists Douglas Volk, Francis D. Millet, Howard Pyle, and Rufus Fairchild Zogbaum. In alcoves on the second floor of the Capitol, rotunda stand the larger-than-life statues of American Civil War heroes John B. Sanborn, Alexander Wilkin, William Colvill, and James Shields by sculptors John Karl Daniels, Catherine Backus, and Frederick Cleveland Hibbard. These works have been criticized by former Governor Mark Dayton, stating they should be replaced with new artwork that broadens the representation of Minnesota.

In 1971 the Minnesota Historical Society along with the Capitol Area Architectural Planning Board (CAAPB) were given control of all works of art and they created a "Policy for Works of Art in the Minnesota State Capitol" to define the process, procedures and guidelines for new art. From 2013 to 2017 the building underwent a $310 million extensive restoration. This included comprehensive cleaning and restoration of historic paintings, murals, and sculptures as well as decorative elements around and outside the building. During the renovation, numerous paintings were criticized for their portrayals of Native Americans and were either moved to locations where expanded interpretation could be given or were removed from the building entirely.

== History ==
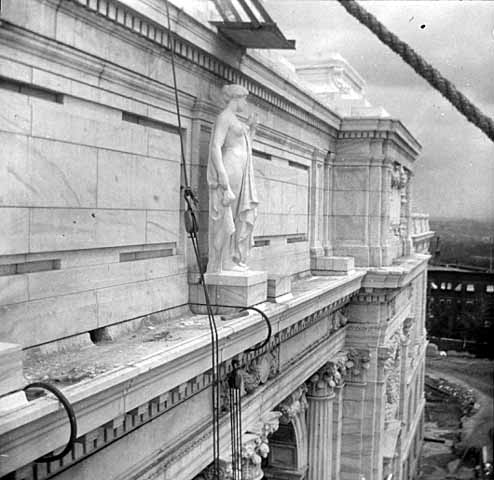
Virtue statues being put into place on the State Capitol, 1901

In the planning of the Capitol building from 1896 to 1905, its architect Cass Gilbert had envisioned marble and bronze statuary on the exterior and numerous artworks in the interior. Gilbert sought out many of the finest artists of the period, such as Kenyon Cox, Elmer Garnsey, Edwin Howland Blashfield, Henry Oliver Walker, Edward Emerson Simmons, John La Farge, Douglas Volk, Francis D. Millet, Howard Pyle, and Rufus Fairchild Zogbaum.

In the 1901 architect report, Gilbert noted his vision for the art:

Nothing will give the building greater distinction or lend more to its educational value and to the evidence of the advancement of civilization and intelligence of the State than the recognition of the arts as represented by the great painters and sculptors of the present day, and I unhesitatingly and strongly recommend that ample provision be made to decorate the building with mural painting and sculpture...

Much of the art planned for the Capitol was allegorical, as expressed through murals. As work continued after 1900 on the interior multiple groups, American Civil War veterans and the Minnesota Historical Society, along with politicians, demanded that the artwork in the Capitol illustrate historic events of Minnesota's past. In regards to The Progress of the State, one critic of the time encouraged Minnesotans to, "Take a sledge hammer and smash them Roman bronchos and that chariot! Clean 'em out and put a grand heroic statue of Alexander Ramsey in their stead!" The current ornate look of the Governor's Reception Room was partly a response to Minnesotans' suggestions for pictures from their own history which gave Gilbert the opportunity to upscale his plans for the room and to include six large paintings that span 200 years of the area's history. Gilbert advised the Board on the series of Civil War paintings for the Governor's Reception Room and expressed his disapproved of the four Civil War Alcove monuments on the second floor rotunda.

When the State Capitol opened in 1905 it had roughly 60 artworks that totaled $300,000, or 7% of the $4.5-million project budget. Additional art has been added inside the premises. In 1944, the custom of displaying governor portraits in the public corridors was initiated. Over the years artworks added to the Capitol total nearly 150 by 2017. In 1971, the Capitol Area Architectural Planning Board and the Minnesota Historical Society were entrusted to approve design, structural composition and location of all works of art.

=== 2013–2017 renovation ===
The Minnesota State Capitol underwent a comprehensive restoration project from 2013 to 2017, the first major renovation since the building first opened. The project also included a restoration of the capitol's many works of fine art. This was the first time the murals in the Capitol had comprehensive restoration plan. Before that any restoration work done to the murals was the result of an emergency circumstance or was done by workers often with brush and a pail of water to scrub off the grime accumulated on the murals from smoke, coal dust and other impurities approximately every two decades. Because the delicate murals are secured to their locations nearly all were restored in place. Conservation included extracting grime, old yellowed varnish, and any overpainting done in past restorations using solvents when they could but also applying a variety of small tools. Some murals needed removal from the walls due to the extent of damage and conservation work needed to the mural and/or the wall behind it. Specifically, five of dome's zodiac lunettes and the fourth panel in the Simmons's Civilization of the Northwest mural series in the rotunda required the challenging task of being removed from the walls to conservation labs.

During the renovations, numerous paintings depicting Native Americans were removed or moved to new locations where expanded interpretation could be done.

Conservation of artwork at the Capitol

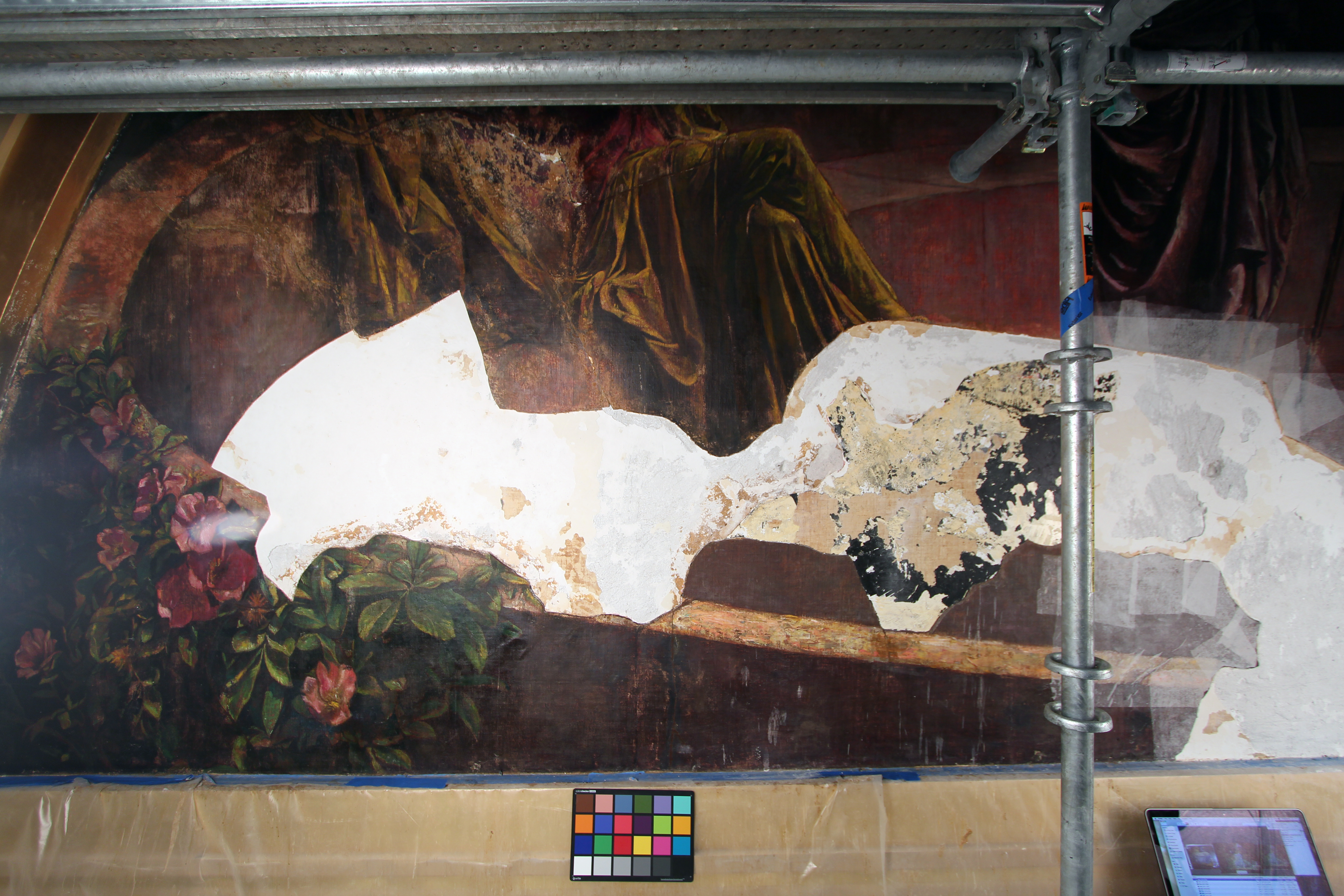
Conservation and repair of mural, The Relation of the Individual to the State

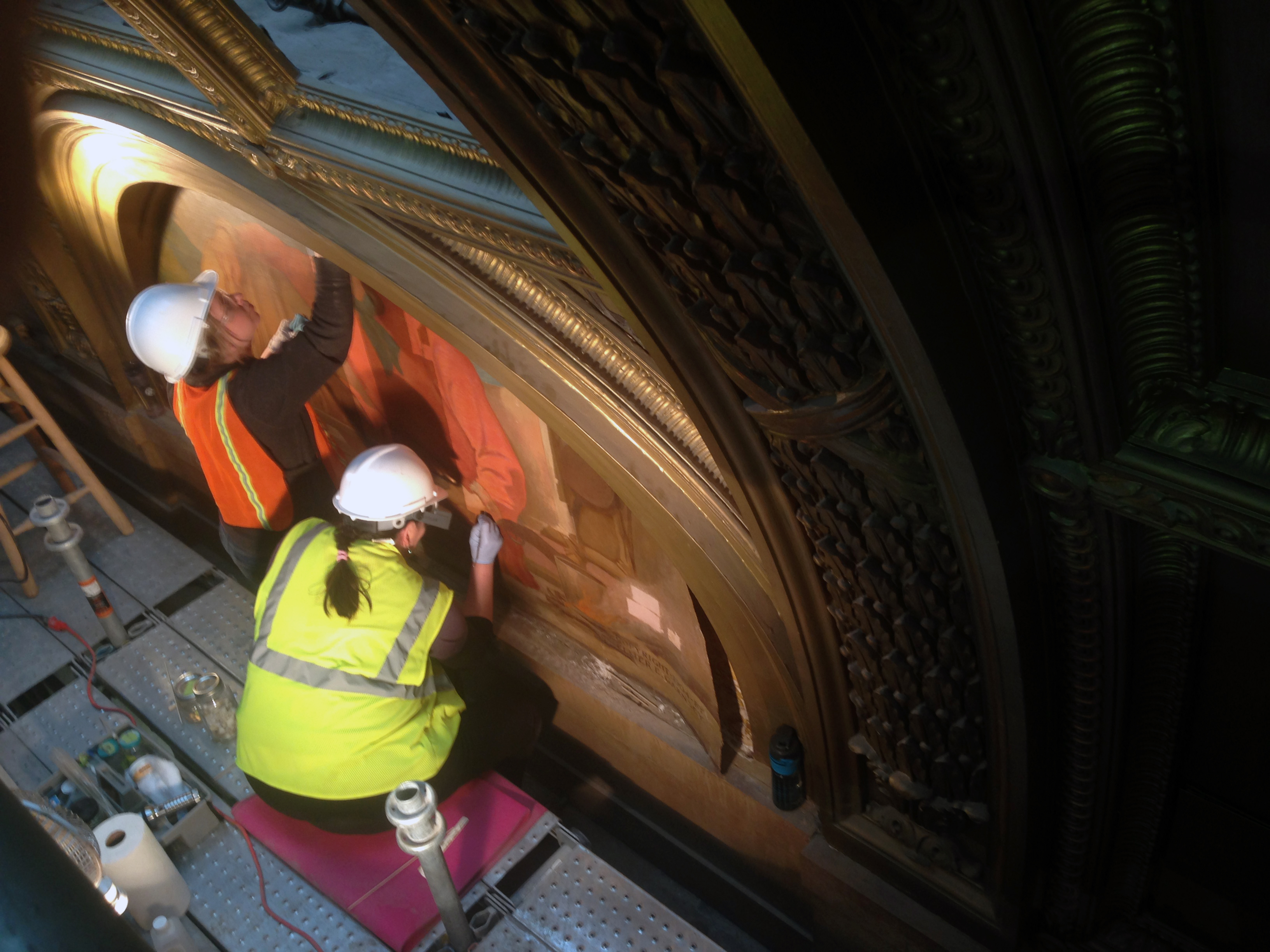
Restoration/conservation work being done on the lunette

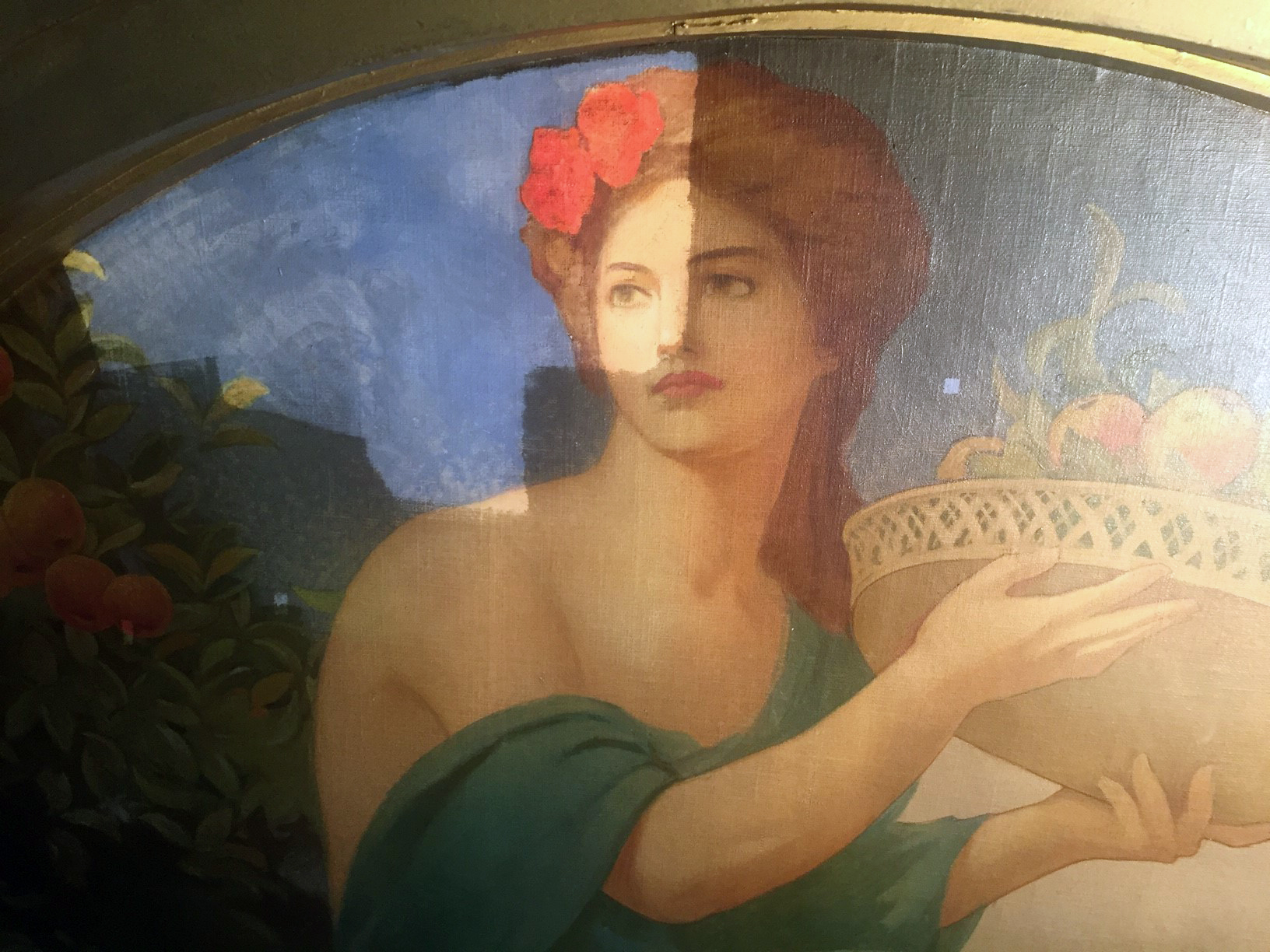
Conservation of the horticulture lunette

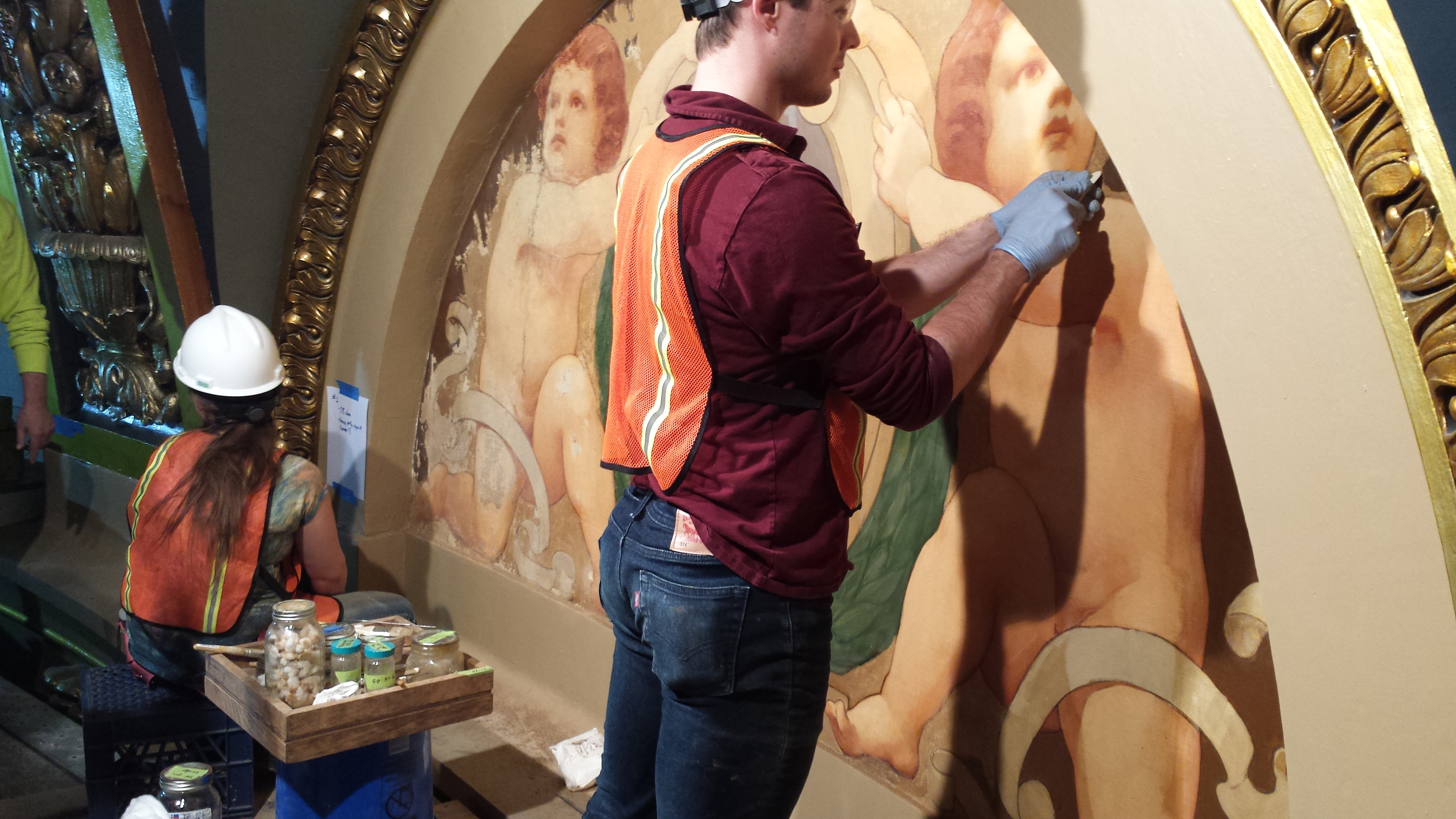
Conservation of mural, Zodiac: Taurus

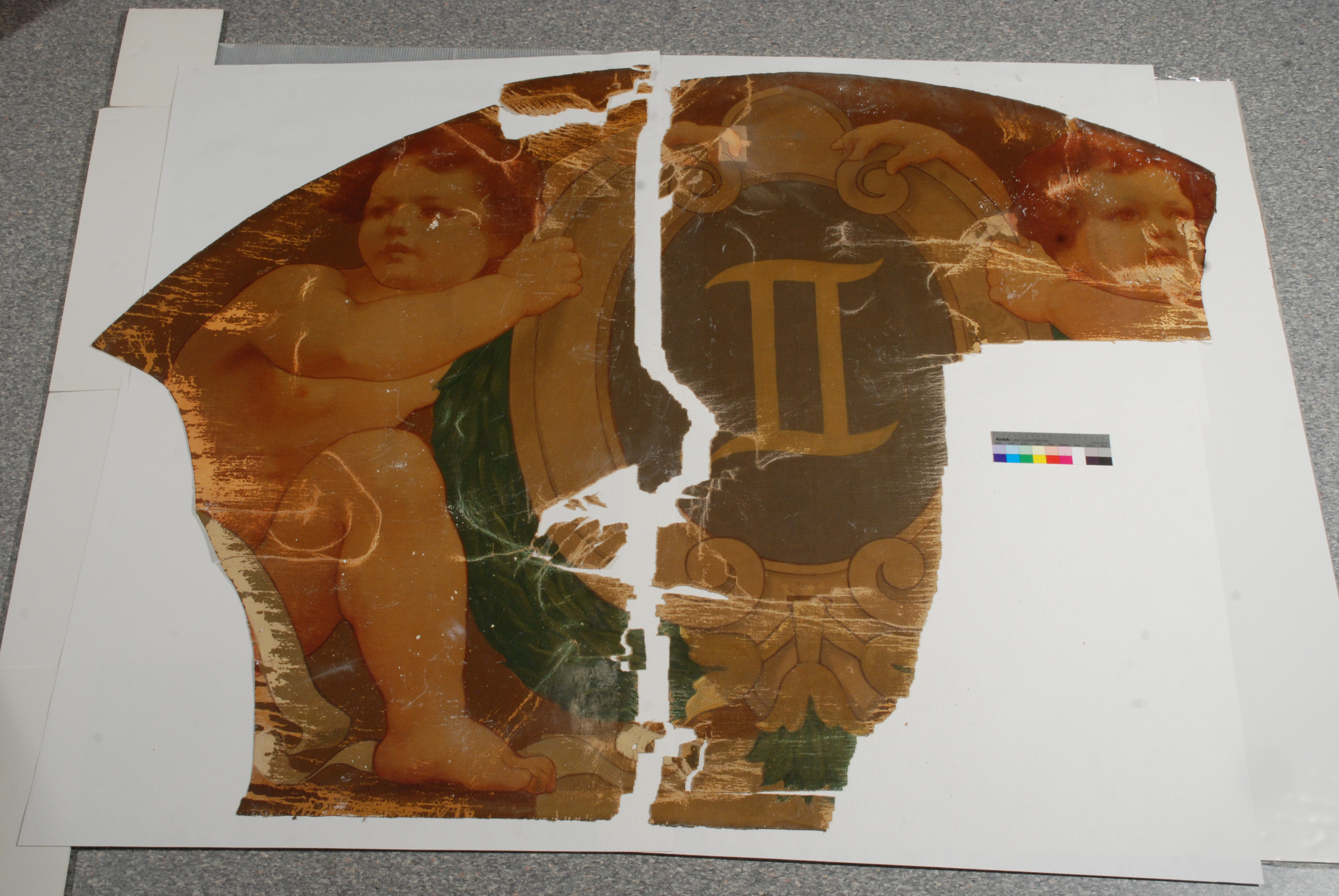
Conservation of damaged mural, Zodiac: Gemini

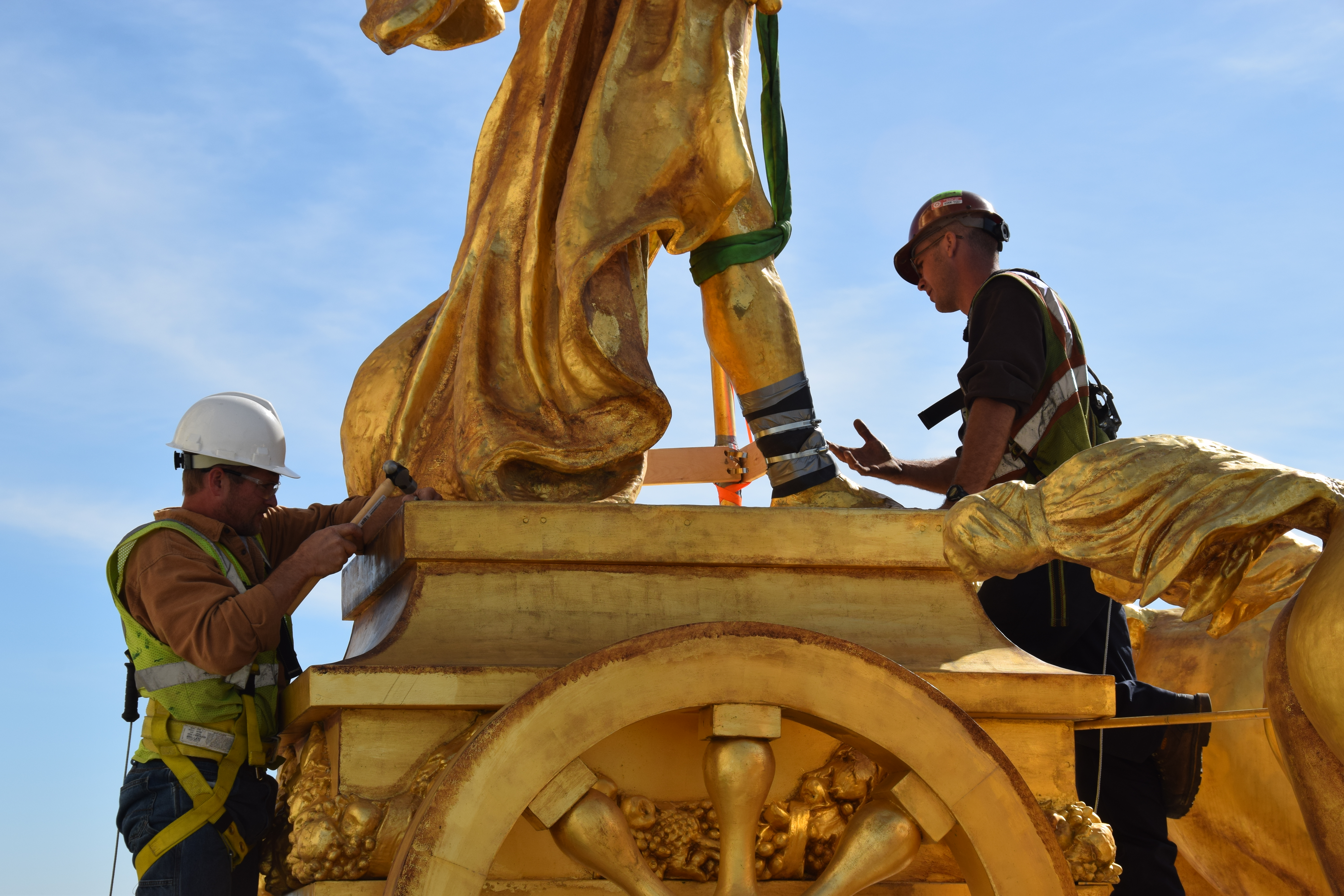
Removal of male charioteer

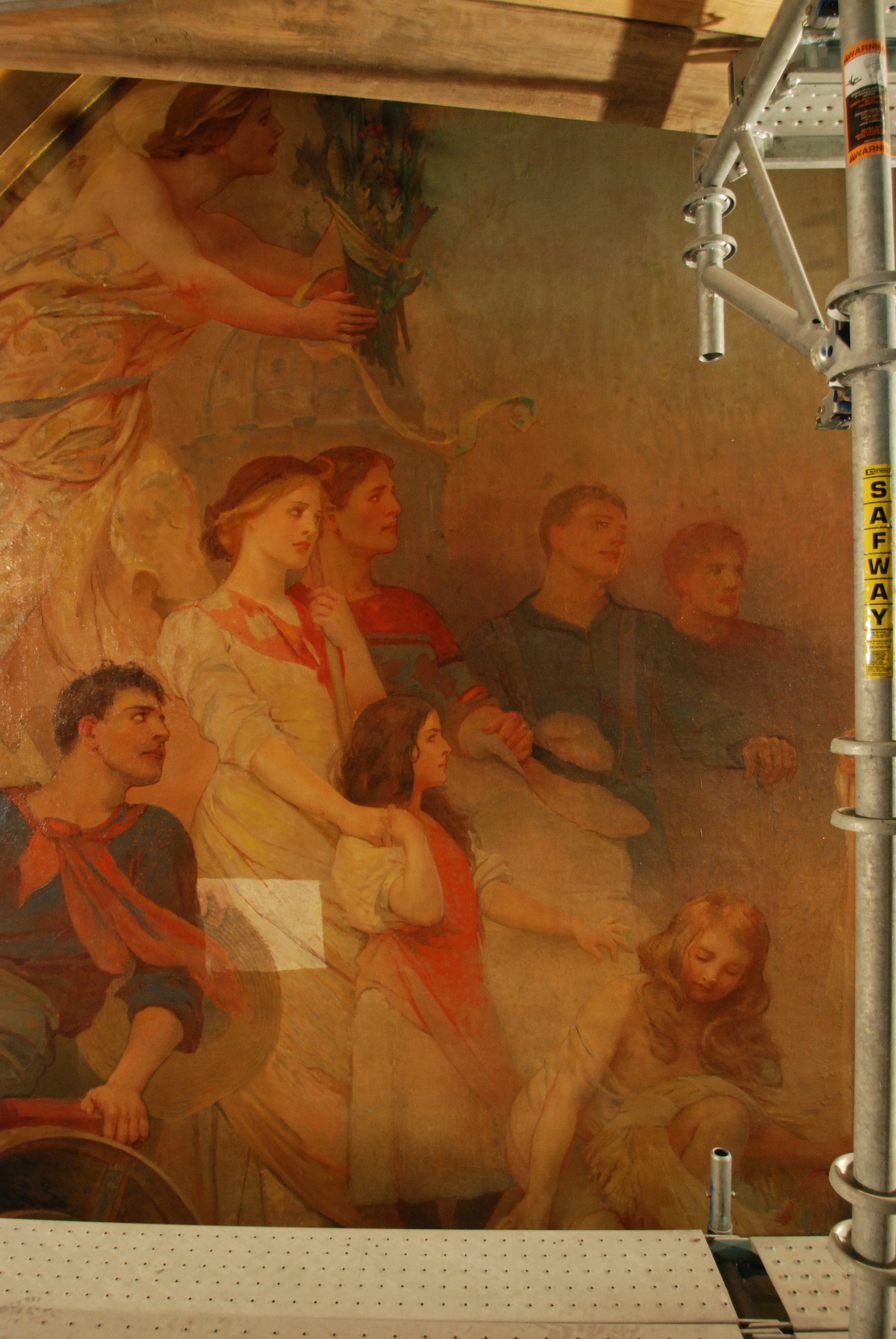
Granary of the World detail

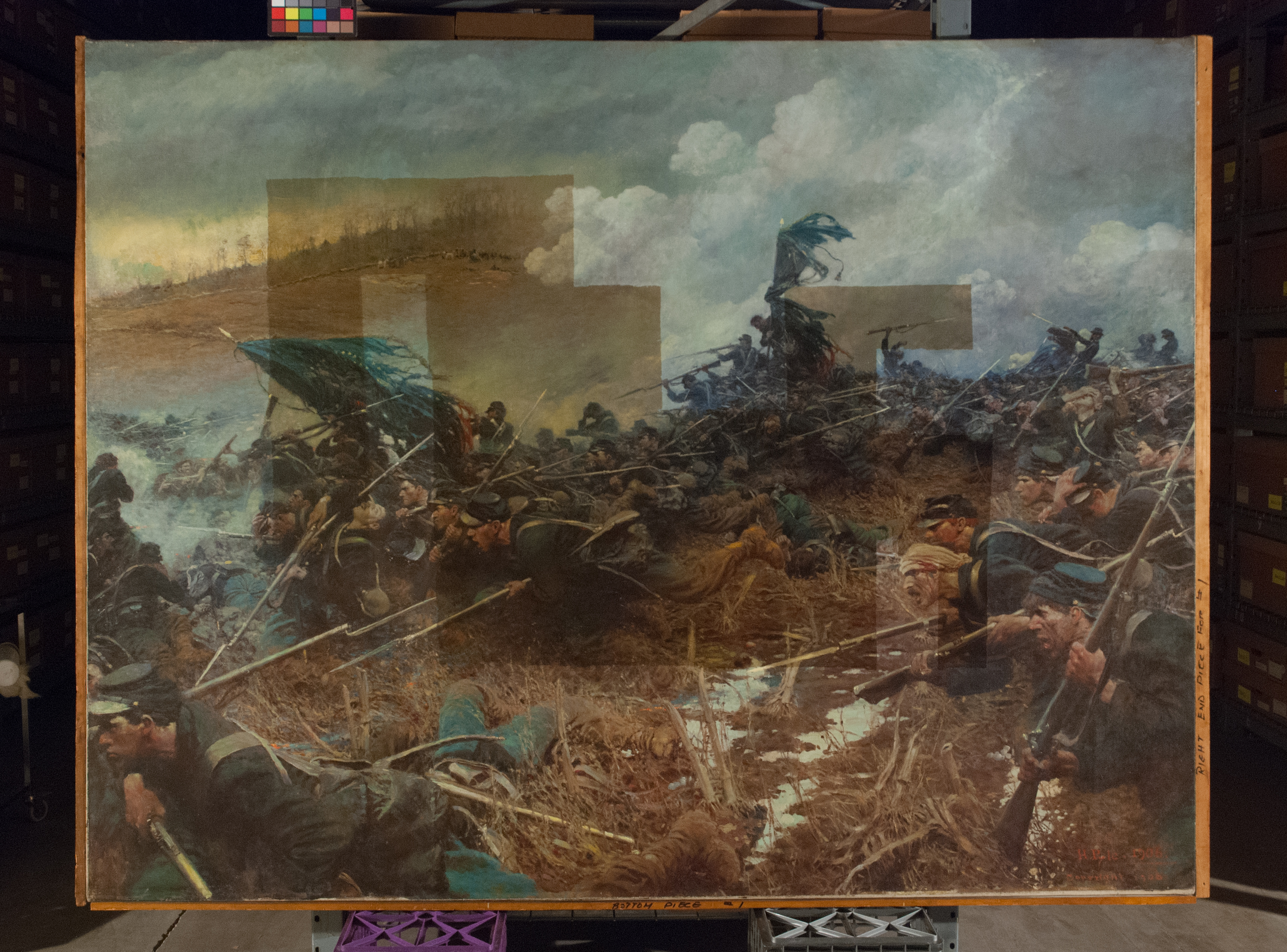
The Battle of Nashville, during restoration

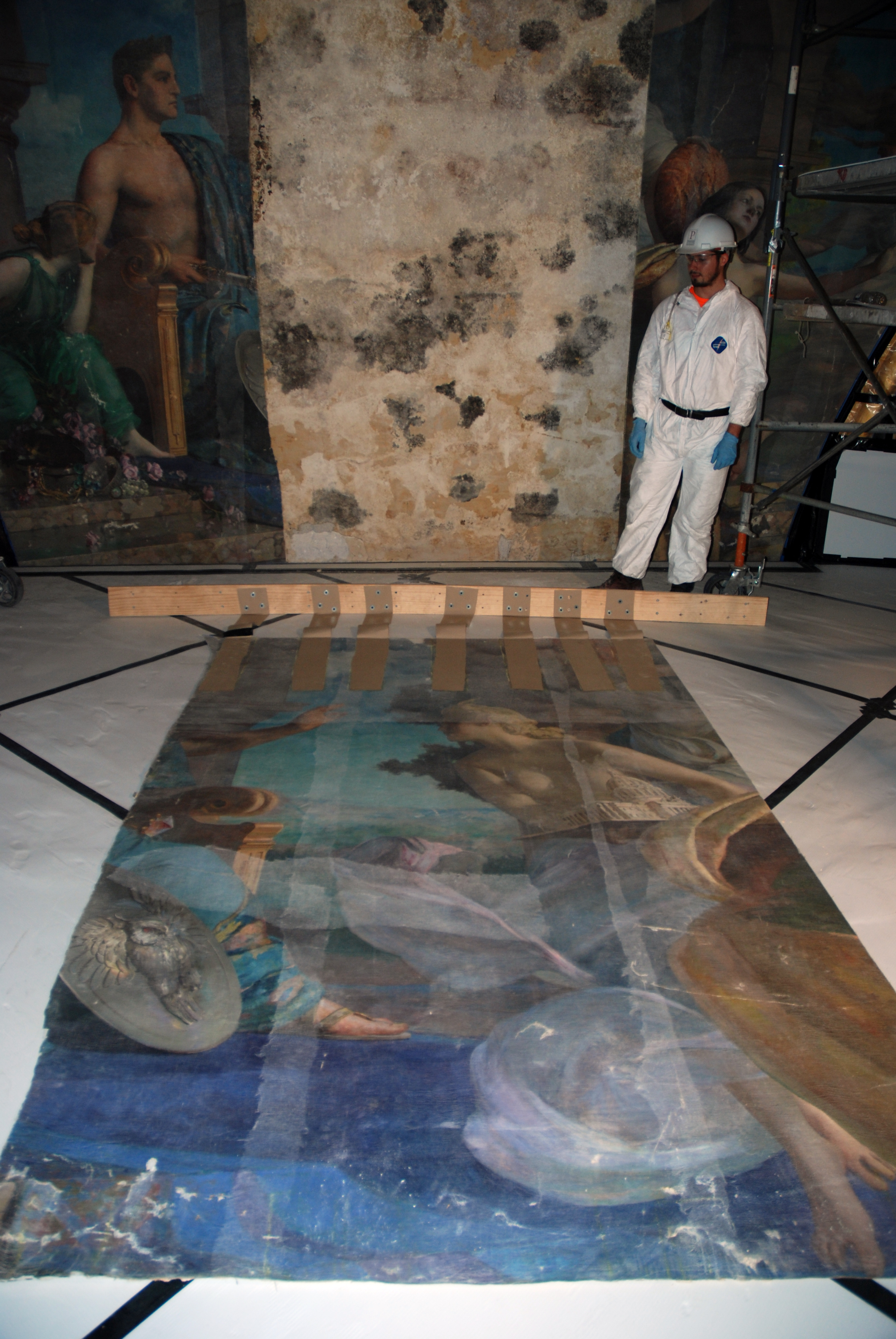
Civilization of the Northwest removal

== Capitol roof ==
=== Quadriga and the Virtues ===
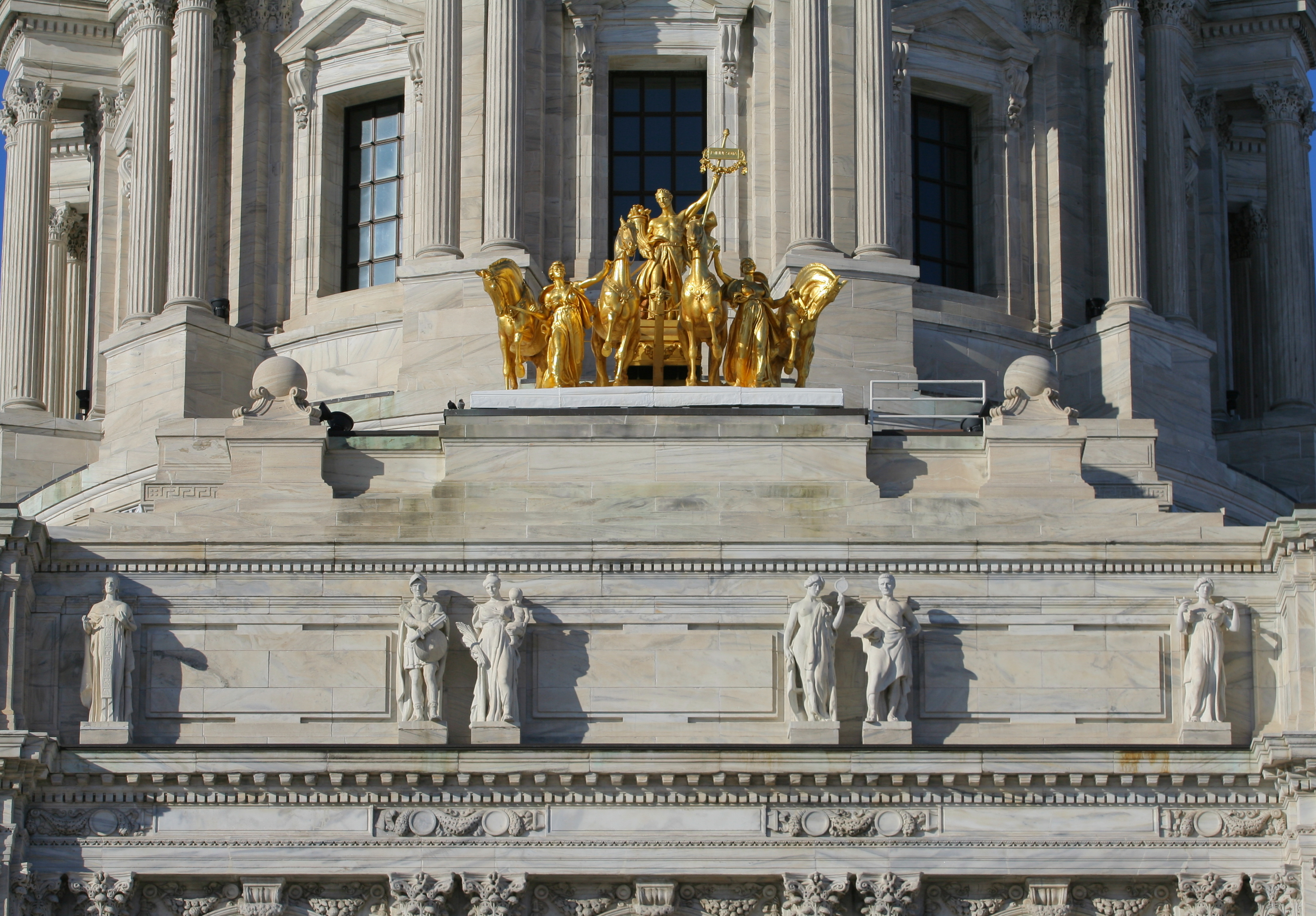
The Quadriga and the Six Virtues.

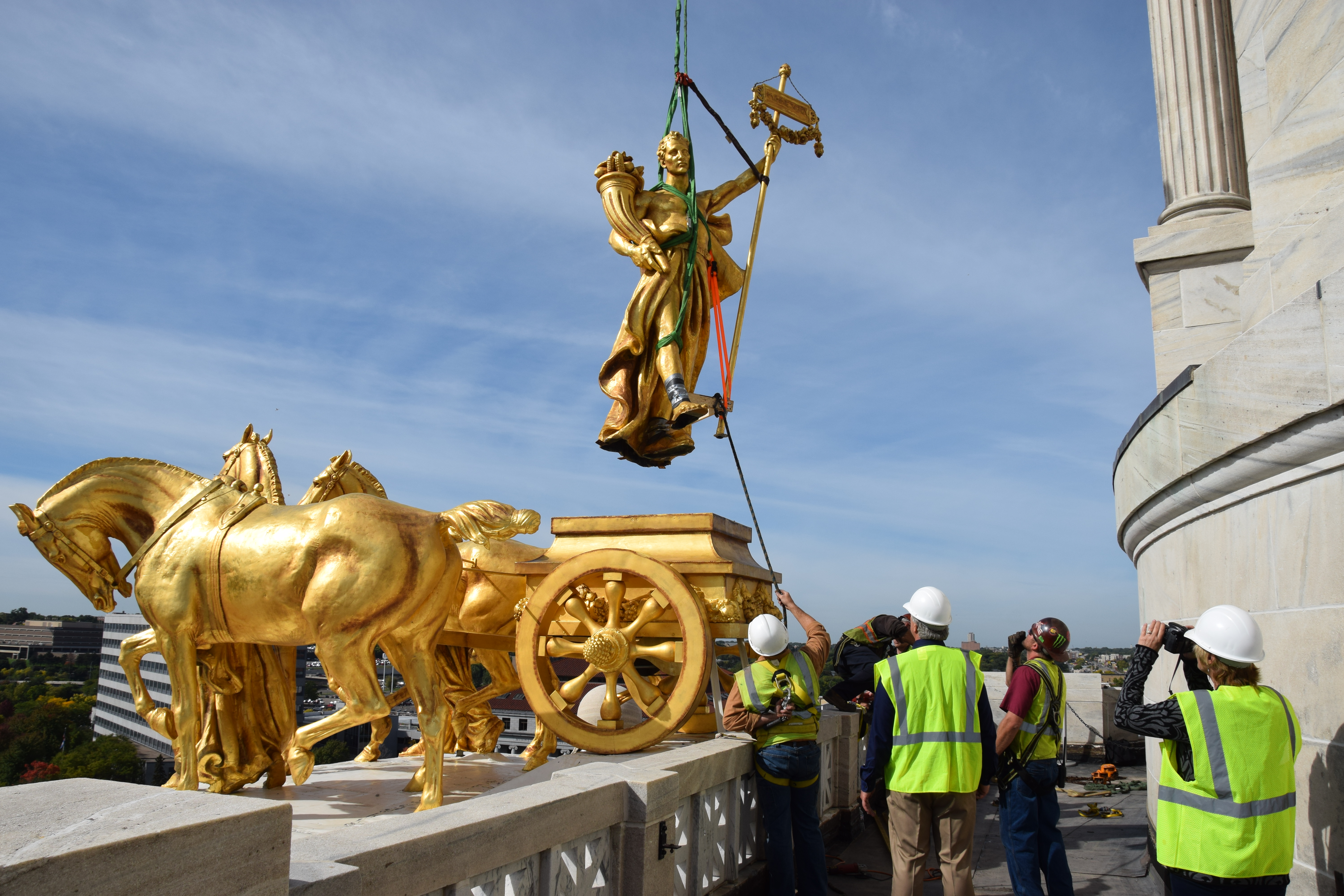
Removal of charioteer for restoration.

Located on the exterior above the southern entrance to the building is a gilded quadriga called The Progress of the State which was sculpted by Daniel Chester French and Edward Clark Potter, a specialist in equestrian and other animal sculptures who teamed up with French to create the four horses in the monument. The inspiration for the Minnesota quadriga, a group of figures entitled Progress of the State, was the Columbus Quadriga, a statue depicting Christopher Columbus standing in a four horse chariot guided by two maidens carrying staffs of victory, that French and Potter had modeled for the World's Columbian Exposition of 1893 in Chicago. Gilbert saw this quadriga group and made plans to have artists adapt it for Minnesota. It was completed and raised to the roof of the capitol in 1906. The quadriga arrangement is a style of statue reproducing ancient Greek and Roman four-horse chariots. The four horses represent the power of nature: earth, wind, fire and water. The women leading the horses symbolize agriculture and industry, and the man on the chariot represents Minnesota.

Re-gilding the sculpture in 23 karat gold leaf is necessary approximately every 20 years. Every year, the condition of the statuary is reviewed with conservators making slight repairs and touching up the gold leaf as necessary. The sculpture group underwent re-gilding in 1949 and again in 1979. In 1994/1995, the statues underwent a year-long restoration procedure which involved replacing the corroded steel supports inside each statue and replacing the gold leaf on the figures. The golden sphere perched on the lantern above the capitol dome had similar treatment. In 2014 the figure of the charioteer was removed and lowered to the ground to allow repairs to corrosion to the top surface of the chariot and was reinstalled in 2015. On May 7, 2016, the Quadriga was again removed from the roof in order to allow for roofing repairs below. During that time the statuary was relocated to nearby warehouse where it was re-gilded. On November 12, 2016 the Quadriga was re-installed on the Minnesota State Capitol roof.

=== Virtues ===
The six marble figures on the façade located just under the Quadriga represent "the six virtues that support and assist the progress of the state – the underlying virtues of good citizenship," as explained in the 1907 official guide to the State Capitol endorsed by Gilbert. The four female and two male figures represent Wisdom, Courage, Bounty, Truth, Integrity, Prudence. According to custom in the turn-of-the-nineteenth-century, French did not carve the statues himself but rather modeled them in clay at half-size, then skilled stone cutters worked, shaped, and carved them in marble on the grounds of the Capitol. A failure in communication resulted in the delivered marble blocks for the Virtues were too small for the planned size of the statues. The resulting statues were reduced to a height of 65 inches rather than the planned 96 inches. The original marble statues, which had deteriorated from the effects of weather and pollution were replaced by marble replicas carved in the 1970s. The original plaster models for the virtues have dissipated over time. While the provenances for Wisdom and Truth have been tracked down, the models for Courage, Bounty, Integrity, and Prudence have vanished. Wisdom is located in collections of the Boston Athenaeum and Truth is at the collections in Art Institute of Chicago.

Original plaster models of Virtues

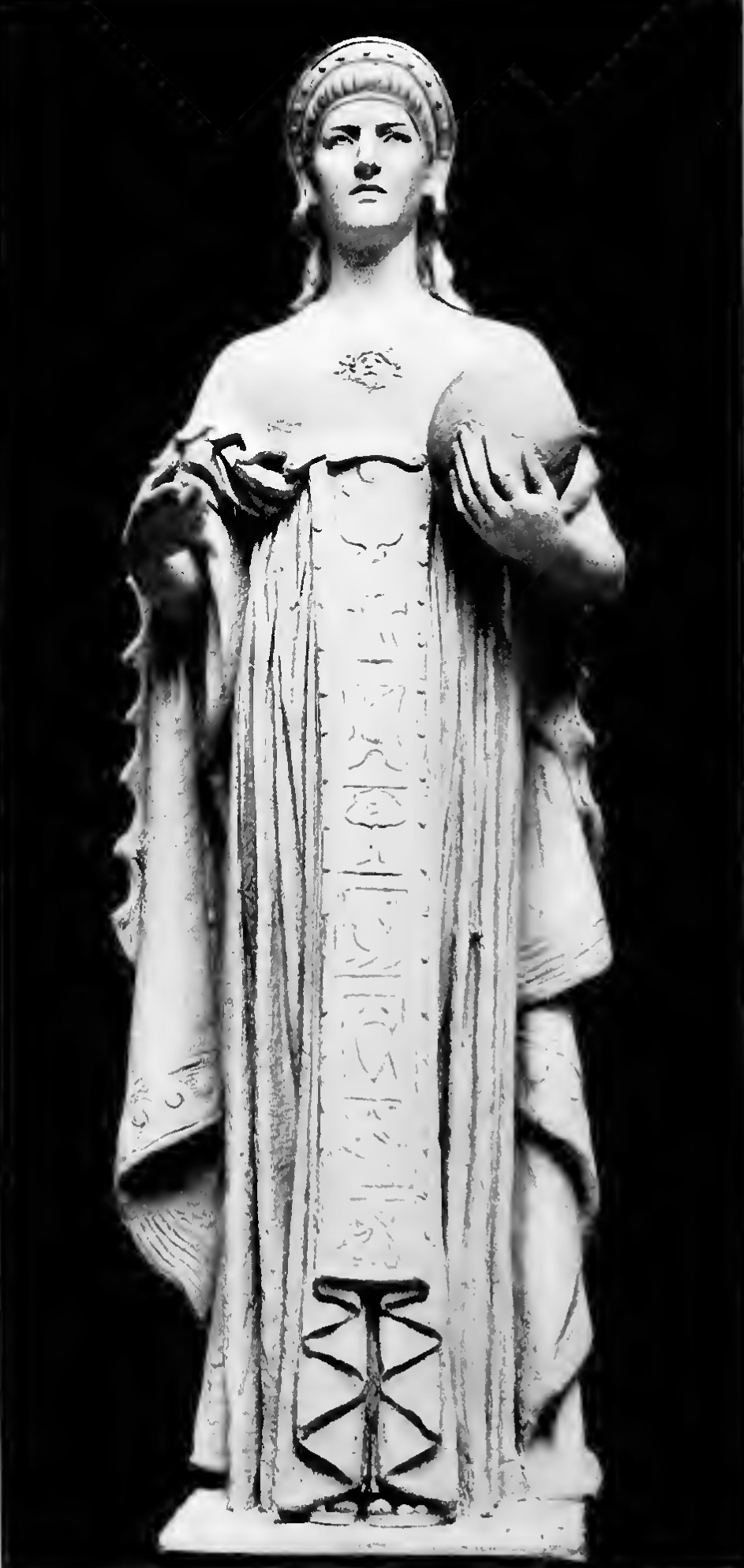
Wisdom

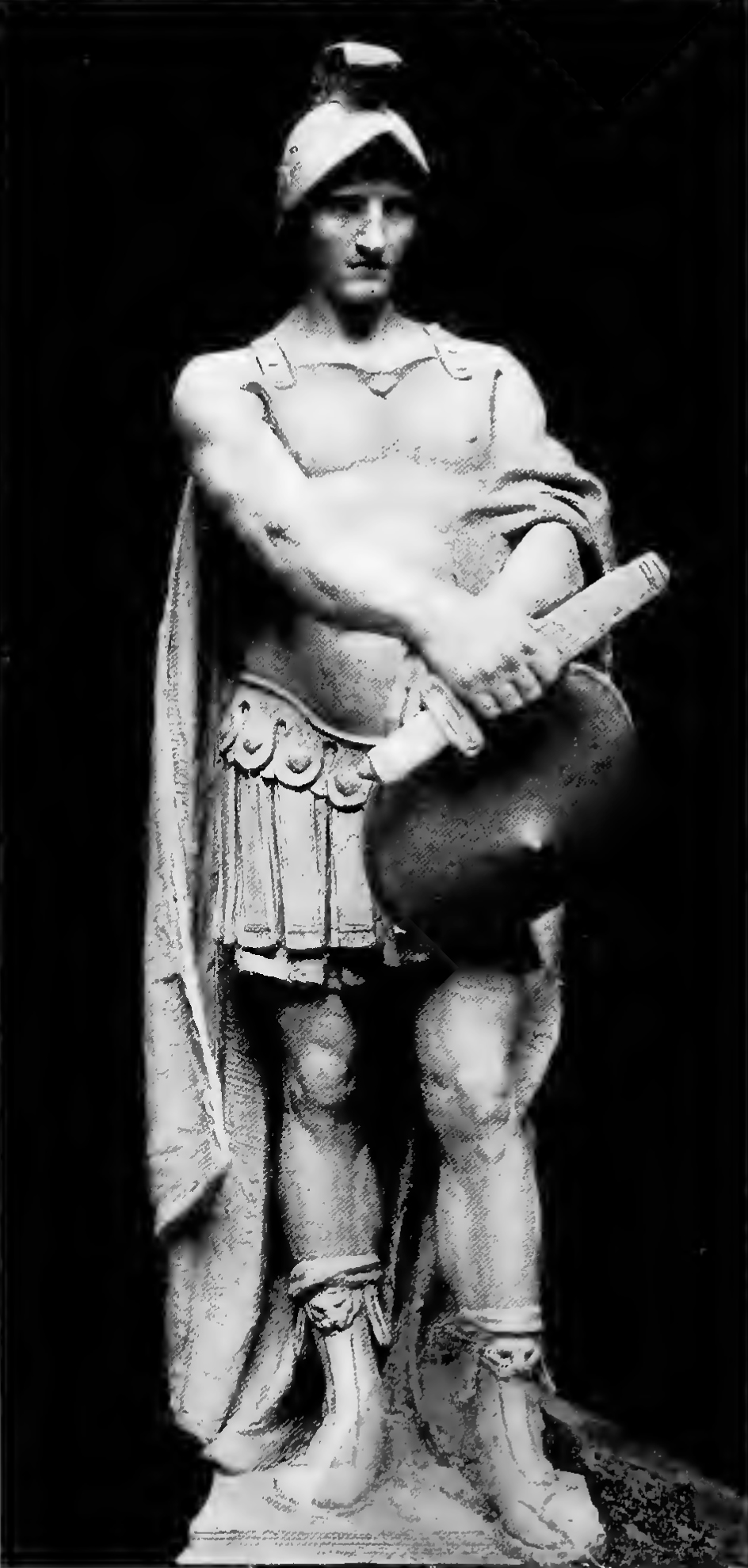
Courage

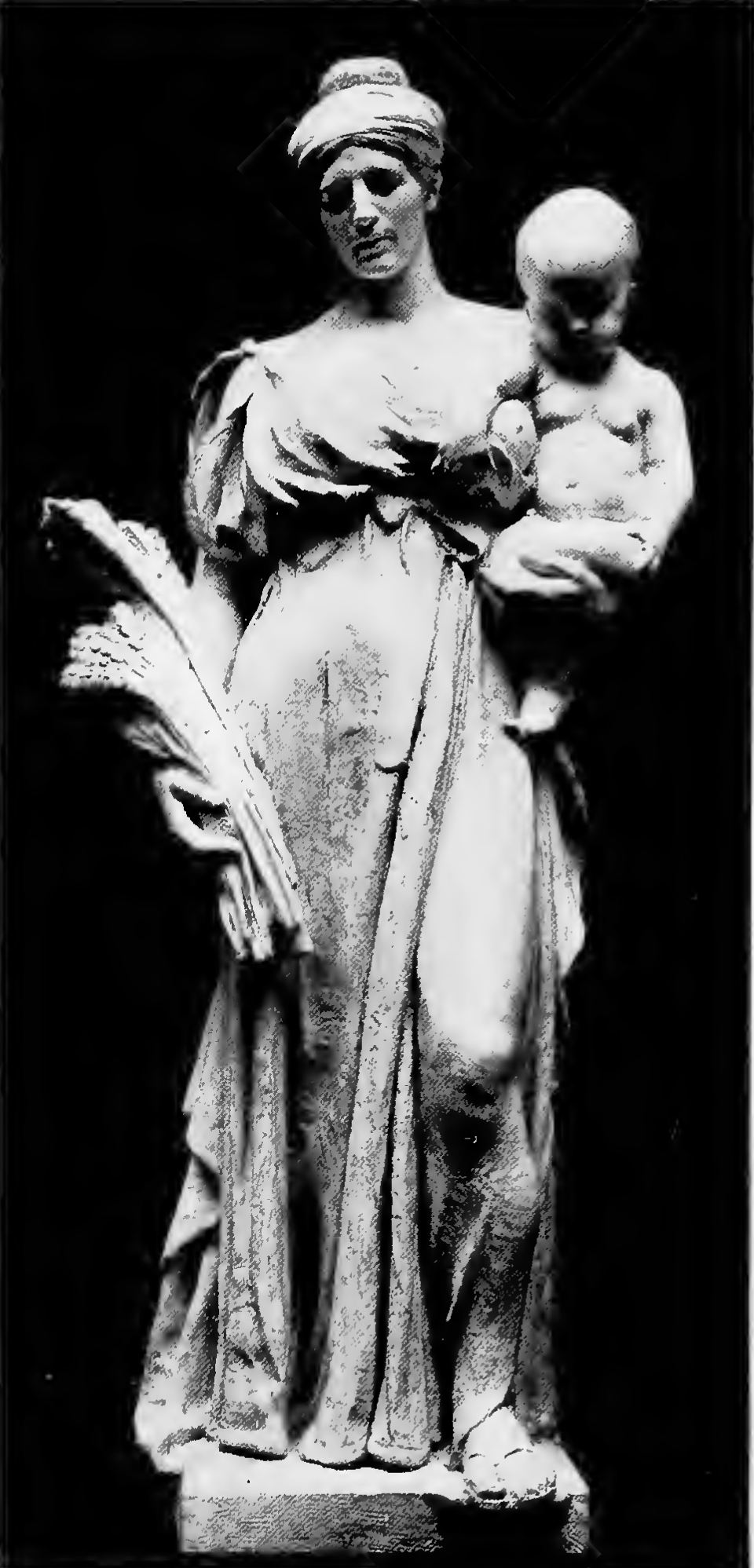
Bounty

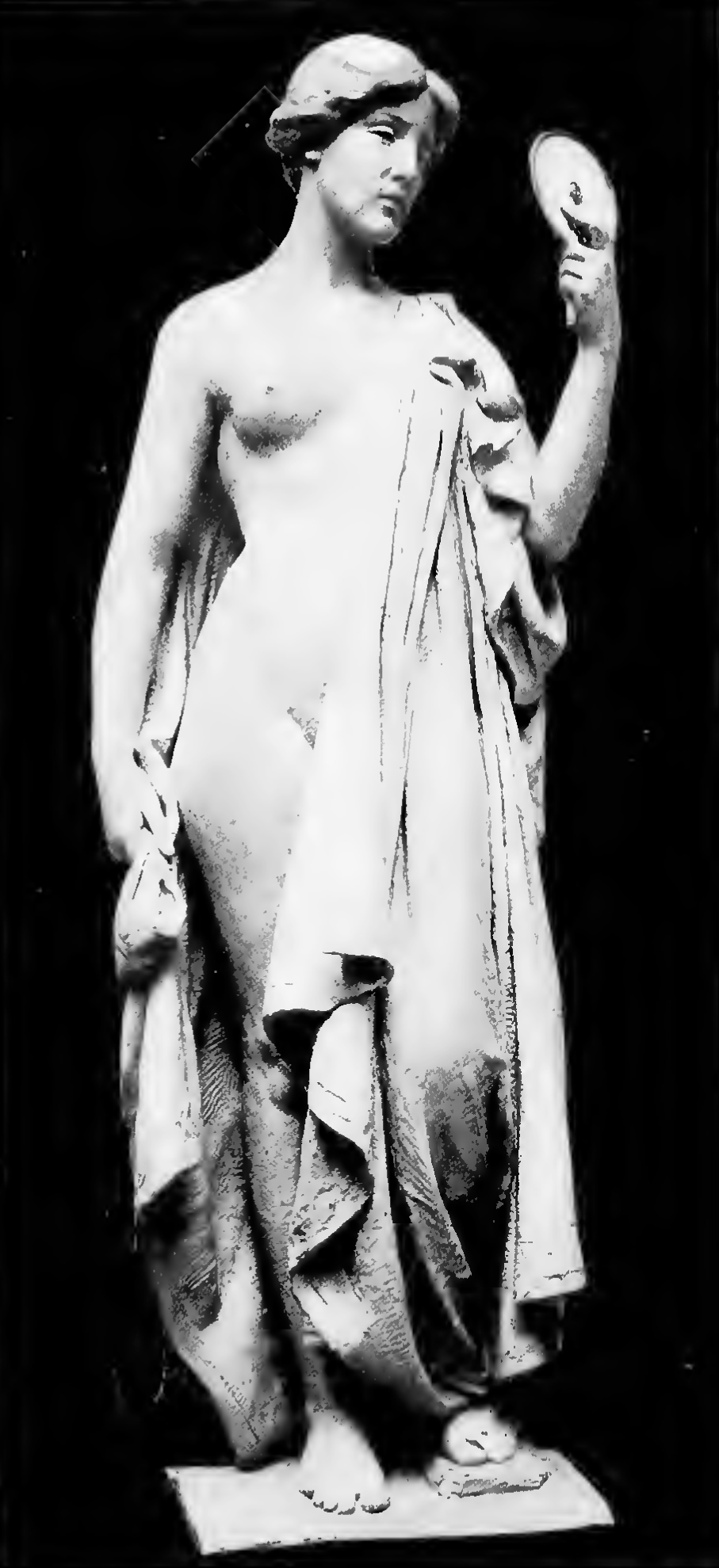
Truth

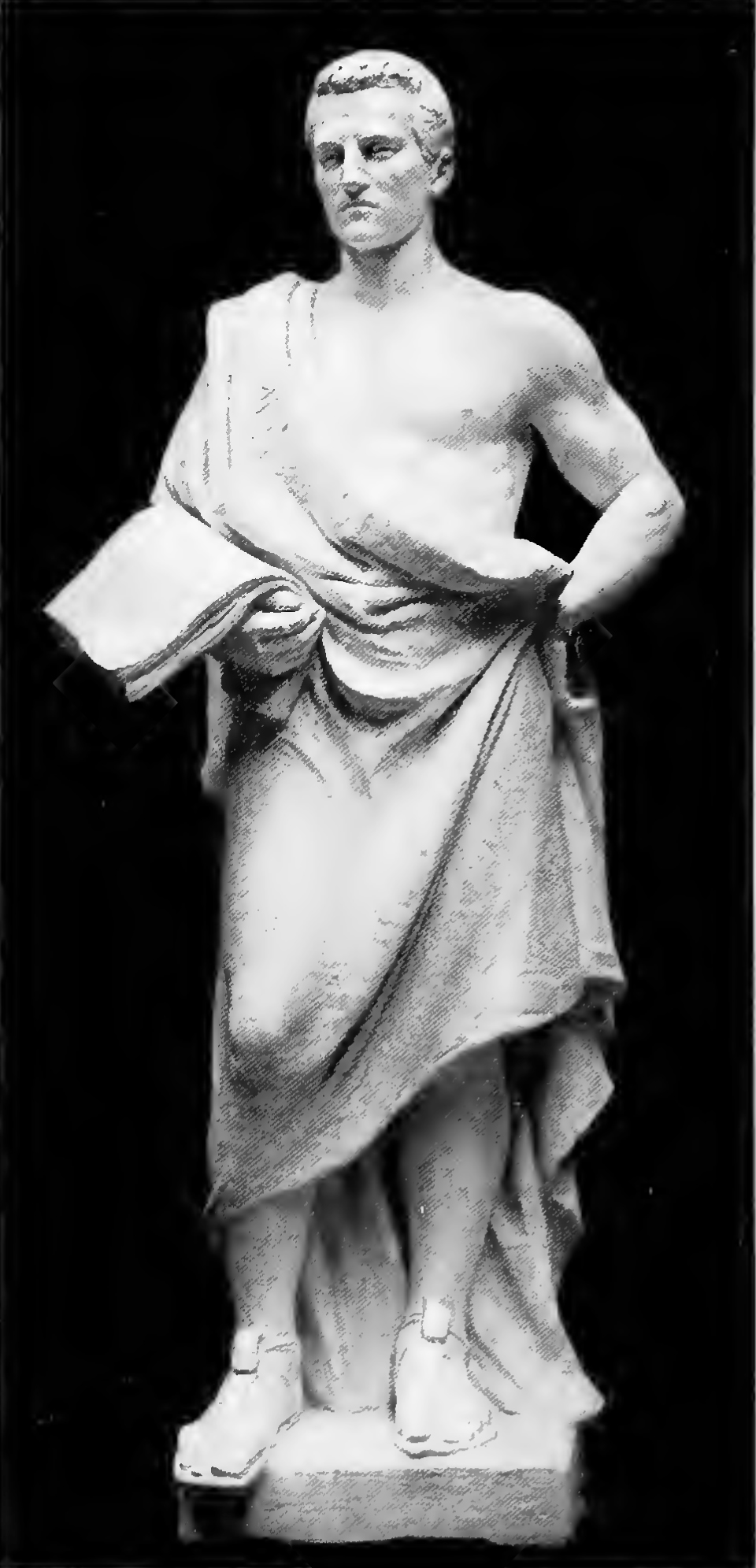
Integrity

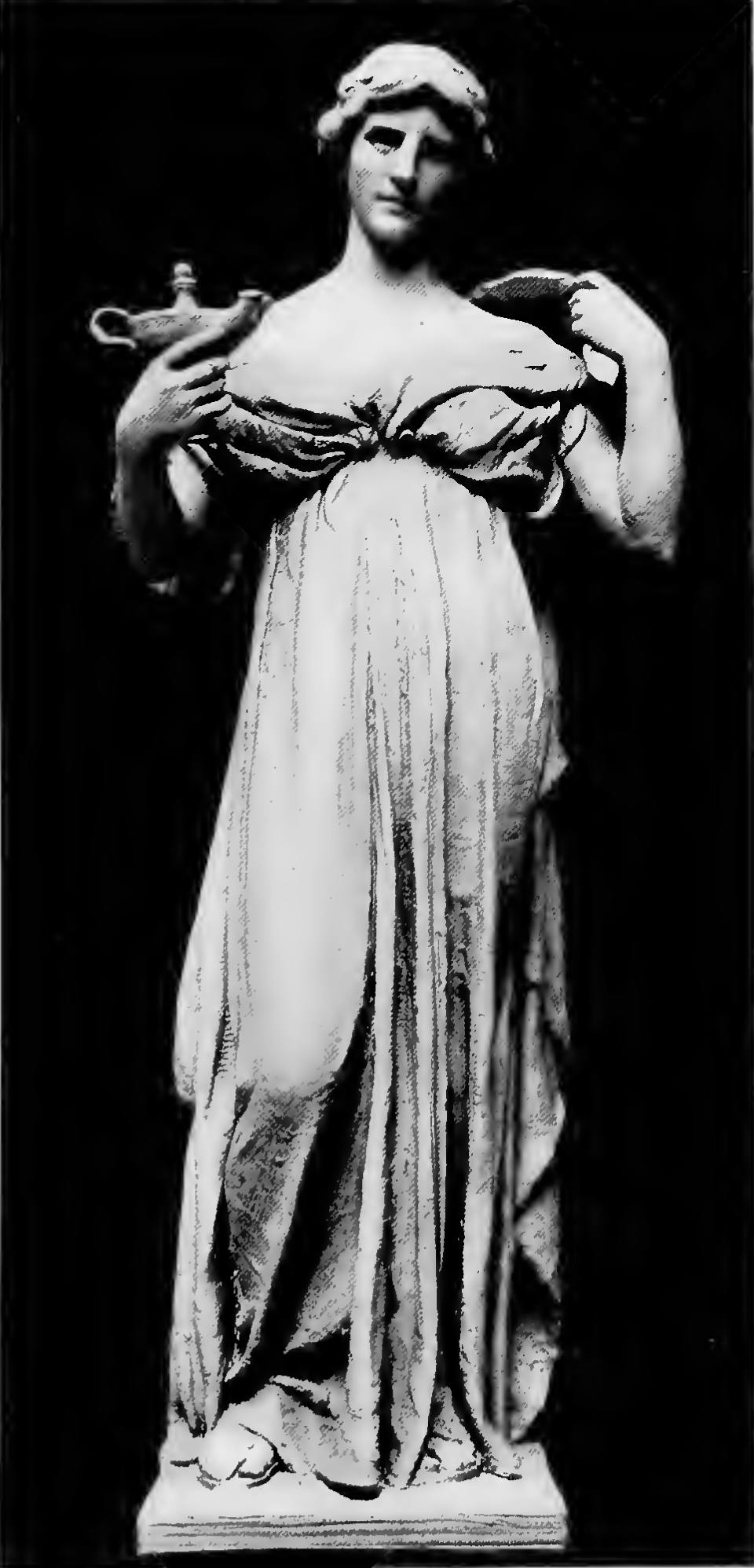
Prudence

== Dome ==
=== Zodiacs ===
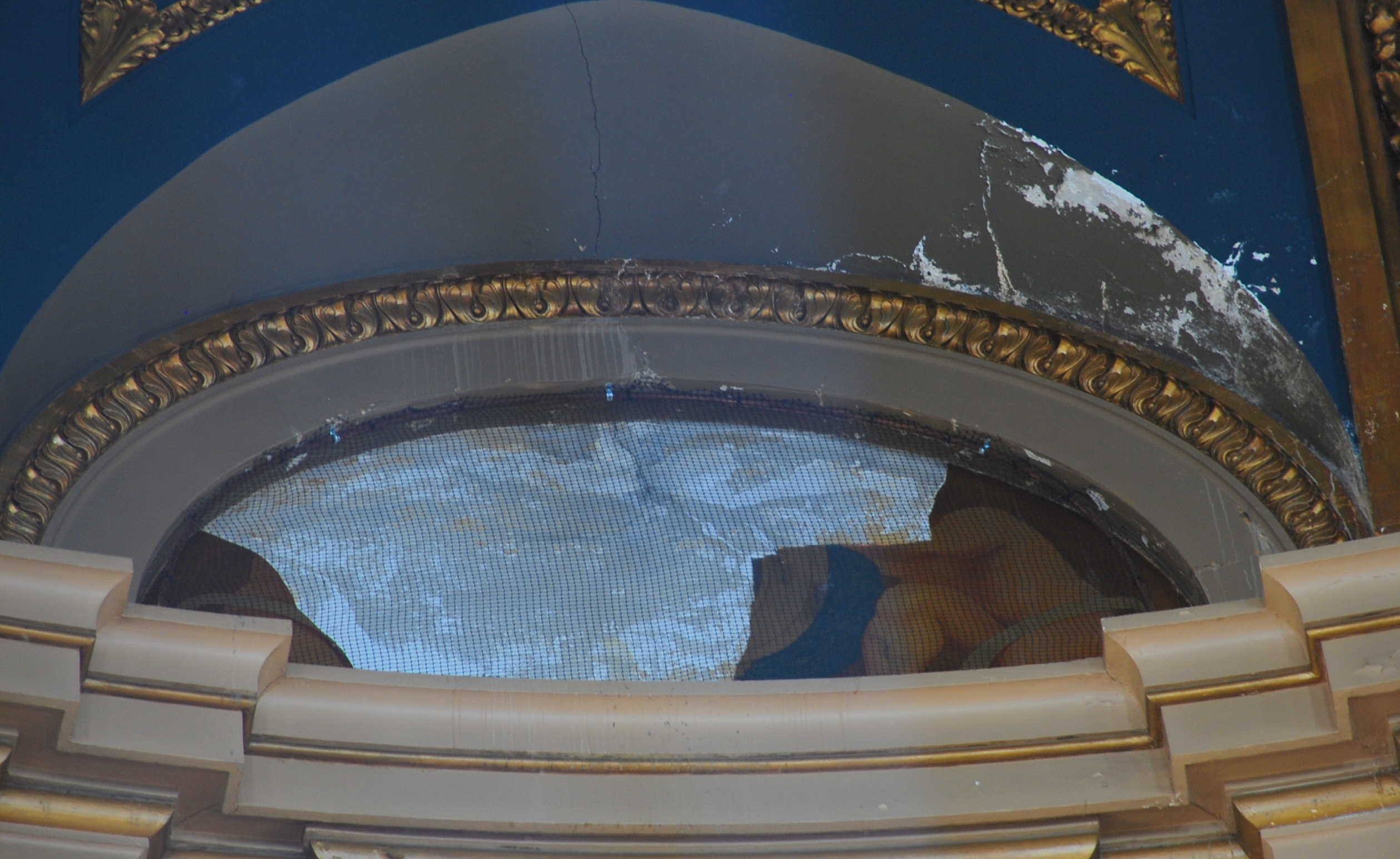
Damaged Gemini Zodiac mural

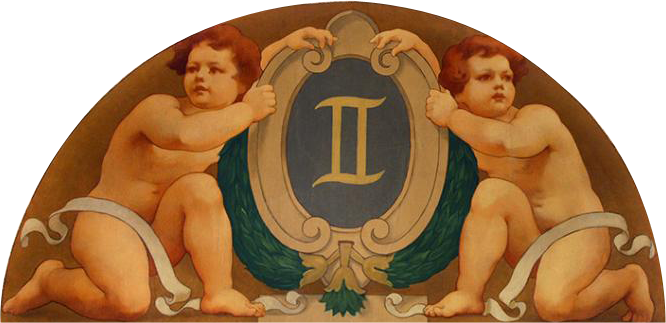
Gemini Zodiac mural

Gemini Zodiac mural: Left, damaged; Right, restored.

The dome is divided into twelve vertical panels. Shallow penetrations at the base of the dome form lunettes over each of the twelve windows, in which two putti hold a framed symbol of the zodiac which suggests the constellations in the skies above. All were designed by Elmer Garnsey and painted by his assistant Arthur Willett.

In 2010 the half of the Gemini mural broke free. Because of work going on to the dome, its fall to the floor was interrupted by a tarp. The mural was later restored during the renovation of the Capitol from 2013 to 2017.

== Rotunda artwork ==
=== The four Civil War Alcove monuments ===
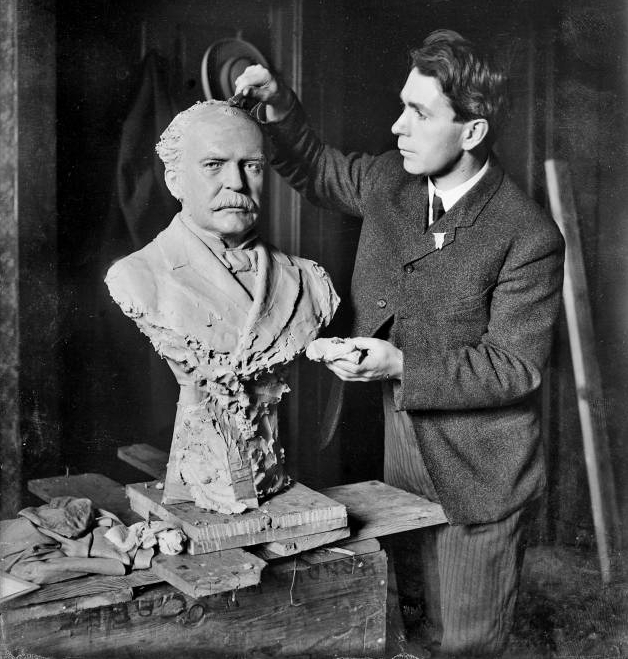
John K. Daniels

Catherine Backus

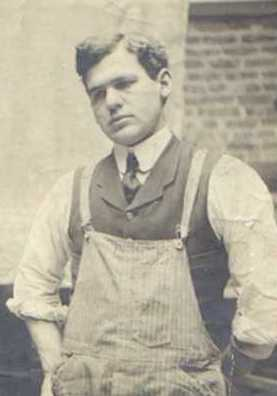
Frederick Hibbard

Sculptors, left to right: John K. Daniels, Catherine Backus, Frederick Hibbard

In alcoves on the second floor of the Capitol, rotunda stand the larger-than-life statues of Civil War heroes John B. Sanborn, Alexander Wilkin, William Colvill, and James Shields. All four were prominent figures in 19th century Minnesota.

Minnesota sculptor John Karl Daniels did both the Alexander Wilkin and John B. Sanborn statues. These were the first of several statues he did at the Capitol including three on the Capitol grounds, Knute Nelson in 1928, Leif Erikson in 1949, and the Earthbound Monument in 1956. The statue of James Shields by Chicago artist Frederick Cleveland Hibbard is a second casting with the original at the Carroll County Courthouse, Carrollton, Missouri. Because the original design work had been paid for by a state appropriation of $10,000 from the Missouri Legislature, Minnesota veteran groups were able to get a second casting from Daniels for $1,450 for placement in the Capitol rotunda.

The Col. William Colville [sic] Monument Commission was appointed by Governor Johnson in 1907. At a meeting in St. Paul, the commission asked the opinion of Chicago sculptor, Laredo Taft, who was in the city at the time. While he did not recommend any of the models, he thought the model by Catherine Backus had points in its favor. They selected Backus' model to execute in full-size bronze. Other models were presented were by John K. Daniels and the P. N. Peterson Granite Company. The appropriation for the monument was $10,000. Backus had met Colvill in Red Wing, Minnesota, and had the opportunity to draw him. After his death, she later made a death mask of his head and face.

Cass Gilbert was not pleased with any of the four immense bronze Civil War statues that stand on the second floor of the building and he was least satisfied with the work of Minneapolis artist Catherine Backus, who rendered the memorial to William Colvill he called a "damned bad statue." Gilbert wanted a sculptor of international repute to do Colvill's statue. When the citizens' group that commissioned Backus ignored that wish, he wrote to the group: "You now have before you models for this important work by persons who are naturally ambitious but who, so far as I can ascertain, utterly lack the training and experience to execute the work." Biographer Egerton Swartwout described Gilbert as "purposely impressive in manner and rather pompous at times." As the architect of the Minnesota Capitol, he was driven to control its every detail, including the monuments that would stand inside.

Despite Gilbert's evaluation, the work by Backus was placed in the Capitol, and many other memorials without Gilbert's blessing followed. Backus also went on to design a bas relief bronze memorial plaque for the First Minnesota Volunteer Infantry, which is mounted on a wall on the Capitol's first floor. In 1928 President Coolidge dedicated a second casting of Backus' William Colvill statue in Cannon Falls, Minnesota, Colvill's hometown

Major General James Shields

Shields the best-known of the group due to his dueling with Abraham Lincoln. Shields was a brigadier general in the Army of the Potomac during the civil war. Fighting in the Shenandoah Valley in March 1862, Shields delivered Stonewall Jackson's only defeat at the Battle of Kernstown and was gravely wounded in the process. Later he went on to become the only man to serve as a senator in three states — Illinois, Minnesota, and Missouri. He also was the governor of the Oregon Territory.

General Alexander Wilkin

Of the four Civil War veterans cast in bronze at the Capitol, only Gen. Alexander Wilkin died in battle. He was the highest-ranking Minnesota officer to perish in the Civil War. He died while he was supposed to be in reserve in Tupelo, Mississippi. Confederate officer Nathan Bedford Forrest was raiding heavily in middle Tennessee at the time. Wilkin was among those Gen. William Sherman thought could stop Forrest. Union casualties near Tupelo were slight in the ensuing battle, but Wilkin was among them.

Wilkin founded St. Paul Fire and Marine Insurance Company before the war. Like Shields, was not averse to a duel. Wilkin shot and killed a fellow officer who challenged him during the Mexican War. In 1868, Minnesota's Wilkin County was named after him.

Colonel William Colvill

Colonel William J. Colvill led the First Minnesota Regiment at Gettysburg in Pennsylvania, the bloodiest battle ever fought on American soil. The First Minnesota suffered more than 80 percent casualties in July 1863, and Colvill was wounded during the second day of the three-day battle. He returned to Minnesota weak from his wounds but survived to age 75. In 1905, Colvill was the first man to lie in state in the present Capitol.

Brevet Major John B. Sanborn

Sanborn was Minnesota's adjutant general when the Civil War began. Commander of the Fourth Minnesota volunteer infantry, he was one of two brigade commanders in charge of Vicksburg, Mississippi after Gen. Ulysses S. Grant took the city. Sanborn was a lawyer and both a state senator and representative. He eventually became president of the Minnesota Historical Society and was a member of the society for 48 years.

Civil War Alcove Monuments

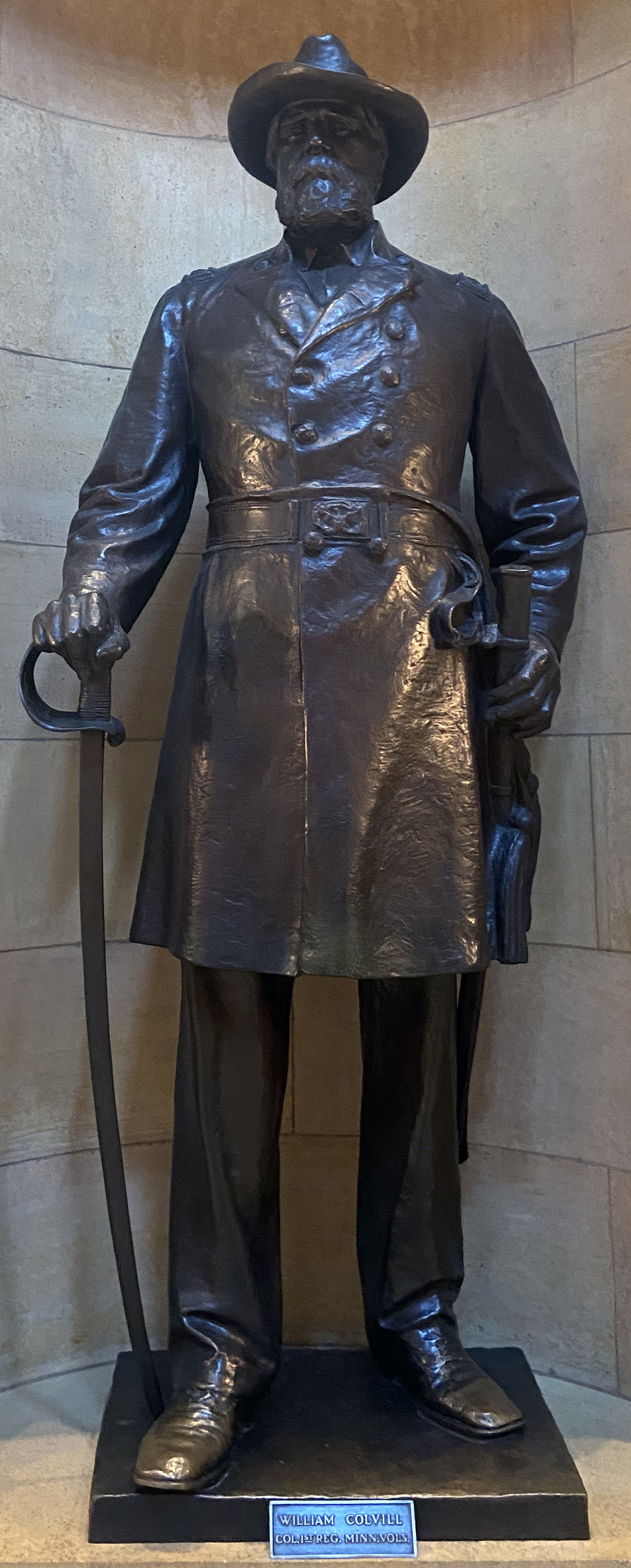
William J. Colvill

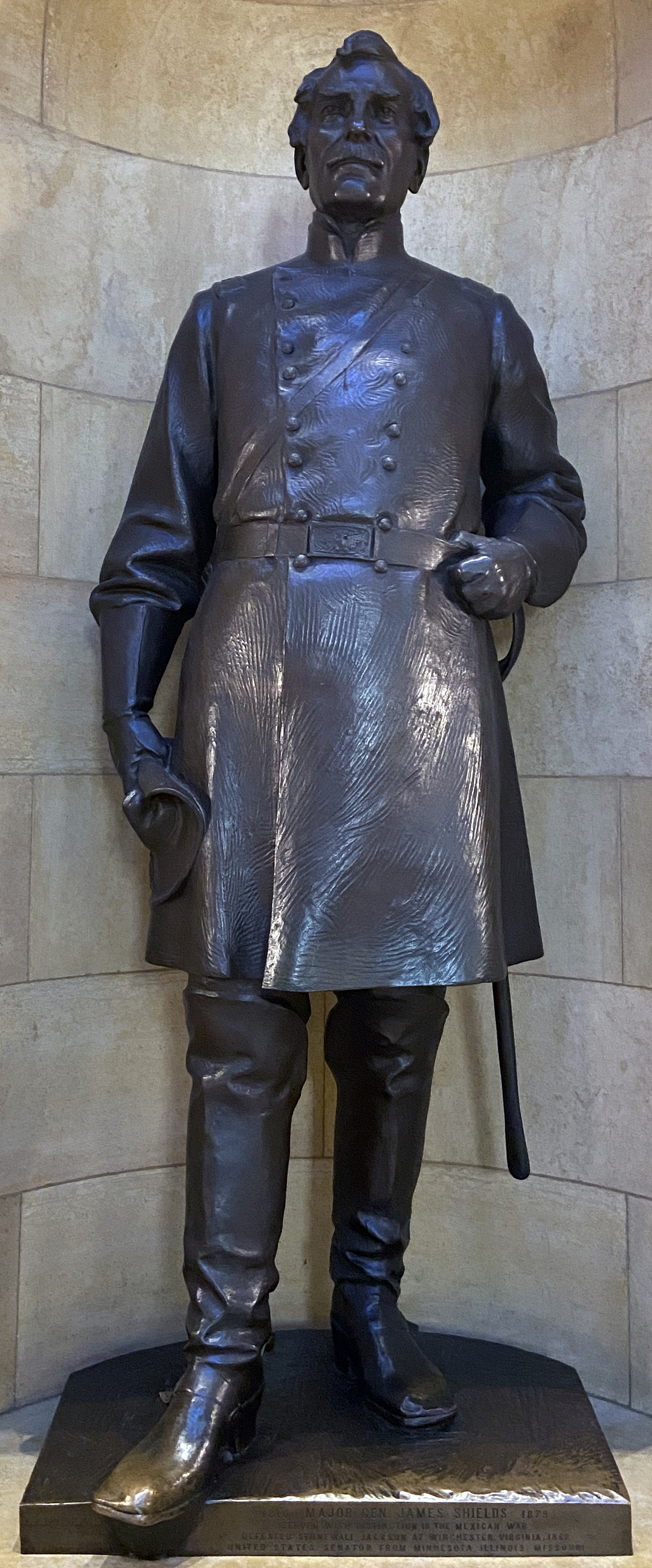
James Shields

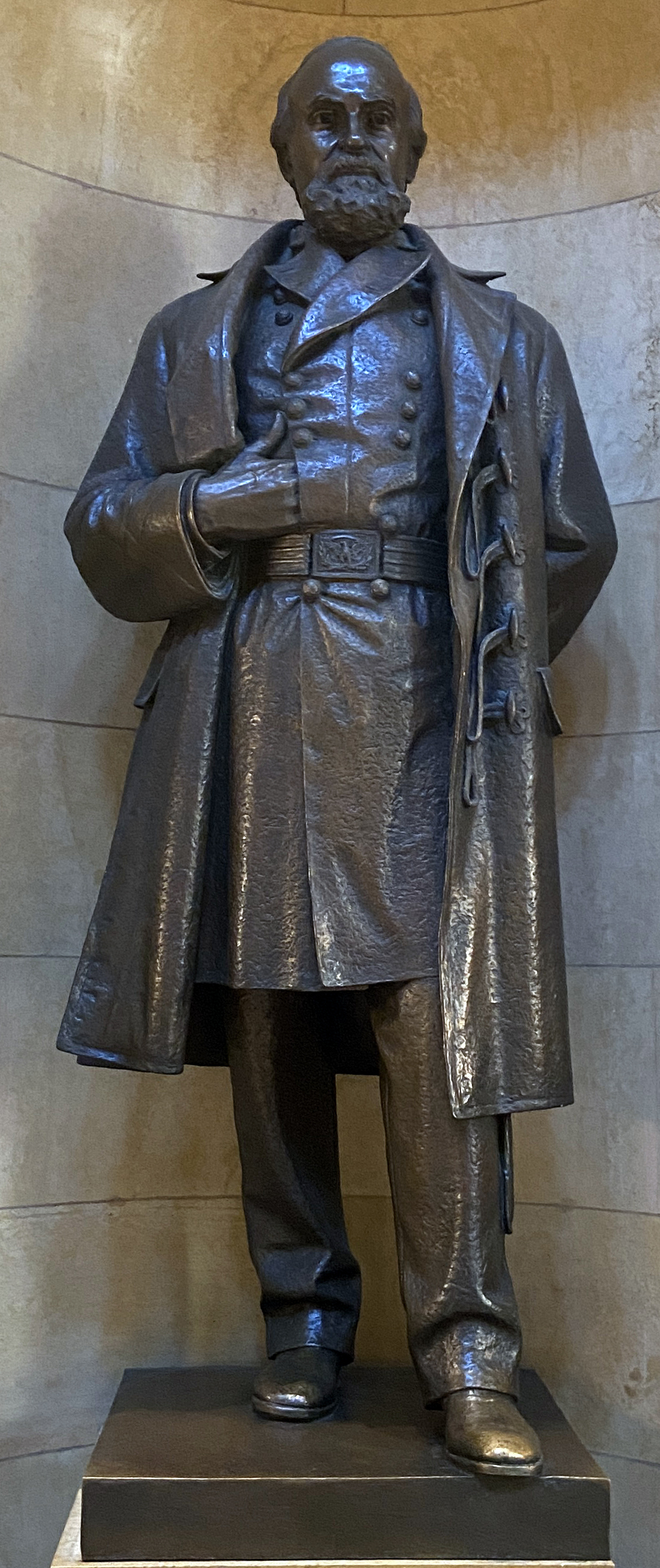
John B. Sanborn

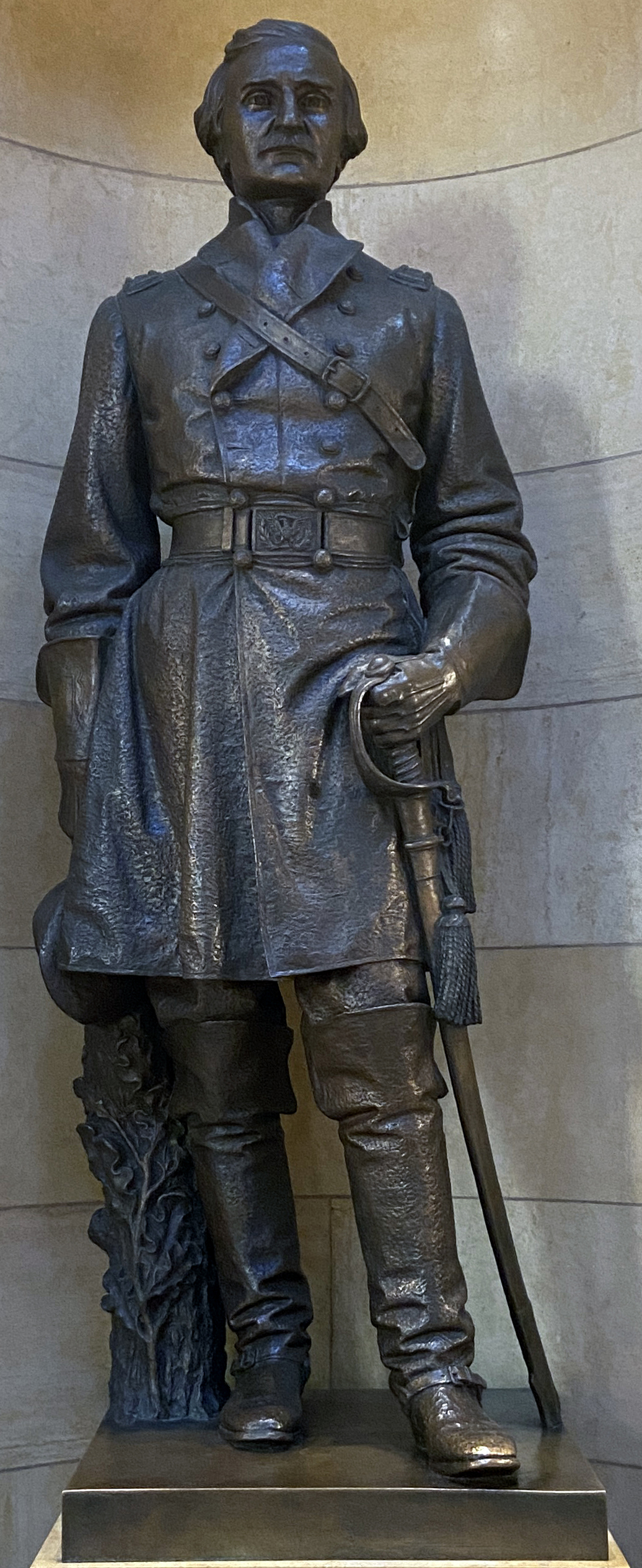
Alexander Wilkin

=== Civilization of the Northwest ===
Roughly twenty-eight feet long and thirteen feet in height and over ninety feet from the rotunda floor the four-panel set titled Civilization of the Northwest: The American Genius on the rotunda walls is the largest of all the murals in the Capitol. The murals were completed by Edward Simmons, an American Impressionist painter, a member of the Ten American Painters, who, as a group, seceded from the Society of American Artists. The commission to paint the murals was both a surprise to Simmons as well as one of the largest undertakings he ever did. In a romantic manner, it demonstrates an idealized turn-of-the-19th century chronicle of Minnesota's evolution. The first panel represents the young man leaving home; the second, the cleaning up of the land; the third, breaking the soil, which he does by lifting a great stone out of a hole from which issues a young girl bearing maize; and in the last panel, the young man is crowned and sends the four winds to the four quarters of the globe bearing the gifts of Minnesota. In every panel he is accompanied by Hope and in all but the last panel he is accompanied by Minerva (Wisdom). In the last panel having acquired Wisdom, Minerva is now gone and her shield is at his feet.

While the allegorical symbolism used in the paintings would have been more widely understood during the time they were painted, objects can hold not one, but many meanings and it appeared to be a challenge for some as Simmons accounted in this 1922 biography,

"There were several guides in the Capitol employed to show the visitors around and explain the sights to them. I thought it would be splendid for me to give them special instructions about my work, so that they would not make the usual ludicrous mistakes. But guides seem to be a different breed of animal chosen for the wide range of their imaginations. I supposed everything was going all right, when one day a particularly loquacious one came to me and showed me a miniature palette in his buttonhole, telling me he was an artist himself and belonged to a club of artists. He knew all about the ladies in my decoration—the one veiled in chiffon (which I had made for Hope) he called Sin, entirely neglecting the nude woman in the foreground (Sin) clinging to a grizzly (Savagery). He had probably received his early education in and about a Burlesque show."

On a 94 degree day in 1912, one of the panels separated from the wall and fell to the floor of the rotunda and had to be re-glued in place.

Civilization of the Northwest Murals

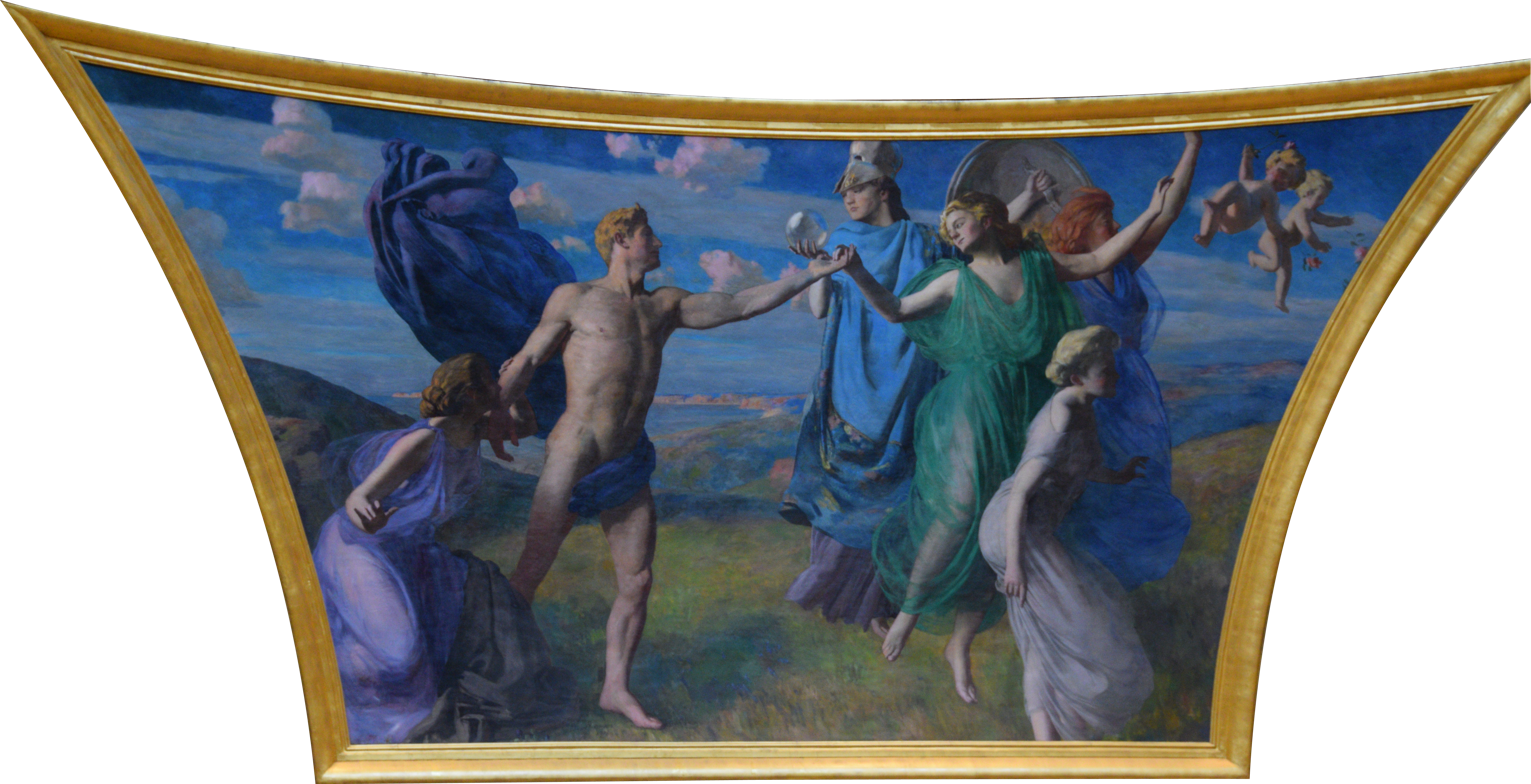
Panel 1
(Southeast Corner)

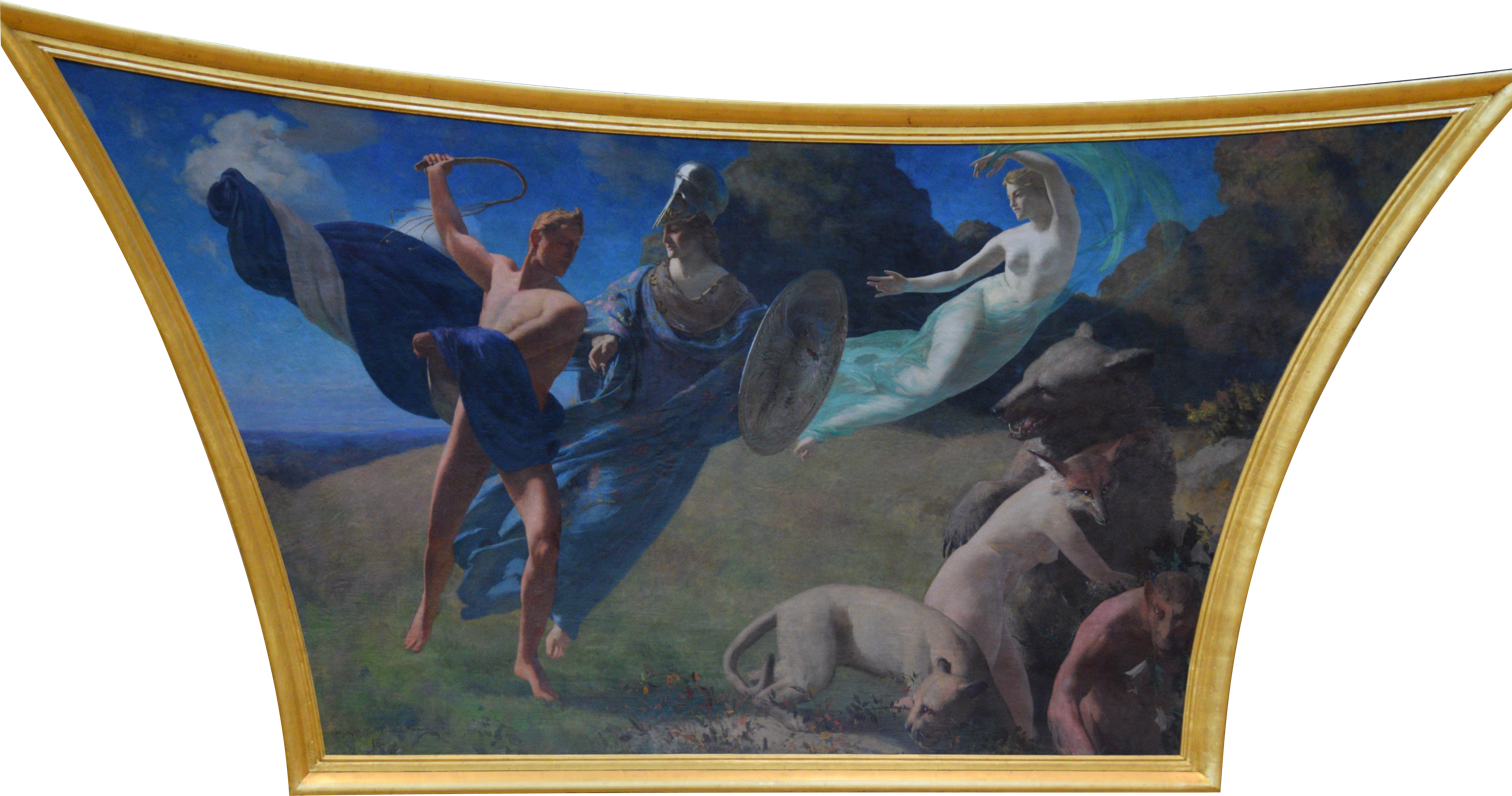
Panel 2
(Southwest Corner)

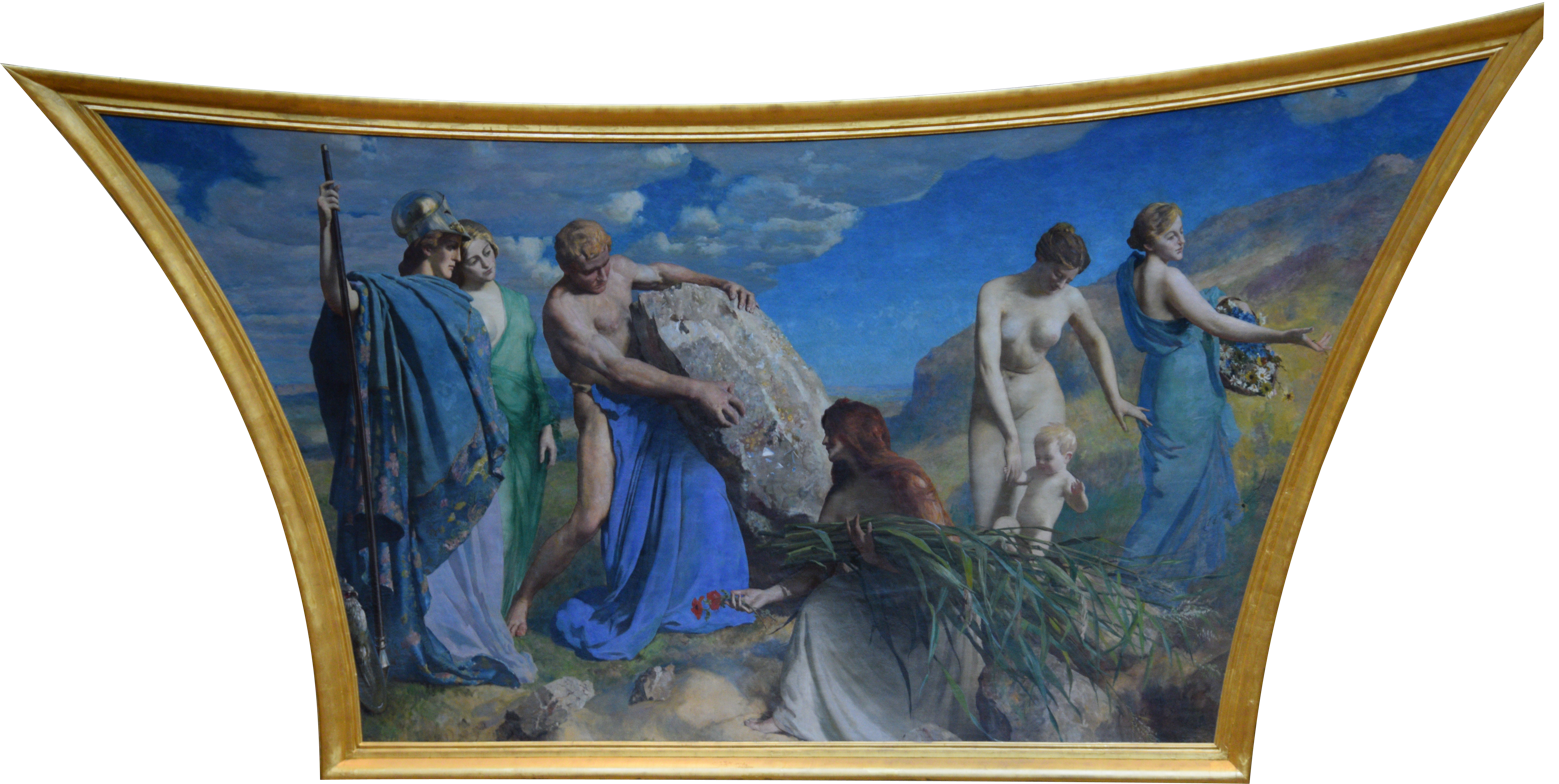
Panel 3
(Northwest Corner)

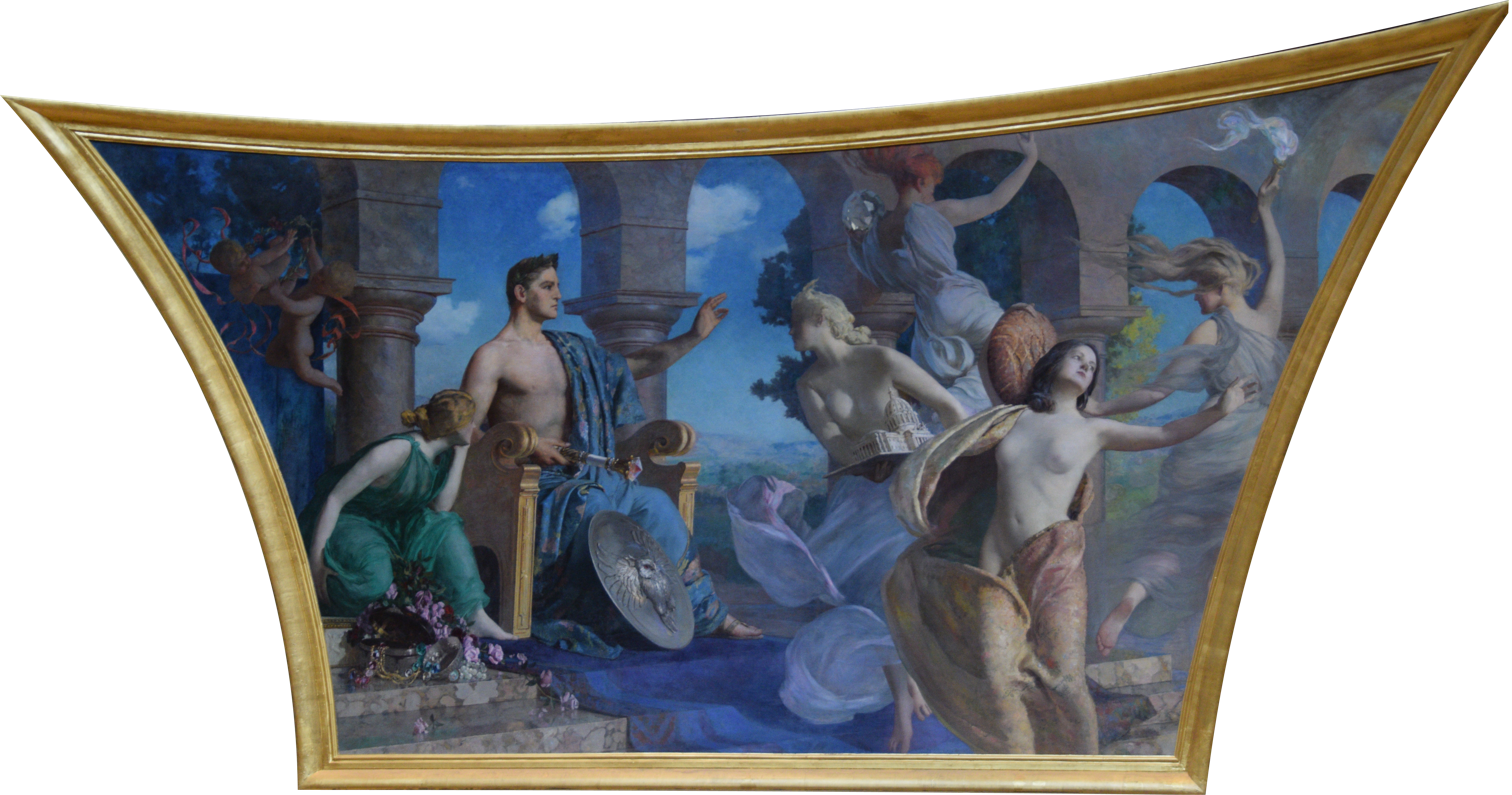
Panel 4
(Northeast Corner)

== Governor's Reception Room artwork ==
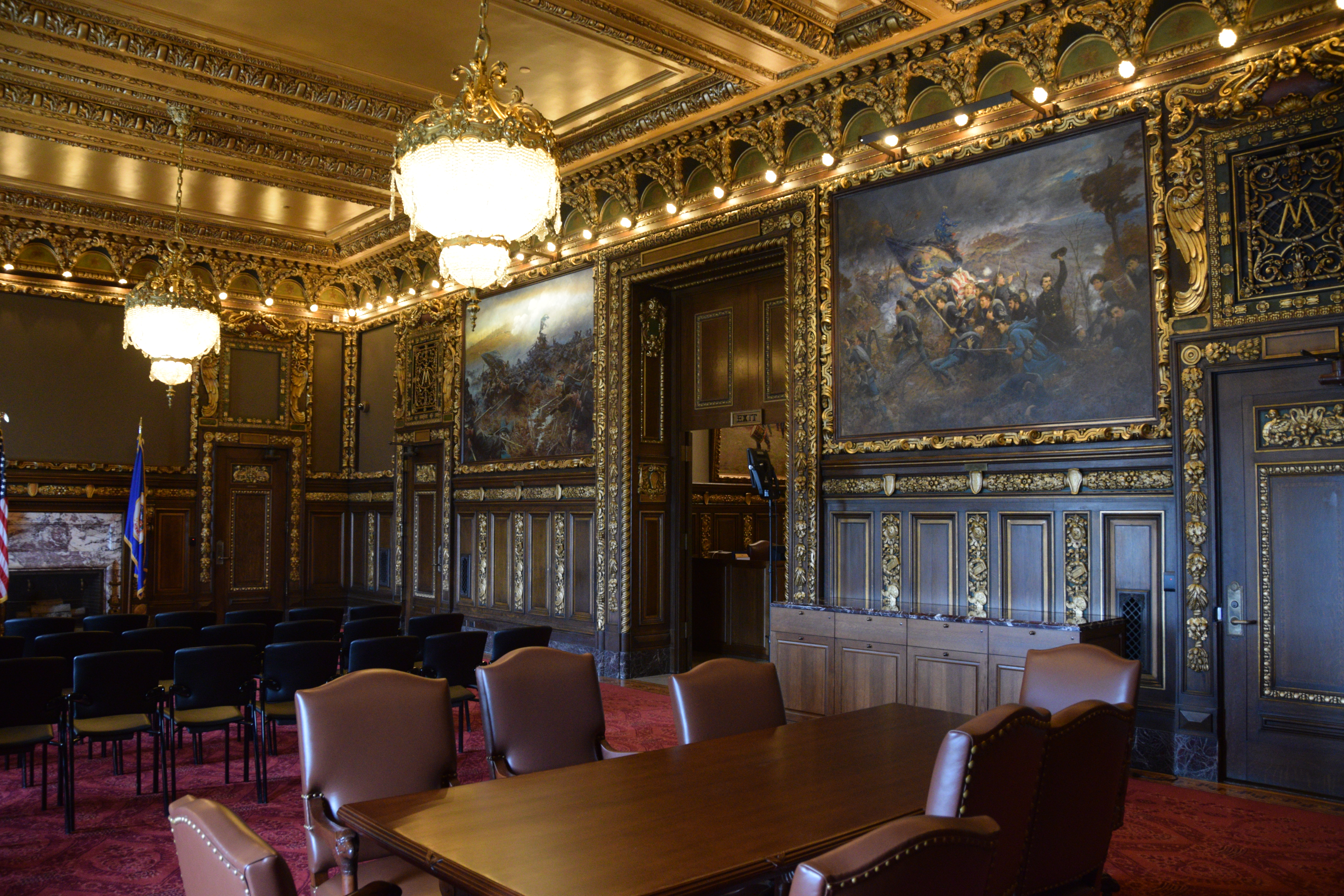
Governor's Reception Room showing Pyle's and Volk's paintings

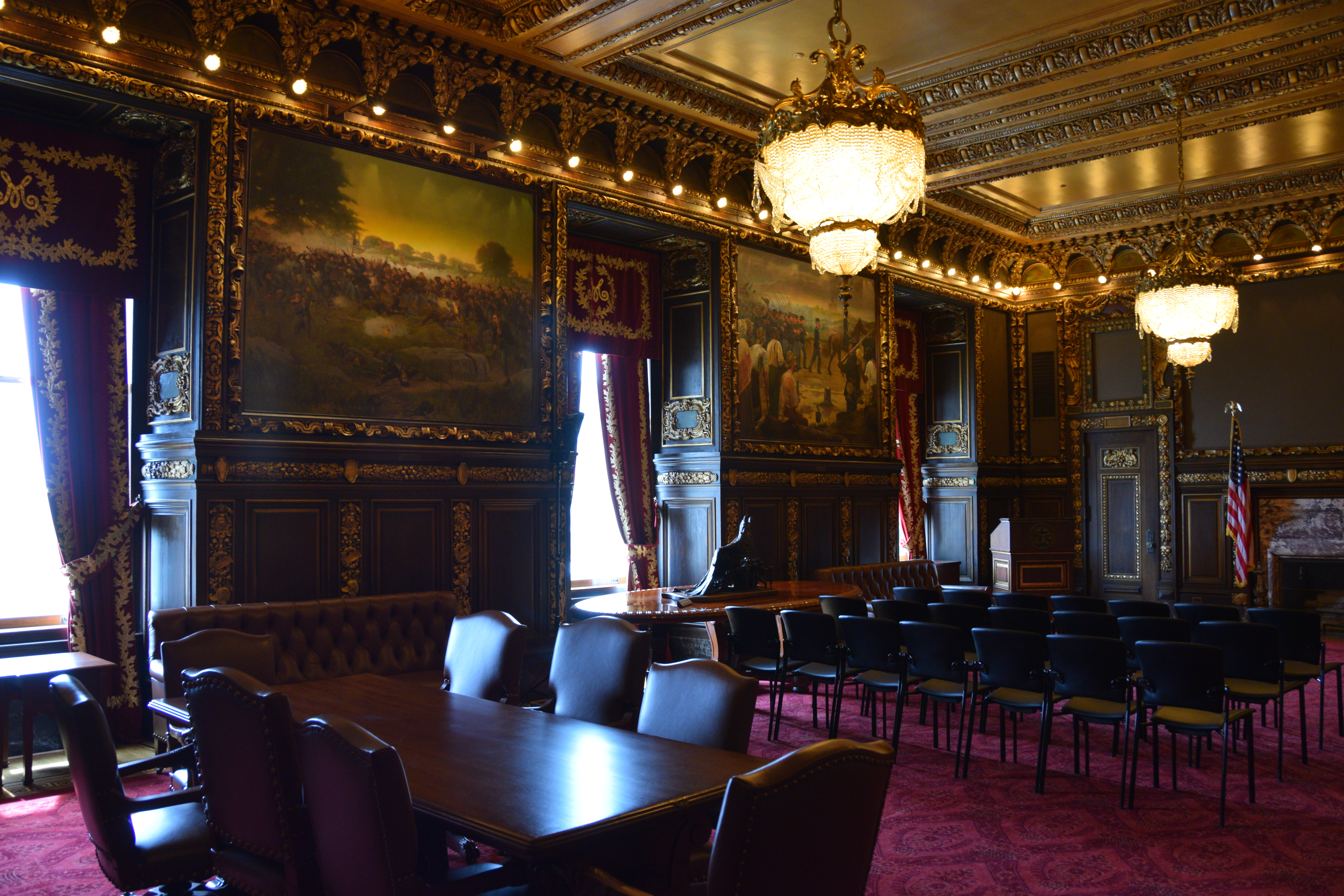
Governor's Reception Room showing Zogbaum's and Millet's paintings

In 1905, Cass Gilbert advised the Board on a series of Civil War paintings for the room including their placement, subject matter and recommended the artists, of which he critiqued their work from first contact to final installation. Gilbert prided himself in handling colors, materials, and spaces and in directing the work of decorators and designers, to create the aesthetic unity he envisioned.

Gilbert rebuffed a self-appointed committee that sought to commission its own painting of the Battle of Gettysburg for the room, in the name of artistic integrity and maintaining the cohesion of his designs. He worked quickly to arrange historical paintings for all the available spaces in the room stating, "It seems to me that if the Board does not cover the vacant spaces that somebody will get in their deadly political work later on and make that room a chamber of horrors in the name of patriotism."

Rufus F. Zogbaum, a well-known painter and illustrator of Army and Navy battle scenes he was selected by Gilbert and commissioned by the Board to paint The Battle of Gettysburg. Francis D. Millet was commissioned to do two paintings for the room, The Fourth Minnesota Entering Vicksburg and The Treaty of Traverse des Sioux. Millet at age fifteen, participated in American Civil War with the Massachusetts regiment, first as a drummer boy and then a surgical assistant. Douglas Volk was also commissioned to do two paintings, The Second Minnesota at Mission Ridge and Father Hennepin at St. Anthony Falls. Howard Pyle was disappointed when he did not receive the commission to do the battle of Missionary Ridge but was commissioned and created the most widely known painting of the six, The Battle of Nashville.

=== Later additions ===
Adjacent is the Governor's Ante Room which displays two paintings commissioned and placed after the building of the Capitol. The Third Minnesota Entering Little Rock, placed in 1910 was painted by artist, Stanley M. Arthurs who was a student of Howard Pyle and an assistant of his on larger commissions.

On the wall opposite is the painting The Fifth Minnesota at Corinth by Edwin H. Blashfield which was placed in 1912. Blashfield's painting focuses the eye on a Confederate officer, standing unarmed against the regiment's charge which was a conviction at the time that bravery could be found on both sides of the conflict.

=== Reception ===
While the reception to the paintings was positive, Civil War veterans critiqued the accuracy of the paintings. Arthurs remarked while hanging his painting, "Soldiers who took part in the event are not pleased with the painting in many respects. It is said that the blankets are not properly arranged." William Watts Folwell the University of Minnesota's first president and the president of the Minnesota Historical Society from 1924 to 1927 was not in favor of such memorials for the American Civil War and offered cautionary words, "...such memorials of a war between sister states in the American Union are not in good taste. The Roman custom of preserving no memorials of a civil war is one that America, now united forever, may properly follow."

=== Removal ===
As restoration of the works of fine art occurred during the Capitol renovation from 2013 to 2017, discussions occurred over some paintings in the building that featured controversial depictions of Native Americans. A series of public input meetings were held around the state to gather feedback and consider options for new policies regarding art in the renovated building.

Former Governor Mark Dayton questioned the need for many of the Civil War paintings and the tradition of hanging the portraits of former governors, saying, "To me, this space should be about Minnesota and all of its elements and its increasing diversity". Despite his objections, the Minnesota Historical Society executive council voted unanimously to reinstall the works, saying it was more important to maintain the room's historical integrity instead of diversifying the representations of Minnesota.

While the Civil War paintings remained, two of the paintings in the Governor's Reception Room, Volk's Father Hennepin Discovering the Falls of St. Anthony, and Millet's Treaty of Traverse des Sioux, were called out for relocation following public input by the art subcommittee of the Capitol Preservation Commission because of the paintings long-criticized, inaccurate portrayals of Native Americans and due to their prominent placement in a room where they served as a backdrop during state events and press conferences. In 2016 the decision was to relocate the two paintings to a new space on the Capitol's 3rd floor where expanded interpretation could be given. In addition to the two paintings in the Governor's Reception Room, two other paintings located elsewhere in the Capitol, criticized for their portrayals of Native Americans, Attack on New Ulm by Anton Gag and the Eighth Minnesota at the Battle of Ta-Ha-Kouty (Killdeer Mountain) by Carl L. Boeckman, were removed from the Capitol altogether as they were acquired after the capitol was constructed and were not original to the building.

Paintings in Governor's Reception Room and Anteroom

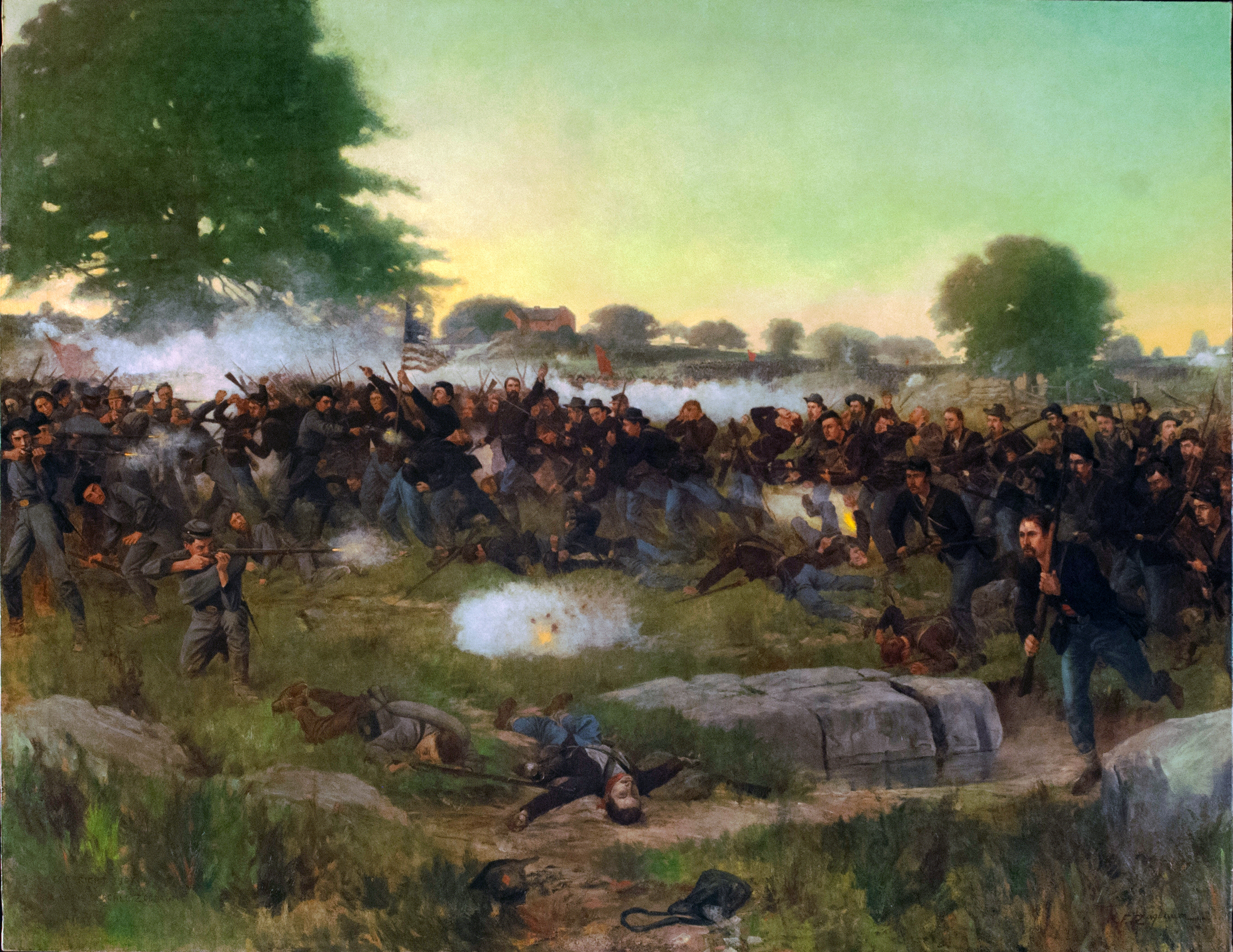
The Battle of Gettysburg by Fairchild Zogbaum

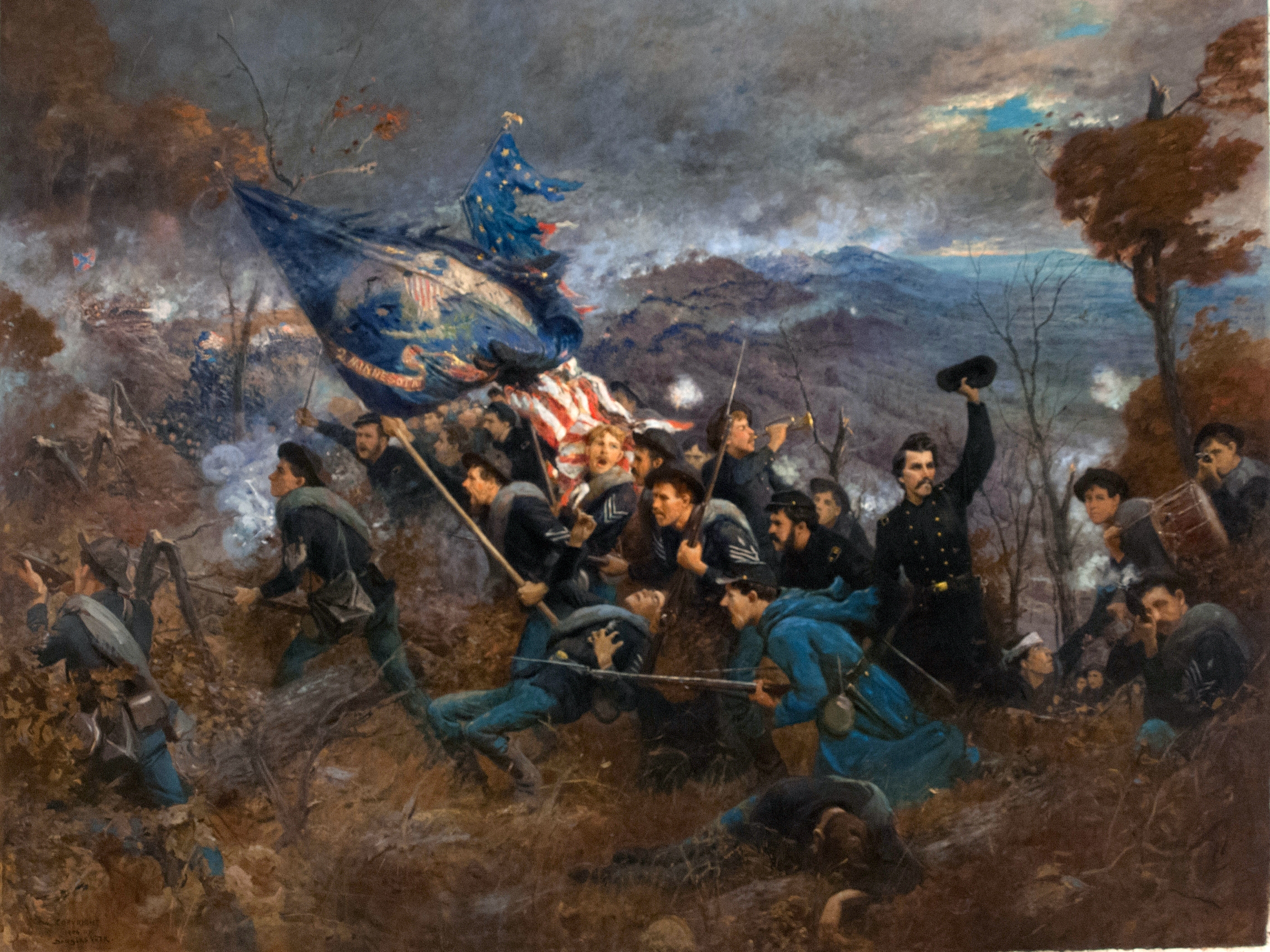
The Second Minnesota Regiment at Missionary Ridge, by Douglas Volk

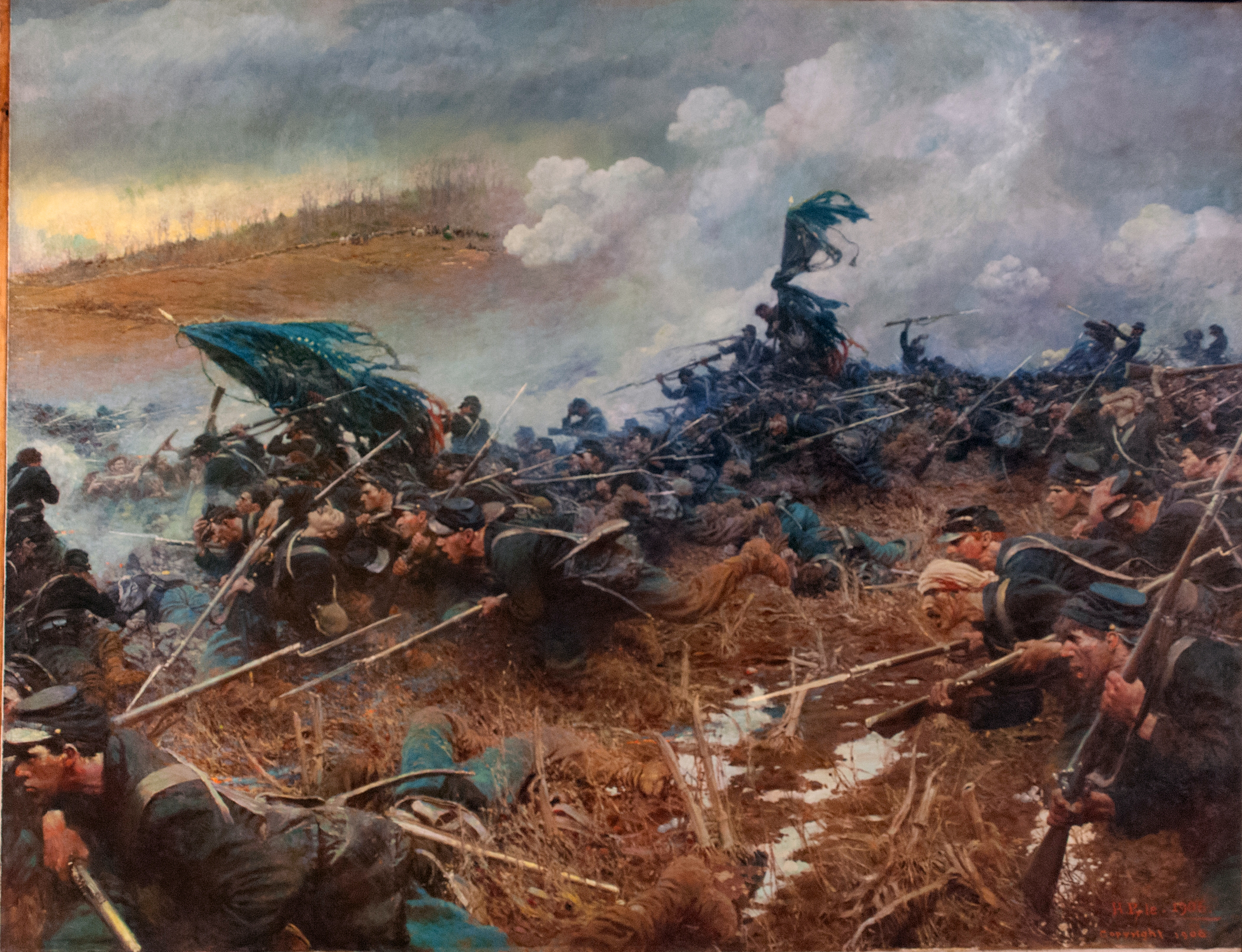
The Battle of Nashville, by Howard Pyle

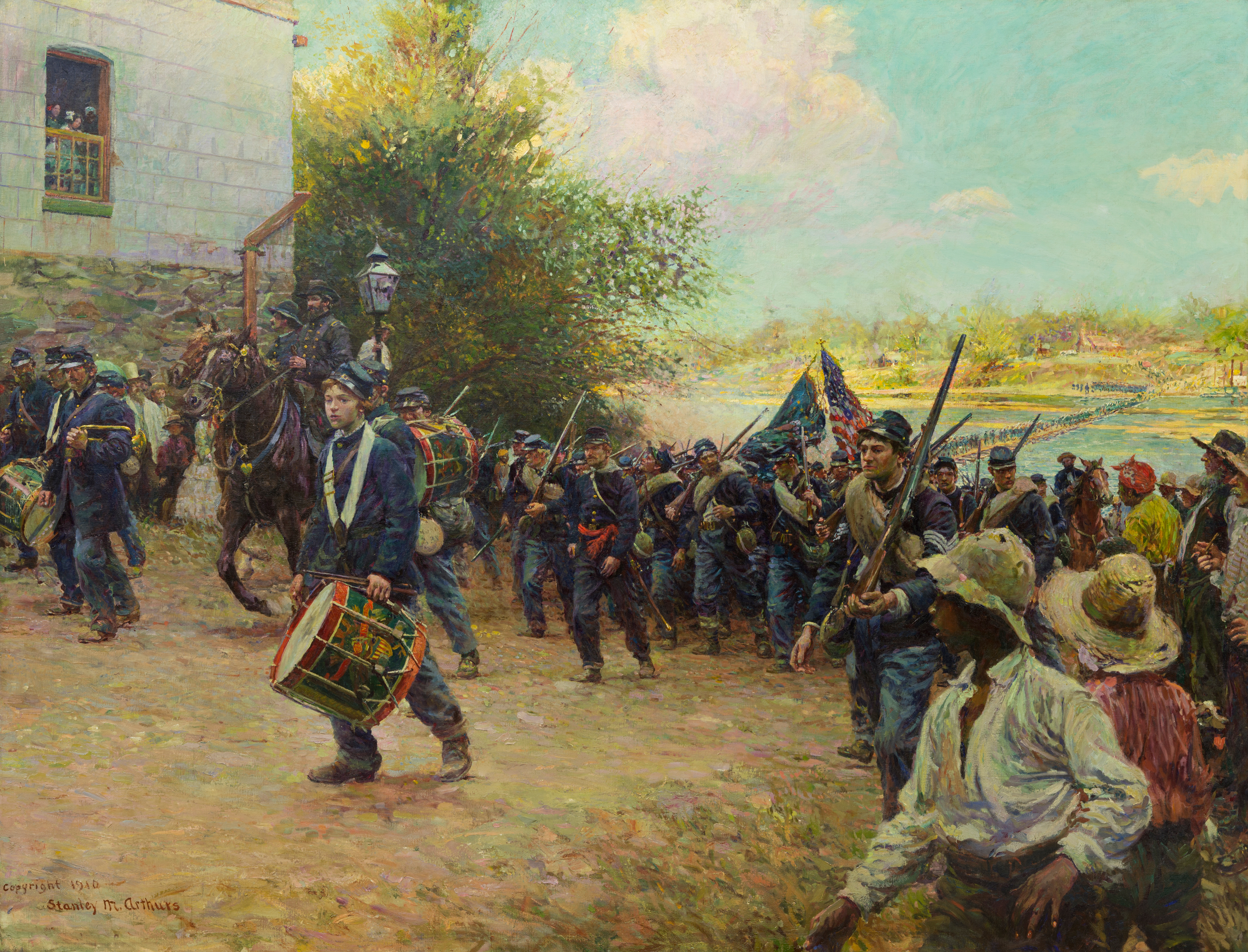
The Third Minnesota Entering Little Rock by Stanley M. Arthurs

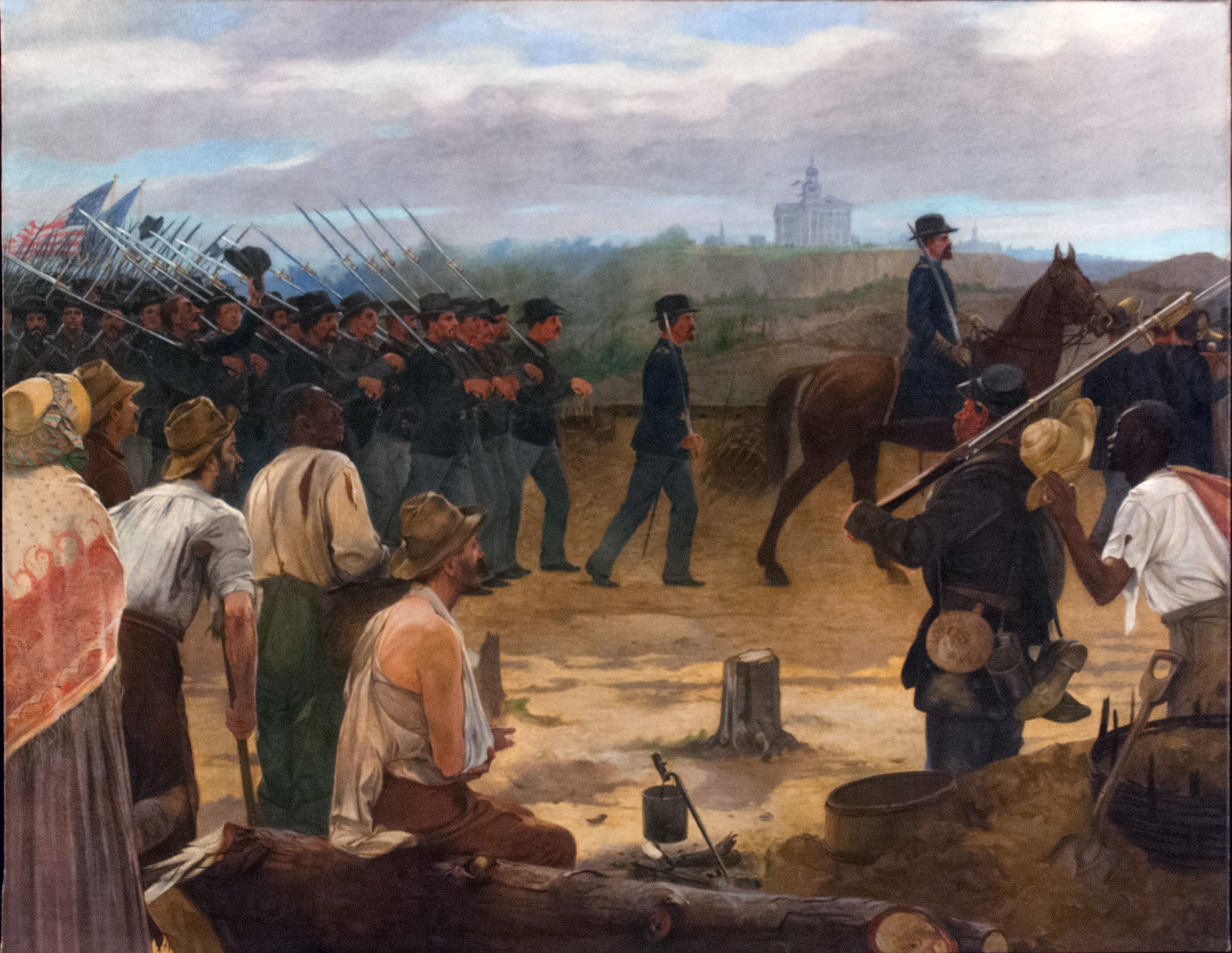
The Fourth Minnesota Entering Vicksburg, by Francis D. Millet

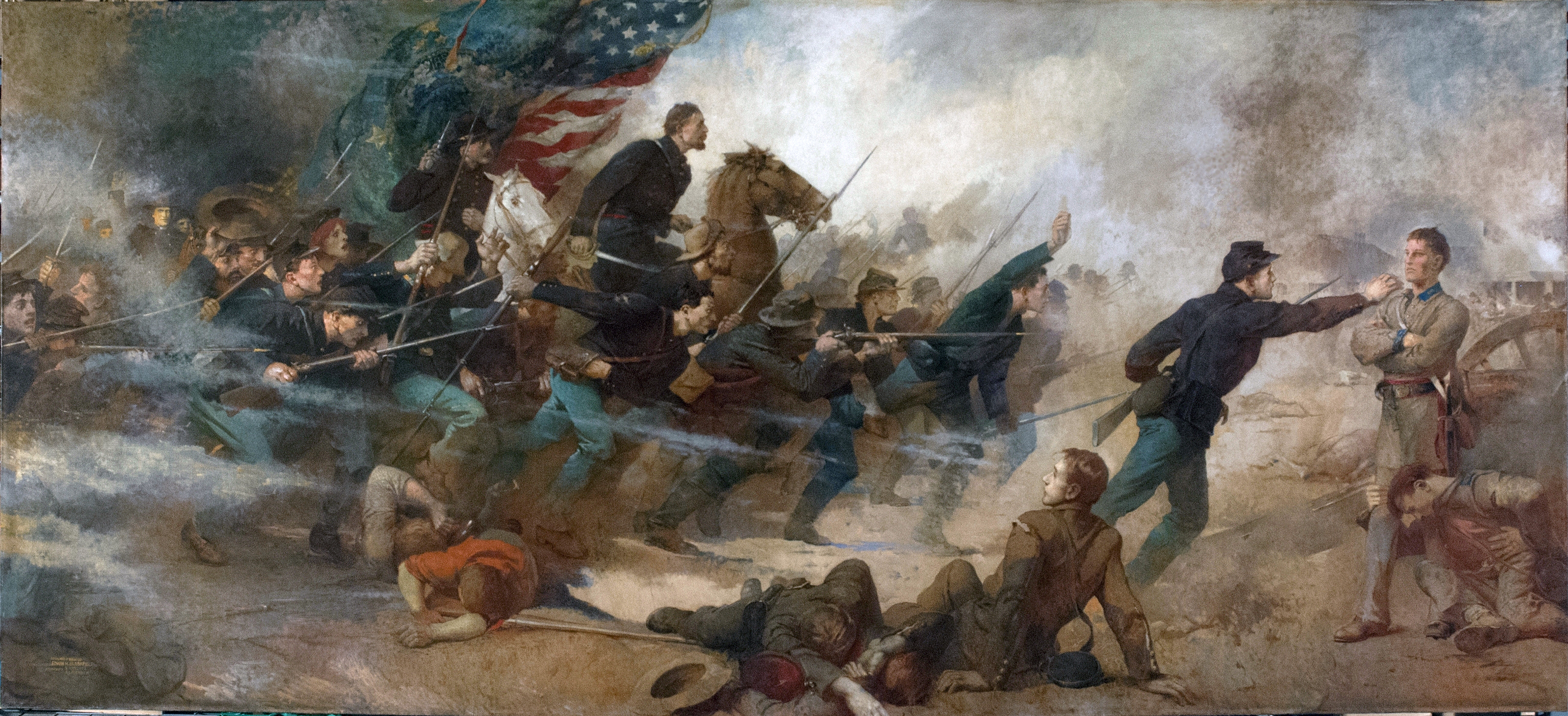
The Fifth Minnesota at Corinth, by Edwin H. Blashfield
Removed paintings

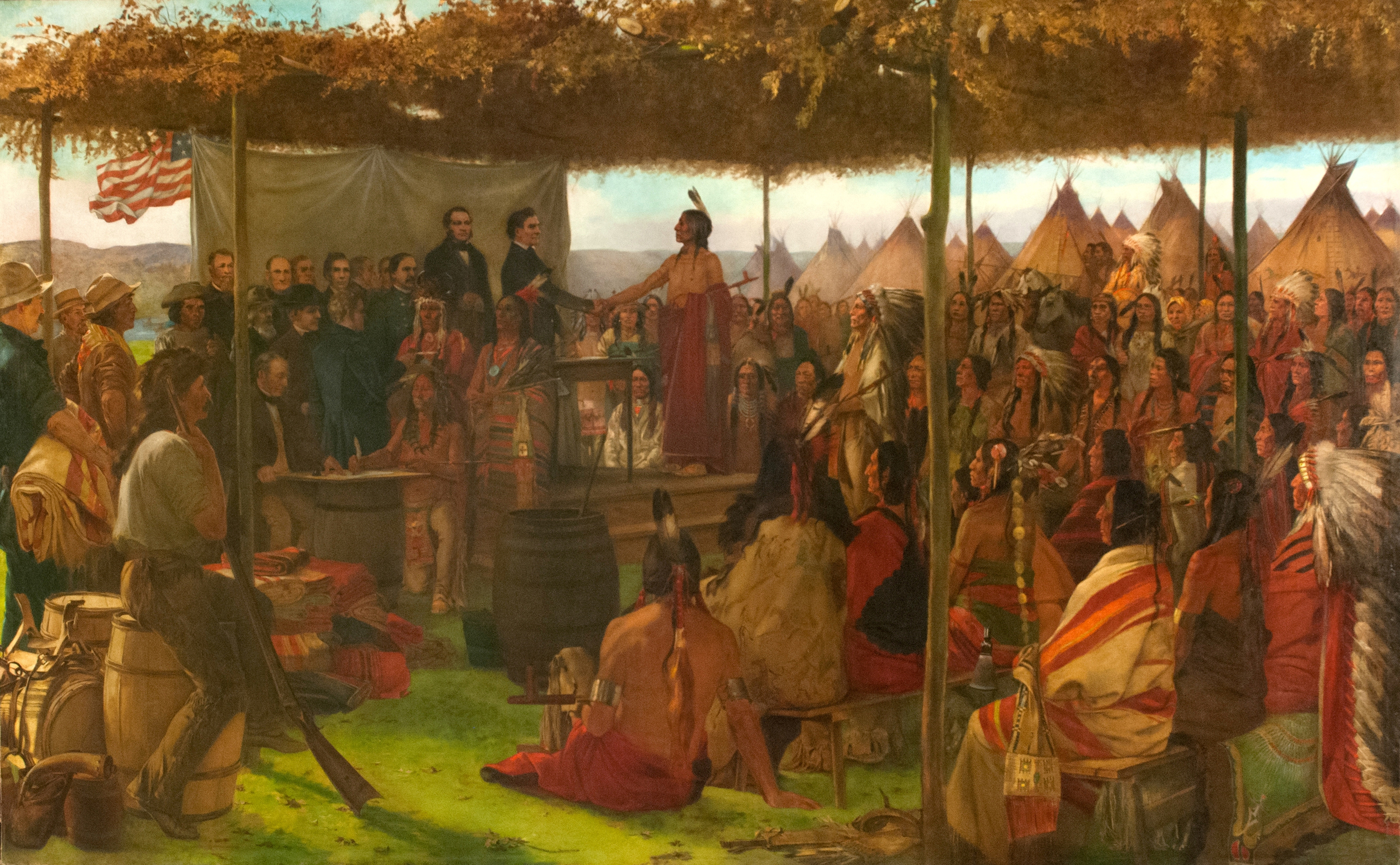
Treaty of Traverse des Sioux, by Francis D. Millet

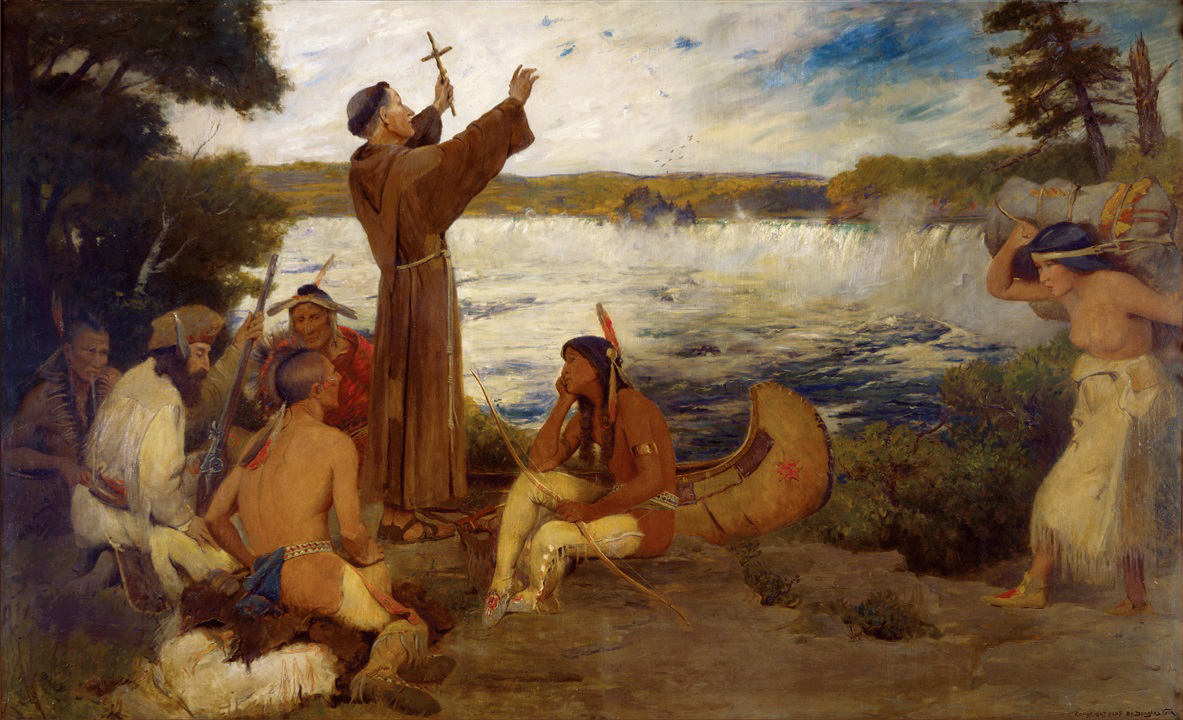
Father Hennepin Discovering the Falls of St. Anthony, by Douglas Volk

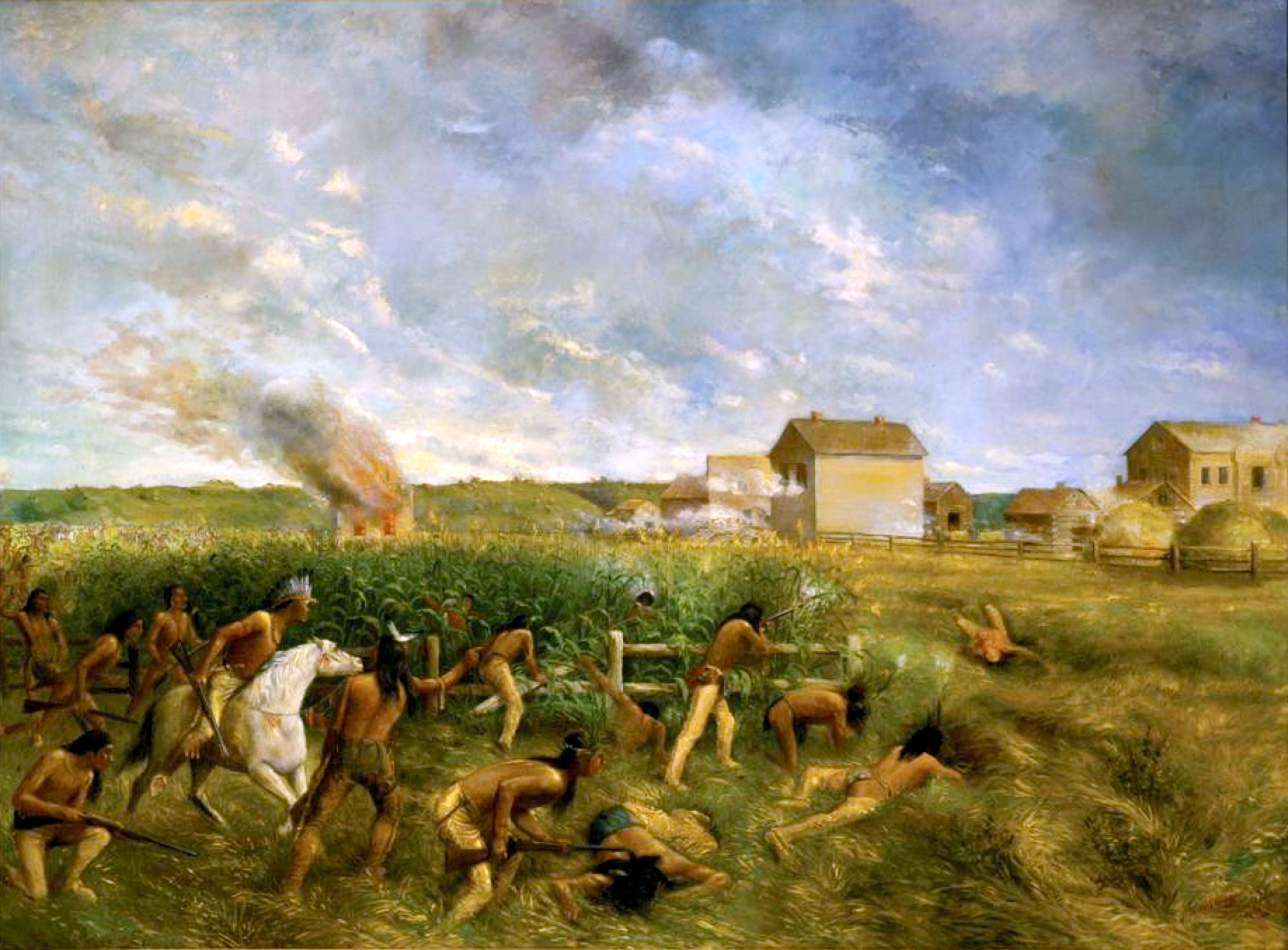
Attack on New Ulm, by Anton Gag

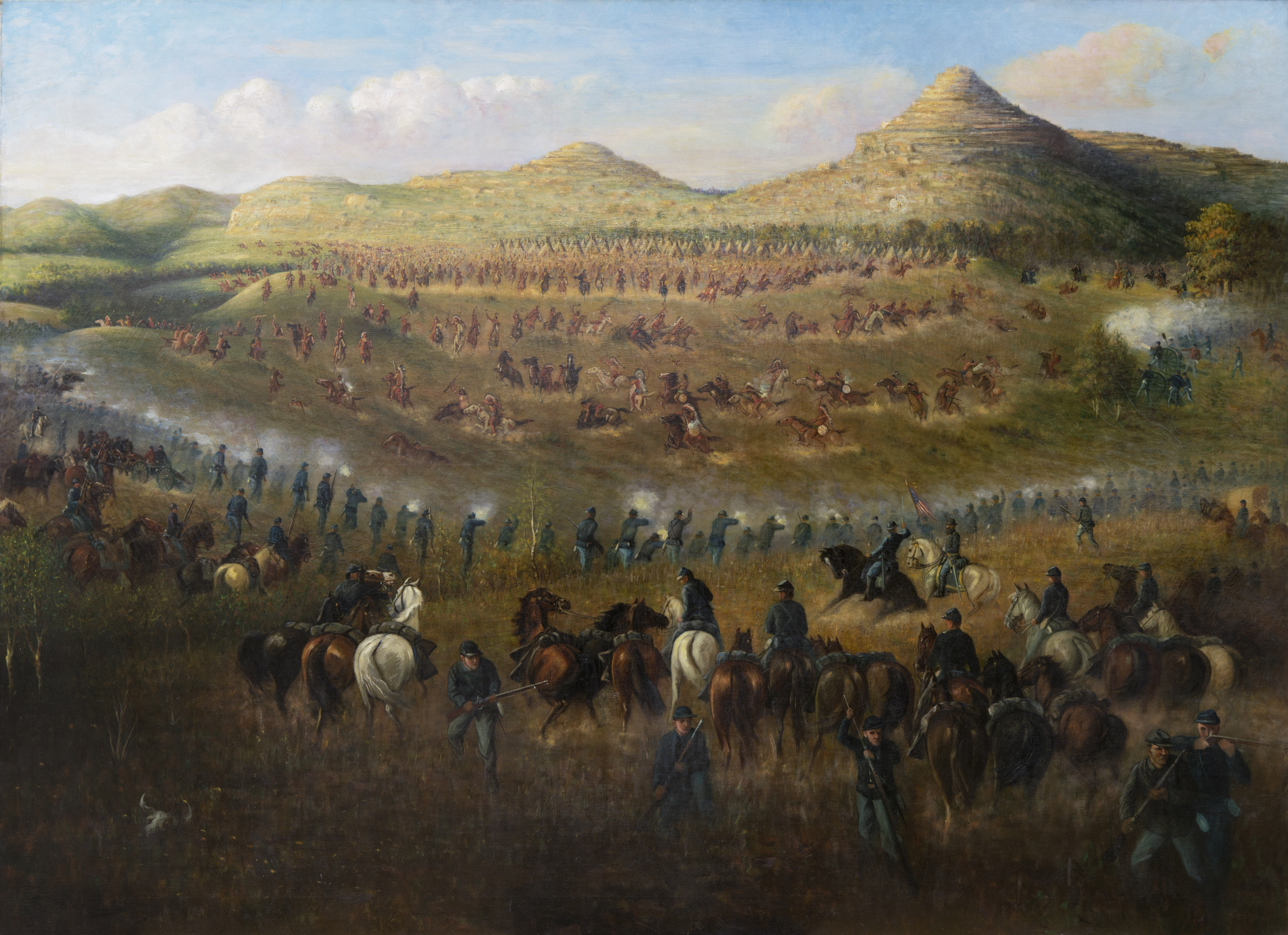
Eighth Minnesota at the Battle of Ta-Ha-Kouty (Killdeer Mountain) by Carl L. Boeckman

== Grand Staircase ==
=== Lunettes ===
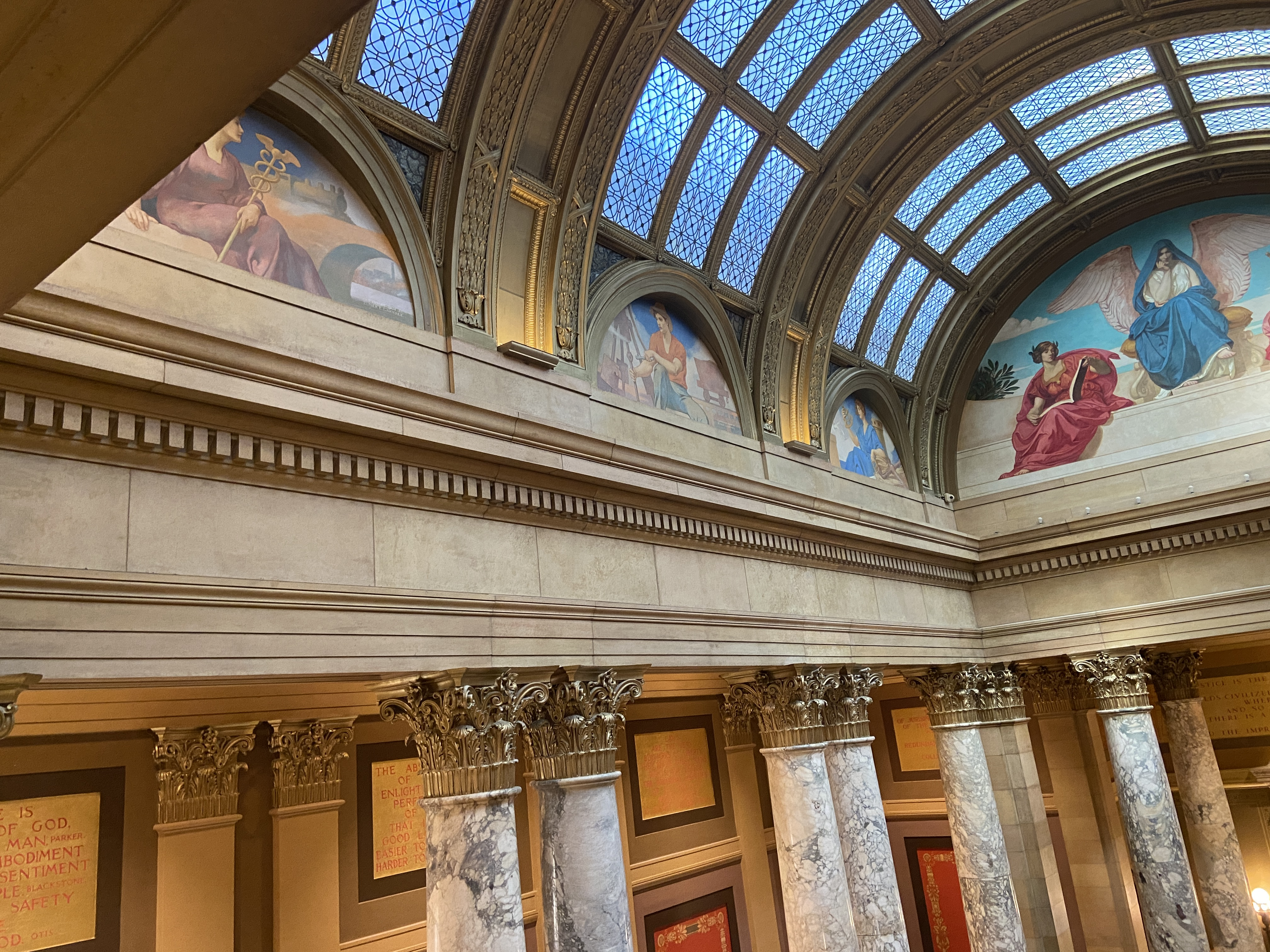
Staircase lunettes

In a common division of labor for turn-of-the-19th century mural projects, the grant staircase lunettes were designed by Elmer Garnsey and painted by his assistant Arthur R. Willett. Each of the twelve smaller lunettes at the base of the skylight vault on either side of the east and west grand staircases depicts an occupation or industry found in early Minnesota. Each grouping of three lunettes has two with a woman on either side of one with a man. Most, but not all of the women are depicted as deities. A background of blue sky is carried throughout the series with their colors echoing the red panels of the walls below. The lunettes above the east grand staircase illustrate images reflecting commerce, mining, shipping, stonecutting, and livestock farming. The lunettes above the west grand staircase illustrate images reflecting agriculture, fur trading, hunting, dairy farming, logging, and horticulture.

Cass Gilbert had originally considered paintings of historical subject matter for the lunettes over the grand stair halls. That changed when the Governor's Reception Room was upscaled from a more modest room to one including six large paintings that span 200 years of the area's history by notable artists of the time.

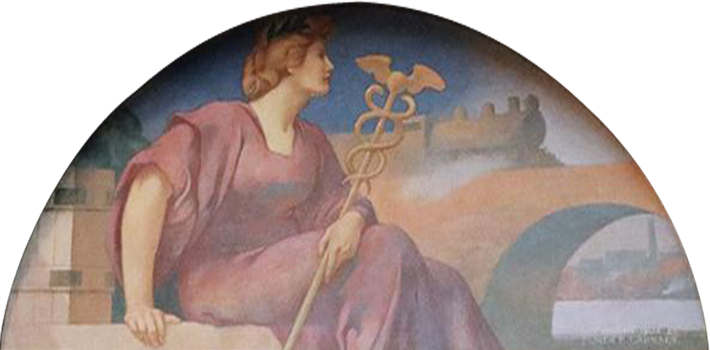
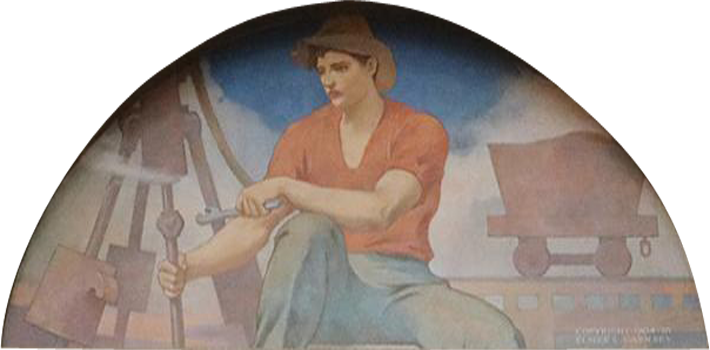
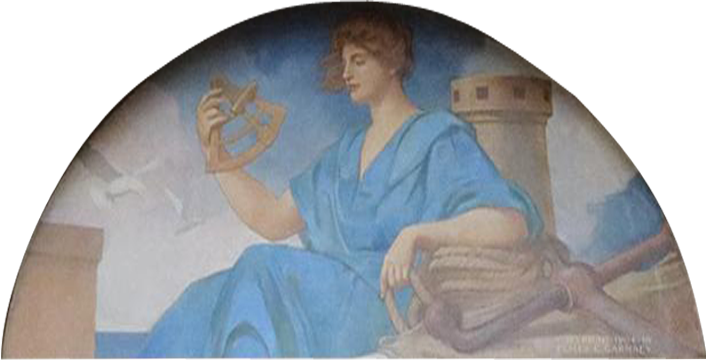
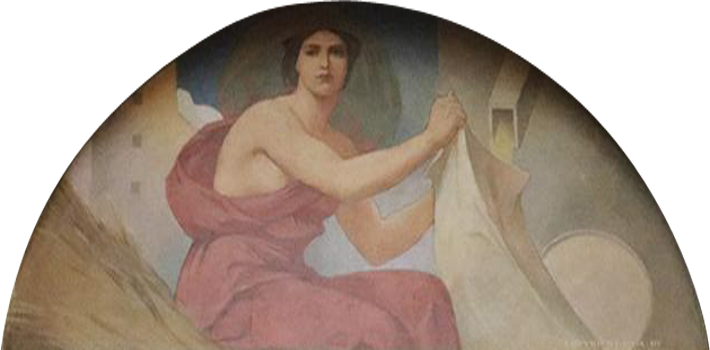
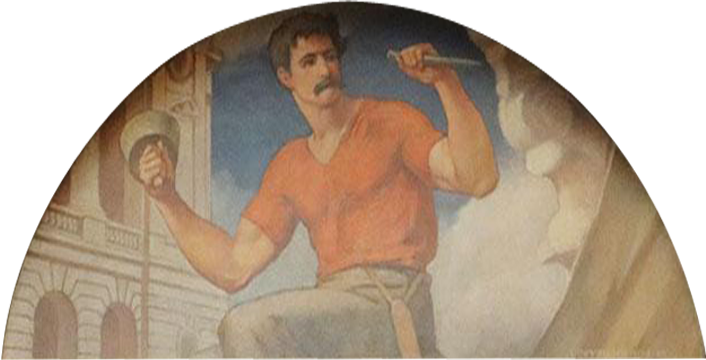
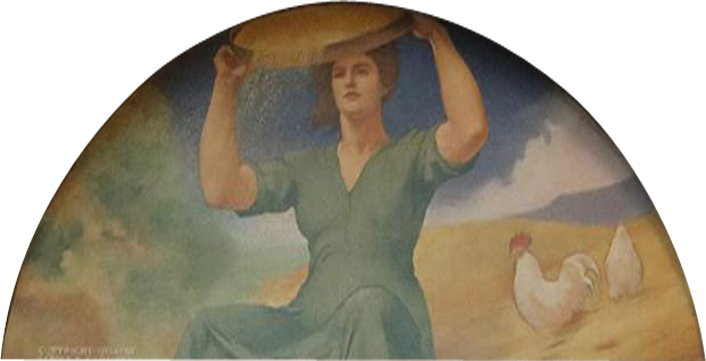
Lunettes above the East Grand Staircase. Clockwise from upper left: commerce, mining, shipping, milling, stonecutting, livestock farming.
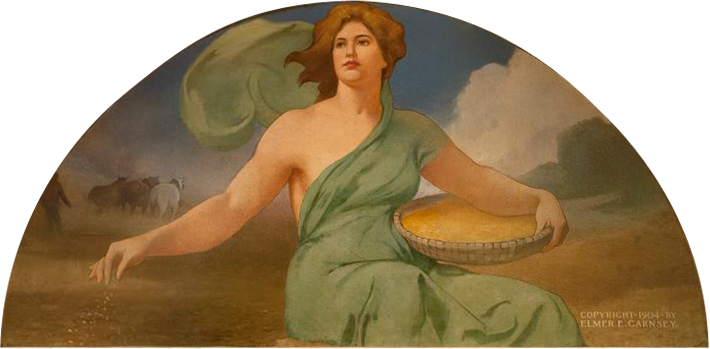
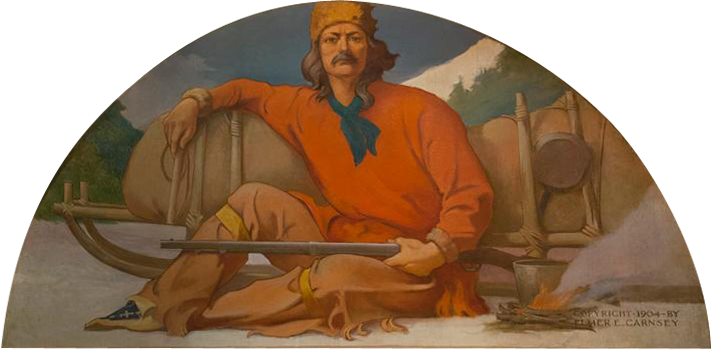
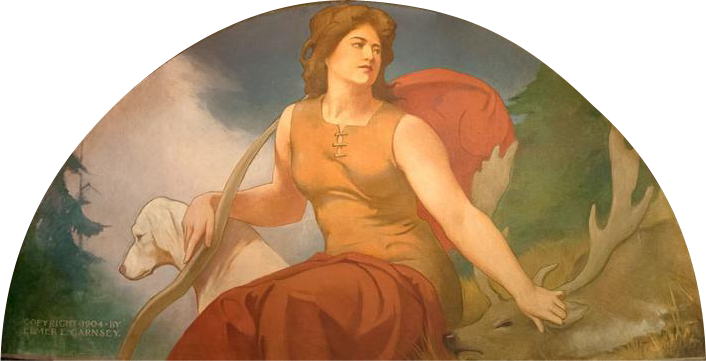
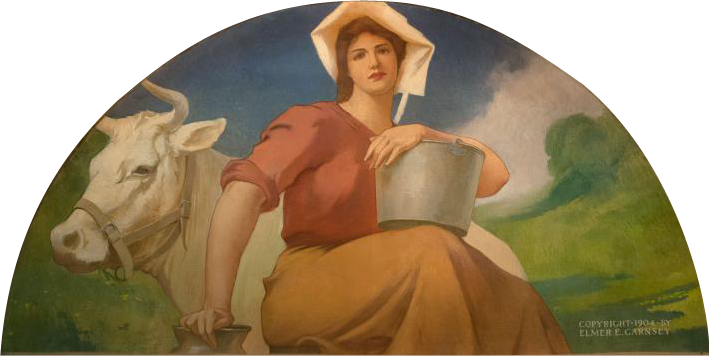
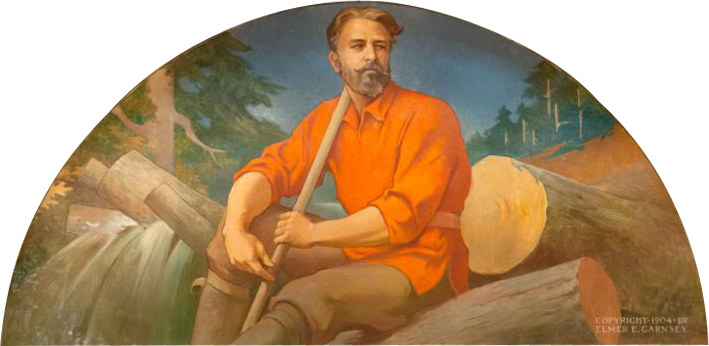
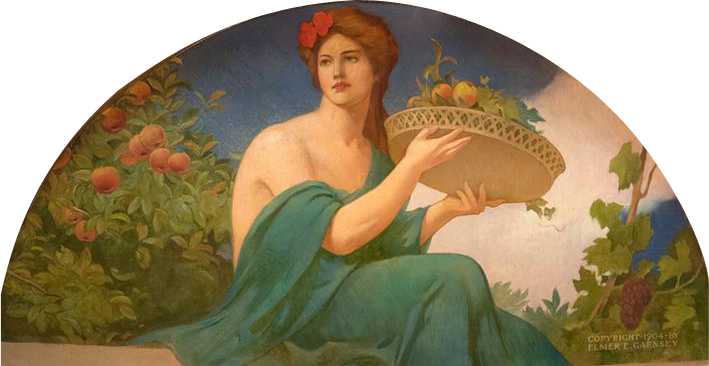
Lunettes above the West Grand Staircase. Clockwise from upper left: agriculture, fur trading, hunting, dairy farming, logging, horticulture.

=== Contemplative Spirit of the East ===
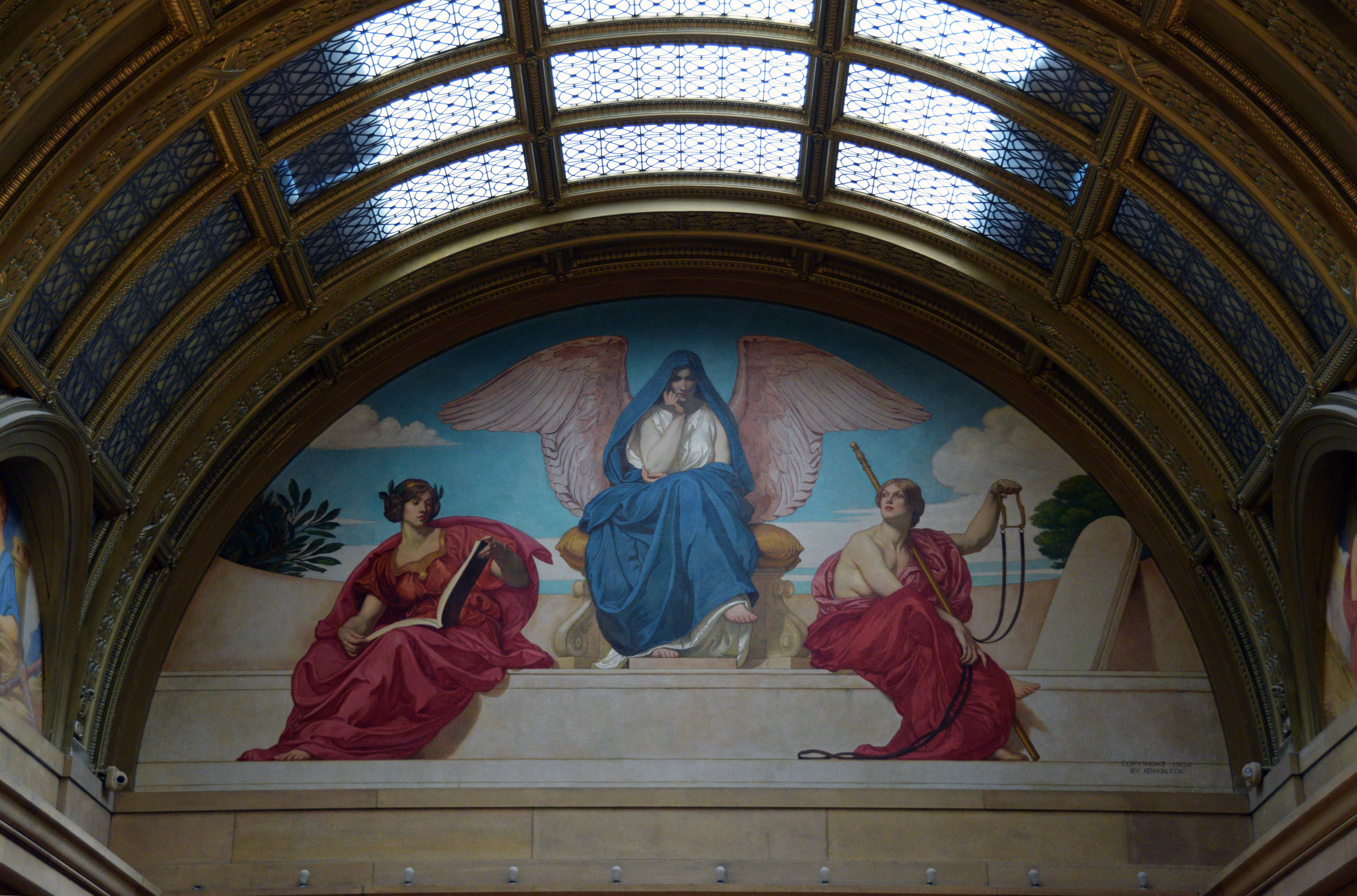
Contemplative Spirit of the East

At the end of the skylight over the east grand staircase leading into the Supreme Court chambers is the mural Contemplative Spirit of the East, the theme of the mural prepares the visitor for the Supreme Court chambers just beyond it. Kenyon Cox painted The Contemplative Spirit of the East as a trio of women in classical draperies. "The composition as a whole is meant to form a fitting introduction to the decorations of the Supreme Court, which depict the development of Law," the artist wrote. The figures sit on a bench painted to match the color and lines of the Kasota stone beam below. State Capitol historian Thomas O'Sullivan writes, "His winged central figure is angel, madonna, and Thinker all in one." To her right sits "Letters," with an open book. The figure of "Law," is at her left, holding a bridle and staff, symbols of restraint. She sits next to two blank stone tablets suggesting LaFarge's mural of Moses in the Supreme Court chamber.

Evolution of Contemplative Spirit of the East

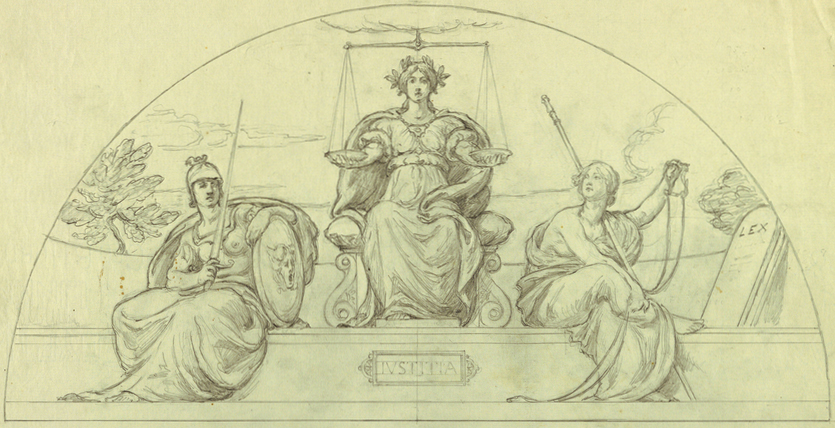
Drawing, Study for lunette, Justice Enthroned Between Law and Order (1st version)

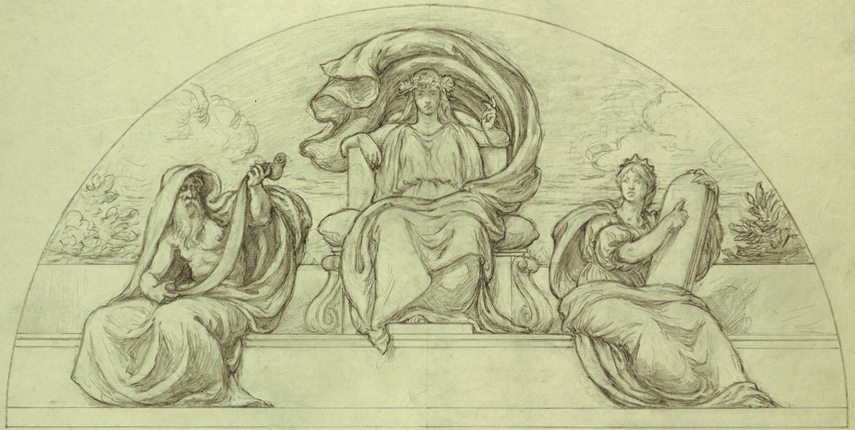
Study Drawing for lunette, Justice Enthroned Between Law and Order (2nd or Alternate Version)

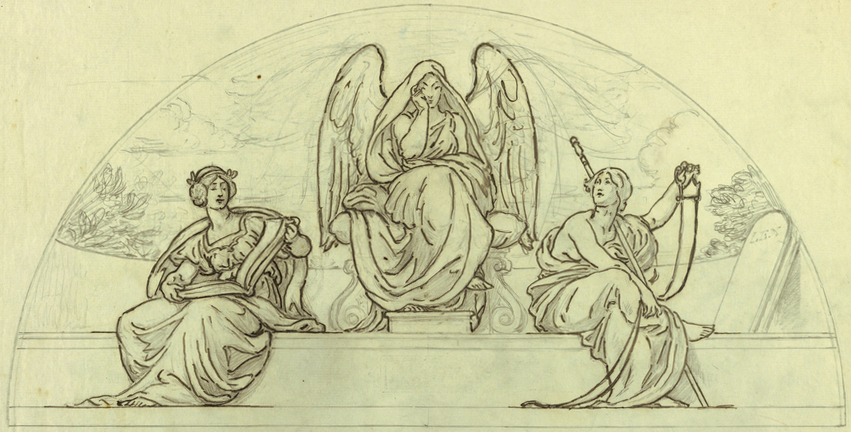
Drawing, Study for lunette, Justice Enthroned Between Law and Order (3rd or final version)

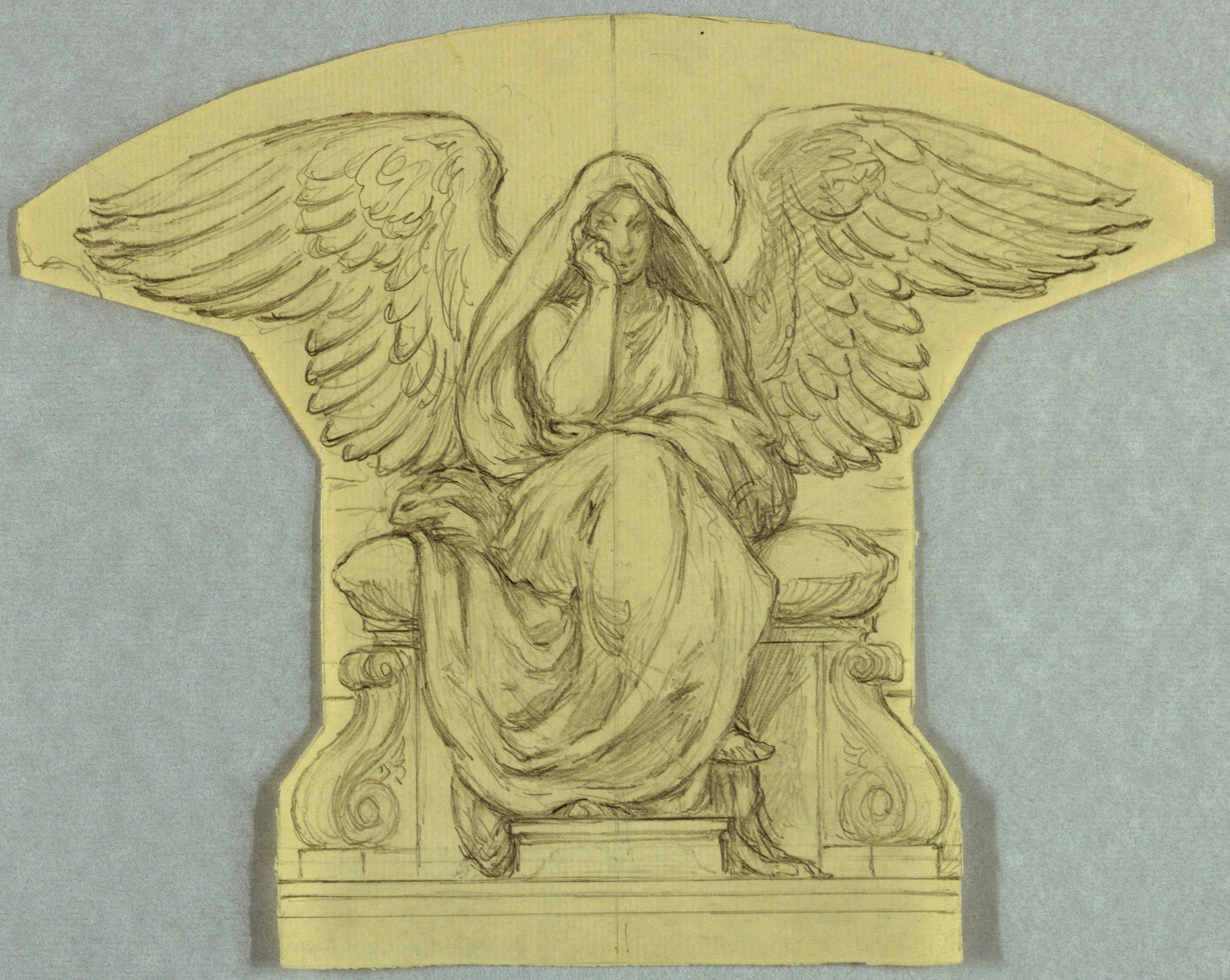
Drawing, contemplation, study for Contemplative Spirit of the East

=== The Sacred Flame (Yesterday, Today and Tomorrow) ===
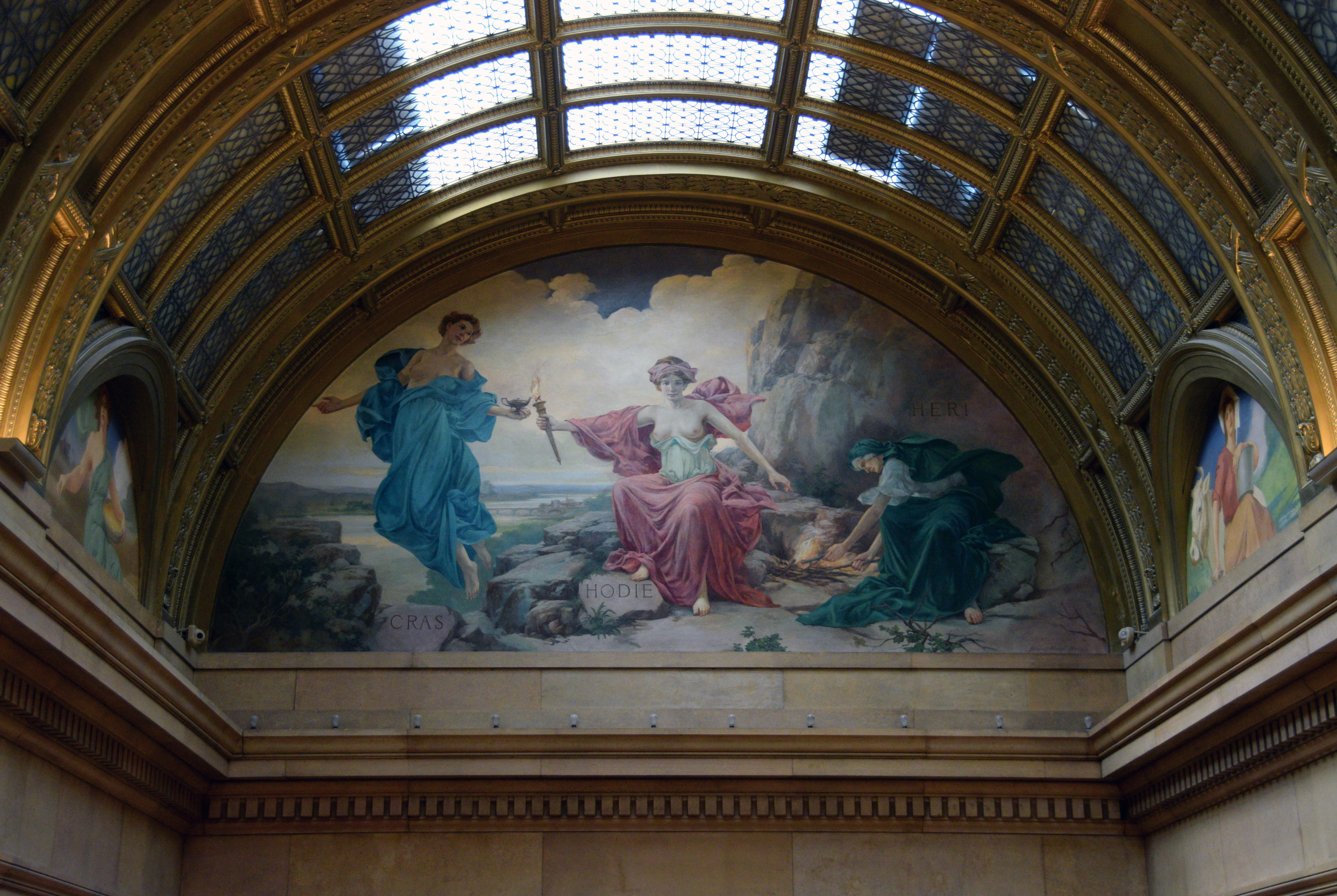
The Sacred Flame

In the west grand staircase is Henry Walker's mural, The Sacred Flame (Yesterday, Today and Tomorrow). The painting has a Triple Goddess – maiden, mother, crone motif, with an elderly woman on the right maintaining a fire, a central female figure passing a torch to a young woman who is holding a lamp on the left. The figures are titled with their Latin names, Heri (yesterday), Hodie (today), and Cras (tomorrow). Gilbert described the mural to the Commissioners: "A figure of Old Age bending over and conserving the embers of the fire of knowledge, passes the flame on to Maturity who in turn ignites or lights the torch of Youth, illustrating poetically the idea of the progress that is supposed to be typical of the West gaining knowledge from the past and transmitting it to the future."

==== Changes to the mural ====
In a comprehensive restoration of the Capitol and its artwork in 2013-2017, it was discovered that there were multiple alterations to the mural. The conservators working on the Walker mural determined it to be about 95% repainted and suggested that much of the repainting could have been done as WPA work during a 1935 restoration as well as from a restoration in 1958. It is unknown how much of the original painting remains. The repainted mural changed the concept of the artwork from an ethereal setting to heavy a busy landscape.

In determining possible causes for overpainting of the original Walker mural it was theorized that the thinness and dilution of Walker's paint and the extensive use by of unskilled restorers or decorators in the 1935 and 1955 restorations of inappropriately tough oil-based varnishes throughout the Capitol resulted in the mural being simply repainted.

Due to Walker's original painting technique being more thin and more soluble than the much heavier repaint, the conservators not believe the heavy repaint can be removed without unacceptable additional damage to the remaining thin original at this time and that is conceivable that some years in the future, conservators may be able to remove the repaint safely with improved conservation technologies.

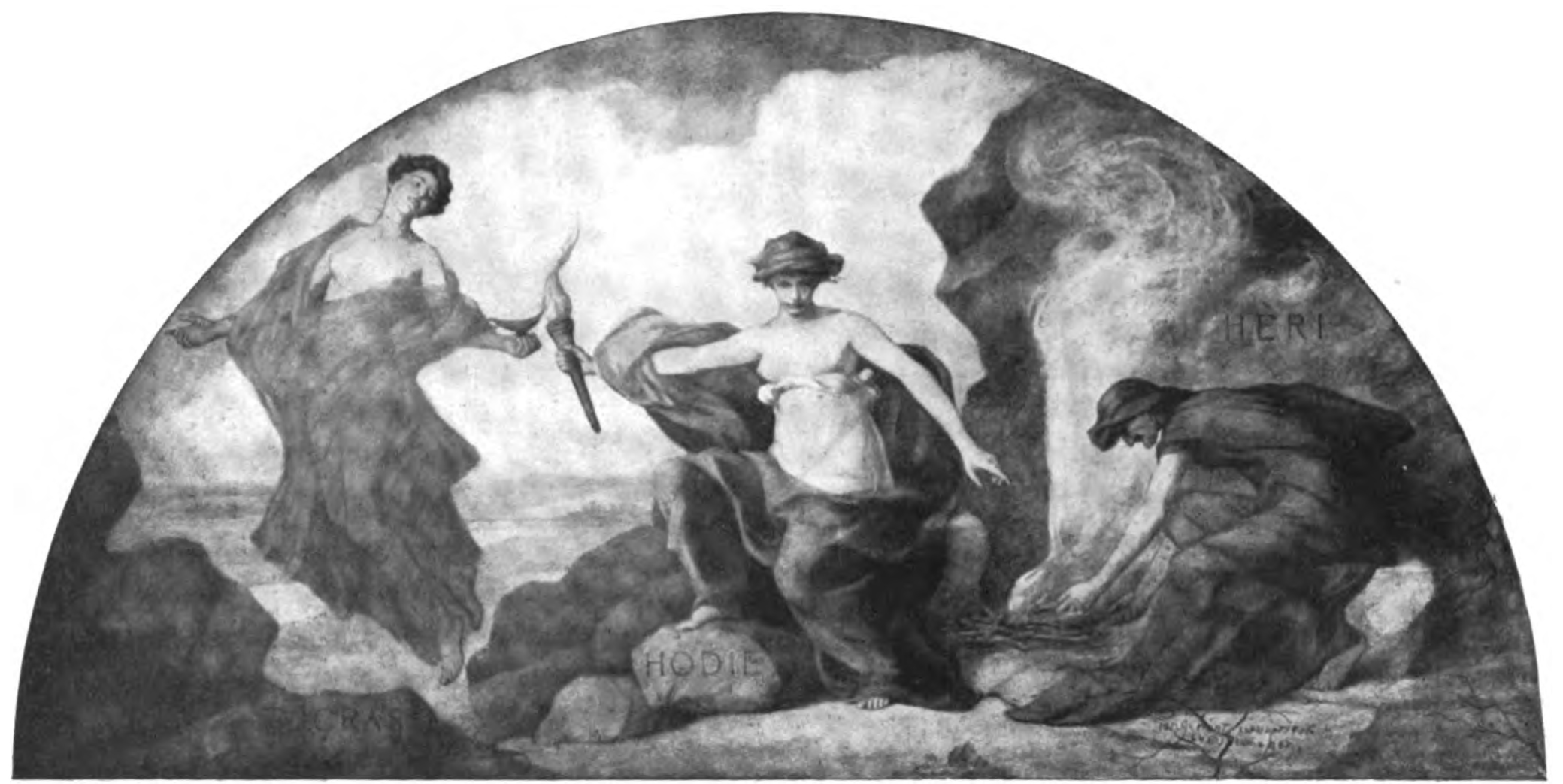
original

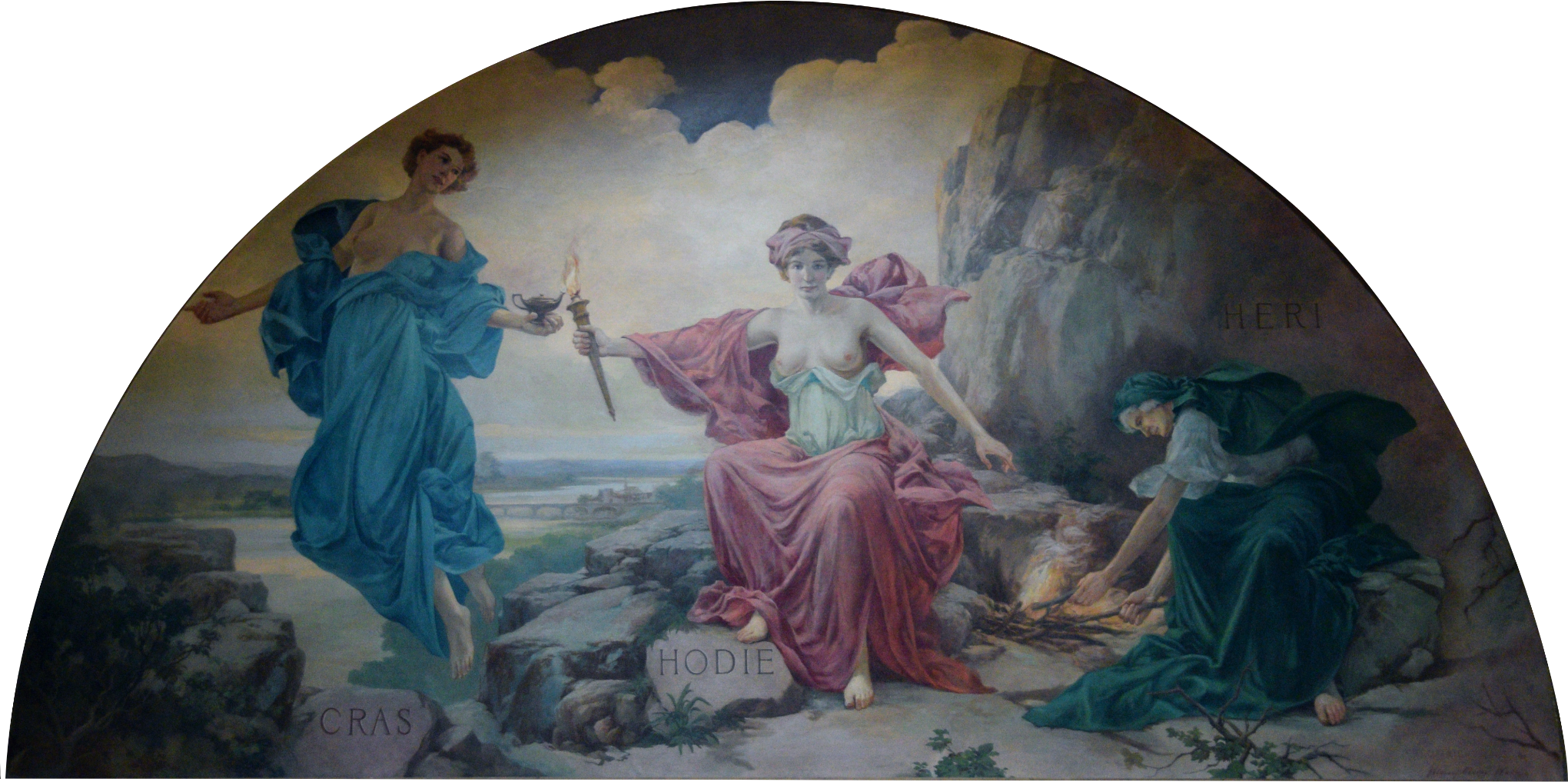
overpainted

Mural, left to right: Original from 1907 publication; Current mural in overpainted state

== Supreme Court Chamber murals ==
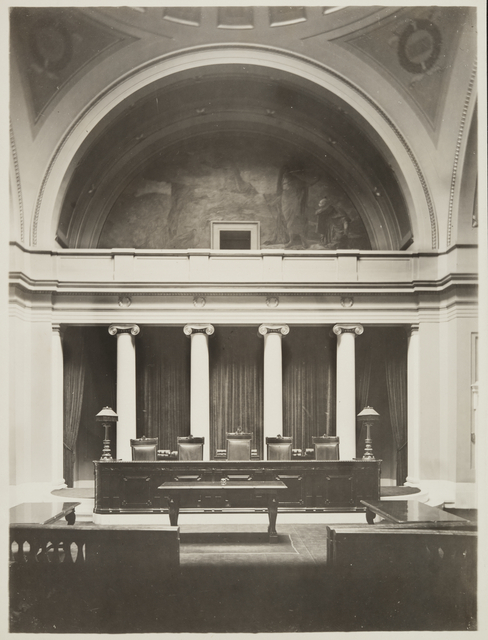
Moral and Divine Law mural showing doorway, 1907

Similar to the other murals in the Capitol, the four murals painted by John La Farge in the Supreme Court Chambers are allegorical, however, La Farge differs significantly from the other murals in the Capitol in that his subject matter is selected to illustrate four key moments in the history of law. The first lunette directly over the justices' bench, The Moral and Divine Law, depicts Moses on Mount Sinai and represents human conscience and divine law: the lunette above the entrance to the courtroom, titled The Relation of the Individual to the State, illustrates a moment in Plato's Republic where Socrates is at the home of Cephalus, debating concepts of justice. The south mural, titled The Adjustment of the Conflicting Interests, shows Raymond VI, Count of Toulouse taking an oath before the bishop and magistrate of his city, and reflects on the relationships between the citizen, the church, and the state. The north mural, The Recording of the Precedents, shows Confucius collating and transcribing documents to emphasize the importance of the past and of precedents.

In The Recording of the Precedents, La Farge asked his friend Okakura Kakuzō to help him inscribe Chinese characters on one of the scrolls. The characters actually read "First the white, and then the color on the top"—perhaps a mischievous reference to the process of painting of a mural, with color studies painted on top of a black and white cartoon. It also is possible that the comment may have been directed at the Board of Commissioners, who held back a paycheck for La Farge due to disagreement regarding the artist's process and completion of deadlines.

The mural Moral and Divine Law was modified probably in the 1930s. A doorway around which the lunette had been installed was enclosed and the mural was then painted to blend into the new composition.

Supreme Court Chamber murals

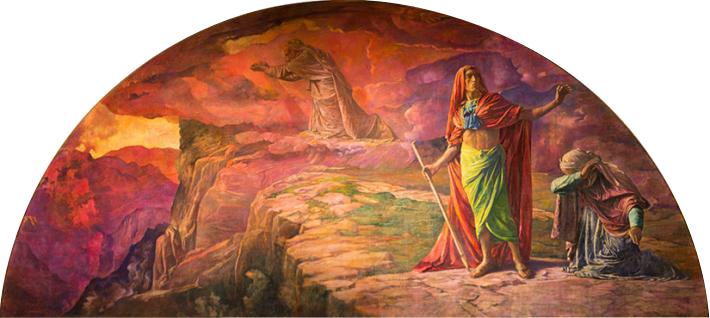
Moral and Divine Law

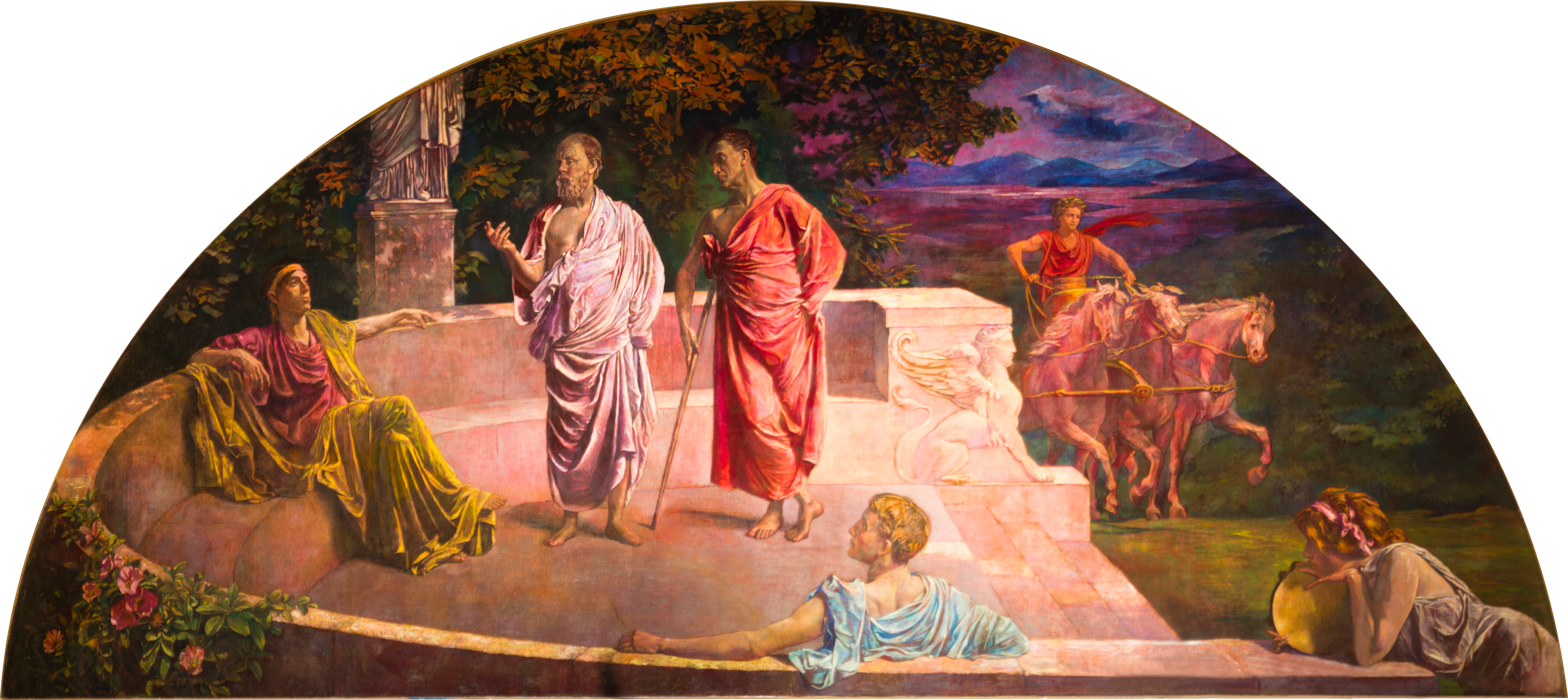
The Relation of the Individual to the State

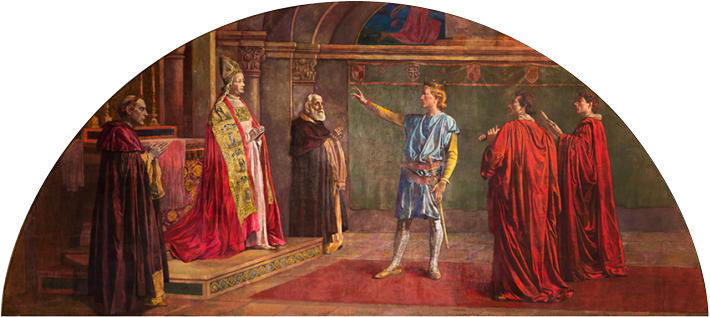
The Adjustment of Conflicting Interests

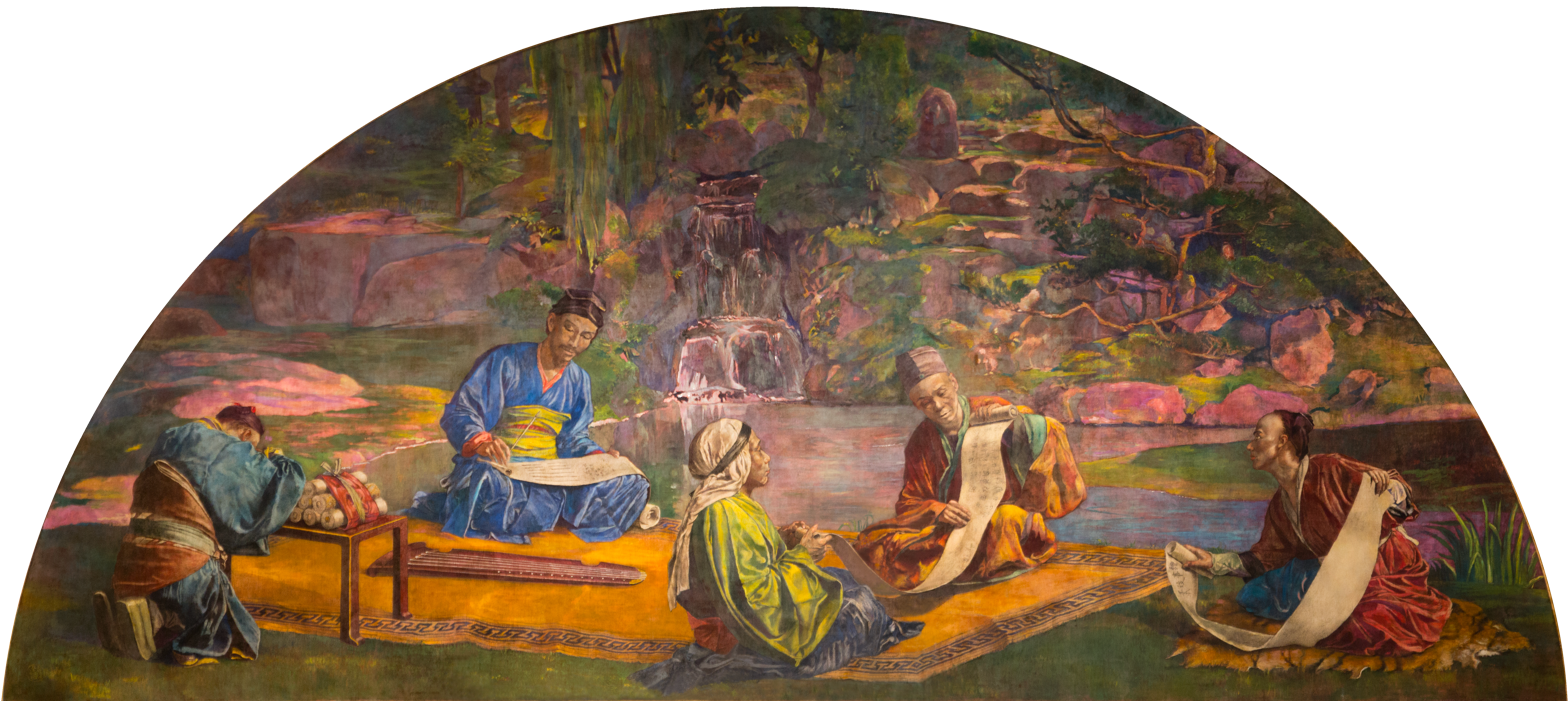
The Recording of Precedents

== Minnesota House Chamber ==
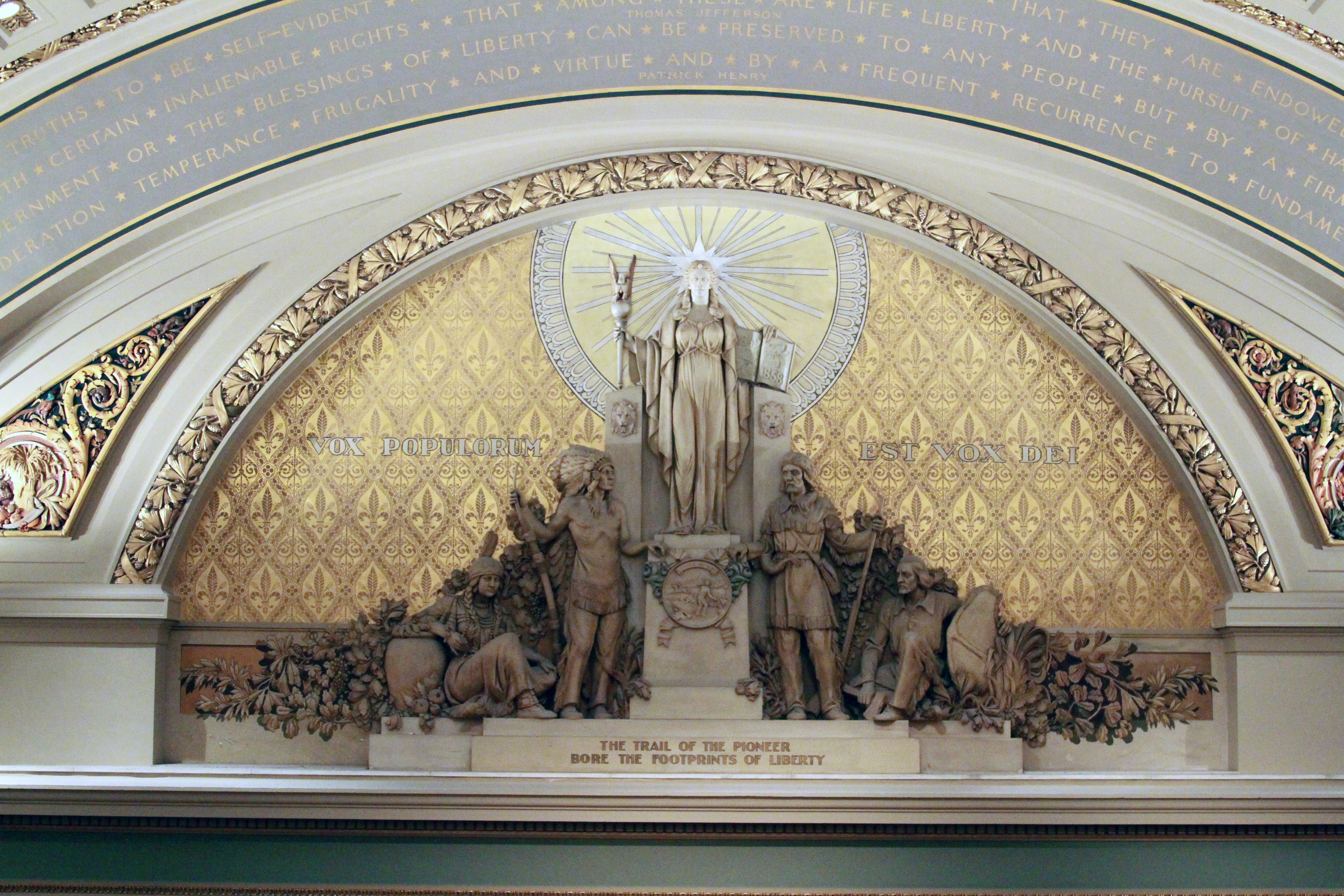
Minnesota Spirit of Government

The arch above the Speaker of the House originally held a spectators' gallery but in 1938 it was walled off and made into offices and committee rooms. Carlo Brioschi, an Italian immigrant to St. Paul, and his son Amerigo were commissioned to create a sculpture on the surface facing the House Chambers. Brioschi created the painted hand-carved plaster statuary, Minnesota Spirit of Government. The sculpture consists of an arrangement with a woman on a pedestal bearing the state seal. To the right are Sacagawea and a Native American chief; to the left are early French explorers. A common misconception is that the two are supposed to be Lewis and Clark. Below are the words, "The Trail of the Pioneer Bore the Foot prints of Liberty." The wall behind the sculpture reads, "Vox populorum est vox Dei," or, "The voice of the people is the voice of God." During the Capitol renovation from 2013 to 2017, the Minnesota Historical Society research was not able to source the statement or find out how it was chosen. Amerigo Brioschi explained the meaning behind the artwork.

...the plan was to portray the origin of the 'North Star State' and the subjects or persons that were basically responsible for the happening. The main central figure represents the North Star State brought about by the exploration of Lewis and Clark which are shown at the right of the central figure as the explorer and the voyager. On the opposite side stands the Indian Chief that guided Lewis and Clark. The Indian maiden represents Sacagawea, the maiden that provided good feeling among the different tribes that were confronted by Lewis and Clark as well as food and health care when needed by the expedition. This basic group made up the fundamental characters that made possible the establishing of the territory and the 'North Star State'.

Adding the sculptural group walled off not only spectators' gallery but it also obscured the allegorical figures of History and Records, painted by W. A. Mackay painted on either side of the arch, which were paneled and painted over.

Murals covered up in House of Representatives

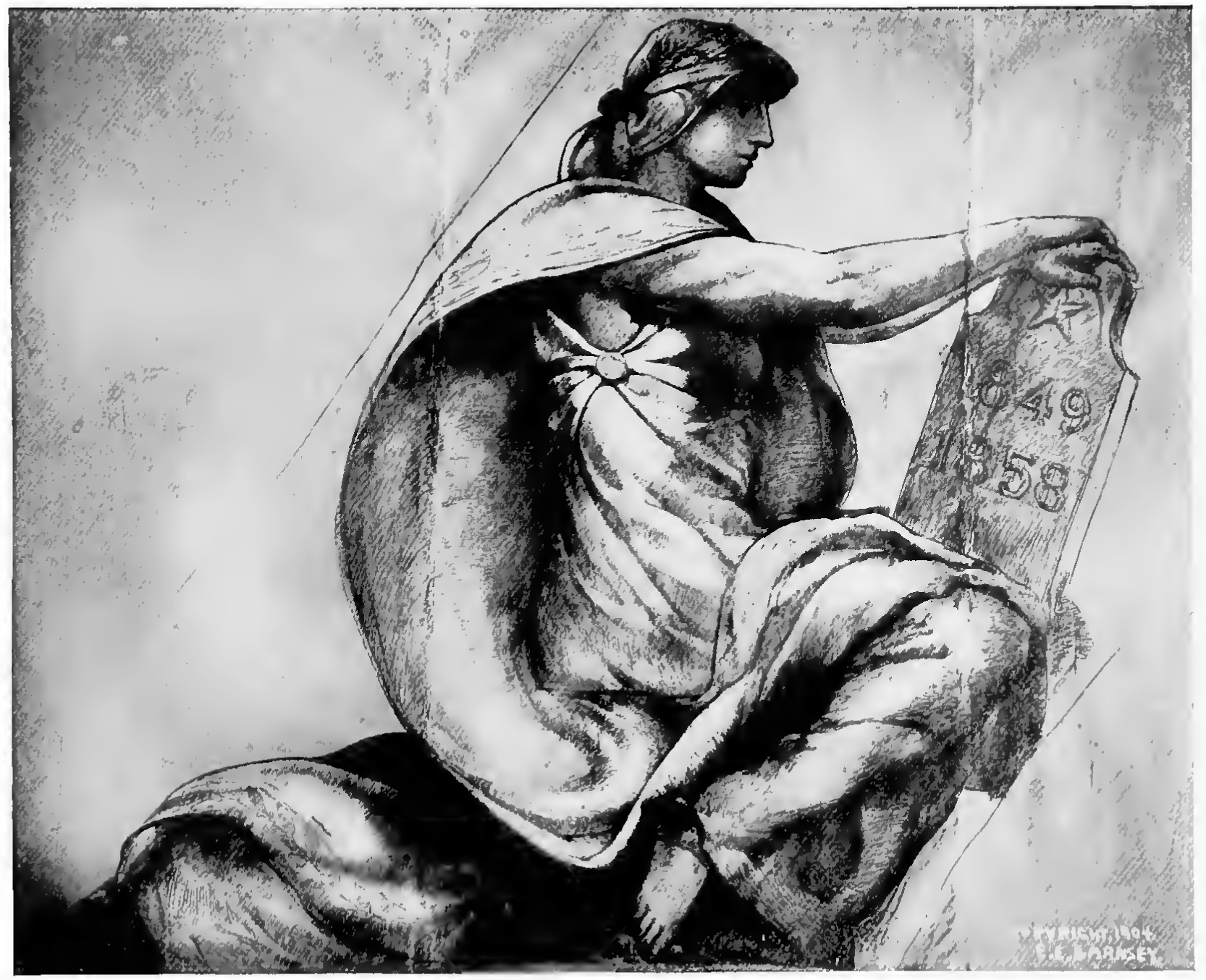
Cartoon for History-Minnesota State Capitol

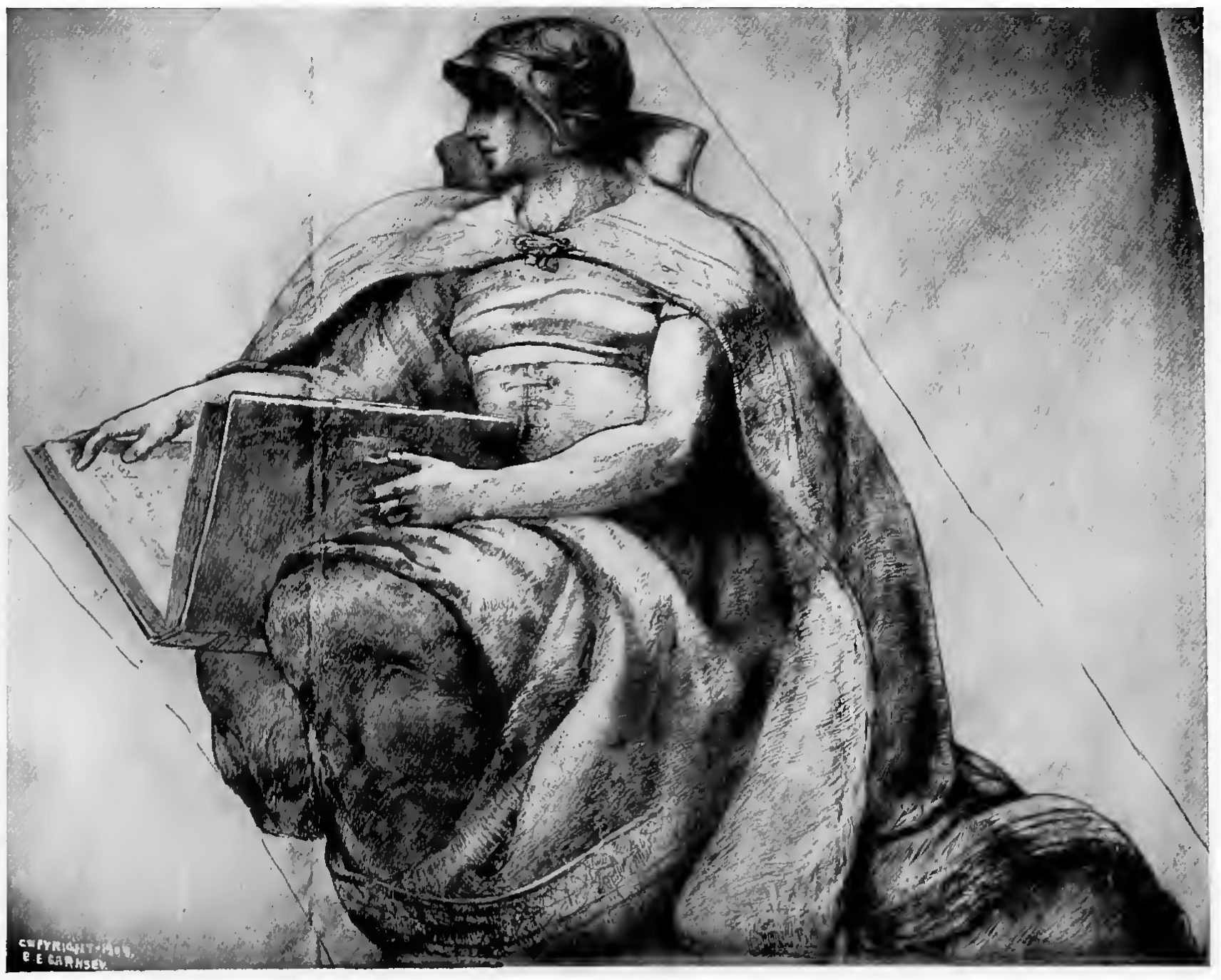
Cartoon for Records mural-Minnesota State Capitol

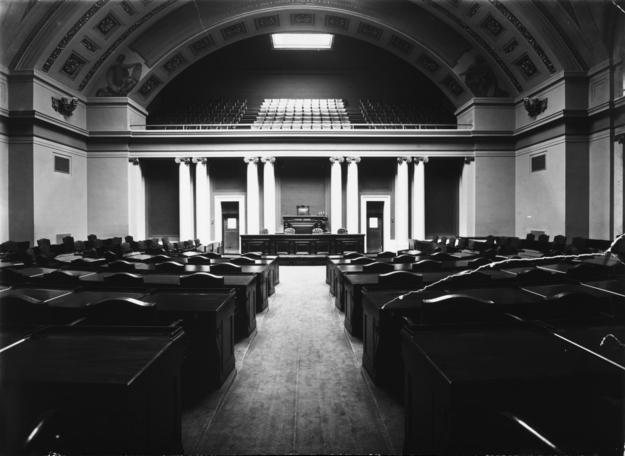
Minnesota House Chamber showing spectators' gallery.

== Minnesota Senate Chamber ==
Two large thirty-two-foot-wide murals preside on either side of the senate chamber. Both were painted by Edwin Blashfield who settled for his particular mix of history and allegory.

In 1903 the Minneapolis Journal called Blashfield the "father of municipal art." He was a prolific writer and spokesperson for the mural movement and had written that "...the sculptor and painter must believe in the architect as commander in-chief."

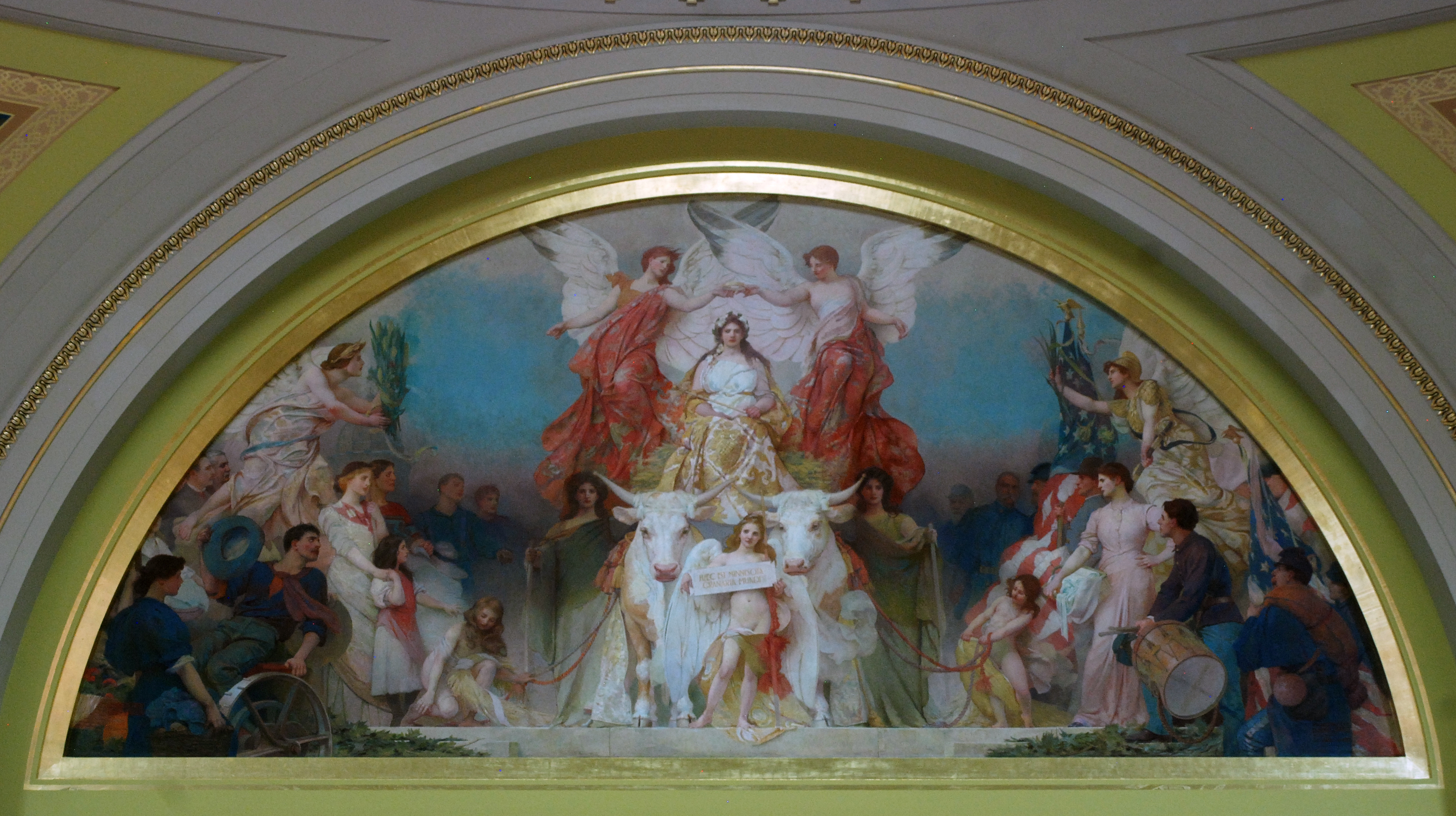
Minnesota: Granary of the World

In both murals, Blashfield represented a central symbolic figure. In the north lunette, Minnesota: Granary of the World shows Minnesota as a breadbasket and a leader in agriculture. In the center, riding on the top of a cart filled with corn and wheat and pulled by oxen is a seated woman representing Minnesota who was modeled after a popular actress of the time, Mary Anderson. Civil War soldiers on the right side of the mural communicate the state's contribution to preserving the Union. On the left side of the mural is a seated male figure on what was a modern tractor for the time, demonstrating the transition to mechanization. In a move reminiscent of the European practice of artists portraying their patrons in their works, Blashfield added profiles of the Capitol's architect, Cass Gilbert, and the vice president of the Board of Capitol Commissioners, Channing Seabury.

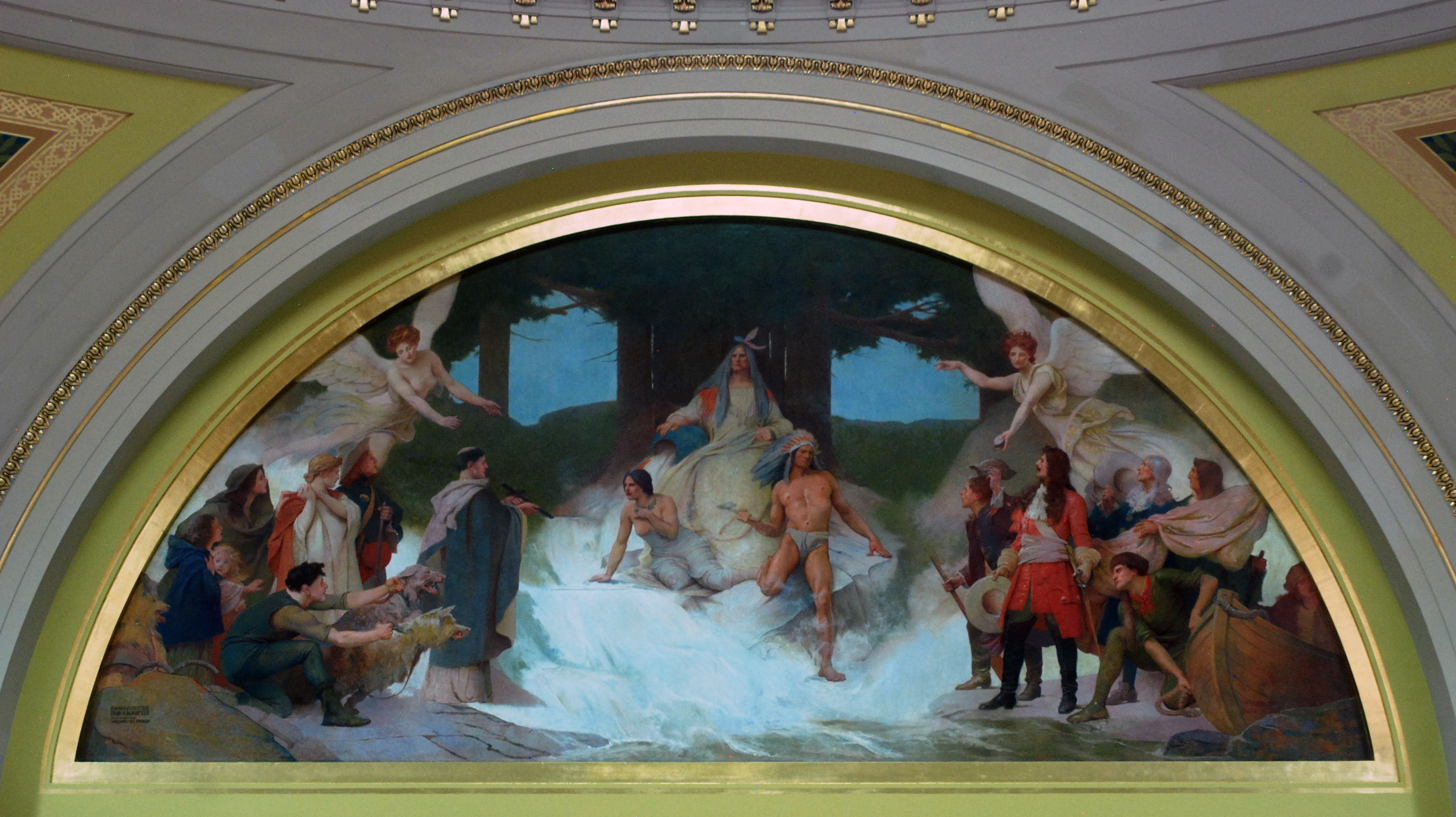
Discoverers and Civilizers Led to the Source of the Mississippi

In the south lunette Discoverers and Civilizers Led to the Source of the Mississippi, a mural that historian capitol Denis Gardner describes as, "among the most explicitly Eurocentric paintings in the capitol. Manitou or Great Spirit begins the flow of the Mississippi River by pouring water from an urn. It is a romanticized depiction of American Indians that minimalizes their contributions to Minnesota history." The painting depicts a Native American man and woman in front of the spirit Manitou in the center at the Mississippi's headwaters. They are surrounded on one side by "discoverers" on the right and "civilizers" on the left who are guided from above by angelic beings signifying divine manifest destiny. On the left guided by the "Spirit of Civilization" a priest "offers salvation in the form of a crucifix." Behind the priest squats a man restraining two irate dogs. On the right are the explorers, led by the "Spirit of Discovery", who holds a compass. The painting has been controversial and has been described as both "offensive and a false representation of customs."

== See also ==
- List of artwork at the Minnesota State Capitol
- List of inscriptions in the Minnesota State Capitol
- Minnesota State Capitol
- Minnesota State Capitol Mall
- Minnesota Governor's Residence
