= Equestrian statue of George Washington =

Equestrian statue of George Washington may refer to:

- Equestrian statue of George Washington (Boston)
- Equestrian statue of George Washington (Chicago)
- Equestrian statue of George Washington (New York City)
- Equestrian statue of George Washington (Newark)
- Equestrian statue of George Washington (Paris)
- Equestrian statue of George Washington (Philadelphia)
- Equestrian statue of George Washington (Washington Circle)
