= Statue of Wendell Phillips =

Statue in Boston, Massachusetts, U.S.

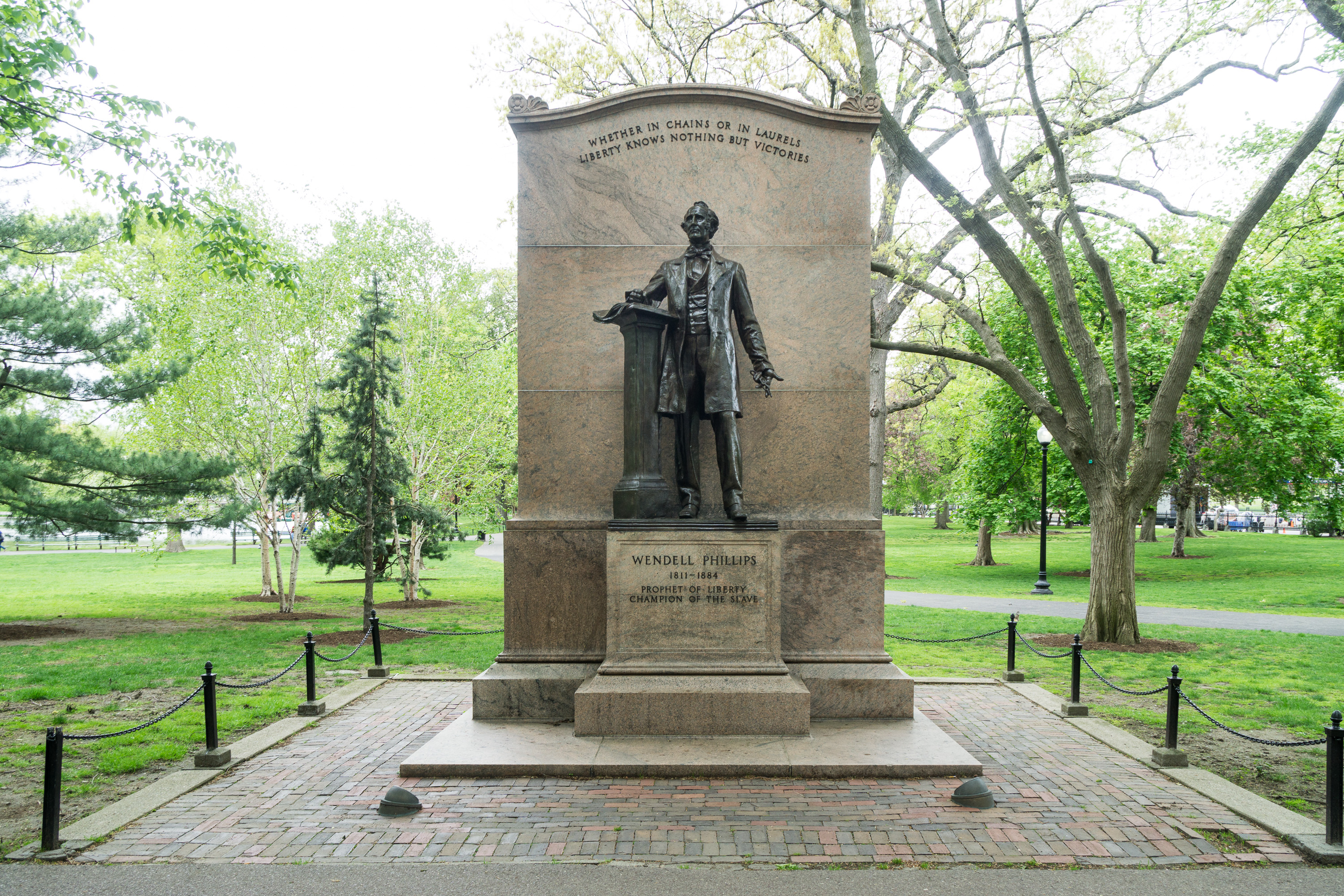
- The statue in 2017
- Artist: Daniel Chester French
- Completion date: 1914
- Medium: Bronze sculpture
- Subject: Wendell Phillips
- Location: Boston, Massachusetts, U.S.; 42°21′9.8″N 71°4′6″W

A statue of Wendell Phillips (sometimes called Wendell Phillips) is installed in Boston's Public Garden, in the U.S. state of Massachusetts.

== Description and history ==
The bronze sculpture by Daniel Chester French was cast in 1914 and dedicated on July 4, 1915. The statue rests on a Stony Creek pink granite. The artwork was surveyed by the Smithsonian Institution's "Save Outdoor Sculpture!" program in 1993.

== See also ==
- 1914 in art
- Public sculptures by Daniel Chester French
