= T. A. Chapman Memorial =

Artwork by Daniel Chester French

T.A. Chapman Memorial
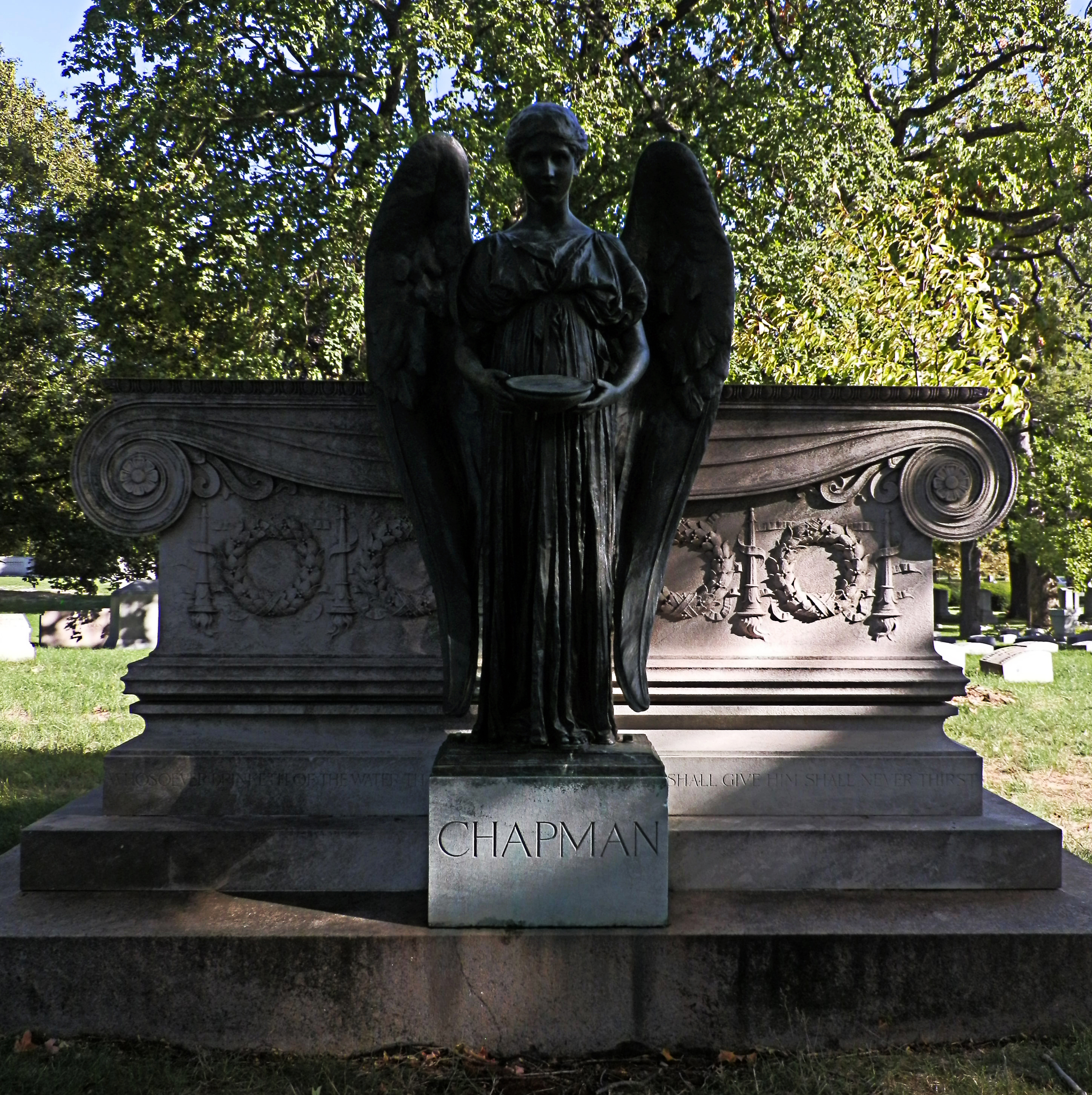
- Artist: Daniel Chester French
- Year: 1896
- Type: Bronze sculpture
- Dimensions: 160 cm × 100 cm (62 in × 41 in)
- Location: Forest Home Cemetery, Milwaukee; 42°59.97′N 87°56.59′W
- Owner: City of Milwaukee

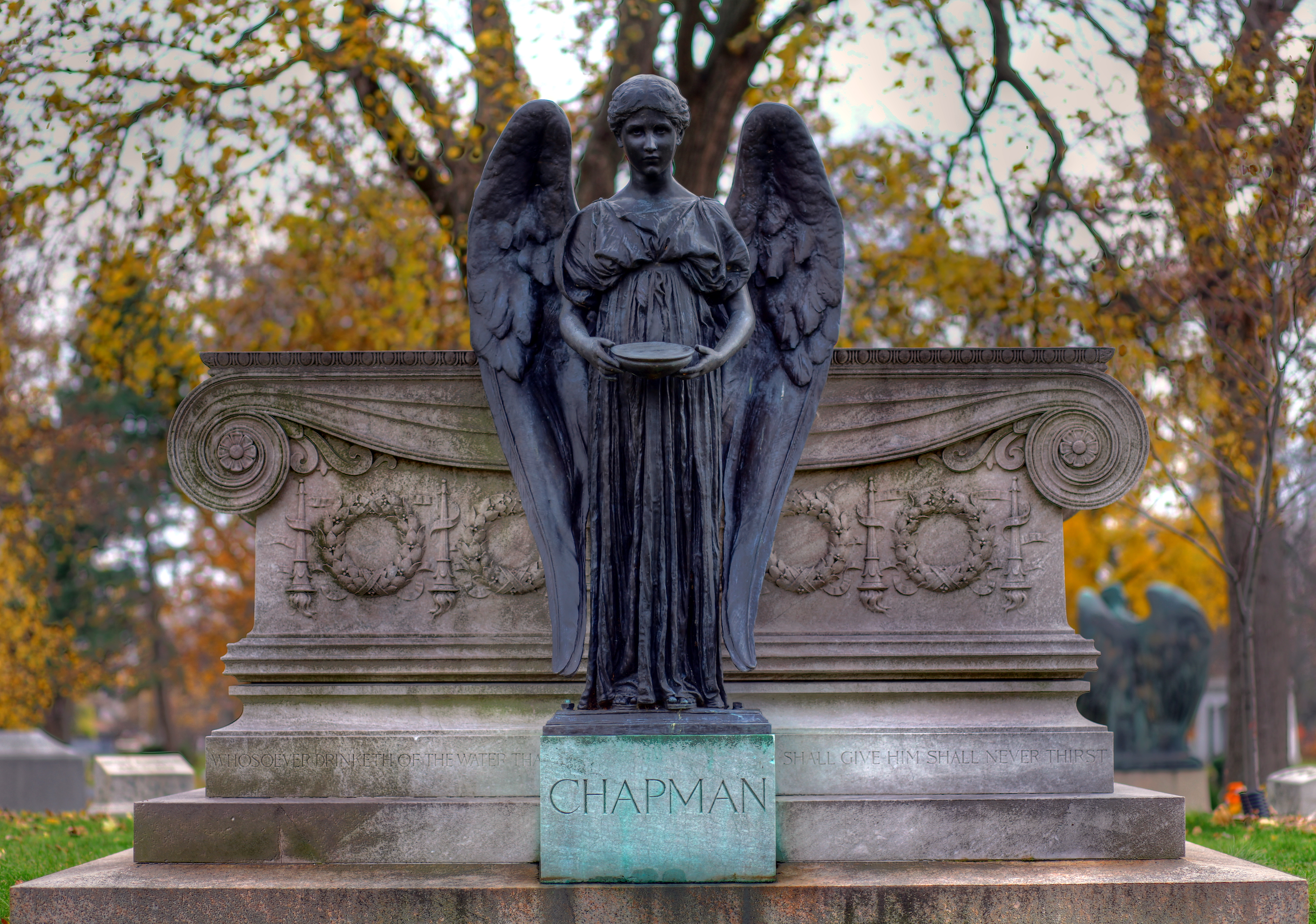
T.A.Chapman Memorial

T.A. Chapman Memorial is a public artwork by American artist Daniel Chester French. It is located at 2405 W. Forest Home Ave., in the Forest Home Cemetery Section 33 in Milwaukee, Wisconsin, United States. The bronze sculpture was cast in 1896. Its dimensions are 62 x 41 x 23 in. The concrete base it stands on is 13 ½ x 21 7/8 x 14 3/8 in.

== Description ==
Daniel Chester French’s sculpture is a memorial cast in honor of Timothy Appleton Chapman. Chapman was a pioneer dry goods merchant. The bronze statue stands tall but the angel figure is close to human proportions. It is her base that makes her seem larger than life. The statue is quite weathered. The angel has a neutral face. The figure holds a dish to symbolize the pouring of the water of life into the ground. The front of the base simply says CHAPMAN. The back of the statue says that the New York–based company Henry Bonnard Bronze cast the sculpture in 1896.

Watch a video of the T.A. Chapman Memorial

== Information ==
Upon his death in 1892, the pioneer’s wife and two daughters commissioned the sculpture. The artist, Daniel Chester French, chose to use a frequent model of his, Jessica Penn Evans. The cast can be found in front of a crypt located inside the Forest Home cemetery. An interesting fact about T.A. Chapman is that he was a major player in restoring Milwaukee after a big fire down town. It is a building on N. Milwaukee and East Milwaukee. The building was built five stories high and contained beautiful murals painted by Vergillio Tojetti. He established T.A. Chapman Co. in 1857. The artist, Daniel Chester French, is more well known for his design of the Lincoln Memorial.

== Condition ==
According to the Smithsonian Art Inventories database, the statue was last surveyed in May 1993, and it needed some treatment.

== See also ==
- Public sculptures by Daniel Chester French
