= Public sculptures by Daniel Chester French =

List of artworks

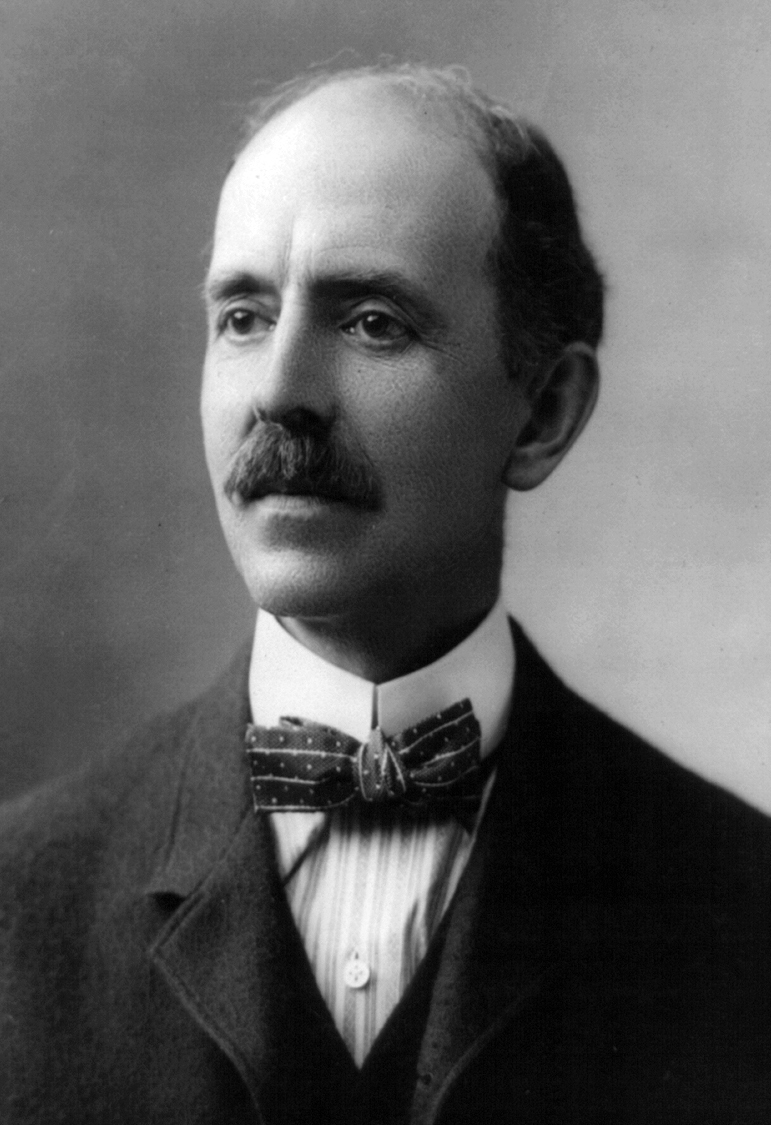
Daniel Chester French in 1902

Daniel Chester French (1850–1931) was an American sculptor who was active in the nineteenth and twentieth centuries. He was born in Exeter, New Hampshire, to Anne Richardson French and Henry Flagg French on April 20, 1850. His father, a polymath, was a judge and college president who popularized the French drain. In 1867, the family moved to Concord, Massachusetts, and French enrolled at the Massachusetts Institute of Technology. French did not perform well academically and, after a year, he left the college and returned to Concord where he first learned sculpture while attending art classes with Louisa May Alcott. Between 1869 and 1872, French studied anatomy with William Rimmer, and in 1870 he undertook a one-month apprenticeship with the sculptor John Quincy Adams Ward. After completing The Minute Man in 1875, French studied sculpture in Florence, Italy, for a year, during part of which he worked out of Thomas Ball's studio.

French's education ended and career began in 1876 when he accepted a contract to produce a set of statues for the United States Post Office Department. He created statues for the Post Office throughout the 1880s. In 1883, French was commissioned to create John Harvard. For the rest of his career, French produced commissions for state, federal, and private groups as well as private individuals. In 1896, he moved his studio to Chesterwood, in Stockbridge, Massachusetts, where it remained until his death. In 1912, French was appointed as chair of the United States Commission of Fine Arts. He continued to be on the commission until 1915, when he resigned to accept his most famous commission, Abraham Lincoln, which sits in the Lincoln Memorial. On October 7, 1931, French died in his sleep.

French was a prolific sculptor, creating 94 existent public sculptures and nine that have been destroyed from 1871 until his death in 1931. His sculptures are mostly in the eastern and midwestern United States, but one, Thomas Starr King, is in San Francisco, and two, General George Washington and the Marseillaise Memorial, are in France. The majority of the sculptures are bronze castings or made of stone, but Progress of the State is gilded copper, and Alma Mater, (Note: The gilding has come off Alma Mater and Columbia University has opted not to replace it (Holzer 2019, p. 201).) Wisconsin, and The Republic are gilded bronze. Nearly all of French's works are solo, but ten, Ulysses S. Grant, General George Washington (Paris), Joseph Hooker, General George Washington (Chicago), General Charles Devens, Indian Corn, Wheat, Progress of the State, The Triumph of Columbus, and Agriculture, were the result of a collaboration with Edward Clark Potter. General Philip H. Sheridan was a completion of an unfinished statue by John Quincy Adams Ward, and the Daniel Webster Memorial was completed by Margaret French Cresson after French's death.

== Existent public sculpture ==
Public sculpture
Name	Photo	Location	City or neighborhood	Year(s) (Note: Year or years that French worked on the statue)	Material	Notes	Ref(s)
The Minute Man	Greened bronze statue of a young colonial man. He holds a rifle, and his coat is on a plow beside him.	Minute Man National Historical Park; 42.4689°N 71.3512°W	Concord, Massachusetts	1871–1875	Bronze		
Law, Prosperity, and Power	Three stone figures	Fairmount Park; 39.9844°N 75.2233°W	Philadelphia, Pennsylvania	1878–1882	Marble	Created for the United States Post Office in Philadelphia and moved to its current location in 1937	
Peace and Vigilance	—N/a	United States Customhouse and Post Office; 38.6288°N 90.1927°W	St. Louis, Missouri	1878–1882	Marble		
John Harvard	Bronze statue of a seated man	Harvard Yard; 42.3744°N 71.1171°W	Cambridge, Massachusetts	1883–1884	Bronze		
Science Controlling the Forces of Electricity and Steam	Science Controlling the Forces of Electricity and Steam (1880–1885) by Daniel Chester French	Franklin Park Zoo; 42.3074°N 71.0918°W	Dorchester, Boston, Massachusetts	1880–1885	Marble	Created for the United States Post Office and Sub-Treasury Building in Boston and moved to its current location in 1930	
Labor Sustaining Art and the Family		Franklin Park Zoo; 42.3075°N 71.0916°W	Dorchester, Boston, Massachusetts	1882–1885	Marble	Created for the United States Post Office and Sub-Treasury Building in Boston and moved to its current location in 1930	
Thomas Gallaudet Memorial	Bronze statue of a seated man with a young girl beside him	Gallaudet University; 38.9055°N 76.9952°W	NoMa, Washington, District of Columbia	1885–1889	Bronze		
Death and the Sculptor	Bronze inlay in a stone monument showing an female angel and a male sculptor	Forest Hills Cemetery; 42.2978°N 71.1075°W	Jamaica Plain, Boston, Massachusetts	1889–1893	Bronze	Also called the Milmore Memorial and The Angel of Death and the Young Sculptor	
Thomas Starr King	Stone statue of a standing man on a stone pedestal	Golden Gate Park; 37.7722°N 122.4662°W	San Francisco, California	1888–1892	Bronze		
John Boyle O'Reilly Memorial	Three bronze figures	The Fenway; 42.3462°N 71.0911°W	Fenway–Kenmore, Boston, Massachusetts	1889–1893	Bronze	Also called Erin and Her Sons, Patriotism, and Poetry	
Chapman Memorial	Bronze angel	Forest Home Cemetery; 42.9995°N 87.9431°W	Milwaukee, Wisconsin	1896–1897	Bronze	Also called the T.A. Chapman Memorial and the Alice G. Chapman Memorial	
George Robert White Memorial		Forest Hills Cemetery; 42.296956°N 71.104575°W	Jamaica Plain, Boston, Massachusetts	1898	Bronze	Also called the Angel of Peace	
University Club Seals	Stone building	University Club of New York; 40.7613°N 73.9756°W	Manhattan, New York, New York	1898	Stone	Seals of Harvard University, Yale University, Princeton University, Columbia University, Brown University, Williams College, Amherst College, Hamilton College, United States Military Academy, and United States Naval Academy	
General George Meade	—N/a	Smith Memorial Arch; 39.9775°N 75.2067°W	Philadelphia, Pennsylvania	1898	Bronze		
Ulysses S. Grant	Bronze statue of a man on a horse	Fairmount Park; 39.9808°N 75.1979°W	Philadelphia, Pennsylvania	1892–1899	Bronze	Created with Edward Clark Potter	
General George Washington	Bronze statue of a man on a horse	Place d'Iéna; 48.8647°N 2.2939°E	16th arrondissement of Paris	1896–1900	Bronze	Created with Edward Clark Potter	
Justice	—N/a	Appellate Division of the New York Supreme Court, First Judicial Department; 40.7421°N 73.9867°W	Manhattan, New York, New York	1900	Marble	Also known as Justice, Power, and Study	
Governor John S. Pillsbury	Bronze statue of man standing on a granite pedestal	University of Minnesota; 44.9782°N 93.2369°W	Minneapolis, Minnesota	1900	Bronze		
Wisdom	Marble statue of person holding globe	Minnesota State Capitol; 44.9548°N 93.1023°W	Saint Paul, Minnesota	1896–1901	Marble		
Courage	Marble statue of man in Roman legionary armor	Minnesota State Capitol; 44.9548°N 93.1023°W	Saint Paul, Minnesota	1896–1901	Marble		
Bounty	Marble statue of a woman holding grain and a baby	Minnesota State Capitol; 44.9548°N 93.1023°W	Saint Paul, Minnesota	1896–1901	Marble		
Truth	Marble statue of a woman holding a mirror	Minnesota State Capitol; 44.9548°N 93.1023°W	Saint Paul, Minnesota	1896–1901	Marble		
Integrity	Marble statue of man in toga holding scroll	Minnesota State Capitol; 44.9548°N 93.1023°W	Saint Paul, Minnesota	1896–1901	Marble		
Prudence	Marble statue of woman holding lamp	Minnesota State Capitol; 44.9548°N 93.1023°W	Saint Paul, Minnesota	1896–1901	Marble		
Richard Morris Hunt Memorial	Three bronze statues on the left, center, and right of a larger curved stone structure	Central Park; 40.7715°N 73.9679°W	Manhattan, New York, New York	1896–1901	Bronze		
Commodore George Hamilton Perkins Memorial	Bronze statue of a man standing with his hand on his sword at his hip	New Hampshire State House; 43.2068°N 71.5385°W	Concord, New Hampshire	1899–1902	Bronze		
Alma Mater	Bronze statue of a crowned woman sitting with an open book on her lap	Low Memorial Library; 40.8078°N 73.9621°W	Manhattan, New York, New York	1900–1903	Gilded bronze		
Music and Poetry	Biblioteca Boston puertas bronce 03	Boston Public Library, McKim Building; 42.3496°N 71.0774°W	Back Bay, Boston, Massachusetts	1894–1904	Bronze		
Knowledge and Wisdom		Boston Public Library, McKim Building; 42.3496°N 71.0774°W	Back Bay, Boston, Massachusetts	1894–1904	Bronze		
Truth and Romance	Biblioteca Boston puertas bronce 05	Boston Public Library, McKim Building; 42.3496°N 71.0774°W	Back Bay, Boston, Massachusetts	1894–1904	Bronze		
General Joseph Hooker	Bronze statue of a man on a horse	Massachusetts State House; 42.3577°N 71.0645°W	Beacon Hill, Boston, Massachusetts	1898–1904	Bronze	Created with Edward Clark Potter	
Colonel James Anderson Memorial	Bronze statues on the top and center of a marble monument	Carnegie Free Library of Allegheny; 40.4529°N 80.0060°W	Allegheny Center, Pittsburgh, Pennsylvania	1899–1904	Bronze		
General George Washington	Bronze statue of a man on a horse	Washington Park; 41.8025°N 87.6164°W	Washington Park, Chicago, Illinois	1903–1904	Bronze	Created with Edward Clark Potter, replica of original in Paris	
General Charles Devens	Bronze statue of a man on a horse	Institutional District; 42.2712°N 71.8000°W	Worcester, Massachusetts	1902–1906	Bronze	Created with Edward Clark Potter	
Francis Parkman Memorial	Granite pillar with a carved inlay of a male figure	Olmsted Park; 42.3179°N 71.1244°W	Jamaica Plain, Boston, Massachusetts	1897–1907	Granite		
Asia	Sculpture "Asia" at main entrance to Alexander Hamilton U.S. Custom House, New York, New York LCCN2010720093	Alexander Hamilton U.S. Custom House; 40.7042°N 74.0136°W	Manhattan, New York, New York	1905–1907	Marble	Part of a group known as the Four Continents	
America	Marble statue of a seated woman	Alexander Hamilton U.S. Custom House; 40.7042°N 74.0136°W	Manhattan, New York, New York	1905–1907	Marble	Part of a group known as the Four Continents	
Europe	New York City, May 2014 - 044	Alexander Hamilton U.S. Custom House; 40.7042°N 74.0136°W	Manhattan, New York, New York	1905–1907	Marble	Part of a group known as the Four Continents	
Africa		Alexander Hamilton U.S. Custom House; 40.7042°N 74.0136°W	Manhattan, New York, New York	1905–1907	Marble	Part of a group known as the Four Continents	
Progress of the State	Golden statue of man on a chariot with two women leading the horses	Minnesota State Capitol; 44.9550°N 93.1023°W	Saint Paul, Minnesota	1905–1907	Gilded copper	Created with Edward Clark Potter	
Jurisprudence	Marble statue of a seated woman holding a tablet	Howard M. Metzenbaum United States Courthouse; 41.5006°N 81.6926°W	Cleveland, Ohio	1905–1908	Marble		
Commerce	Marble statue of a seated woman leaning on a globe	Howard M. Metzenbaum United States Courthouse; 41.5006°N 81.6926°W	Cleveland, Ohio	1905–1908	Marble		
Senator George Frisbie Hoar	Bronze statue of a seated man	Worcester City Hall and Common; 42.2630°N 71.8020°W	Worcester, Massachusetts	1907–1908	Bronze		
Melvin Memorial	Stone pillar with a carved inlay of a female figure	Sleepy Hollow Cemetery; 42.4636°N 71.3434°W	Concord, Massachusetts	1906–1909	Marble	Also called Mourning Victory	
August Robert Meyer Memorial	Bronze tablet on a stone structure depicting a standing man	The Paseo; 39.1020°N 94.5637°W	Kansas City, Missouri	1907–1909	Bronze		
Greek Epic Poetry	—N/a	Brooklyn Museum; 40.6712°N 73.9638°W	Brooklyn, New York, New York	1907–1909	Marble		
Greek Lyric Poetry	—N/a	Brooklyn Museum; 40.6712°N 73.9638°W	Brooklyn, New York, New York	1907–1909	Marble		
Greek Religion	—N/a	Brooklyn Museum; 40.6712°N 73.9638°W	Brooklyn, New York, New York	1907–1909	Marble		
Governor James Edward Oglethorpe	Bronze statue of a standing man in a tricornered hat holding a sword	Chippewa Square; 32.0758°N 81.0931°W	Savannah, Georgia	1907–1910	Bronze		
Samuel Spencer	Bronze statue of a seated man on a round pillar	Peachtree Street; 33.7879°N 84.3840°W	Atlanta, Georgia	1909–1910	Bronze	Created for Terminal Station and moved several time before being placed in its current location in 2009	
Edward I	—N/a	Cuyahoga County Courthouse; 41.5033°N 81.6969°W	Cleveland, Ohio	1910	Marble		
John Hampden	—N/a	Cuyahoga County Courthouse; 41.5033°N 81.6969°W	Cleveland, Ohio	1910	Marble		
Modern and Ancient History Flanking the Seal of the New Hampshire Historical Society	Two stone figures propping up a seal	New Hampshire Historical Society; 43.2072°N 71.5395°W	Concord, New Hampshire	1909–1911	Granite		
Marshall Field Memorial	Bronze statue of a seated woman	Graceland Cemetery; 41.9603°N 87.6612°W	Uptown, Chicago, Illinois	1908–1912	Bronze	Also called Memory	
Kinsley Memorial	—N/a	Woodlawn Cemetery (Note: The exact coordinates are unknown.)	The Bronx, New York, New York	1908–1912	Bronze		
Abraham Lincoln	Bronze statue of a standing man	Nebraska State Capitol; 40.8081°N 96.7009°W	Lincoln, Nebraska	1909–1912	Bronze	Also called Abraham Lincoln, Standing or Gettysburg Lincoln	
General William Draper	Bronze statue of a man on a horse	Draper Memorial Park; 42.1393°N 71.5215°W	Milford, Massachusetts	1910–1912	Bronze		
Butt–Millet Memorial Fountain	Fountain with a carved pillar in the center	President's Park; 38.8953°N 77.0375°W	Washington, District of Columbia	1912–1913	Marble		
Henry Wadsworth Longfellow Memorial	Bronze bust of a man	Longfellow House–Washington's Headquarters National Historic Site; 42.3753°N 71.1271°W	Cambridge, Massachusetts	1908–1914	Bronze and marble		
Rutherfurd B. Stuyvesant Memorial	Statue of a standing angel	Tranquility Cemetery; 40.948784°N 74.802179°W	Green Township, New Jersey	1912–1914	Marble	Also called the Angel of Peace	
Wisconsin	Golden statue of a standing woman holding a torch	Wisconsin Capitol Building; 43.074444°N 89.384722°W	Madison, Wisconsin	1912–1914	Gilded Bronze		
Indian Corn	Statue of a woman holding a corn plant leaning on a cow	Garfield Park; 41.8866°N 87.71856°W	East Garfield Park, Chicago, Illinois	1914	Bronze	Part of a group known as The Bulls; created with Edward Clark Potter; cast from c.1893 plaster statues	
Wheat	—N/a	Garfield Park; 41.8866°N 87.7187°W	East Garfield Park, Chicago, Illinois	1914	Bronze	Part of a group known as The Bulls; created with Edward Clark Potter; cast from c.1893 plaster statues	
Wendell Phillips		Boston Public Garden; 42.3527°N 71.0683°W	Boston, Massachusetts	1913–1915	Bronze		
Sculpture	—N/a	Saint Louis Art Museum; 38.6396°N 90.2944°W	St Louis, Missouri	1913–1915	Marble		
Spencer Trask Memorial	Bronze statue of an angel	Canfield Casino and Congress Park; 43.0790°N 73.7853°W	Saratoga Springs, New York	1913–1915	Bronze	Also known as the Spirit of Life	
Brooklyn	Stone statue of a seated woman	Brooklyn Museum; 40.6712°N 73.9638°W	Brooklyn, New York, New York	1913–1916	Granite	Part of a group known as the Manhattan Bridge group	
Manhattan	Stone statue of a seated woman	Brooklyn Museum; 40.6712°N 73.9638°W	Brooklyn, New York, New York	1913–1916	Granite	Part of a group known as the Manhattan Bridge group	
Marquis de La Fayette Memorial	Brooklyn 3733 (2625845460) (cropped)	Prospect Park; 40.6645°N 73.9766°W	Brooklyn, New York, New York	1914–1916	Bronze		
General Philip H. Sheridan	Bronze statue of a man on a horse	New York State Capitol; 42.6519°N 73.7561°W	Albany, New York	1916	Bronze	Completed by French after John Quincy Adams Ward's death in 1910	
The Republic	Golden statue of a woman holding a scepter and a dove	Jackson Park; 41.7796°N 87.5799°W	Chicago, Illinois	1915–1918	Gilded bronze		
Jesse Parker Williams Memorial	—N/a	Westview Cemetery	Atlanta, Georgia	1915–1920	Marble	Also called Spirit of Achievement	
Ruth Anne Dodge Memorial	Bronze statue of an angel	Fairview Cemetery; 41.2678°N 95.8486°W	Council Bluffs, Iowa	1916–1920	Bronze	Also called Dream Angel	
The Marseillaise Memorial	—N/a	Hôtel de Hanau; 48.5846°N 7.7507°E	Strasbourg, France	1919–1920	Bronze	Also called the Claude Rouget de Lisle Memorial	
Hazard Memorial	—N/a	Peace Dale, Rhode Island; 41.4504°N 71.4954°W	South Kingstown, Rhode Island	1916–1920	Bronze	Also called Life, Time, and the Weaver	
Russell Alger Memorial	Bronze statue of a female figure	Grand Circus Park Historic District; 42.3369°N 83.0499°W	Detroit, Michigan	1913–1921	Bronze		
Sea	Marble statue of a female figure	Dupont Circle; 38.9092°N 77.0417°W	Dupont Circle, Washington, District of Columbia	1917–1921	Marble	Part of the Dupont Circle Fountain	
Stars	Marble statue of a female figure	Dupont Circle; 38.9092°N 77.0417°W	Dupont Circle, Washington, District of Columbia	1917–1921	Marble	Part of the Dupont Circle Fountain	
Wind	Marble statue of a male figure	Dupont Circle; 38.9092°N 77.0417°W	Dupont Circle, Washington, District of Columbia	1917–1921	Marble	Part of the Dupont Circle Fountain	
Exeter War Memorial	Bronze statue of a woman holding a flag behind a soldier	Gale Park; 42.9771°N 70.9555°W	Exeter, New Hampshire	1920–1921	Bronze		
Abraham Lincoln	Lincoln Memorial - 01 (cropped)	Lincoln Memorial; 38.8893°N 77.0501°W	National Mall, Washington, District of Columbia	1915–1922	Marble		
Marquis de La Fayette Memorial	Statue of Lafayette at Lafayette College	Colton Chapel; 40.6977°N 75.2089°W	Easton, Pennsylvania	1921	Bronze		
Alfred Tredway White Memorial	Bronze tablet of a woman handing a plant to a young boy	Brooklyn Botanic Garden	Brooklyn, New York, New York	1921–1923	Bronze		
First Division Monument	Golden statue of a female angel figure with flag	President's Park; 38.8961°N 77.0387°W	Washington, District of Columbia	1921–1924	Bronze		
Dean James Woods Green	Bronze statue of two standing men	University of Kansas; 38.9577°N 95.2440°W	Lawrence, Kansas	1922–1924	Bronze		
George Robert White Memorial	Bronze statue of a female angel figure	Boston Public Garden; 42.3554°N 71.0722°W	Boston, Massachusetts	1922–1924	Bronze	Also called The Spirit of Giving	
Milton War Memorial	—N/a	Milton Centre Historic District; 42.2540°N 71.0791°W	Milton, Massachusetts	1923–1925	Bronze	Also called In Flanders Fields	
Washington Irving Memorial	Bronze bust flanked by two male statues of Irving characters	Sunnyside; 41.0478°N 73.8614°W	Irvington, New York	1924–1927	Bronze		
William Henry Seward Memorial	—N/a	Florida, New York; 41.3333°N 74.3575°W	Florida, New York	1923–1930	Bronze		
George Westinghouse Memorial	Three bronze tablets	Schenley Park; 40.4395°N 79.9427°W	Pittsburgh, Pennsylvania	1926–1930	Bronze		
The Spirit of American Youth	Broze statue of a young boy holding books	Schenley Park; 40.4395°N 79.9427°W	Pittsburgh, Pennsylvania	1926–1930	Bronze	Part of the George Westinghouse Memorial	
Ball Brothers Memorial	Bronze statue of a female angel figure	Ball State University; 40.1983°N 85.4103°W	Muncie, Indiana	1929–1931	Bronze	Also called Beneficence	
Daniel Webster Memorial	Bronze bust of Daniel Webster in front of a white church	Congregational Christian Church; 43.4411°N 71.6587°W	Franklin, New Hampshire	1931–1932	Bronze	Completed after French's death in 1931 by Margaret French Cresson	

== Destroyed public sculpture ==
Public sculpture
Name	Photo	Created for	Location	Year(s) created	Material	Notes	Ref(s)
The Republic	Statue of a woman holding a scepter and an orb	World's Columbian Exposition	Jackson Park, Chicago, Illinois	1891–1893	Gilded staff	The Republic is a reworking of this statue	
The Triumph of Columbus	A tiered roof with a statue of four horses pulling a chariot on top	World's Columbian Exposition	Chicago, Illinois	1892–1893	Staff	Created with Edward Clark Potter	
Agriculture	—N/a	World's Columbian Exposition	Chicago, Illinois	1892–1893	Staff	Created with Edward Clark Potter; Indian Corn and Wheat are partial casts of this statue	
Peace	Section of arch showing angel over domestic scenes	Dewey Arch	Madison Square, New York, New York	1898–1899	Staff		
DeWit Clinton	—N/a	Chamber of Commerce Building	New York, New York	1903	Stone		
Napoleon Bonaparte	Plaster statue of a man sitting in a chair	Louisiana Purchase Exposition	St. Louis, Missouri	1902–1904	Staff		
Samuel Bowles	—N/a	Springfield Republican building	Springfield, Massachusetts	1909	Bronze		
The Genius of Creation	Stone statue an angel	Panama-Pacific International Exposition	San Francisco, California	1913–1915	Staff		
Disarmament	—N/a	World War I victory arch	Madison Square, New York, New York	1919	Staff		
