= Progress of the State =

Sculpture at the Minnesota State Capitol

Coordinates: 44°57′18″N 93°06′08″W

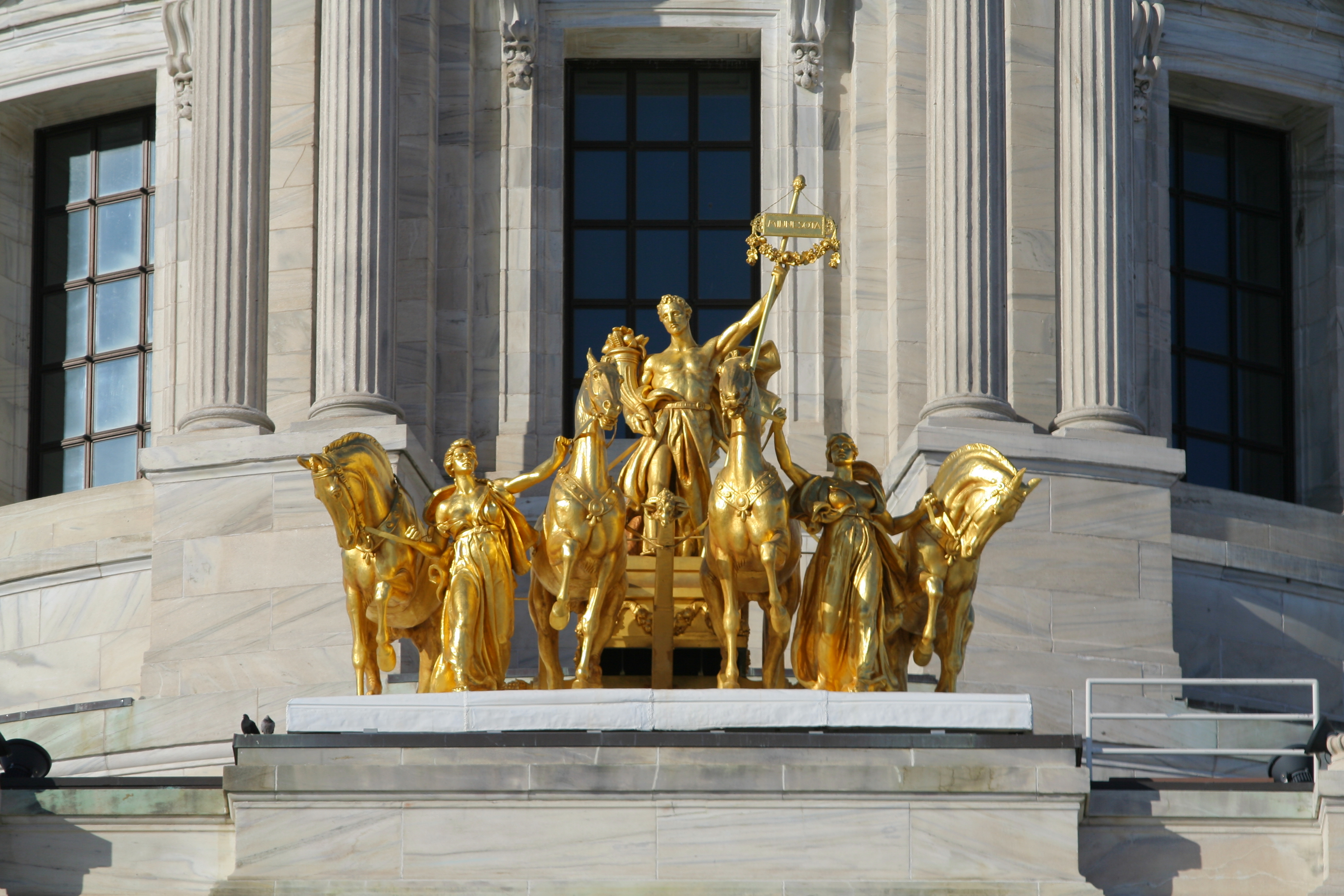
The Progress of the State quadriga at the base of the Minnesota State Capitol dome.

Progress of the State is the title of a group of sculptural figures that sits above the south portico, at the main entrance to the Minnesota State Capitol in Saint Paul, the state capital of the U.S. state of Minnesota.

The allegorical statuary group representing civilization is in an arrangement known as a quadriga, consisting of a chariot pulled by four horses. Three human figures, two women and a man, are included. The sculpture, made by Daniel Chester French and Edward Clark Potter, was based on their earlier Columbus Quadriga statuary, at the World's Columbian Exposition of 1893 in Chicago. It was completed and raised to the roof of the capitol in 1906. The underlying armature is steel covered in copper. The exterior copper surface is gilded in 23 karat gold leaf and requires re-gilding approximately every 20 years.

== Design ==
The quadriga arrangement is a style of statue reproducing ancient Greek and Roman four-horse chariots. In the Minnesota quadriga the male charioteer holds aloft a variation of a Roman Legion standard inscribed with the state name MINNESOTA.

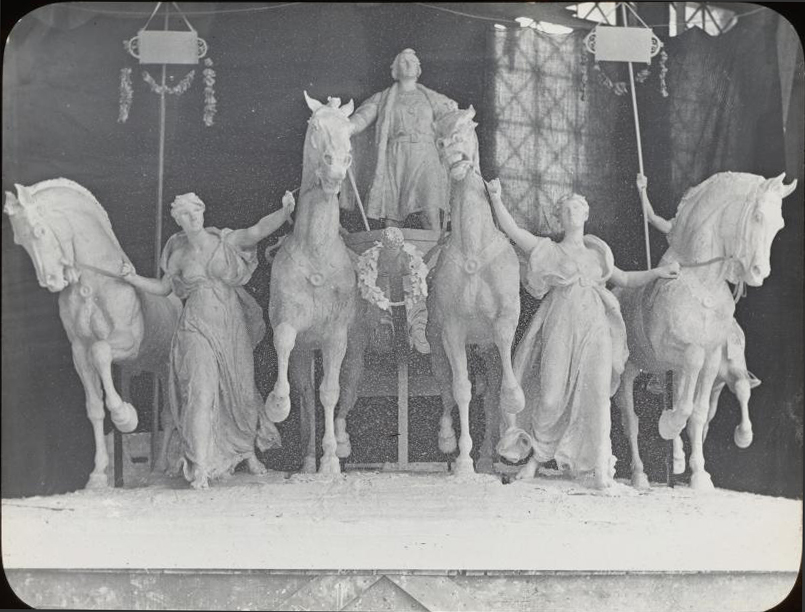
Columbus Quadriga-World's Columbian Exposition, Chicago, Illinois - 1893

In his design for the Capitol, architect Cass Gilbert left out the classical triangular pediment favored in the Neoclassical and Beaux-Arts government architecture of the time and instead in its place installed a quadriga monument at the base of the dome. The quadriga is unusual in that it sits atop a building's portico, rather than upon a triumphal arch like most others. The inspiration for the Minnesota quadriga was the Columbus Quadriga, a statue depicting Christopher Columbus standing in a four horse chariot guided by two maidens carrying staffs of victory that Daniel Chester French and Edward Clark Potter had modeled for the World's Columbian Exposition of 1893 in Chicago. Potter was a specialist in equestrian and other animal sculptures who teamed up with French to create the four horses in the monument. Gilbert saw this quadriga group at and made plans to have artists adapt it for Minnesota.

The Board had two options for how French could render the group. By French's estimates in 1896 he could cast it in bronze for $49,500 or make it from hammered copper for $36,000. The 1903 state appropriation set aside $35,000 for the group "to be executed in copper." French continued to hope to cast the Quadriga in bronze, as late as spring of 1906, but Gilbert communicated the Board's refusal: "However much they would like to use bronze they have not the money available for this purpose, as their appropriation is now all engaged in finishing up various minor items which are regarded as essential." The statuary was then executed in hammered copper surrounding a framework of steel supports.

While the statuary was generally well received, there was push back from veteran groups, politicians and the Minnesota Historical Society over the use of allegorical figures throughout the Capitol instead of representations of Minnesota heroes and historic events. One critic encouraged Minnesotans to, "Take a sledge hammer and smash them Roman bronchos and that chariot! Clean 'em out and put a grand heroic statue of Alexander Ramsey in their stead!"

== Symbolism ==
Progress of the State was devised as an allegorical statuary where a prosperous Minnesota proceeds onward by means of the power of nature (horses) and civilization (the women). The four horses in the Minnesota quadriga represent the classical elements of earth, air, fire, and water. Independently, the women represent industry and agriculture. Collectively, they represent civilization. In addition to personifying the state of Minnesota, the male charioteer holding a cornucopia (horn of plenty), a symbol of abundance and nourishment, represents prosperity.

French's letter on adapting his earlier quadriga from the World's Columbian Exposition to Minnesota quadriga demonstrates the casualness with which allegorical meaning could be ascribed to a statue, and vice versa.

"You will be glad to know that I have begun a model for the central figure (in the chariot) of the Quadriga. The other figures are already designed, as are the horses, since we are to follow the Quadriga which presided over the Columbian Arch at Chicago... The central figure, representing Columbus would, of course, not be appropriate for the State Capitol of Minnesota, so that a new design for this figure is necessary. As the two figures leading the horses are female figures, I think the figure in the chariot should be a male figure," he wrote. "I think it should represent "Minnesota", if you think that a male figure can personify a state."

== Restorations ==
Re-gilding the sculpture in 23 karat gold leaf is necessary approximately every 20 years. Every year, the condition of the statuary is reviewed with conservators making slight repairs and touching up the gold leaf as necessary. The sculpture group underwent re-gilding in 1949 and again in 1979. In 1994 the group was taken down from the capitol roof for a year-long restoration procedure. The quadriga was reinstalled in 1995 and the figures have had several minor in situ reapplications of gold leaf since. During a comprehensive restoration of the State Capitol building the figure of the charioteer was removed and lowered to the ground in 2014 to allow repairs to corrosion of the top surface of the chariot and was reinstalled in 2015. On May 7, 2016, the Quadriga was again removed from the roof in order to allow for roofing repairs below. During that time the statuary was relocated to nearby warehouse where it was re-gilded. On November 12, 2016 the Quadriga was re-installed on the Minnesota State Capitol roof.

Restoration

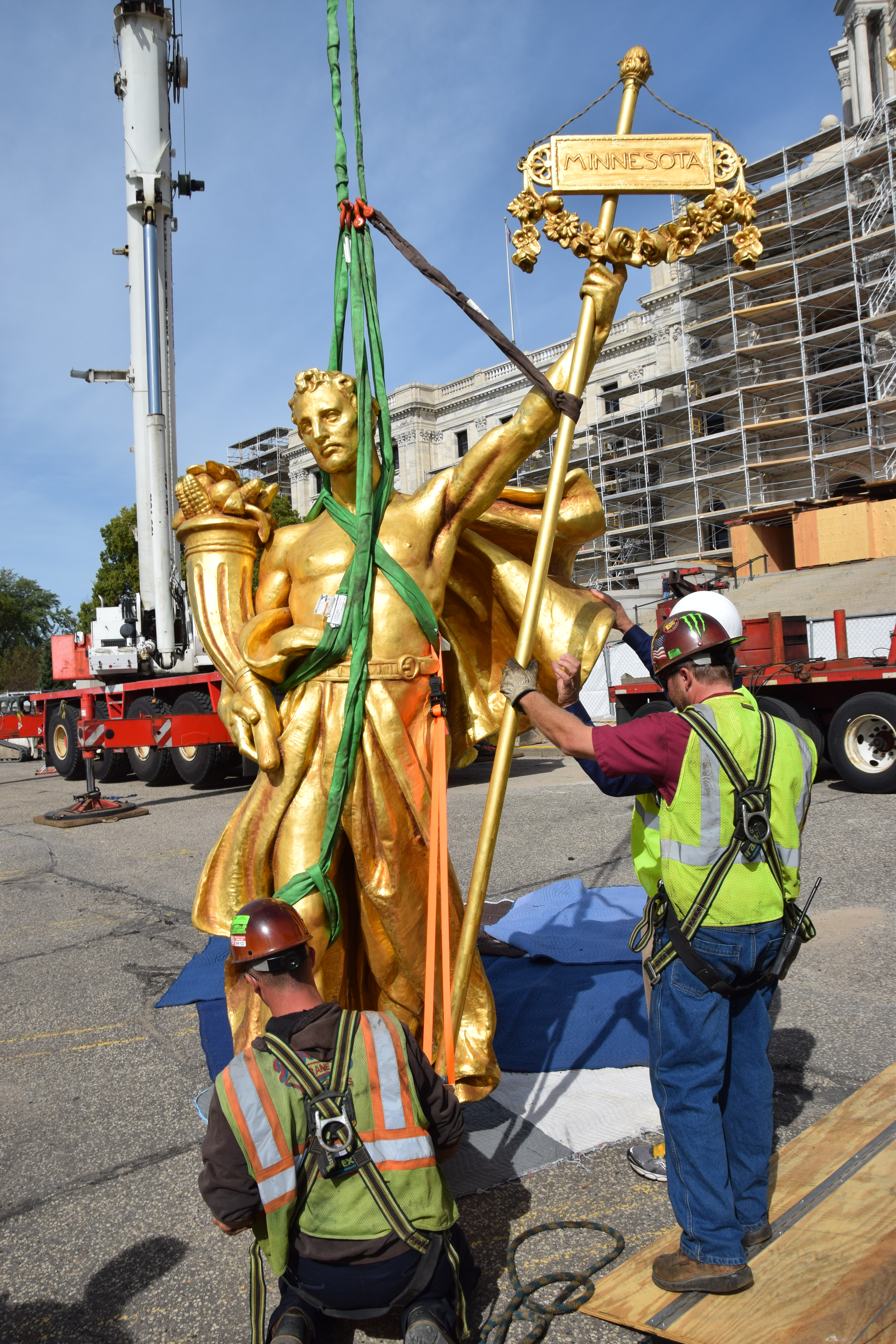
Removal of charioteer

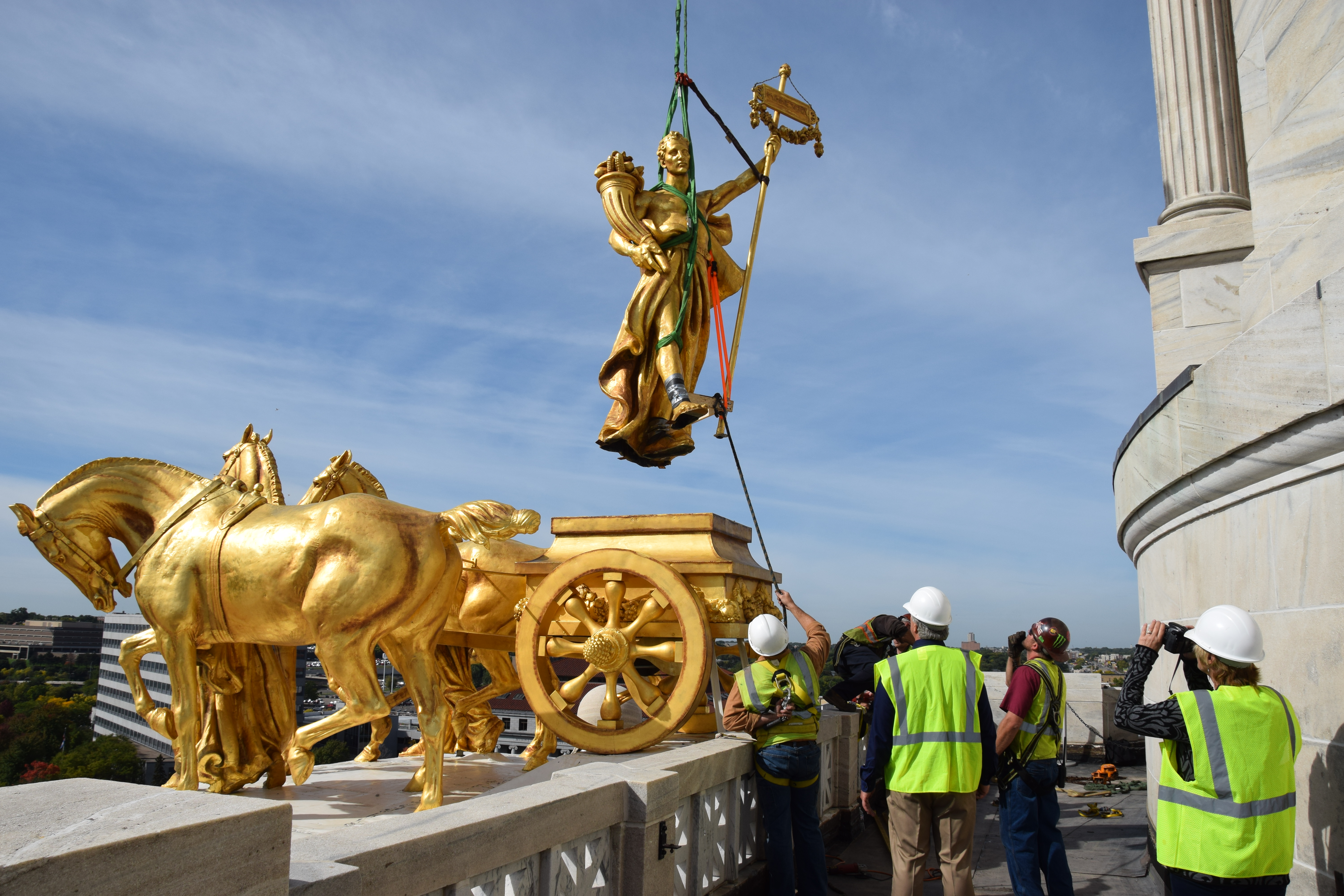
Removal of charioteer

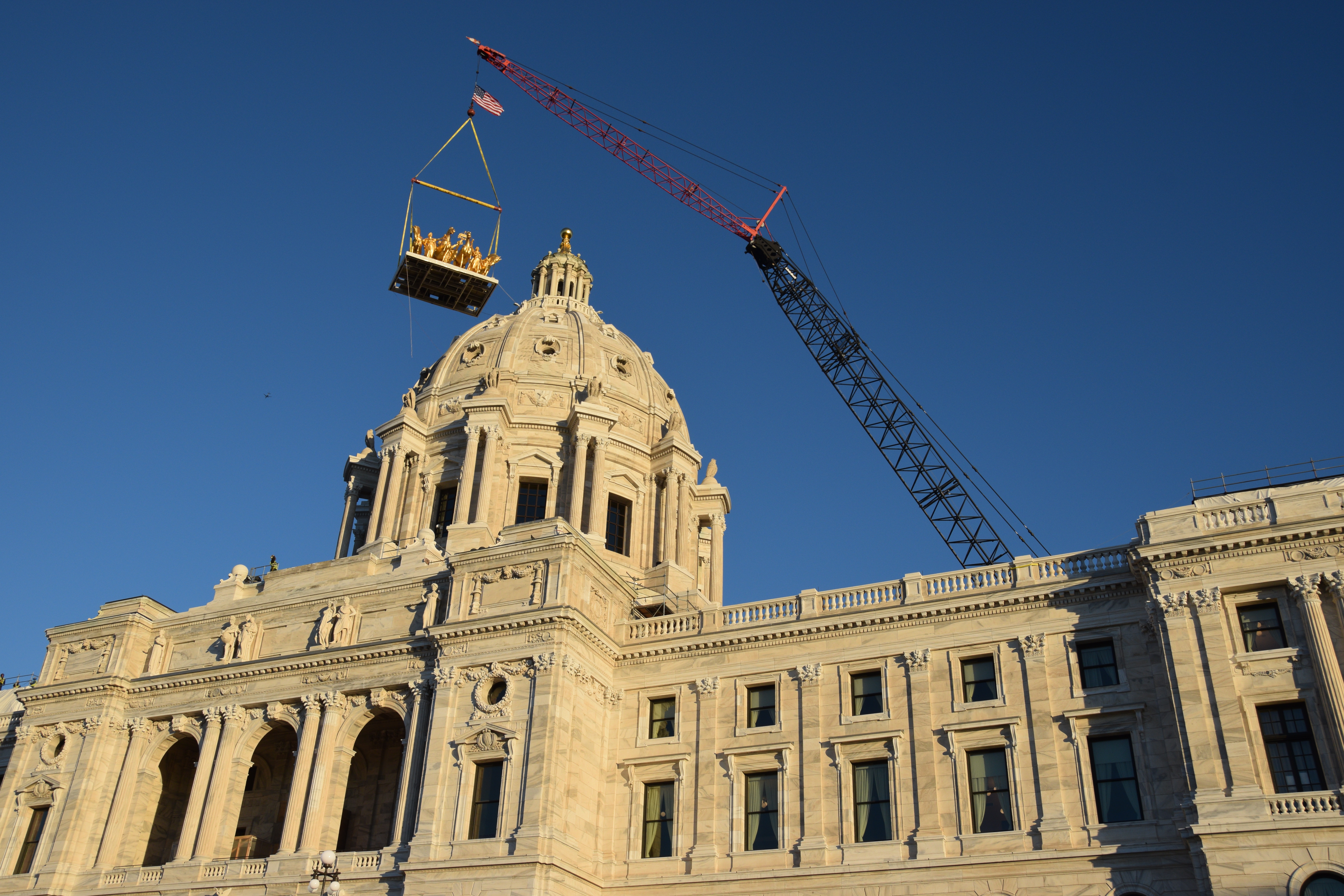
Statue being reinstalled

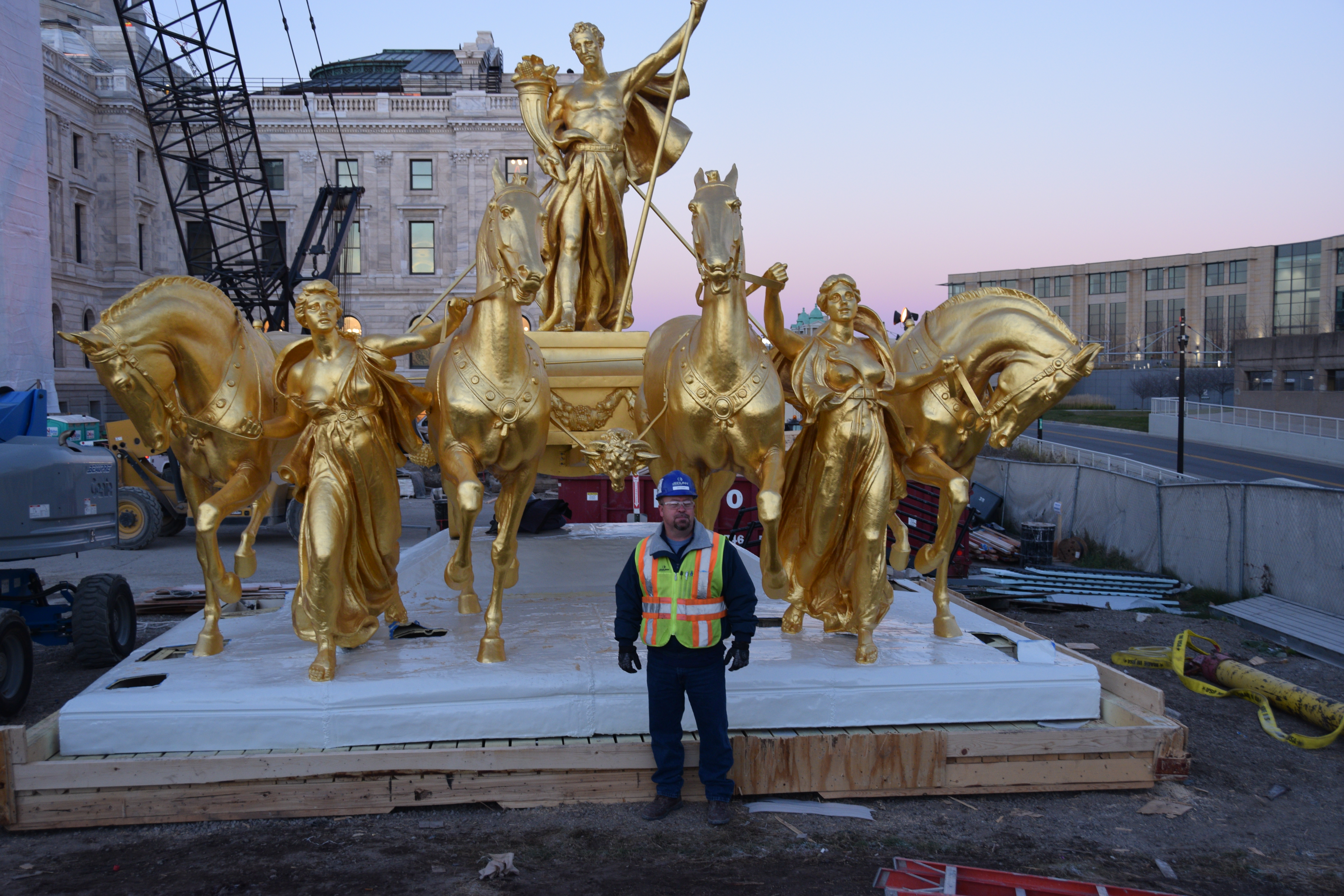
Being reinstalled
Gallery

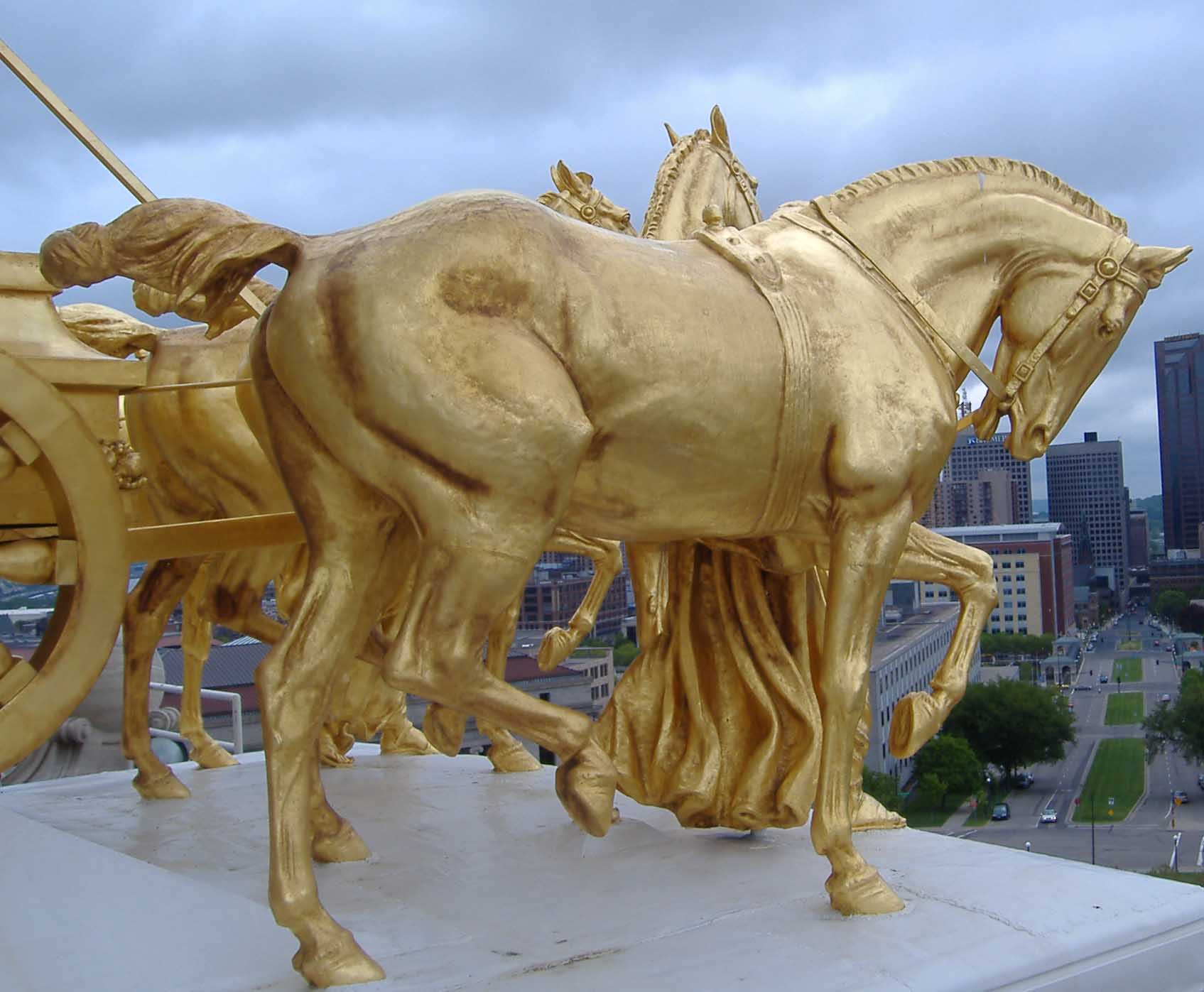
A closeup of the horses

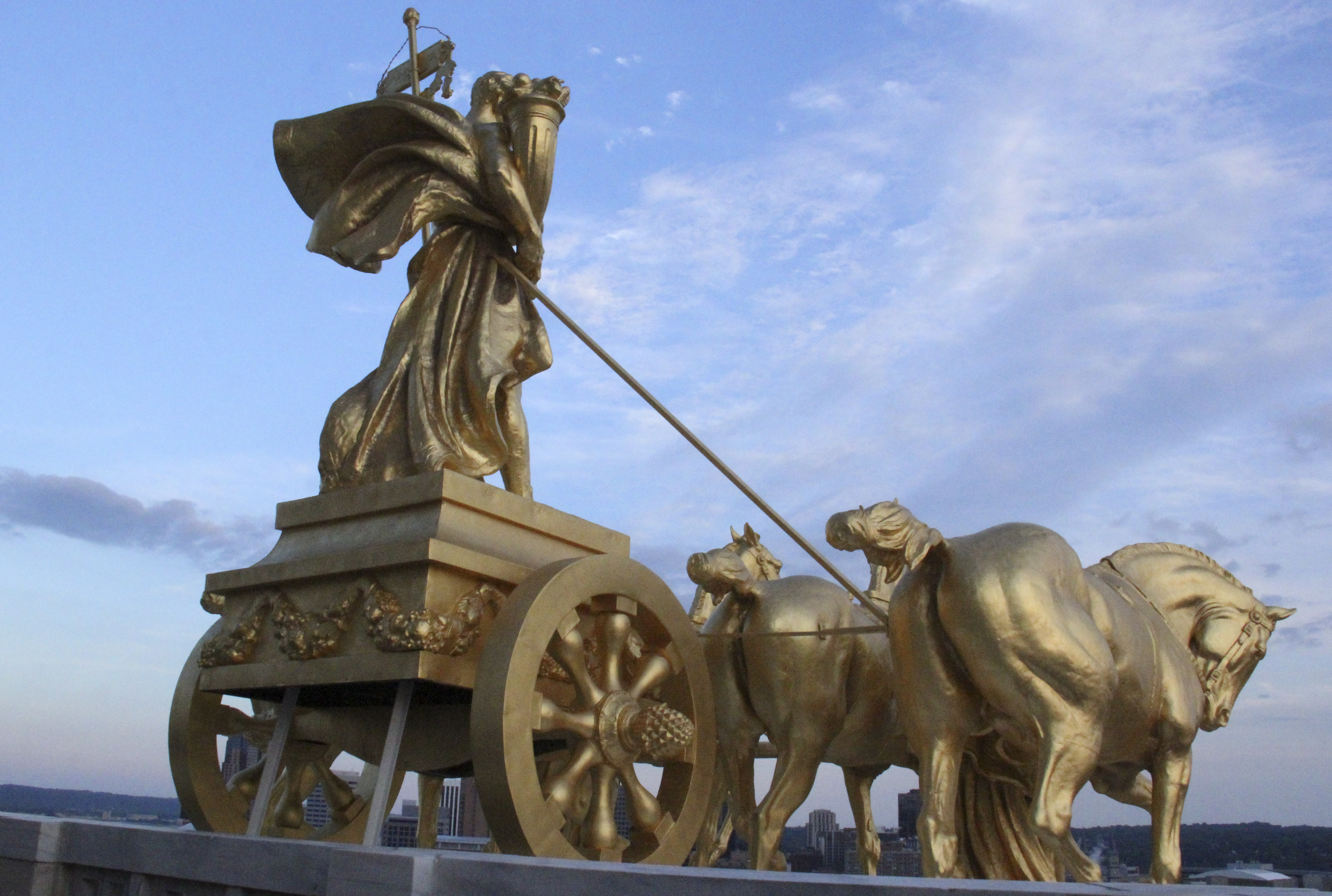
Looking East

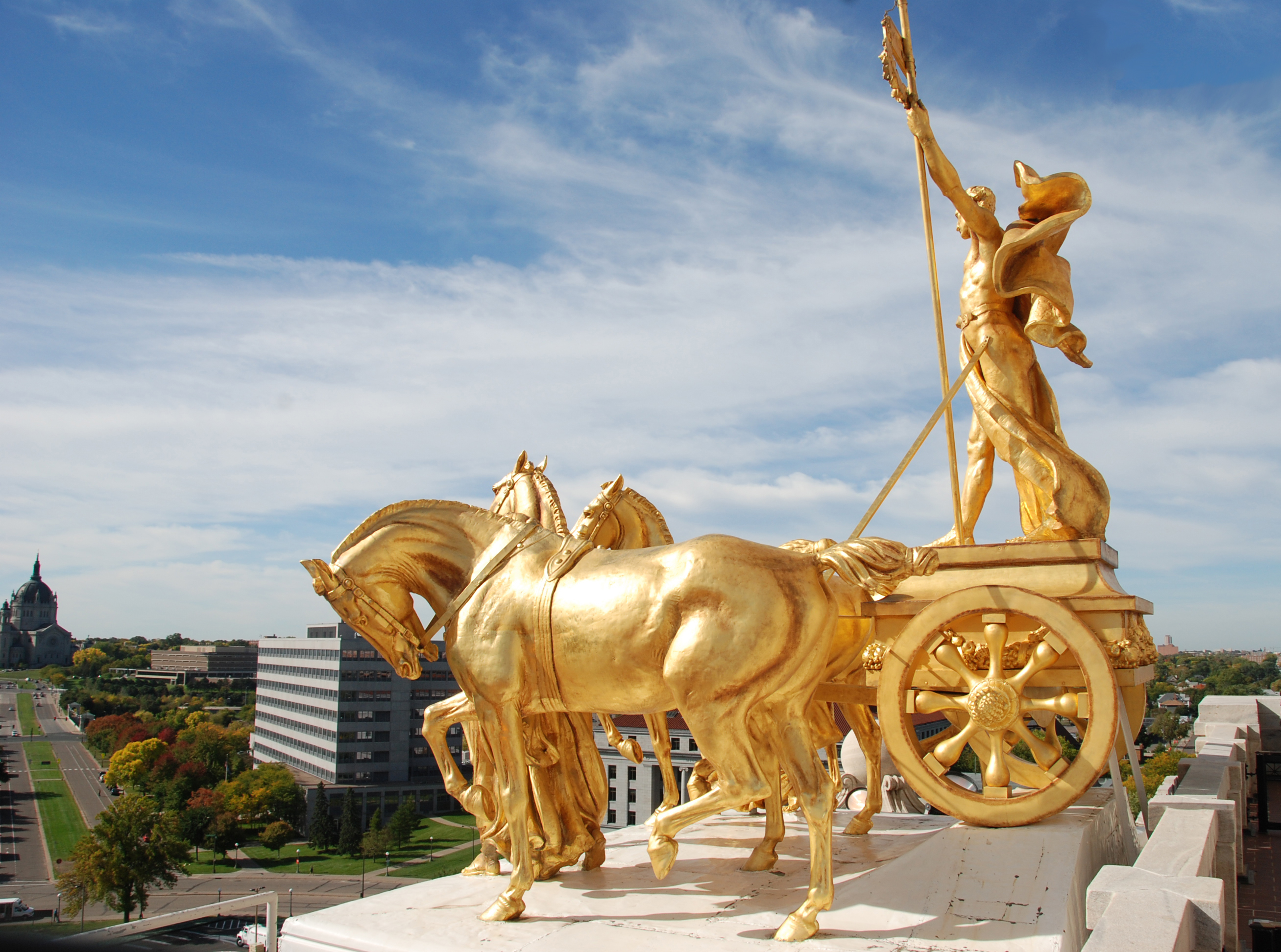
Looking West

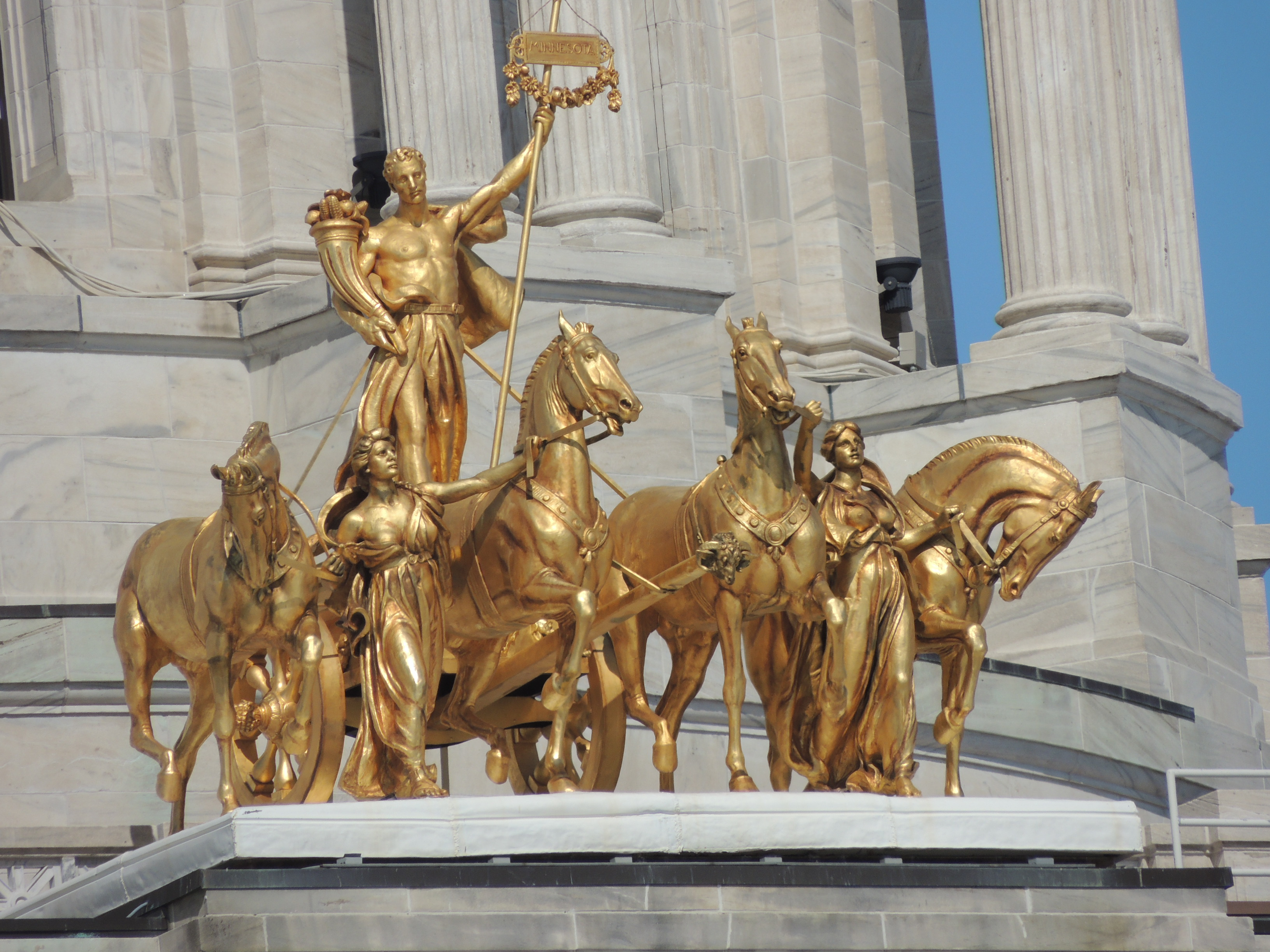

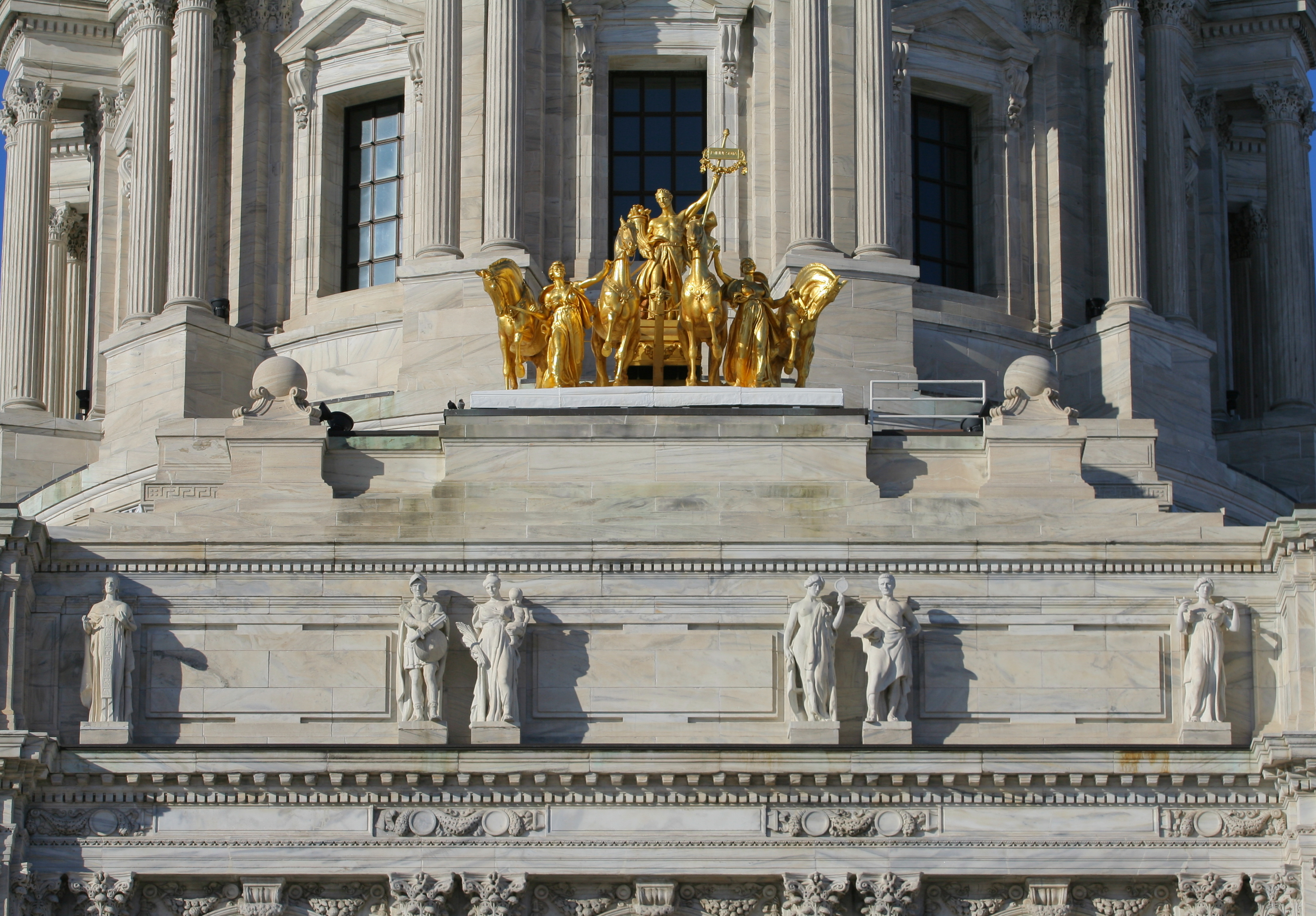
The Quadriga and the Six Virtues

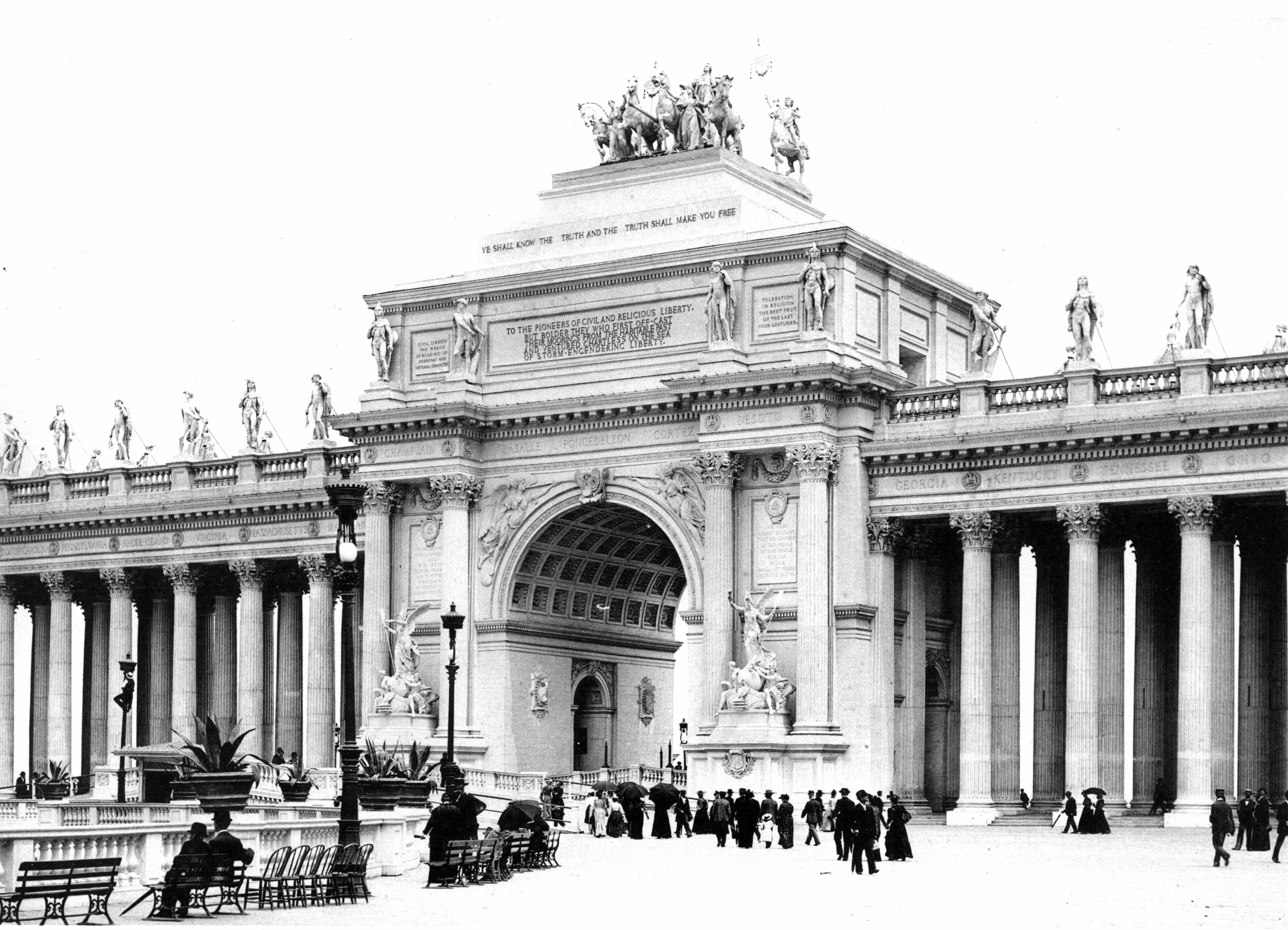
World's Columbian Exposition - Columbian Arch, and Columbus Quadriga

== See also ==
- Public sculptures by Daniel Chester French
- Minnesota State Capitol artwork
- List of artwork at the Minnesota State Capitol
