= Equestrian statue of George Washington (Chicago) =

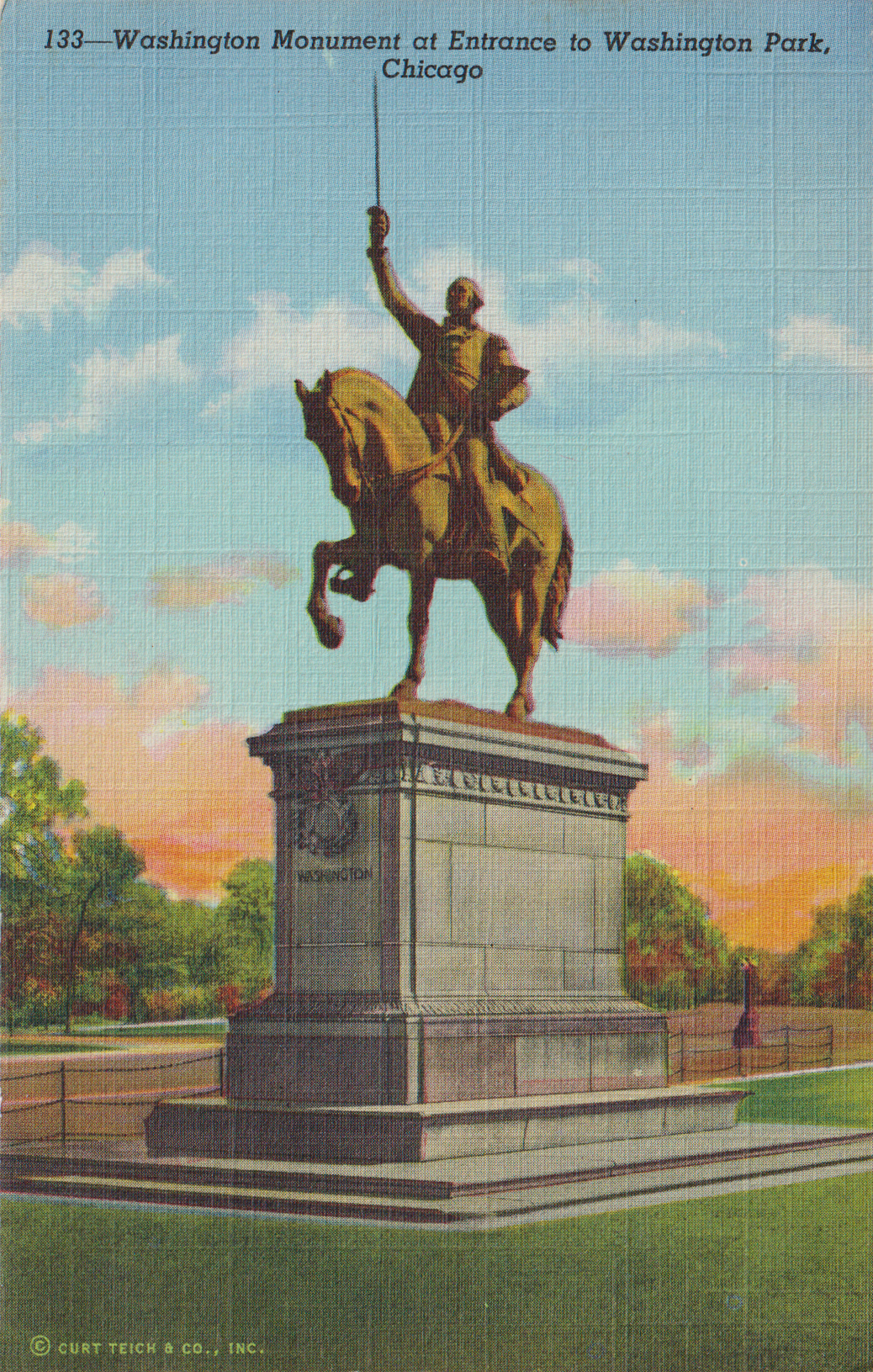
- Postcard of the George Washington Monument in Chicago
- Location: Chicago, Illinois, U.S.; 41°48′8.9″N 87°36′59.1″W

An equestrian statue of George Washington is installed in Chicago, Illinois, United States. It is a replica of a statue in Paris. The Chicago statue is also known as the George Washington Monument or the George Washington Memorial. It was dedicated on June 4, 1904, at the entrance to Washington Park. It was cast in 1903 by the Henry-Bonnard Bronze Company. The Chicago philanthropist Charles L. Hutchinson was inspired to install a statue of Washington in the park after he saw the original at French's studio. He then led the effort to fund the project.

== See also ==
- List of equestrian statues in the United States
- List of statues of George Washington
- Public sculptures by Daniel Chester French
