= Four Continents (French) =

Series of sculptures by Daniel Chester French in Manhattan, New York, U.S.

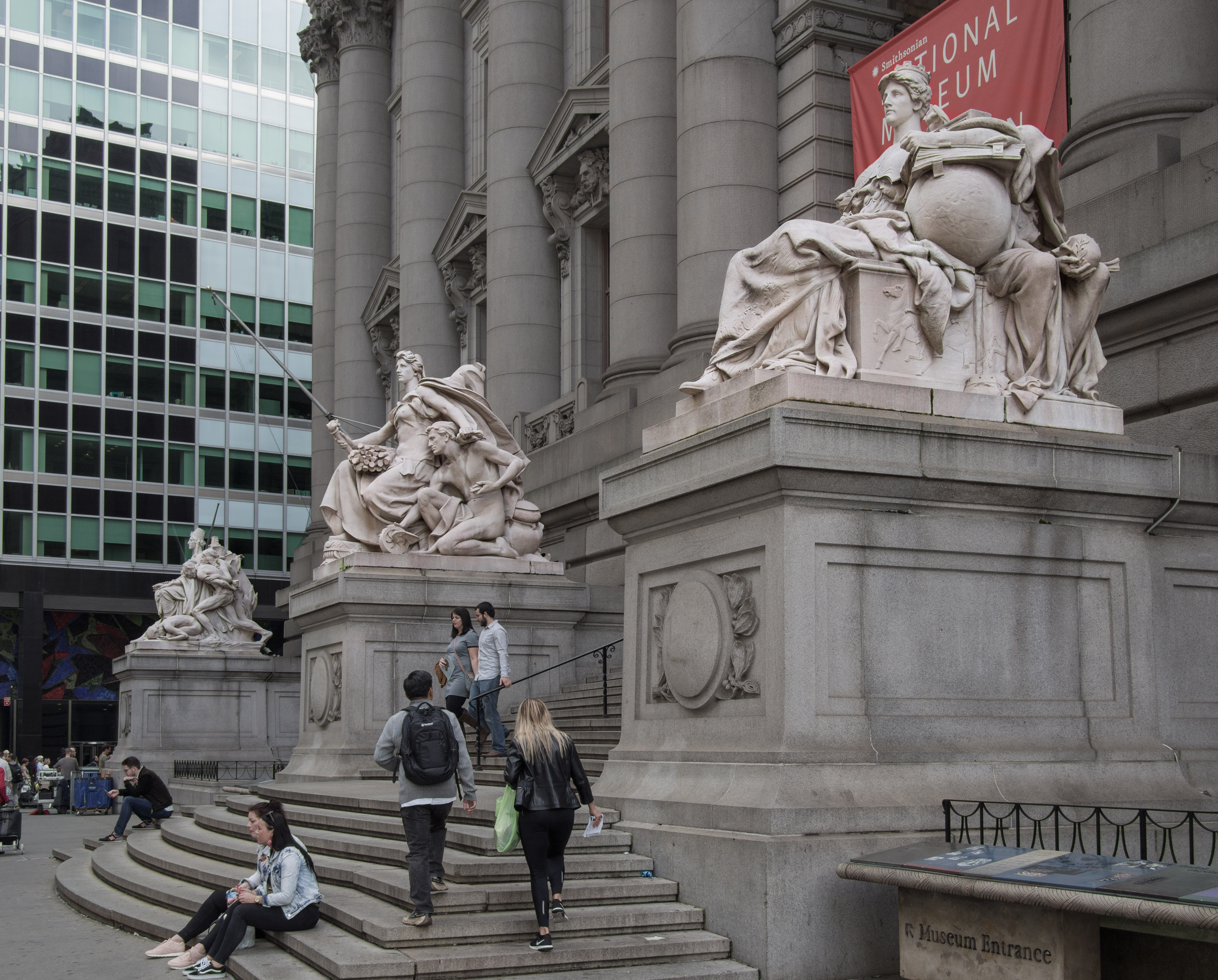
- Statues outside the Alexander Hamilton U.S. Custom House
- Artists: Daniel Chester French and Adolph Alexander Weinman
- Medium: Marble sculpture
- Location: New York City, New York, U.S.; 40°42′15″N 74°0′49″W

Four Continents is the collective name of four sculptures by Daniel Chester French, installed outside the Alexander Hamilton U.S. Custom House at Bowling Green in Manhattan, New York City. French performed the commissions with associate Adolph A. Weinman.

== Description and history ==
The work was made of marble and sculpted by the Piccirilli Brothers, with each sculptural group costing $13,500 (equivalent to $480,000 in 2025). The sculptures were first shown to the public in 1905. From east to west, the statues depict personifications of Asia, America, Europe, and Africa. The primary figures are female, but there are also auxiliary human figures flanking each primary figure. In addition, Asia's figure is paired with a tiger, and Africa's figure is paired with a lion.

== Gallery ==
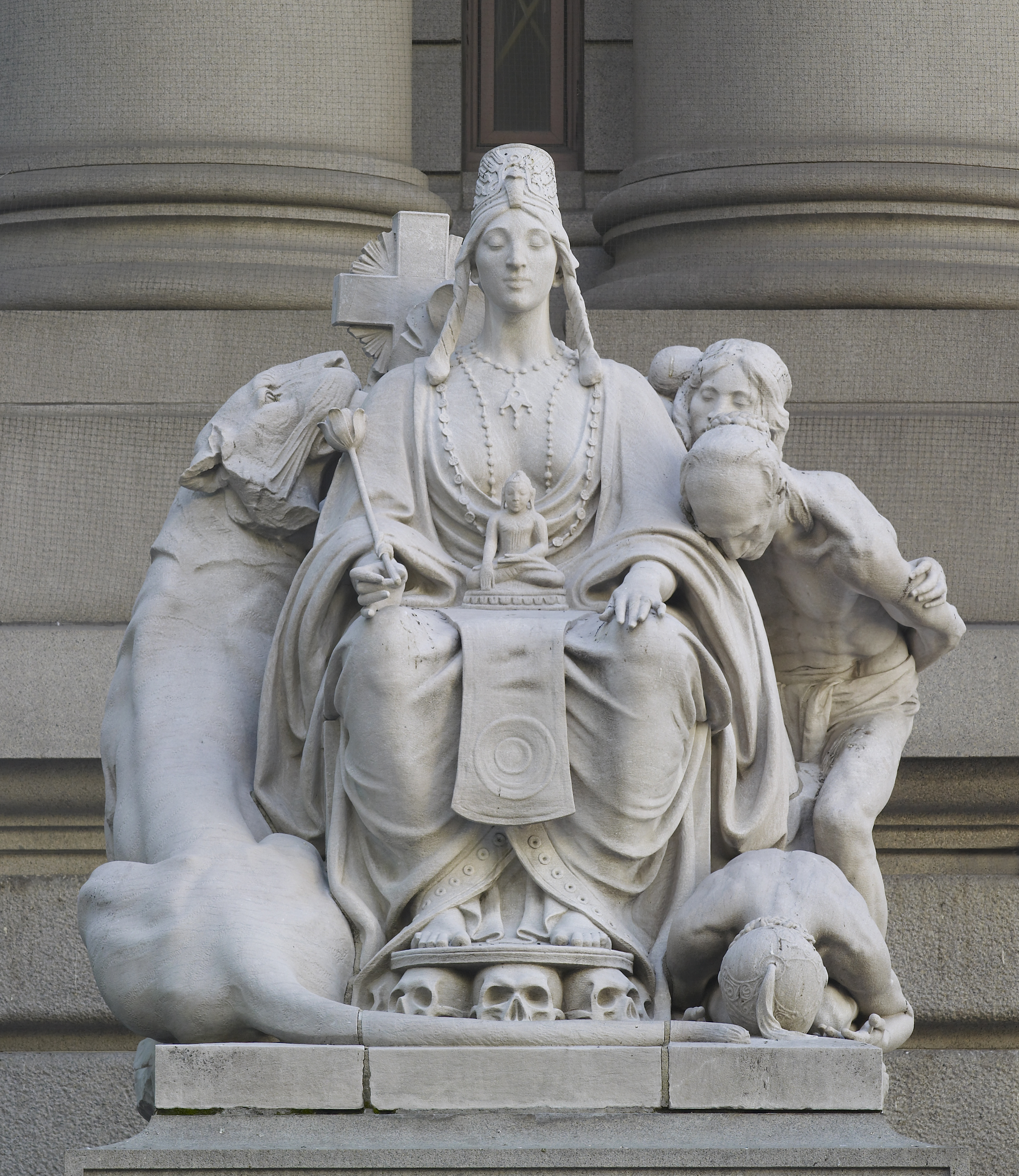
Asia

America

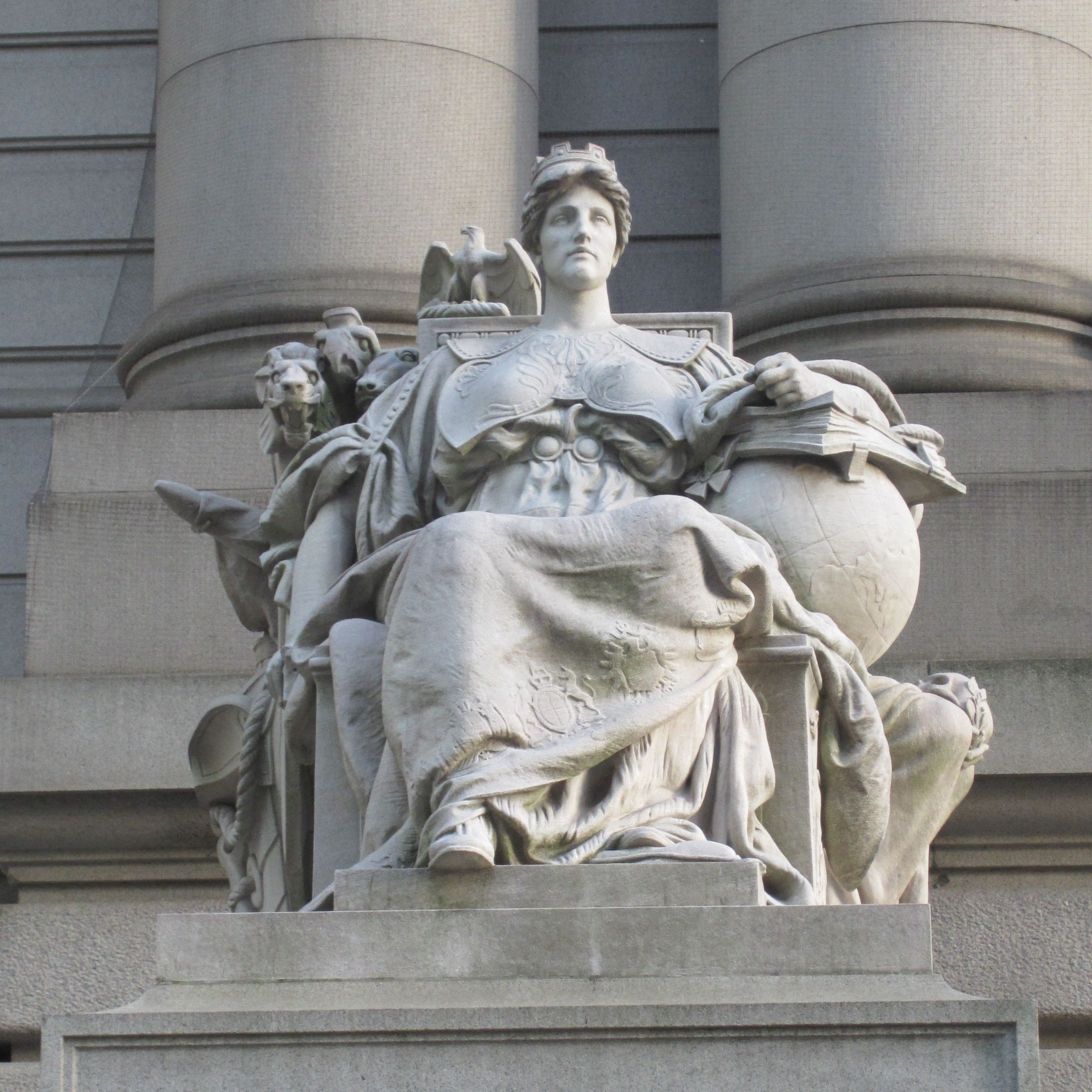
Europe

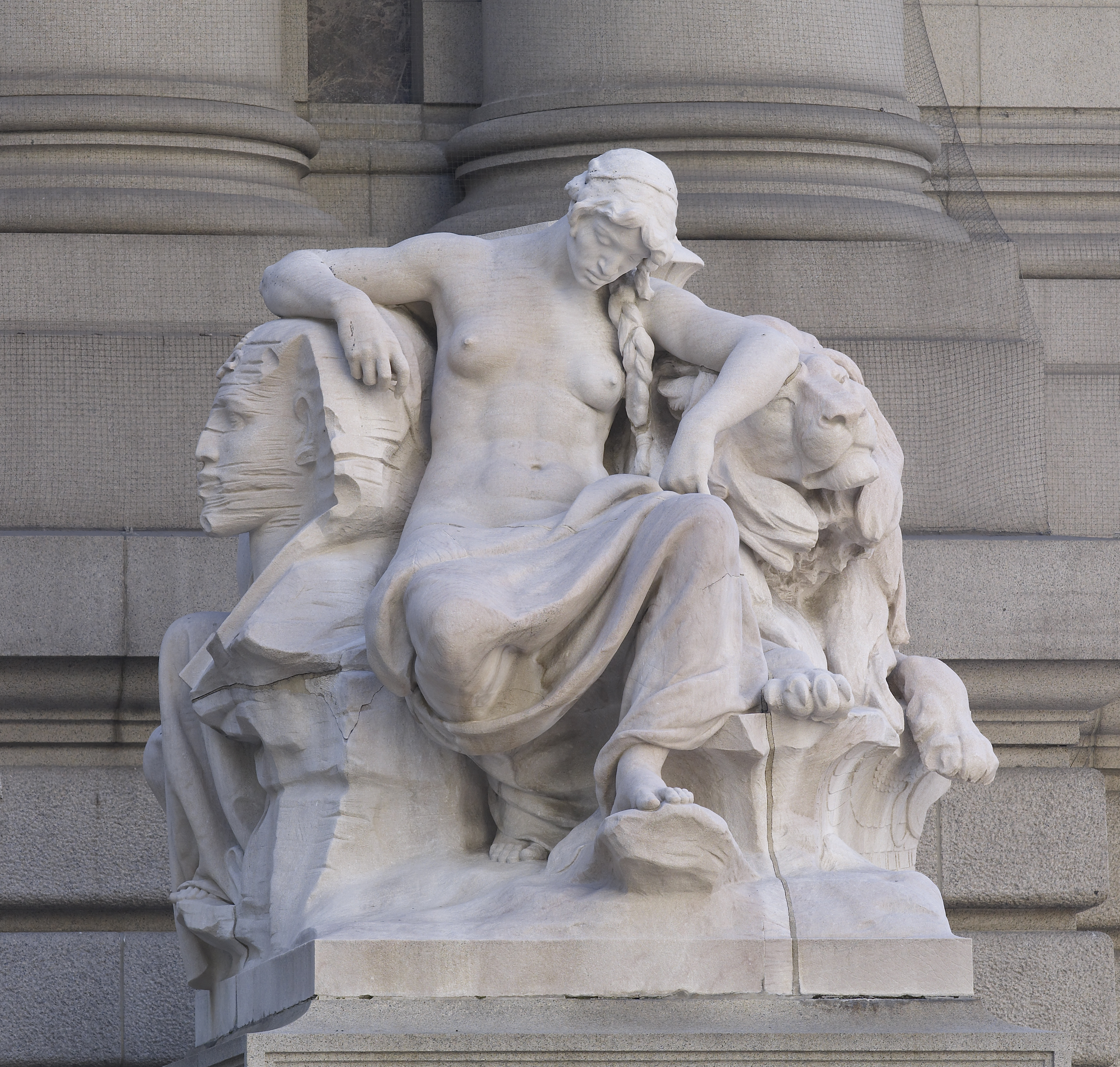
Africa

== See also ==
- Public sculptures by Daniel Chester French
