= Statue of Thomas Starr King (Sacramento, California) =

Sculpture by Haig Patigian

Thomas Starr King
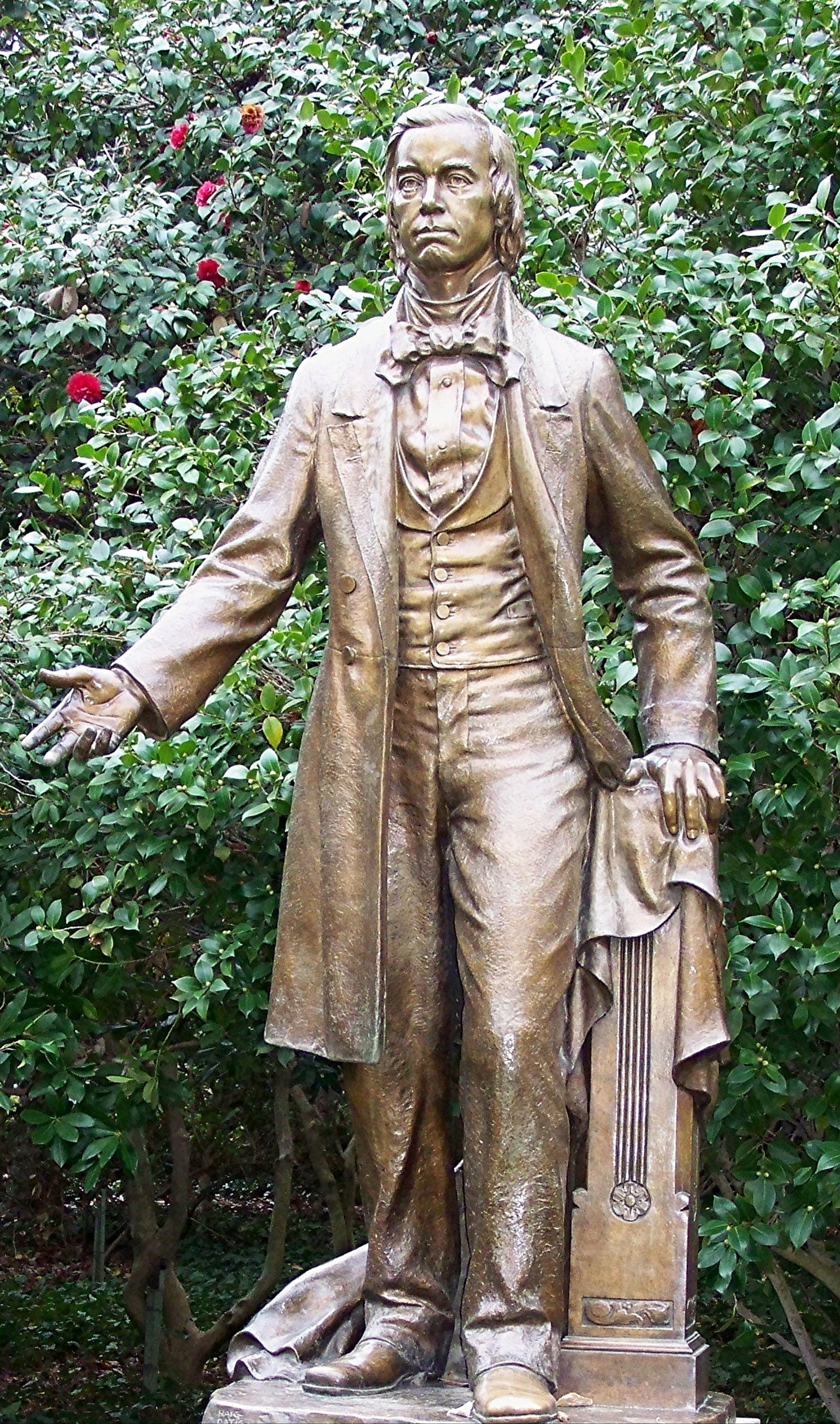
- Artist: Haig Patigian
- Subject: Thomas Starr King

A statue of the American minister Thomas Starr King by Haig Patigian stands in Sacramento, California, in the grounds of the California State Capitol. From 1931 until 2009, it was one of two statues representing the state of California in the National Statuary Hall Collection, in the United States Capitol, Washington, D.C.

In 2006, the California State Legislature approved a joint resolution to replace King's statue in Statuary Hall with a statue of Ronald Reagan. The resolution was authored by Republican State Senator Dennis Hollingsworth, who stated the reason for the resolution as follows: "To be honest with you, I wasn't sure who Thomas Starr King was, and I think there's probably a lot of Californians like me." As a result of this resolution, King's statue was removed from Statuary Hall, and that of Ronald Reagan was unveiled in the United States Capitol rotunda on June 3, 2009. King's statue was reinstalled within the Civil War Memorial Grove in Capitol Park, and was formally dedicated in a ceremony held on December 8, 2009.

== See also ==
- Statue of Thomas Starr King (San Francisco)
