= John Boyle O'Reilly Memorial =

Sculpture in Boston, Massachusetts, U.S.

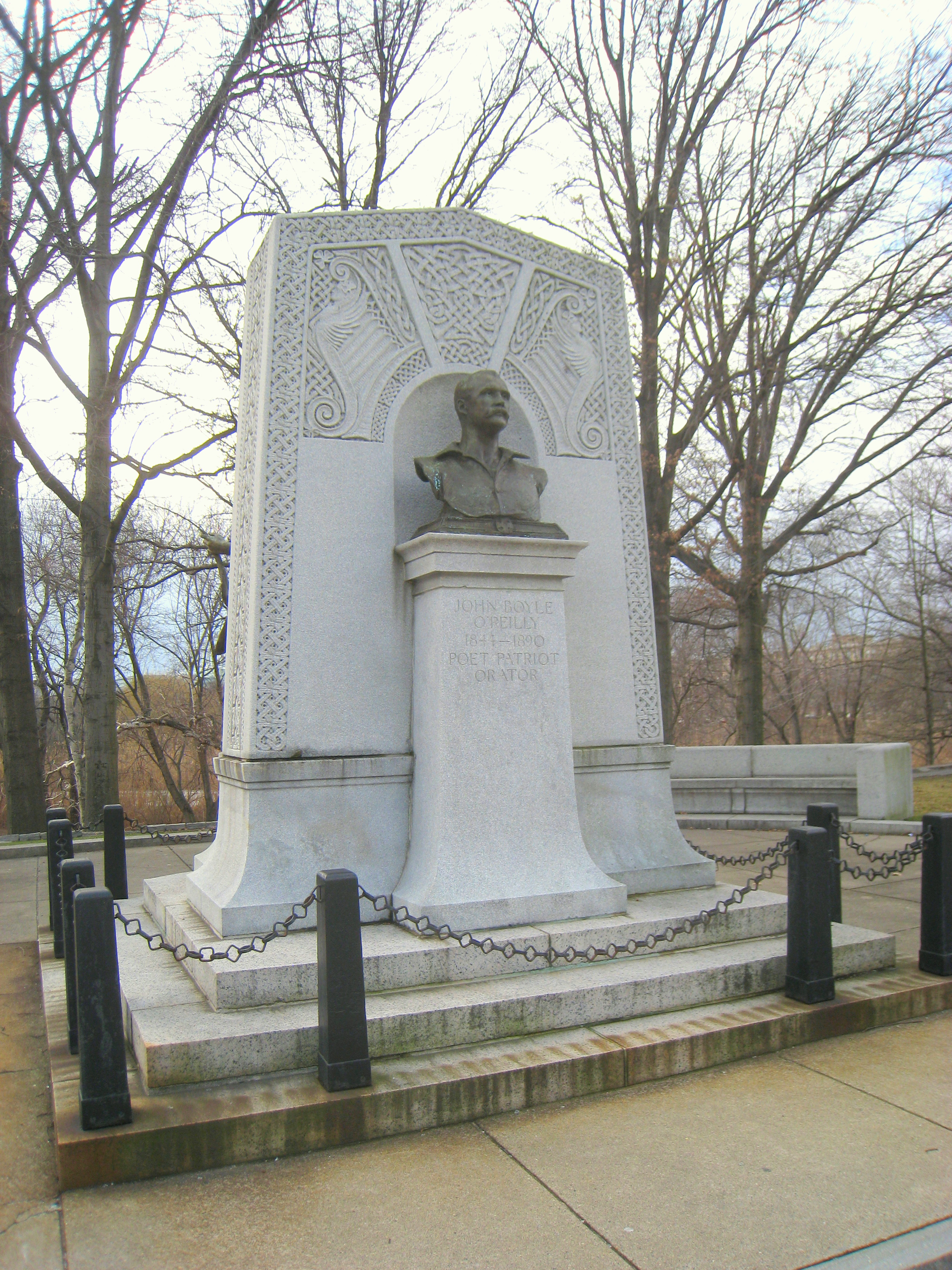
- Artist: Daniel Chester French
- Year: 1896
- Medium: Bronze; granite
- Subject: John Boyle O’Reilly
- Location: Boston, Massachusetts, U.S.; 42°20′46.6″N 71°5′27.8″W

The John Boyle O'Reilly Memorial by Daniel Chester French is a memorial installed along Boston's Fenway, near the intersection of Boylston Street, in the U.S. state of Massachusetts. It was created in 1896 to honor Irish-born writer and activist John Boyle O'Reilly not long after his death in 1890.

== Description ==
The memorial features a bronze bust of writer and activist John Boyle O'Reilly and a bronze allegorical figure group depicting Erin seated between her sons Patriotism and Poetry. The bust measures approximately 2 ft. 9 in. x 2 ft. 3 in. x 1 ft. 4 in., and the figure group measures approximately 6 ft. x 7 ft. x 3 ft. 6 in. The Barre granite wall is approximately 10 ft. tall and 6 ft., 6 in. wide, and the base is made of Milford pink granite.

== History ==
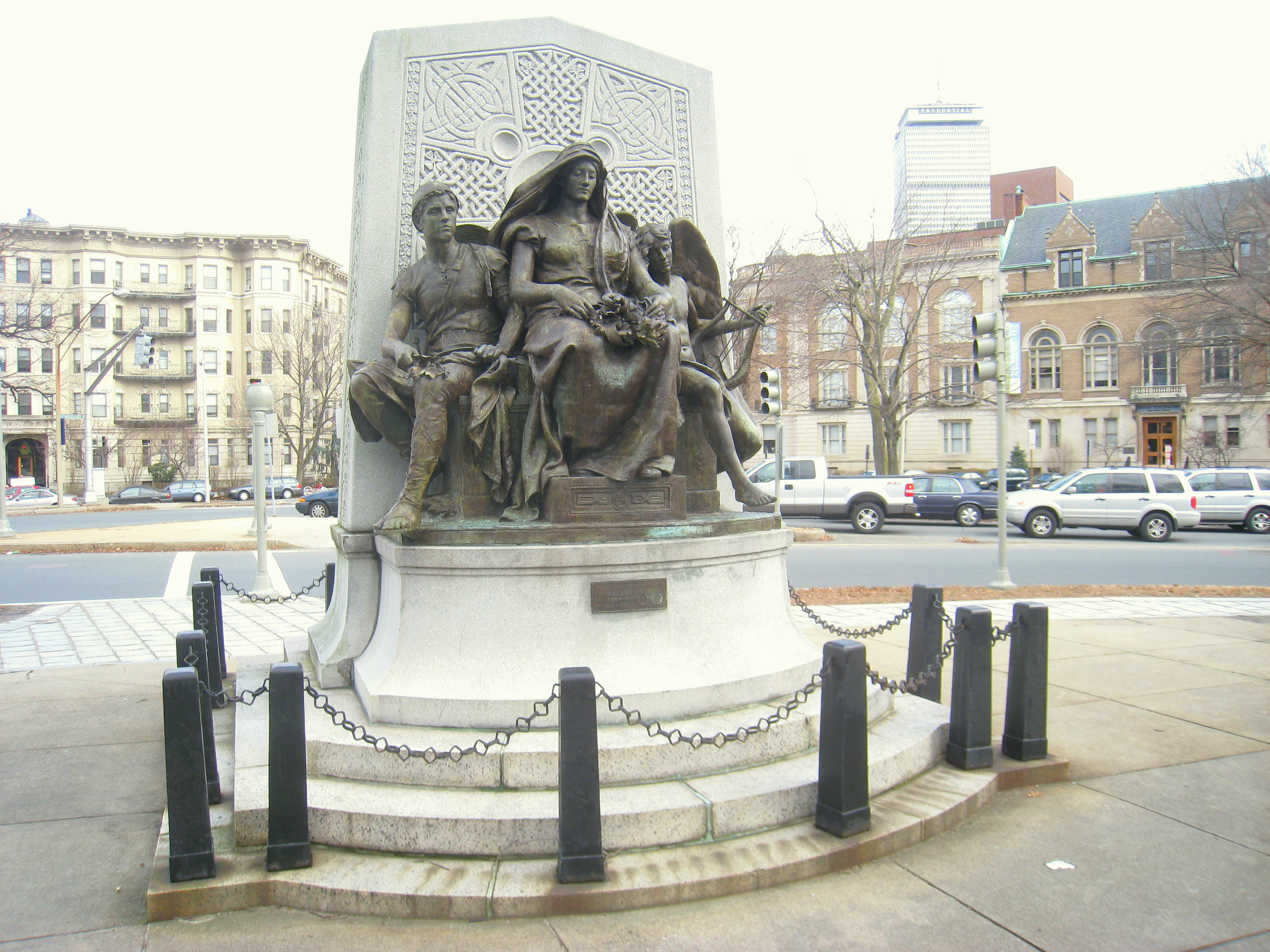
The memorial in 2009

John Boyle O'Reilly was a popular writer who had helped create the image of Boston as a place full of Irish people and culture and invited Irish luminaries like Oscar Wilde to the city and hosted fundraising rallies for Irish revolutionaries like Charles Stewart Parnell. His sudden death at age 46 on August 10, 1890, shocked his admirers and friends, who soon raised $22,000 for a memorial after a mass meeting at Tremont Temple. The John Boyle O'Reilly Memorial Committee selected Daniel Chester French as the sculptor without opening the commission up to competition and directed him to create "a suitable memorial to the genius and manhood of John Boyle O'Reilly. O'Reilly invited Charles Howard Walker to collaborate on the architectural aspect of the design.

Upon viewing the initial design, O'Reilly's widow "expressed great admiration and delight in the sculptor's conception", according to one report. The Committee accepted the design in September 1893, granting French final authority on any changes, and requested its completion within two years. Instead, French took closer to three years while he updated several details in the design, including adding armor to the figure of Patriotism, who was originally nude, and exchanging a harp for a lute for the figure of Poetry. Sculptor Lorado Taft, who saw the work in progress at French's studio, said of the design, "it is magnificent" and that it was "wonderful art" that concealed more art.

The memorial was cast in 1896 and unveiled on June 20 of that year. It was surveyed by the Smithsonian Institution's "Save Outdoor Sculpture!" program in 1993.

== See also ==
- Public sculptures by Daniel Chester French
