= Statue of Thomas Starr King (San Francisco) =

Statue by Daniel Chester French in California, U.S.

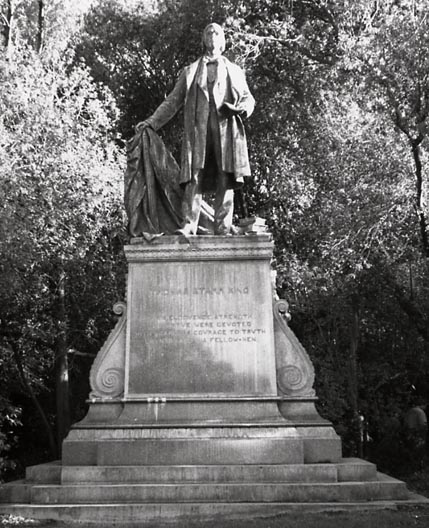
- Artist: Daniel Chester French
- Medium: Bronze; Granite
- Movement: Sculpture
- Subject: Thomas Starr King
- Location: San Francisco; 37.77229°N 122.46629°W

A statue of Thomas Starr King by Daniel Chester French is installed in San Francisco's Golden Gate Park, in the U.S. state of California.

The 1892 statue is made of bronze and has a granite base.

== Inscription ==
The following inscription is on the front of the statue:

THOMAS STARR KING

IN HIM ELOQVENCE, STRENGTH

AND VIRTVE WERE DEVOTED

WITH FEARLESS COVRAGE TO TRVTH

COVNTRY AND HIS FELLOW-MEN

1824–1864

== See also ==
- Public sculptures by Daniel Chester French
- Statue of Thomas Starr King (Sacramento, California)
