= Equestrian statue of George Washington (Paris) =

1900 sculpture by Daniel Chester French and Edward Clark Potter in Paris

George Washington
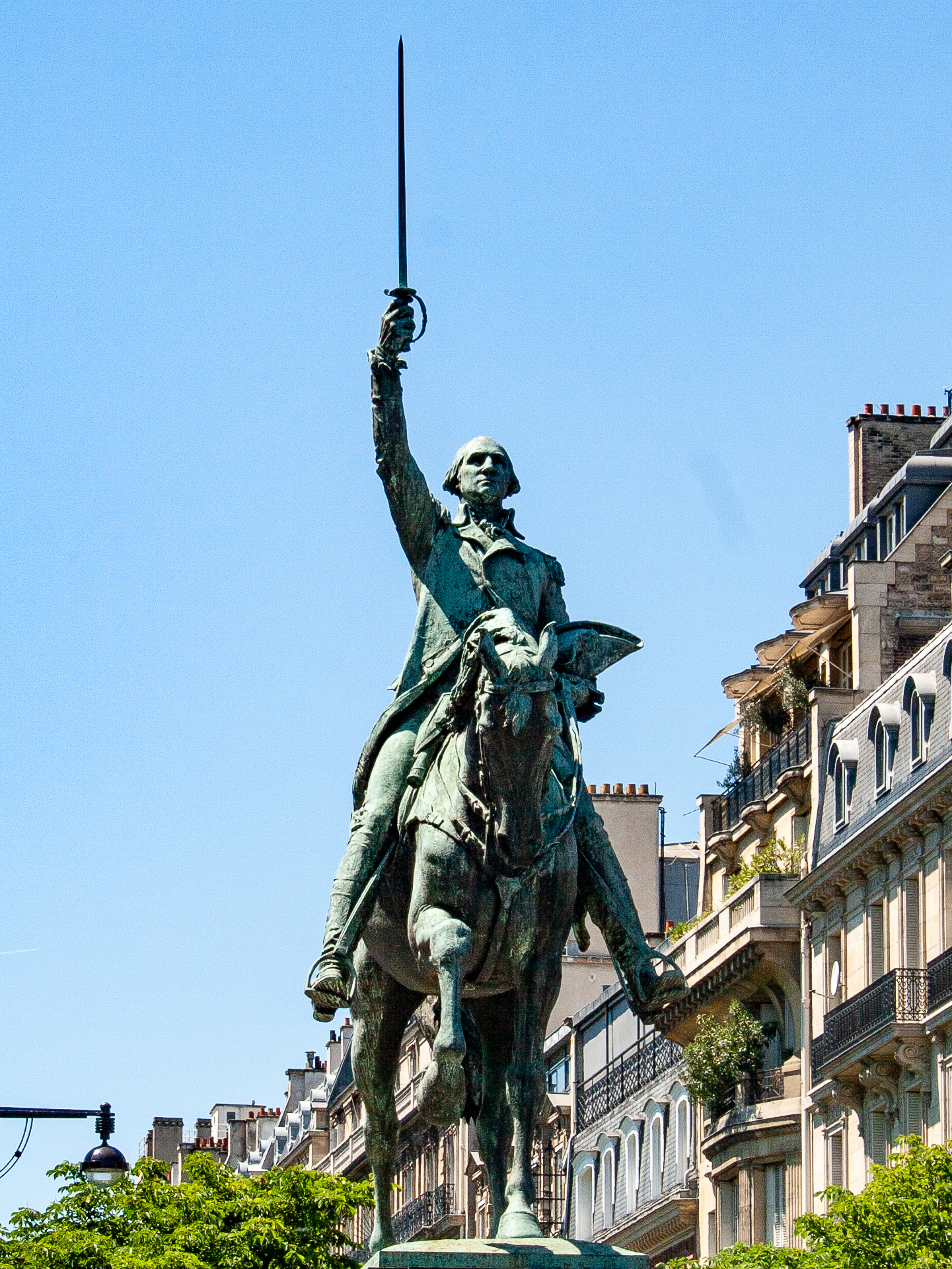
- George Washington by Daniel Chester French and Edward Clark Potter in Paris
- Artist: Daniel Chester French; Edward Clark Potter
- Year: 1900, dedicated July 3, 1900
- Medium: Bronze sculpture
- Subject: George Washington
- Location: Place d'Iéna, Paris; 48°51′53″N 2°17′38″E

George Washington is a 1900 outdoor bronze equestrian statue by the American sculptors Daniel Chester French and Edward Clark Potter located in the center of the Place d'Iéna in the 16th arrondissement of Paris, France. The statue of George Washington was sculpted by French and the horse by Potter. It was dedicated on July 3, 1900, 125 years after General Washington took command of the Continental Army at Cambridge, Massachusetts, U.S., on July 3, 1775, during the American Revolutionary War. A gift from the women of America, the statue was presented to the city by the Daughters of the American Revolution.

== History ==
The Association of American Women for the Presentation of a Statue of Washington to France was incorporated in 1897. They sought to erect the statue in time for the Paris Exposition of 1900. Later that year, after the Association had raised the necessary funds, French started work on the statue at his studio, Chesterwood, in Stockbridge, Massachusetts. Potter provided the horse for Washington.

== Description ==
Washington is dressed in full military uniform. He holds a sword up in the air with his right hand and the reins of the horse in his left hand. Washington's head is modeled after a life-cast by the French sculptor Jean-Antoine Houdon. The statue was cast by the Henry-Bonnard Bronze Company in New York City. The pedestal was designed by the American architect Charles F. McKim and made from Milford granite and Knoxville marble.

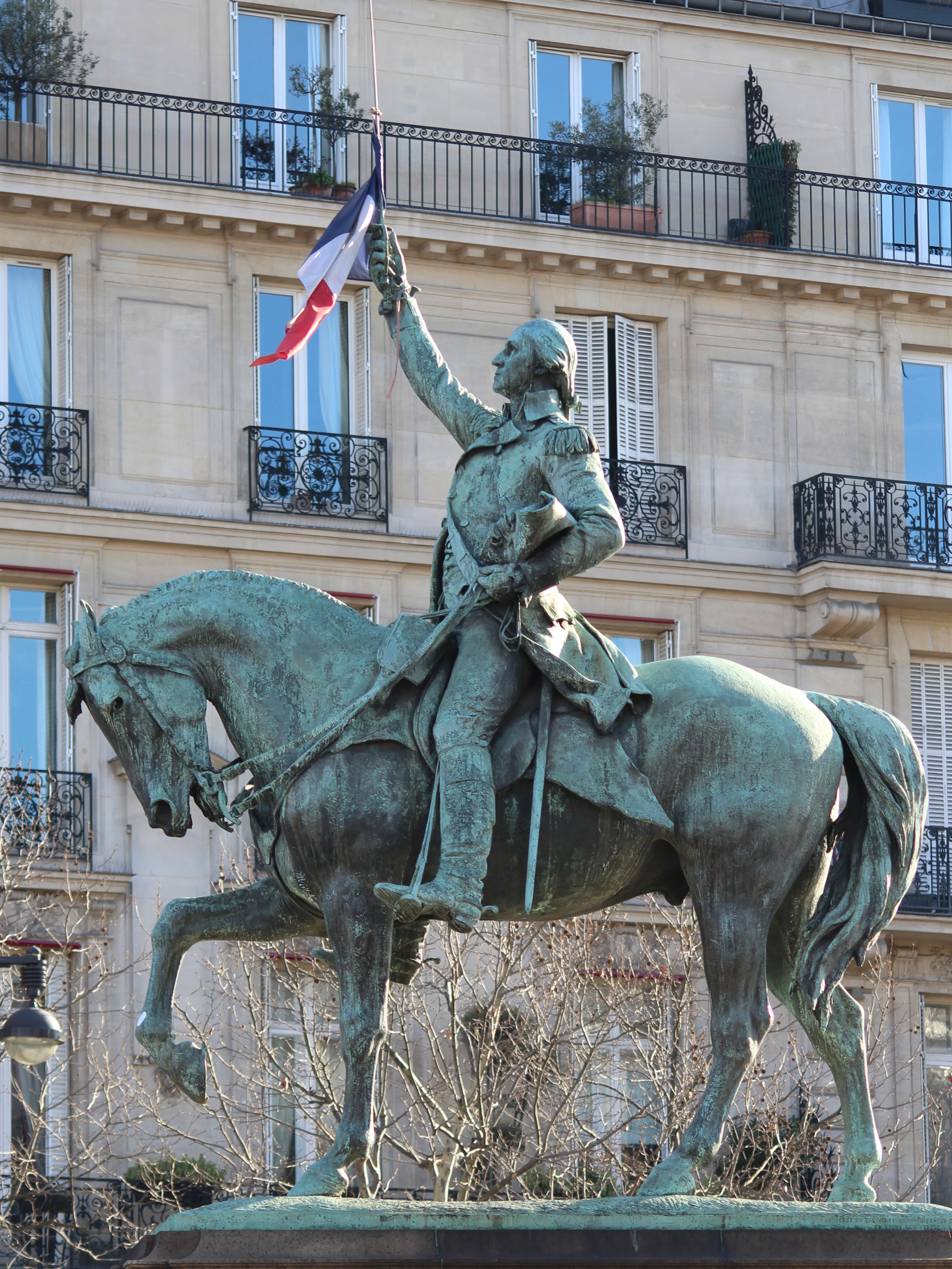
Profile view

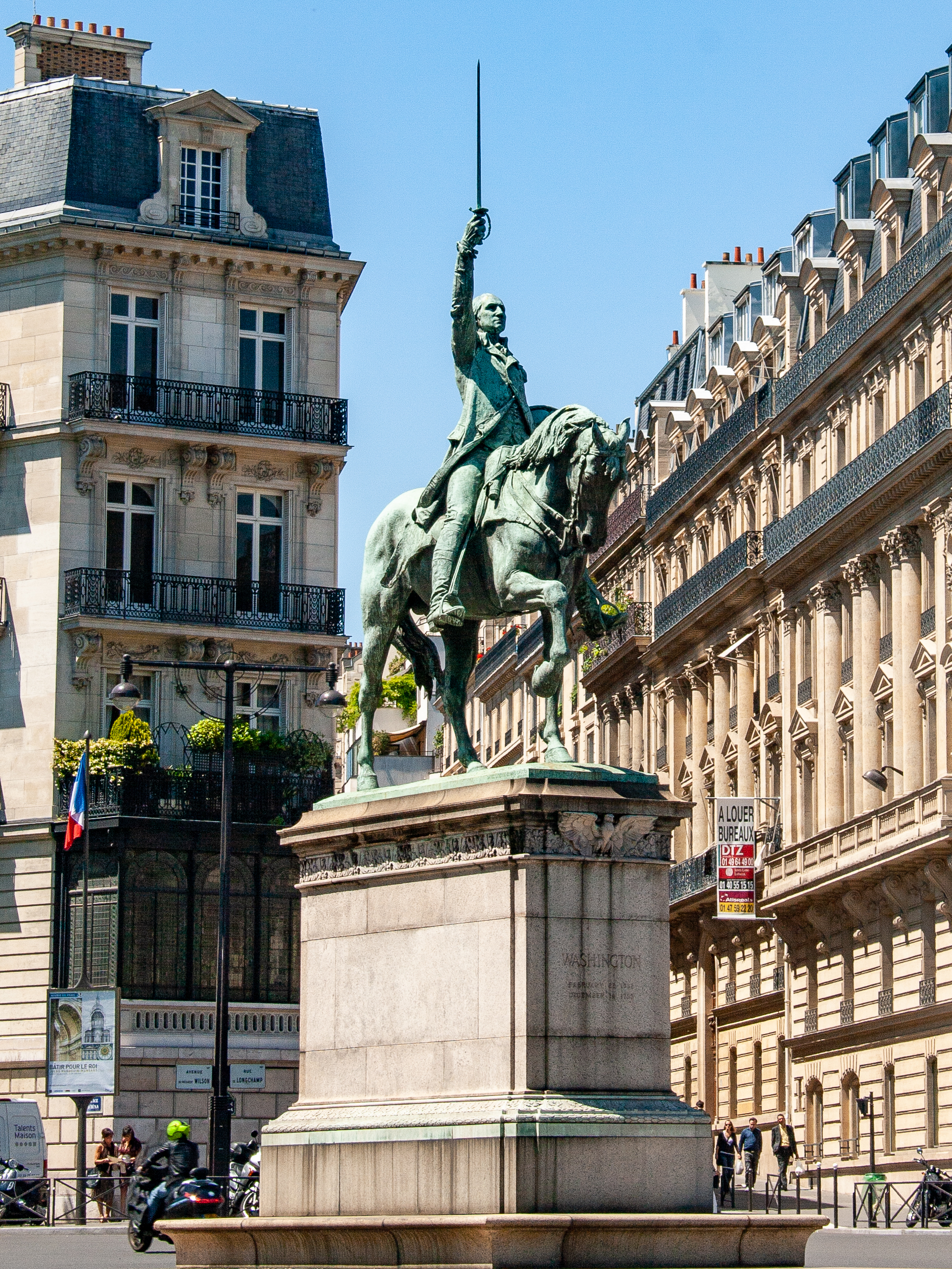
Statue on the pedestal

The inscription, in French, is on the base of the pedestal, facing the Guimet Museum.

French inscription

Offert par les femmes des États-Unis d'Amérique en mémoire de l'amitié et l'aide fraternelle données par la France à leurs pères pendant leur lutte pour l'indépendance

Translation:
English translation

Given by the women of the United States of America in memory of the friendship and brotherly aid given by France to their ancestors during their battle for independence

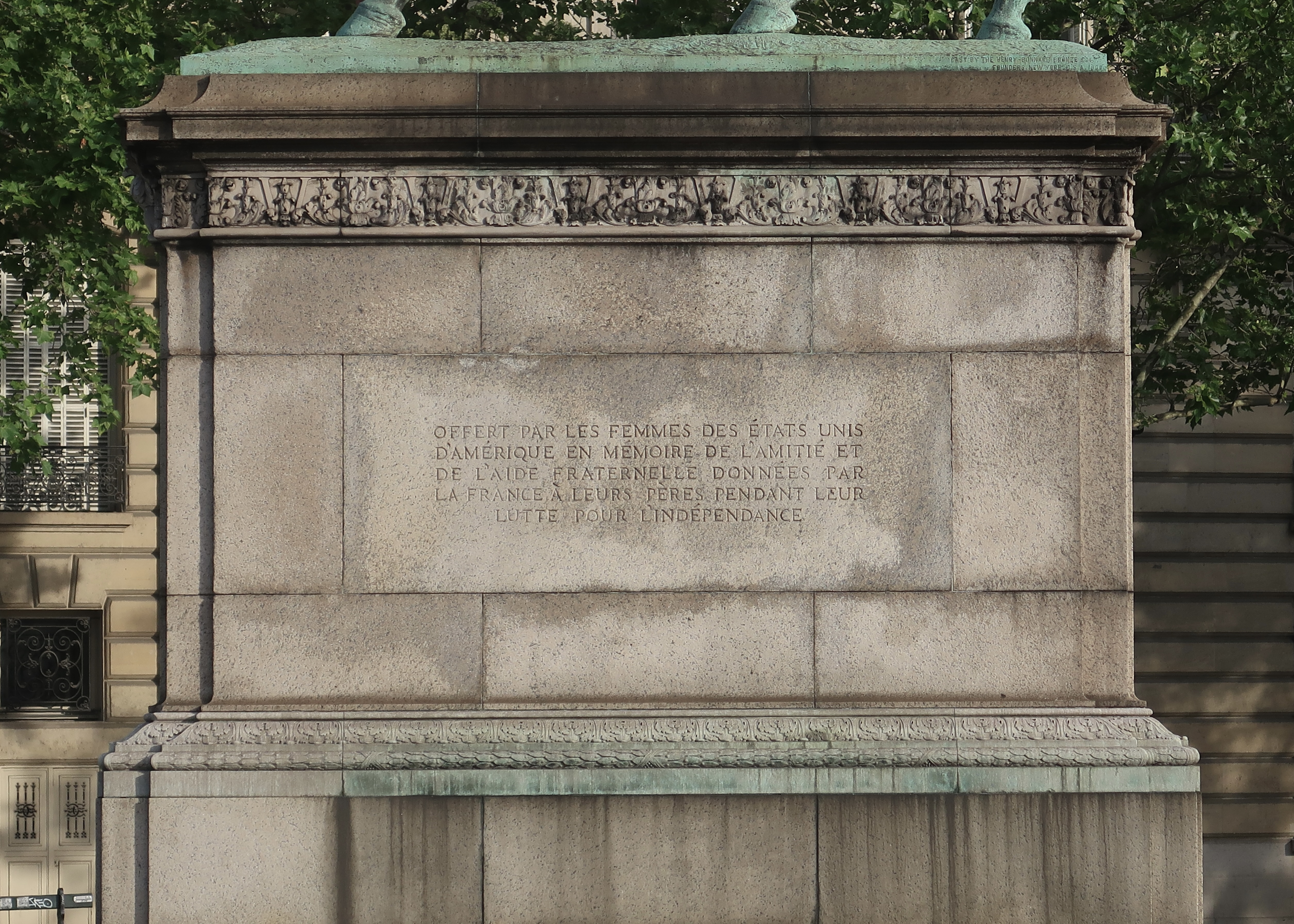
French inscription on the pedestal

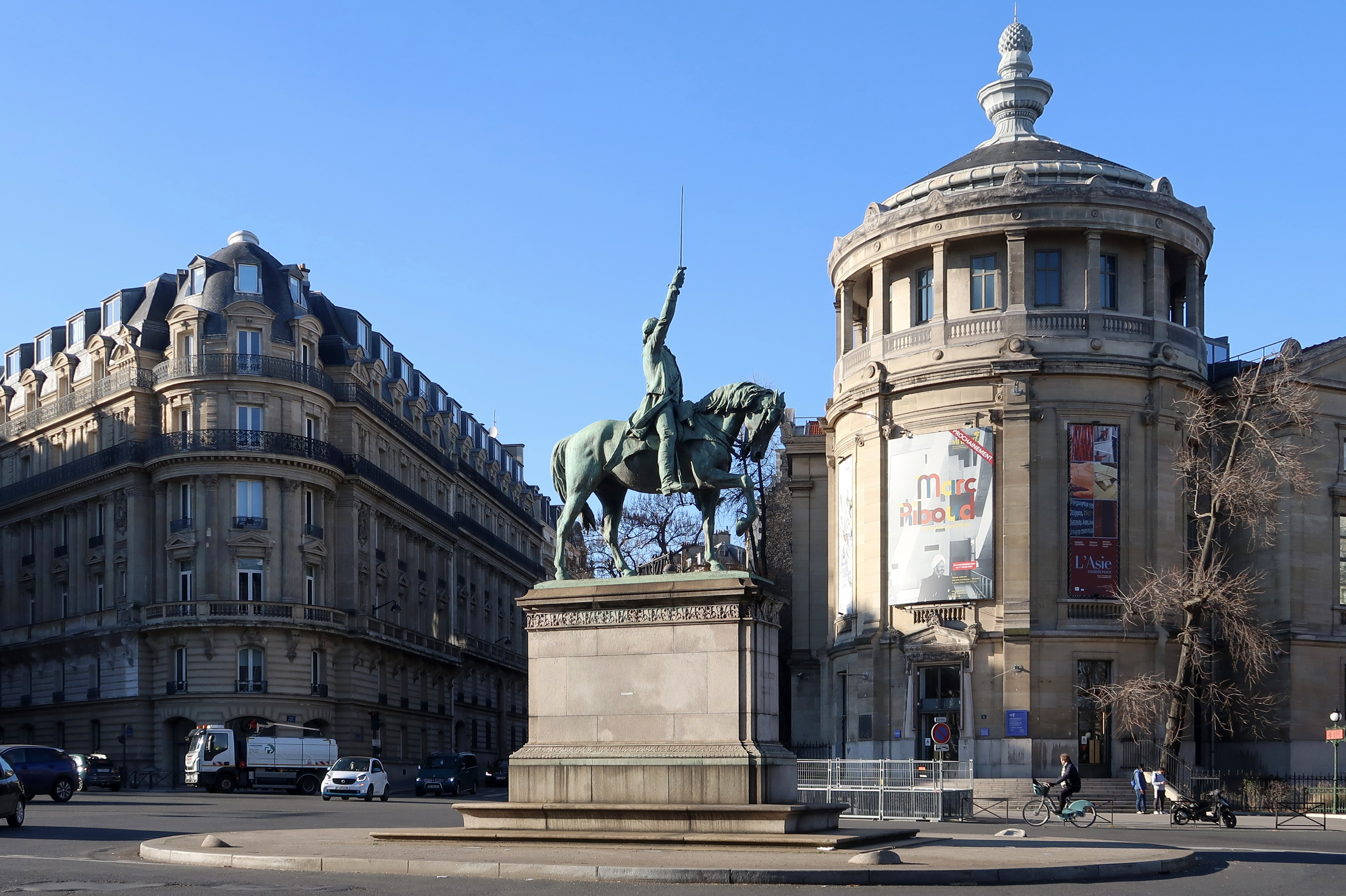
Statue and Guimet Museum in Place d'Iéna

== Replica ==
A replica of the statue was dedicated on June 4, 1904, at the entrance to Washington Park in Chicago.

== See also ==
- 1900 in art
- List of equestrian statues in France
- List of statues of George Washington
- Public sculptures by Daniel Chester French
