= George Robert White =

American philanthropist

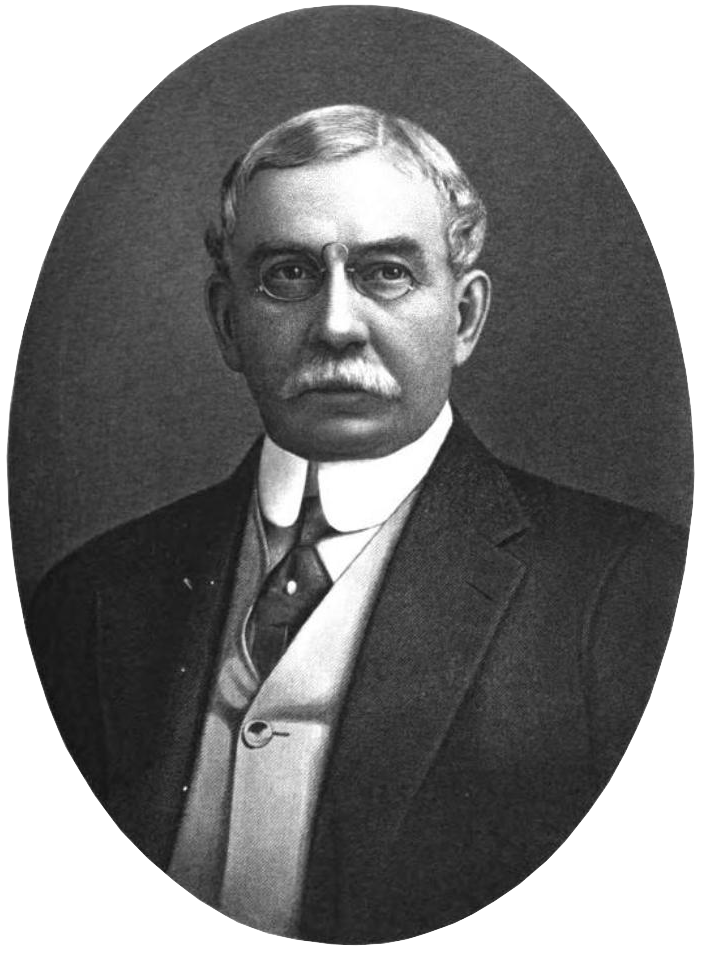
- Born: July 19, 1847; Lynnfield, Massachusetts
- Died: January 27, 1922 (aged 74); Boston, Massachusetts
- Occupation: Businessman
- Known for: Prominent Boston philanthropist, owner of Potter Drug & Chemical Corporation, makers of "Cuticura" soap

Signature
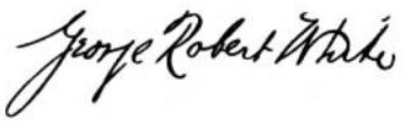

George Robert White (1847–1922) was an American philanthropist.

== Biography ==
George Robert White was born in Lynnfield, Massachusetts, on July 19, 1847. He was a citizen of Boston, Massachusetts, for most of his life. As a boy he began working for the Weeks and Potter Drug Company. Over time White's responsibilities grew and he eventually became the president and owner of the firm. White changed the name of the corporation to that of the Potter Drug and Chemical Company. The company was best known for its antibacterial soap with the brand name Cuticura. Over the course of his life he amassed a fortune. He was active in a number of charitable organizations.

He died at his home in Boston on January 27, 1922.

After his death, he bequeathed a sizable endowment on the City of Boston named The George Robert White Fund.

== George Robert White Fund ==
The George Robert White Fund was established in White's will when he left a trust of $5,000,000 to the City of Boston as a permanent charitable fund. The net income of the fund is to be used only for creating public beauty and utility for the inhabitants of the city, and cannot be used for any of the normally provided services of the municipality. Management of the fund is seated in the mayor of Boston, the president of the City Council, the City Auditor, the president of the Chamber of Commerce, and the president of the Boston Bar Association. Eager to prevent unduly hasty disbursements from the fund, White required a minimum of 3 months deliberation before disbursement. He required the city to make an annual report to the public by the trustees in order to maintain a degree of public accountability. White's desire was to concentrate the fund's spending on substantial projects to beautify the city and while not requiring the following, mentioned in his will projects such as a zoological garden, aquarium, and public gathering places. He suggested allowing the income of the fund to build periodically in order that the projects undertaken could be substantial and not trivial. Money from the George Robert White Fund was used for the commission of the Paul Revere Statue by Cyrus Dallin and 13 memorial plaques all installed at the Paul Revere Mall in Boston in September 1940.

== Charitable boards and associations ==
Mr White was a trustee of several public organizations, including:

- Museum of Fine Arts
- Forest Hills Cemetery

Additionally, he was a substantial benefactor of:

- Museum of Fine Arts
- Massachusetts General Hospital
- Massachusetts College of Pharmacy and Health Sciences

== Commemorations ==
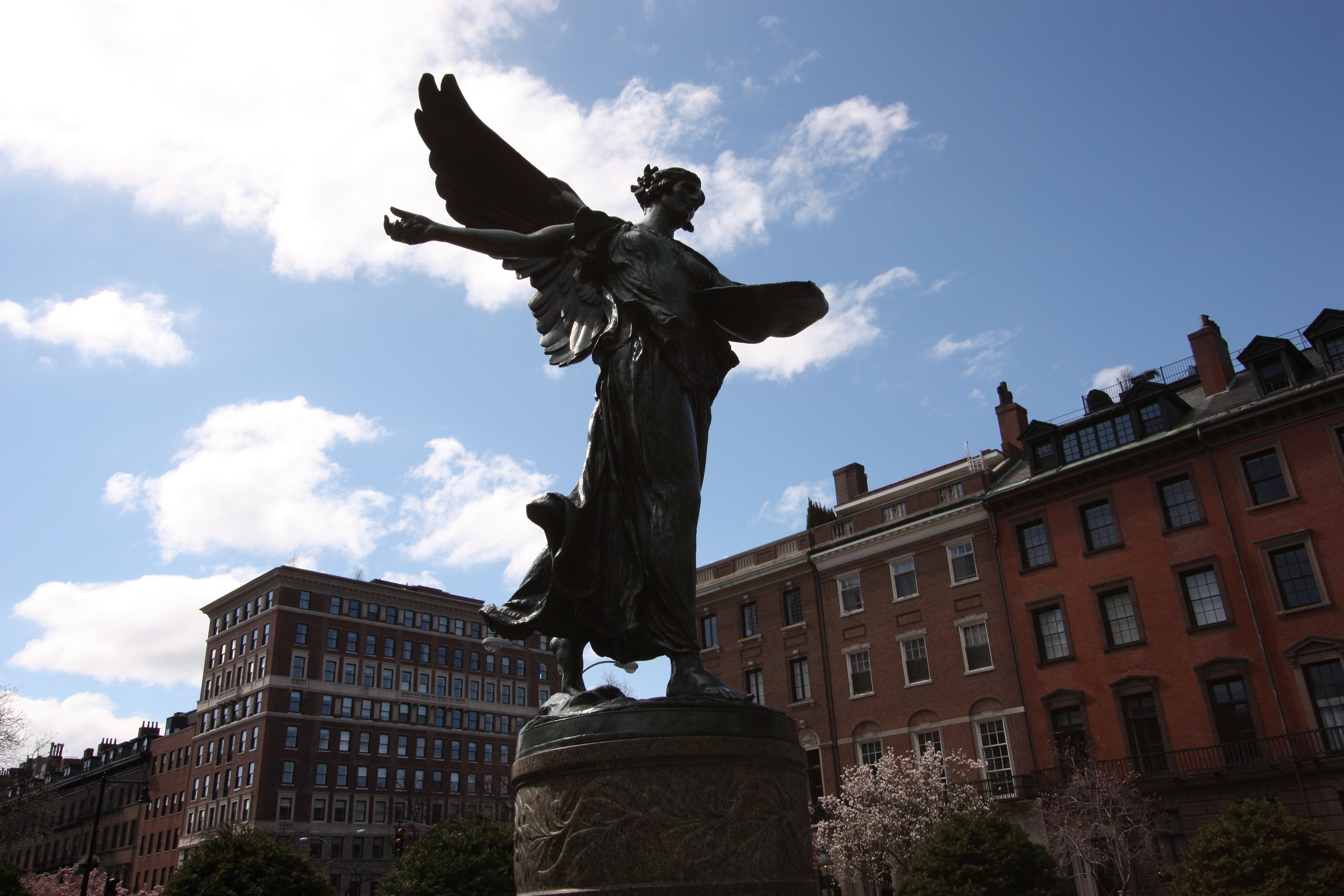
Angel of the Waters

White is remembered by three notable public memorials. In 1905 a memorial was erected at the Forest Hills Cemetery entitled Angel of Peace created by the notable sculptor Daniel Chester French (creator of the Concord Minuteman statue in Concord, MA). In 1924 another monument by French was erected in the Boston Public Garden entitled Angel of the Waters. Additionally, in 2002 the George Robert White Environmental Conservation Center was constructed and grew out of a strong commitment to conservation and environmental protection from both the City of Boston and the Massachusetts Audubon Society.
