= Memory (French) =

Marble sculpture by American artist Daniel Chester French

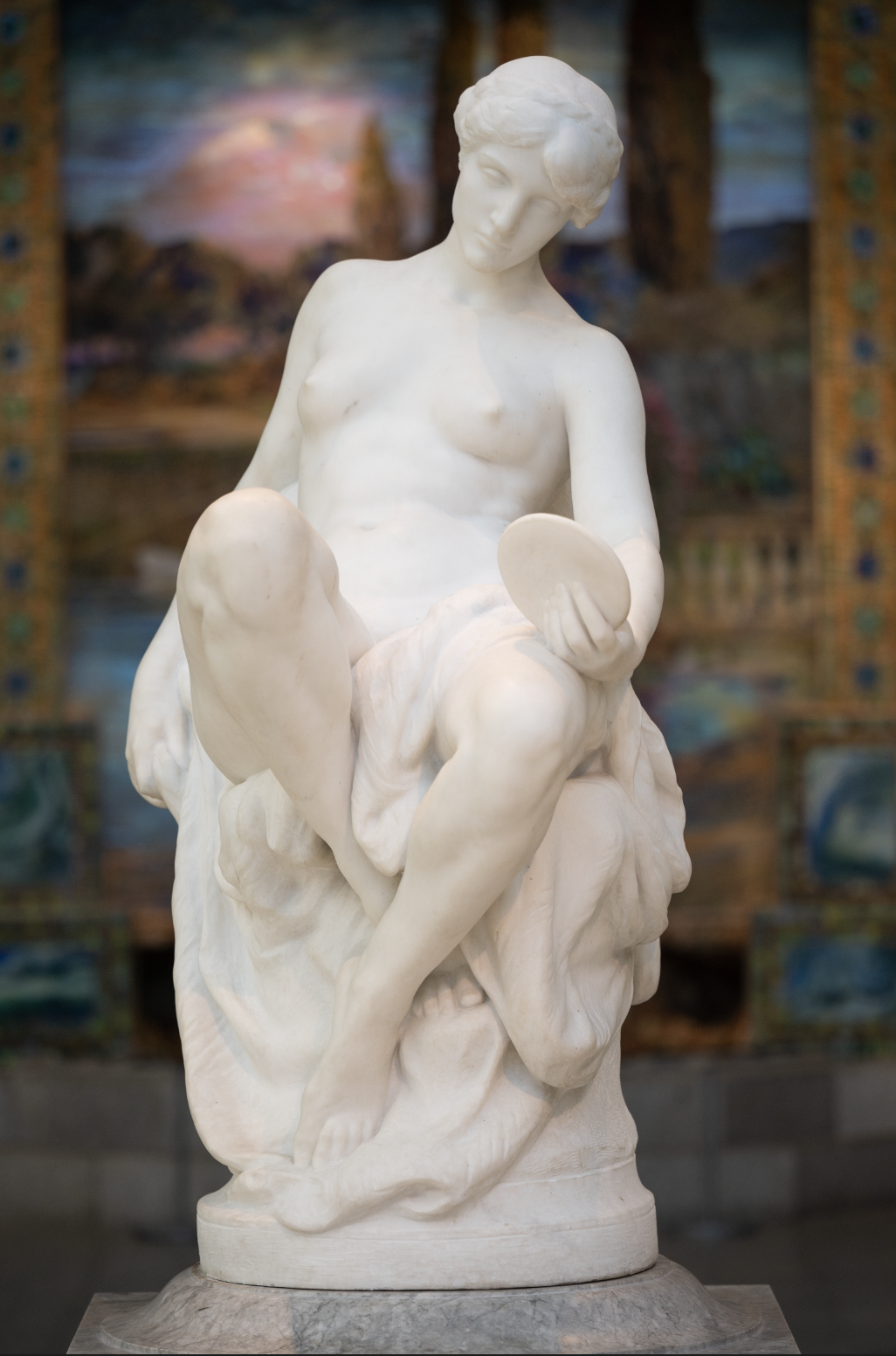
- Memory by Daniel Chester French
- Artist: Daniel Chester French
- Type: Sculpture
- Medium: Marble
- Location: Metropolitan Museum of Art, New York City, New York, United States

Memory is an 1886–1887 (revised 1909) marble sculpture by American artist Daniel Chester French. The finished version measures 57.5 inches (146 cm) x 25 inches (64 cm) x 42.5 inches (108 cm) and is part of the Metropolitan Museum of Art's collection. The statue was carved by the Piccirilli Brothers.

French began working on the concept for the sculpture in 1886 when he produced a small clay sketch that was subsequently cast in bronze. The work was also called Memory. He then returned to the idea about 20 years later and produced the current work. The president of the Metropolitan Museum of Art, Robert W. de Forest, wanted to obtain the piece for the museum, but because French was a trustee of the institution, it would have been unethical for the museum to pay him for it. Eventually a donor, Henry Walters, the museum's vice president, purchased the statue and donated it to the museum. French considered the work to be, "the chief effort of my life."

== See also ==
- Public sculptures by Daniel Chester French
