= Cuticura soap =

- Product type: Soap
- Current owner: George (United States); Karium Ltd. (United Kingdom)
- Country: United States
- Introduced: 1865; 161 years ago
- Markets: United States, United Kingdom
- Previous owners: Potter Drug and Chemical Company (1865-1961); Purex Corporation (1961-1981); Jeffrey Martin Inc. (1981-1986); Dep Corporation (1987-1998); Keyline Brands (1998-2005)
- Website: www.cuticura.com

Cuticura soap is an antibacterial medicated soap respectively manufactured and marketed in the United States by Cuticura Labs Inc. and in the United Kingdom by Karium Ltd. (formerly Godrej UK).

Cuticura soap was originally manufactured in Boston, Massachusetts by Potter Drug and Chemical Company. Noted Boston philanthropist George Robert White (1847-1922) was once the president and owner of Potter Drug and Chemical Company. Cuticura soap has been in use, and is relatively unchanged, since 1865.

== Reviews ==
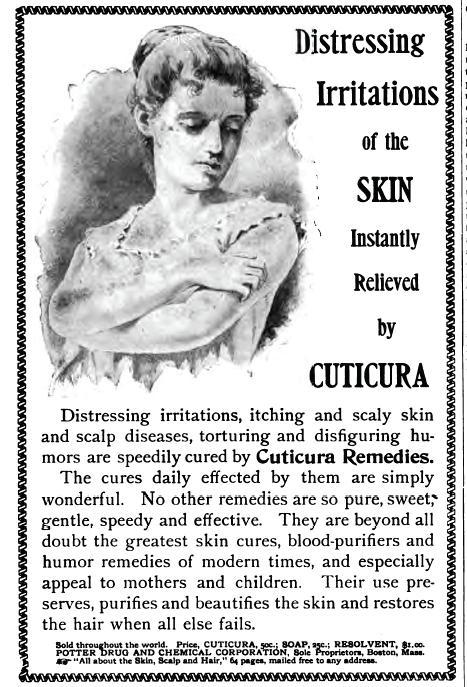
1894 advertisement for Cuticura Soap from Good Housekeeping magazine

In 1908, the British Medical Journal investigated the advertising of nostrums for the treatment of skin diseases. As reported by the American Medical Association it was implied that Cuticura soap could be effective in the treatment of syphilis when prepared as an internal remedy known as Cuticura Resolvent. The medical community considered the proposed remedy to contain insufficient potassium iodide to be effective in the treatment of the disease.

In 1914, Good Housekeeping ran an analysis of a large number of household products including Cuticura soap. They concluded that Cuticura was,

"A good grade of soap containing a small quantity of prussian blue and probably a little phenol. Prussian blue has been recommended for skin diseases. Excessive claims made for Cuticura as to the prevention and treatment of skin eruptions, are not warranted by its composition."
