= George Robert White Memorial =

Sculpture in Boston, Massachusetts, U.S.

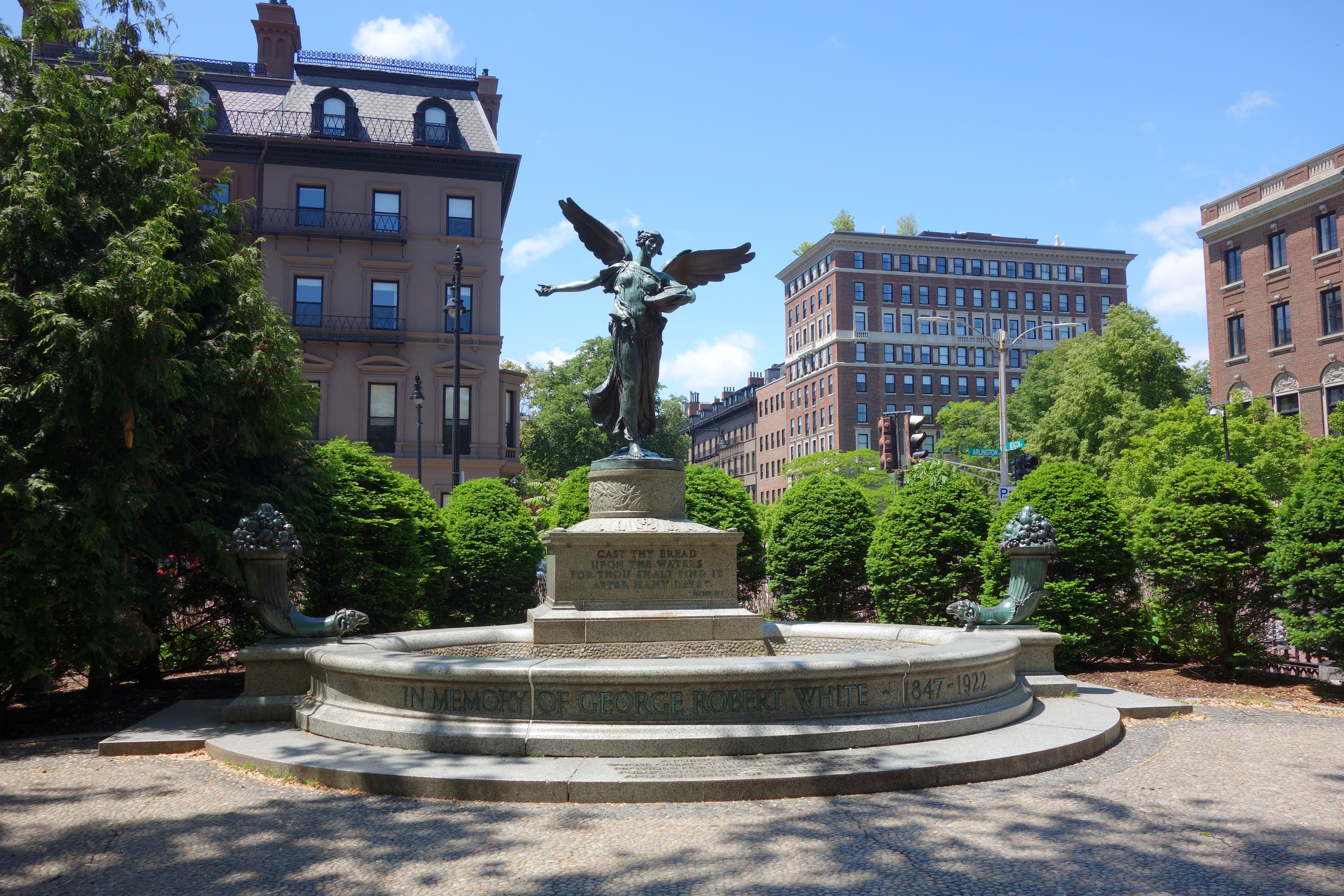
- The memorial in 2014
- Location: Boston, Massachusetts, U.S.; 42°21′19.3″N 71°4′19.8″W

The George Robert White Memorial, also known as The Spirit of Giving, is an outdoor memorial commemorating George Robert White by sculptor Daniel Chester French and architect Henry Bacon, installed in Boston's Public Garden, in the U.S. state of Massachusetts. The 1924 bronze sculpture depicts an allegorical winged female on a Rockport granite base, above an elliptical-shaped granite and pebble fountain. It was surveyed as part of the Smithsonian Institution's "Save Outdoor Sculpture!" program in 1993. The fountain was disabled in the 1980s and remained so until 2016 when it was repaired and restored by the Friends of the Public Garden at a cost of $700,000.

== See also ==
- Public sculptures by Daniel Chester French
