= Daniel Chester French =

American sculptor (1850–1931)

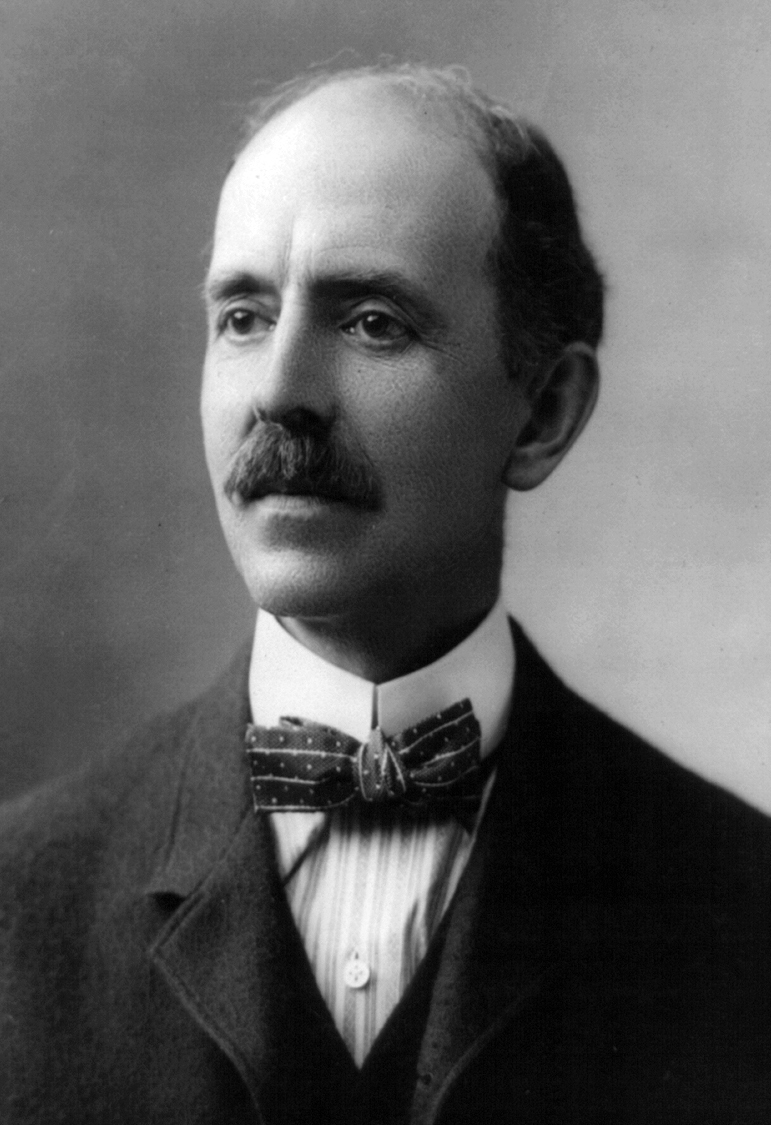
- French in 1902
- Born: April 20, 1850; Exeter, New Hampshire, U.S.
- Died: October 7, 1931 (aged 81); Stockbridge, Massachusetts, U.S.
- Education: Massachusetts Institute of Technology (no degree)
- Known for: Sculpture
- Notable work: Statue of Abraham Lincoln (Lincoln Memorial)
- Movement: American Renaissance
- Patrons: Hiram Powers, Thomas Ball

Daniel Chester French (April 20, 1850 – October 7, 1931) was an American sculptor in the late 19th and early 20th centuries. His works include The Minute Man, an 1874 statue in Concord, Massachusetts, and his 1920 monumental statue of Abraham Lincoln at the Lincoln Memorial in Washington, D.C.

== Early life and education ==
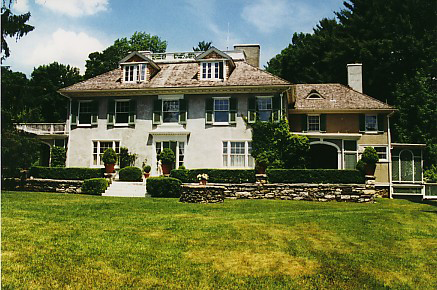
French's summer home, studio Chesterwood in Stockbridge, Massachusetts

French was born on April 20, 1850, in Exeter, New Hampshire, the son of Anne Richardson (1811–1856), daughter of William Merchant Richardson (1774–1838), chief justice of New Hampshire, and of Henry Flagg French (1813–1885), a lawyer, judge, Assistant U.S. Treasury Secretary, and author of a book that described the French drain. His siblings were Henriette Van Mater French Hollis (1839–1911), Sarah Flagg French Bartlett (1846–1883), and William M.R. French (1843–1914). He was the uncle of Senator Henry F. Hollis.

In 1867, French moved with his family to Concord, Massachusetts, where he was a neighbor and friend of Ralph Waldo Emerson, and the Alcott family. His decision to pursue sculpting was influenced by Louisa May Alcott's sister Abigail May Alcott.

French's early education included training in anatomy with William Rimmer and in drawing with William Morris Hunt. French spent a year studying at the Massachusetts Institute of Technology, and also several years in Florence, Italy, studying in the studio of Thomas Ball.

== Career ==
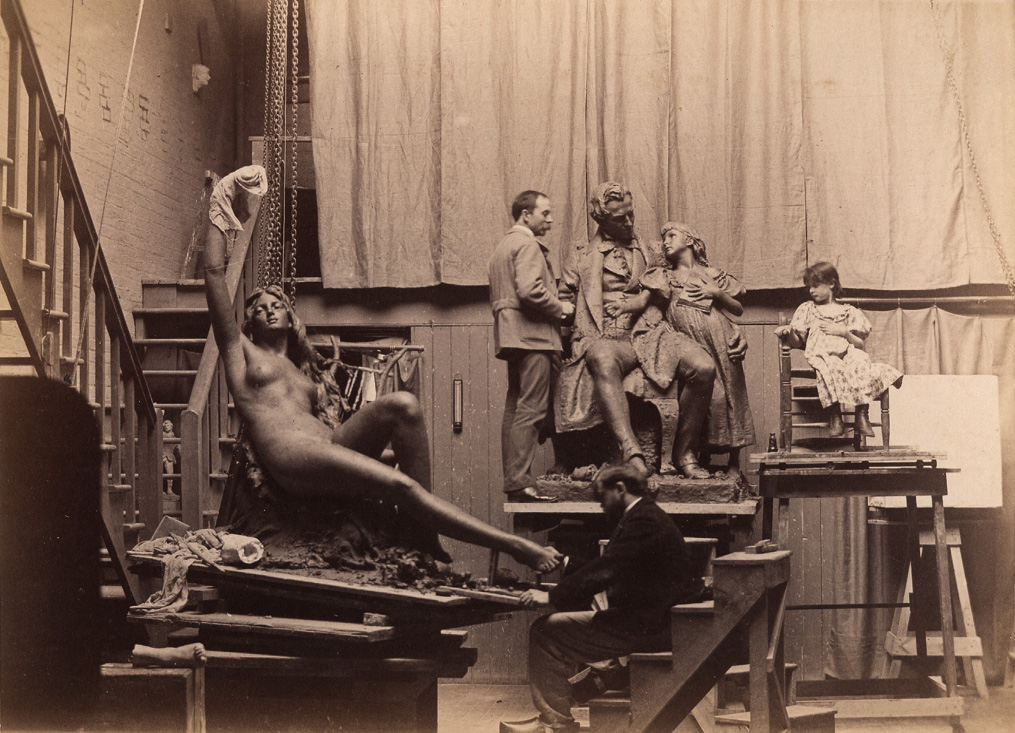
French in his studio with the model for Thomas Hopkins Gallaudet and Alice Cogswell, c. 1889

French first earned acclaim for The Minute Man, commissioned by the town of Concord, Massachusetts, which was unveiled April 19, 1875, on the centenary of the Battles of Lexington and Concord, the first armed conflict of the American Revolutionary War.

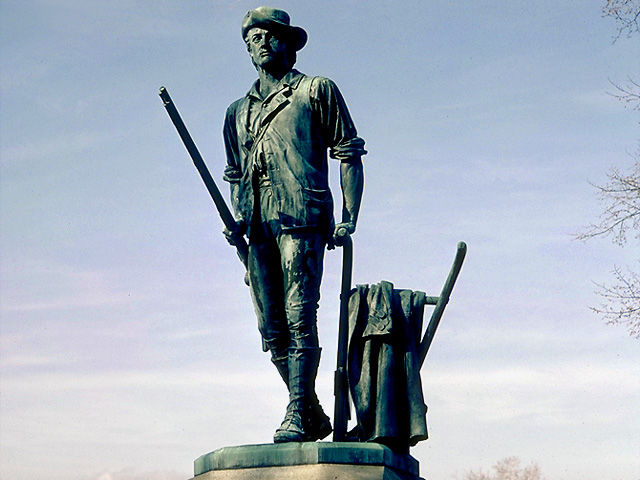
The Minute Man (1874) in Concord, Massachusetts

French established his own studio, first in Washington, D.C., which he later moved to Boston and then to New York City. In 1893, French's reputation grew with his Statue of the Republic for the World's Columbian Exposition in Chicago. Other works by French include the First Division Monument and the Butt-Millet Memorial Fountain, both in Washington, D.C., John Harvard on the campus of Harvard University in Cambridge, Massachusetts, bronze doors for the Boston Central Library in Boston, and Four Continents at the U.S. Custom House, New York, later renamed the Alexander Hamilton US Custom House. In addition to the Lincoln Memorial, French collaborated with architect Henry Bacon on memorials around the country, including the Dupont Circle fountain in Washington, D.C.

In 1893, French was a founding member of the National Sculpture Society, and he was appointed a Fellow of the American Academy of Arts and Sciences in 1913. During this time, he served as an instructor at the Art Students League of New York, teaching sculpture there in 1890 and 1898. French also became a member of the National Academy of Design (1901), the American Academy of Arts and Letters (which awarded him the Gold Medal for Sculpture in 1917), the Architectural League, and the Accademia di San Luca, of Rome. He was a trustee of the Metropolitan Museum of Art in New York City, and a co-founder of the American Academy in Rome. He was a Chevalier of the French Legion of Honor and was awarded a medal of honor from the Paris Exposition of 1900; he also was granted honorary degrees from Dartmouth, Yale, Harvard, and Columbia universities. He was a founding member of the U.S. Commission of Fine Arts, serving from 1910 to 1915, including as chairman from 1912 to 1915.

In 1917, French and a colleague, Henry Augustus Lukeman, designed the Pulitzer Prize gold medal presented to laureates. French designed the side of the prize with Benjamin Franklin on it, while Lukeman created the iconic design of the printing press and the wording on the award: "For disinterested and meritorious public service rendered by an American newspaper during the year….". In collaboration with Edward Clark Potter he modeled the George Washington statue, commissioned by a group that called itself "The Association of American Women for the Erection of a Statue of Washington in Paris" and unveiled in the Place d'Iena in Paris, France, in 1900; the General Grant statue in Fairmount Park, Philadelphia, commissioned by the Association for Public Art (formerly the Fairmount Park Art Association); and the equestrian statue of Joseph Hooker in Boston.

French was one of many sculptors who frequently employed Audrey Munson as a model; another frequent sitter was Hettie Anderson. Together with Walter Leighton Clark and others, he was also one of the founders of the Berkshire Playhouse, which later became the Berkshire Theatre Festival. French's daughter, Margaret, also occasionally modeled for him, including for some of his rare portrait paintings, and became famous in her own right as a sculptor under the name Margaret French Cresson. In 1917, Harvard's citation in conferring an honorary Master of Arts referred to his statue of Emerson when it called him "a sculptor, whose skillful hand, unlike that of the friend whom he portrayed, has not been stopped but spared to adorn our land by the creation of his art". French also taught; among his pupils was the sculptor Edith Howland.

== Death ==
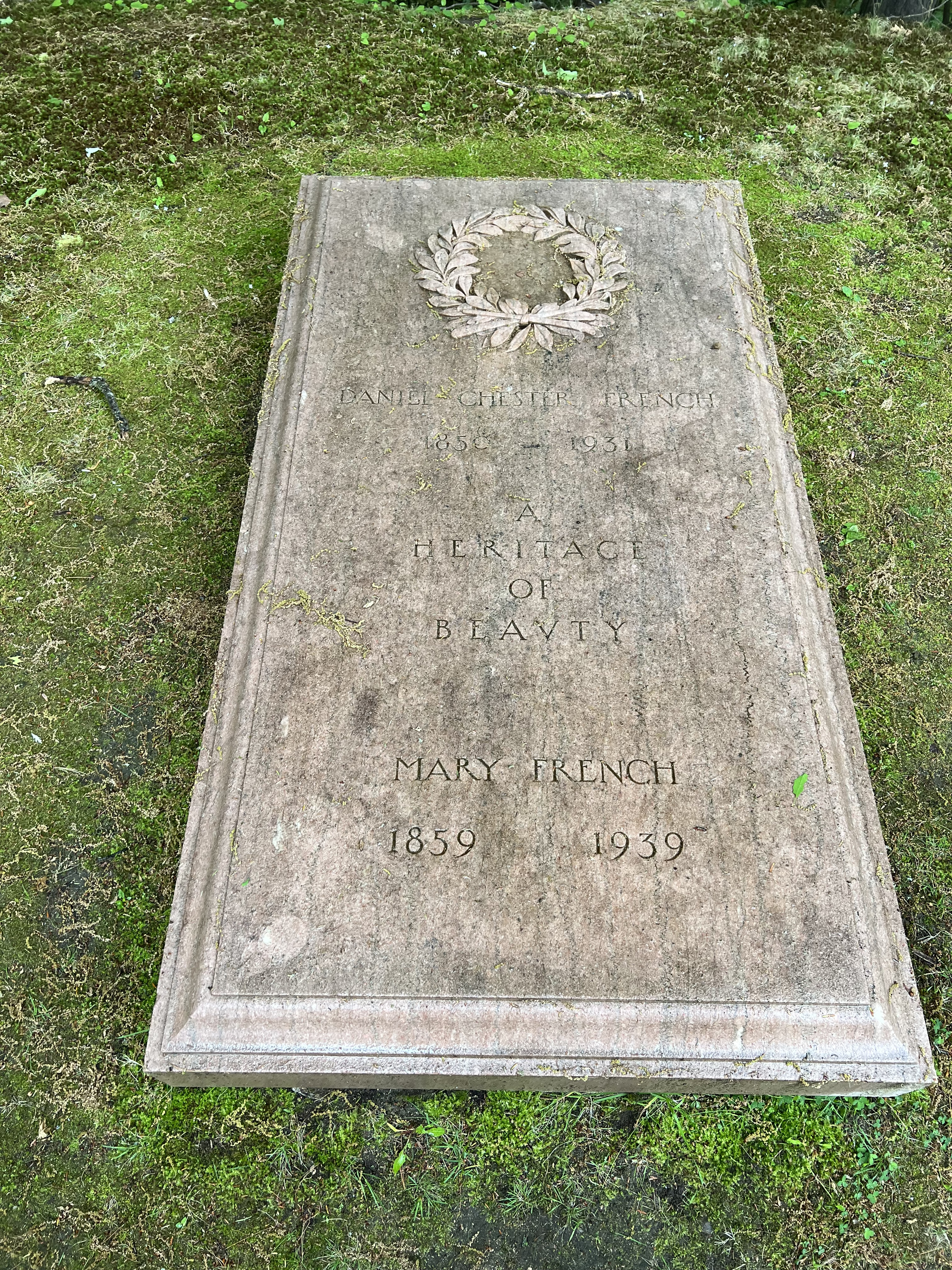
Grave of Daniel Chester French in Sleepy Hollow Cemetery

French died in Stockbridge, Massachusetts, in 1931 at age 81, and was interred in Sleepy Hollow Cemetery, Concord.

== Legacy ==
- Chesterwood, French's summer home and studio – designed by his architect friend and frequent collaborator Henry Bacon – is now a historic site owned and operated by the National Trust for Historic Preservation.
- In 1940, French was selected as one of five artists to be honored in the 35-stamp "Famous Americans" series.
- The World War II Liberty Ship SS Daniel Chester French was named in his honor.
- Daniel Chester French: American Sculptor (2022) is a documentary film by Eduardo Montes-Bradley produced in association with Chesterwood and the National Trust for Historic Preservation.
- Chester French was an American indie band named for the artist.

== Works ==
=== Public monuments ===
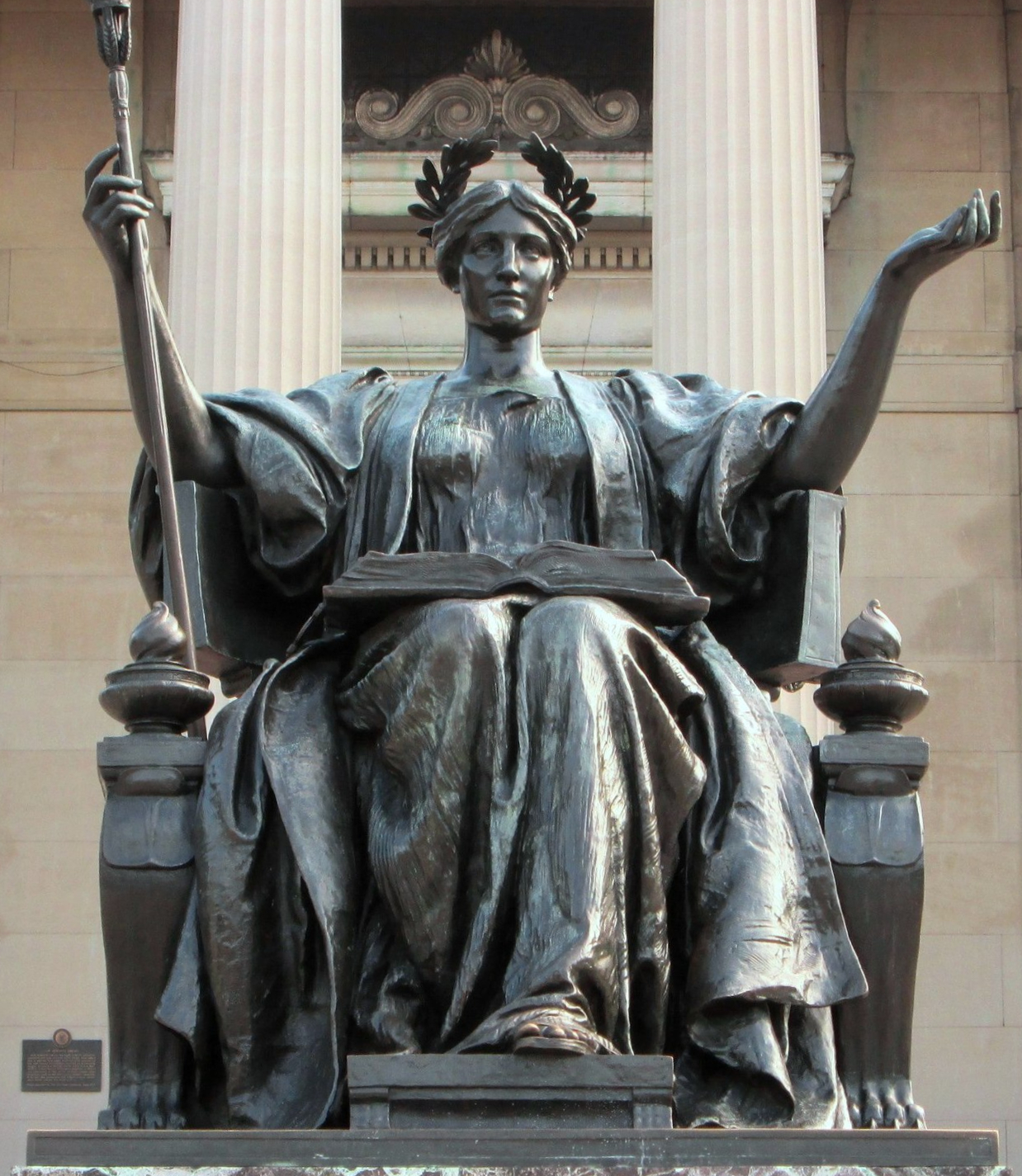
Alma Mater (1903) at Columbia University in Manhattan, New York City

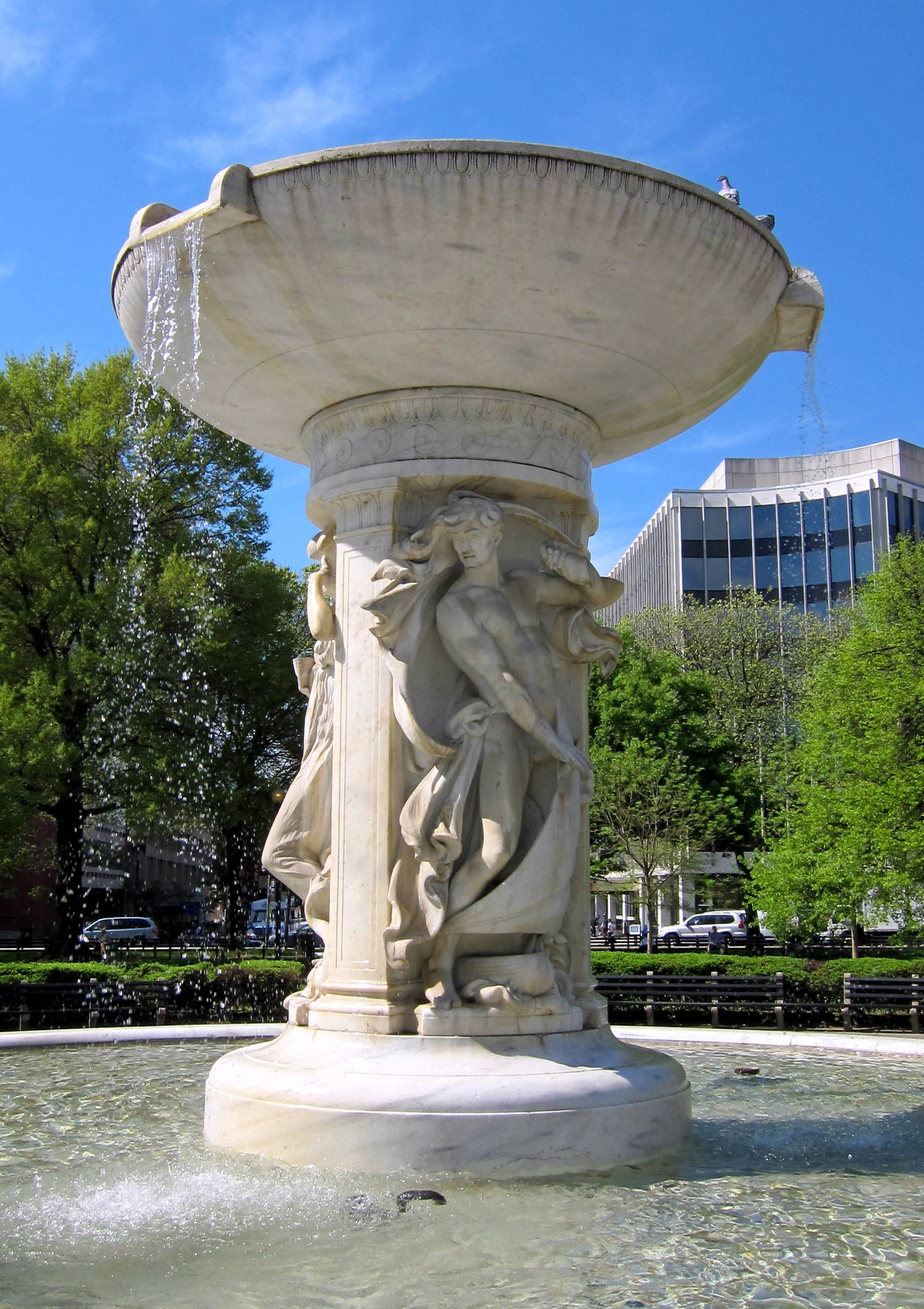
Dupont Circle Fountain (1921), Dupont Circle, Washington, D.C.

- The Minute Man at the Old North Bridge in Concord, Massachusetts, (1874)
- Bust of Major General William Francis Bartlett at Memorial Hall at Harvard University in Cambridge, Massachusetts (1881)
- Statue of John Harvard at Harvard Yard at Harvard University (1884)
- Lewis Cass, National Statuary Hall, Washington, D.C. (1889)
- Thomas Hopkins Gallaudet and Alice Cogswell (1889), Gallaudet University, Washington, D.C.
- Thomas Starr King monument San Francisco, California (1891)
- Statue of The Republic, the colossal centerpiece of the World's Columbian Exposition, Chicago, 1893. His 24-foot gilt-bronze reduced version made in 1918 survives in Chicago.
- John Boyle O'Reilly Memorial, intersection of Boylston Street and the Fenway in Boston (1897)
- Rufus Choate memorial, Old Suffolk County Court House, in Boston, (1898)
- Richard Morris Hunt Memorial, on the perimeter wall of Central Park, at Fifth Avenue at 70th Street, opposite the Frick Collection in New York City (1900)
- Commodore George H. Perkins Monument at the New Hampshire State House, Concord, New Hampshire (1902)
- Alma Mater (1903), on the campus of Columbia University in New York City
- Statue of Wendell Phillips, Public Garden in Boston
- The Four Continents – Asia, America, Europe, and Africa, a group of four statues outside the National Museum of the American Indian at the Alexander Hamilton U.S. Custom House, Manhattan, NYC (1907)
- George Robert White Memorial, Public Garden in Boston
- Statue of Samuel Spencer, first president of Southern Railway, located in front of Goode Building (Norfolk Southern offices) on Peachtree Street in Midtown Atlanta, Georgia (1910)
- August Meyer Memorial, 10th and The Paseo, Kansas City, Missouri (1909)
- James Oglethorpe Monument, Chippewa Square, Savannah, Georgia (1910)
- Standing Lincoln at the Nebraska State Capitol, Lincoln, Nebraska (1912)
- Brooklyn and Manhattan, seated figures from the Manhattan Bridge, Brooklyn Museum in Brooklyn, New York City (1915)
- Minuteman, Henry Bacon designer, Jno. Williams, Inc. (NY) founder, Danville, Illinois. (1915)
- The Spirit of Life, memorial to Spencer Trask, in Saratoga Springs, New York, at Congress Park (1915)
- Abraham Lincoln in the Lincoln Memorial (1914–22), executed by the Piccirilli Brothers.
- The Weaver, outside the Peace Dale Library in South Kingstown, Rhode Island (1919)
- Marquis de Lafayette Memorial, on the perimeter of Prospect Park (Brooklyn), at 9th Street and Prospect Park West in Brooklyn, New York City (1917)
- Samuel Francis du Pont Memorial Fountain, Dupont Circle, Washington D.C. (1921)
- Alfred Tredway White Memorial, Brooklyn Botanic Garden, Henry Bacon architect (1921)
- Russell Alger Memorial Fountain, Grand Circus Park, Detroit, Michigan (1921)
- Marquis de Lafayette Statue, Lafayette College campus, Easton, Pennsylvania (1921)
- Gale Park War Memorial & Park, Exeter, New Hampshire (1922)
- Bust of Washington Irving and reliefs of Boabdil and Rip Van Winkle for the Washington Irving Memorial, Irvington, New York (1927)
- Beneficence, Ball State University in Muncie, Indiana (1930)
- William Henry Seward Memorial in Florida, New York (1930)
- Death and the Wounded Soldier aka Death and Youth, The Chapel of Saint Peter and Saint Paul, St. Paul's School, Concord, New Hampshire
- James Woods, "Uncle Jimmy" Green, University of Kansas, Lawrence, Kansas (1924)
- Gen. William Franklin Draper, Draper Memorial Park, Milford, Massachusetts (1912)

=== Architectural sculpture ===
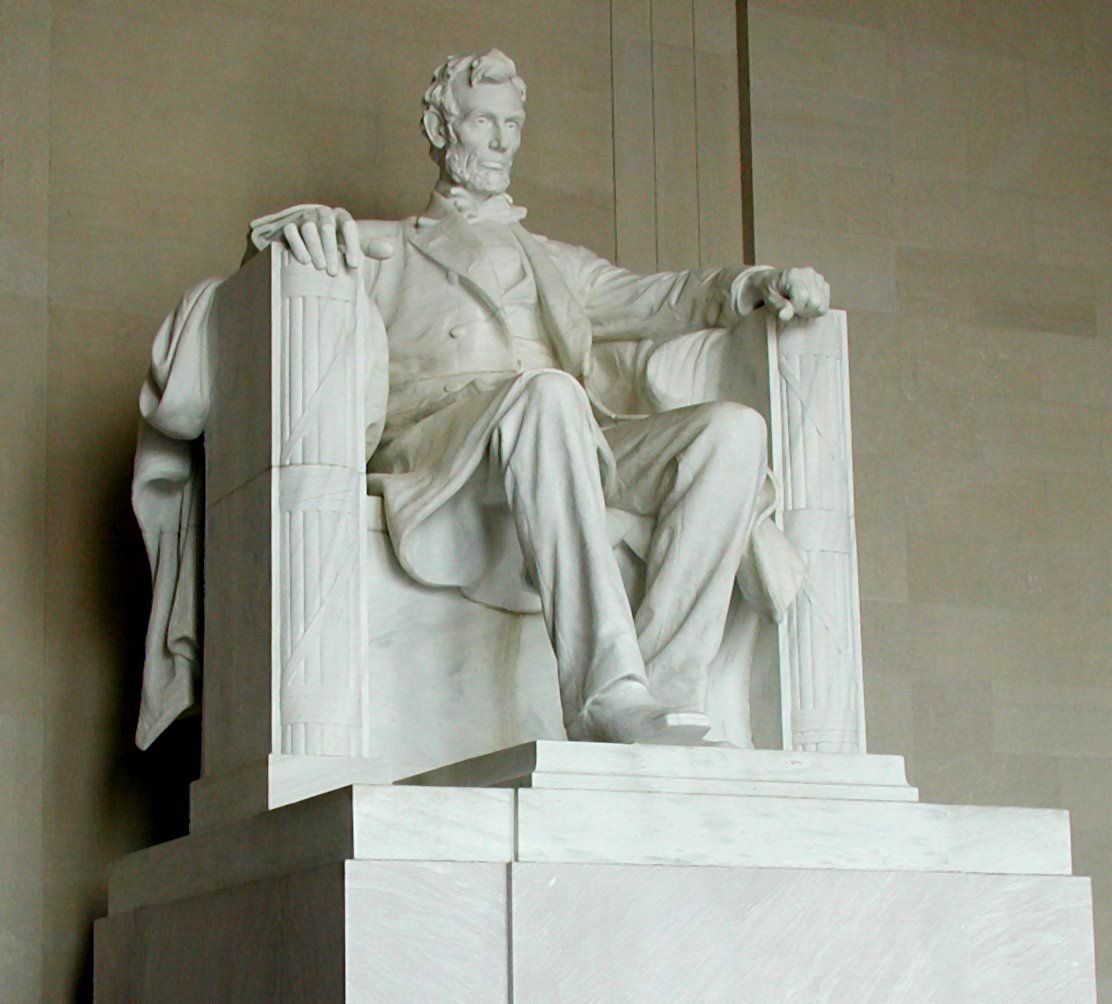
Abraham Lincoln (1920) at the Lincoln Memorial in Washington, D.C.

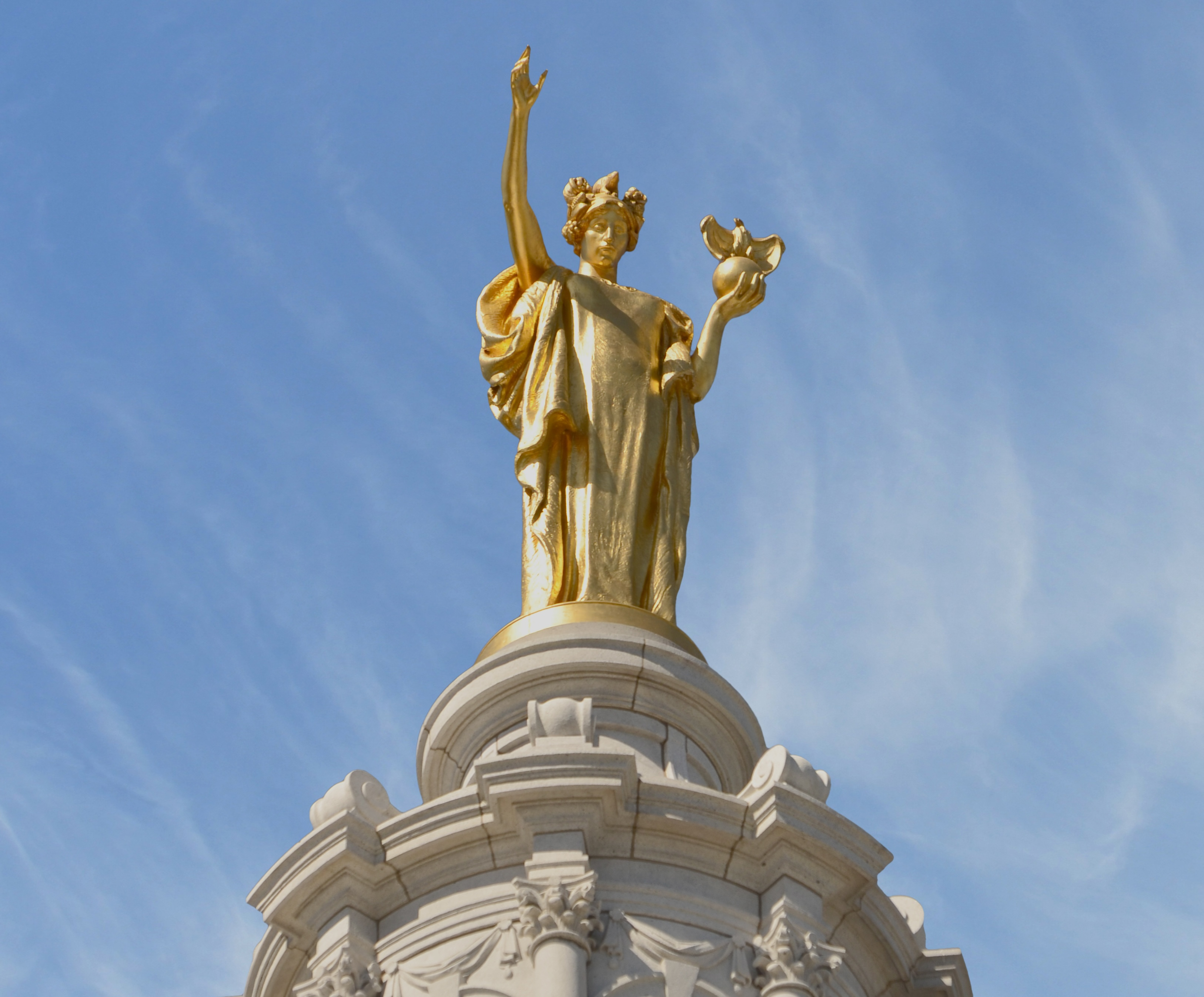
Gilded bronze statue Wisconsin atop Wisconsin State Capitol

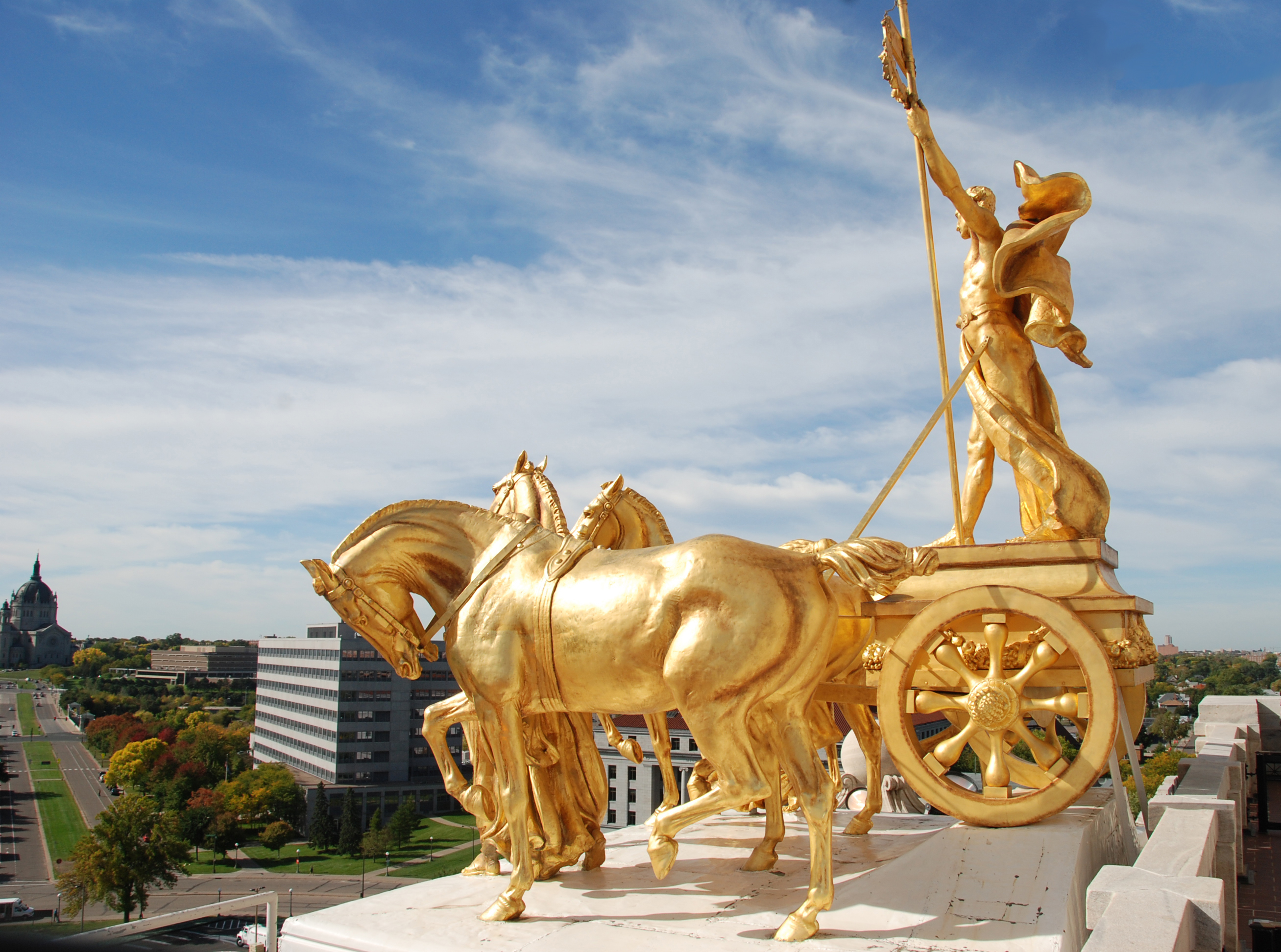
Progress of the State at the Minnesota State Capitol in St. Paul

- Peace and Vigilance (alternatively America at War and Peace) US Customhouse and Post Office, St. Louis, Missouri, Alfred B. Mullett architect (1876–1882)
- Pediment, New Hampshire Historic Society Building, Concord, New Hampshire, Guy Lowell, architect (1909–1911)
- Bronze doors, Boston Public Library, Boston, Massachusetts, McKim, Mead & White architects, (1884–1904)
- Justice, Appellate Division Courthouse of New York State, Manhattan, New York, James Brown Lord architect (1900)
- Four Continents, Alexander Hamilton U.S. Custom House, Manhattan, New York, Cass Gilbert architect, (1904, with Adolph A. Weinman)
- Progress of the State, quadriga, Six statues on entablature, Minnesota State Capitol, St. Paul, Minnesota, Cass Gilbert architect (1907)
- Jurisprudence and Commerce, Federal Building, Cleveland, Ohio, Arnold Brunner architect (1910)
- John Hampden, and Edward I, two attic figures, Cuyahoga County Courthouse, Cleveland, Ohio, Lehman & Schmidt architects (1908, 1911)
- Attic Figures, pediment, Brooklyn Museum, NYC, McKim, Mead & White architects (1912)
- Wisconsin, figure surmounting the dome, Wisconsin State Capitol, Madison, Wisconsin, George B. Post architect (1914)
- Abraham Lincoln (1920), Lincoln Memorial, Washington, D.C., Henry Bacon architect (1914–1922)
- Peace, sculpture for the Admiral George Dewey Triumphal Arch and Colonnade that was built in Madison Square in Manhattan, New York, in 1900.
- DeWitt Clinton, one of three statues prepared in 1903 for the New York Chamber of Commerce and Industry Building at 65 Liberty Street, Manhattan, New York. The statues were removed in 1926.
- Greek Epic; Lyric Poetry, and Religion. Sculptures for the 1908 Brooklyn Institute of Arts and Sciences building on Eastern Parkway in Brooklyn, New York.
- Power and Wisdom. Sculpture for the 1919 First World War Memorial. Since destroyed.

=== Cemetery monuments ===
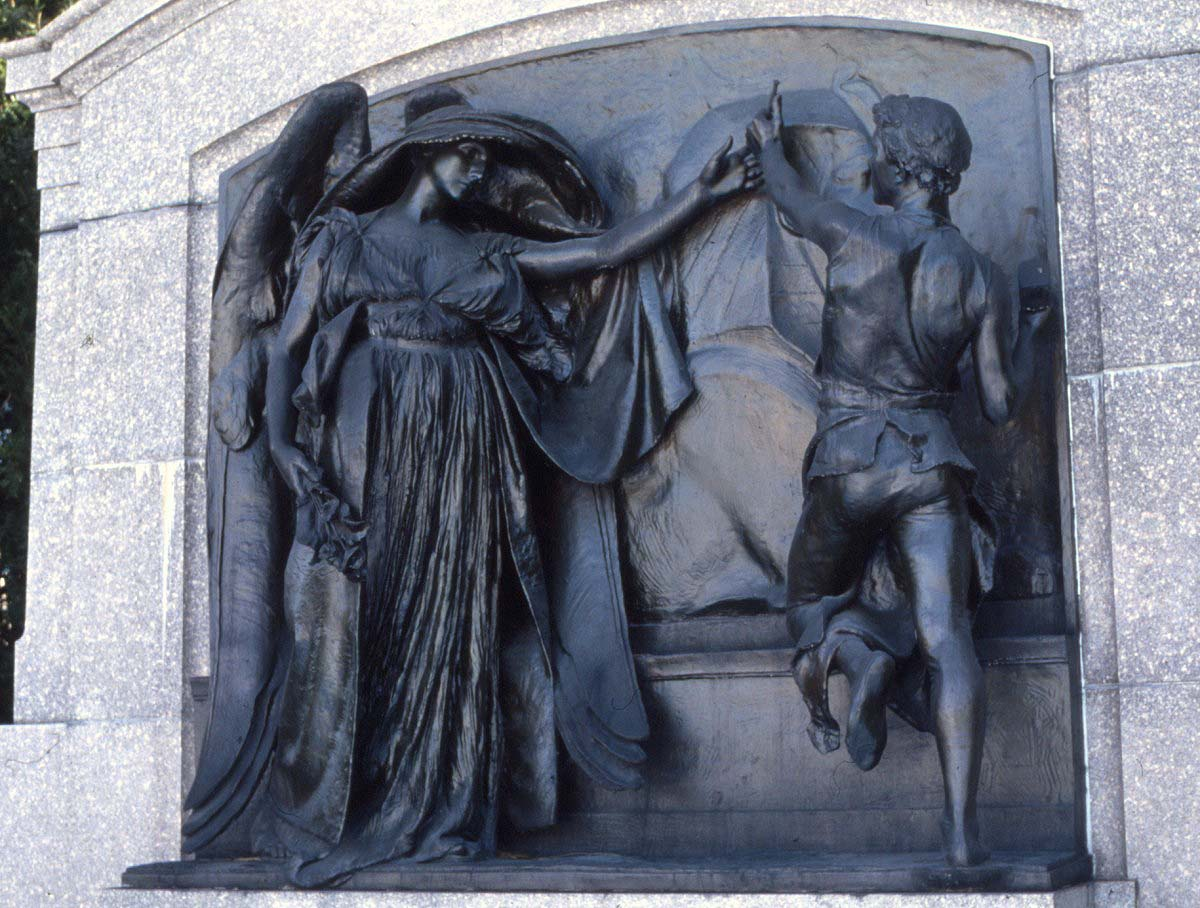
Death and the Sculptor (1893) in Boston

- Death and the Sculptor, a memorial for the grave of the sculptor Martin Milmore in the Forest Hills cemetery, Boston; this received a medal of honor at Paris, in 1900. (1893)
- Clark Memorial, Forest Hills Cemetery, Jamaica Plain, Massachusetts, (1894)
- Chapman Memorial, Forest Home Cemetery, Milwaukee, Wisconsin, (1897)
- Ruth Anne Dodge Memorial, Council Bluffs, Iowa. Often referred to as the "Black Angel". (1918)
- Memory, the Marshall Field Memorial, Graceland Cemetery, Chicago, Henry Bacon, architect (1906)
- Slocum Memorial, Forest Hills Cemetery in Jamaica Plain, Massachusetts
- Melvin Memorial, Sleepy Hollow Cemetery, Concord, Massachusetts, Henry Bacon, architect (1906–1908)

=== Selected museum pieces ===
- The Angel of Death and the Sculptor, Metropolitan Museum of Art in New York City
- Mourning Victory, Metropolitan Museum of Art in New York City
- And the Sons of God saw the Daughters of Men That They Were Fair…, For French, this was an unusually erotic sculpture depicting the verse from Genesis whereby a fallen angel seduces a mortal woman thus producing the mythical Nephilim, Corcoran Gallery of Art; Washington, D.C., signed and dated 1923.

=== Miscellaneous pieces and works about French ===
- Daniel Chester French: American Sculptor: 2022 documentary film by Eduardo Montes-Bradley
- The Chicago Incendiary: edition of a small bisque statuette depicting the cow alleged to have started the Great Chicago Fire of 1871
- Bust of John Brewster, who endowed Brewster Academy in 1887.

== Gallery ==
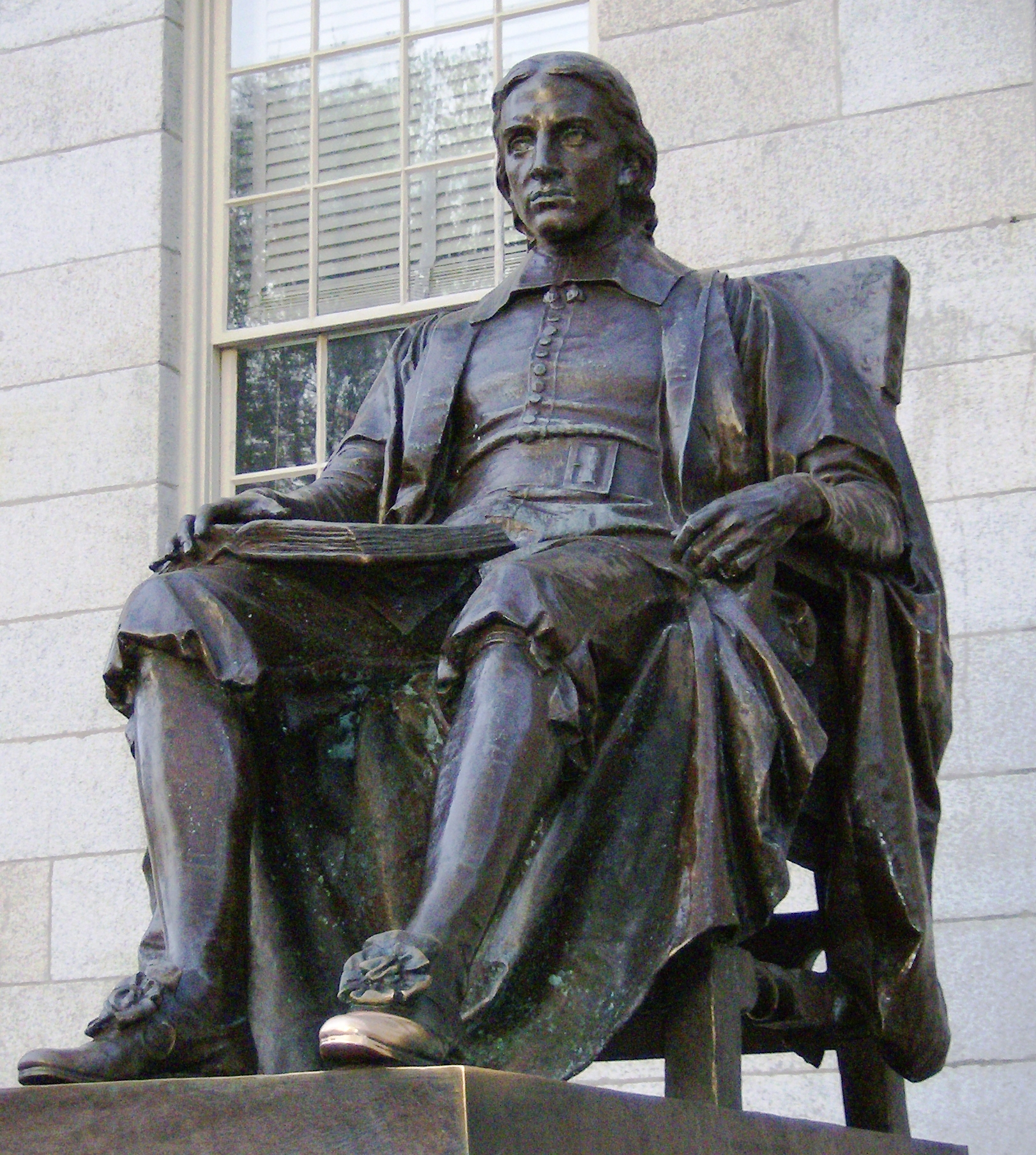
John Harvard (1884), Harvard Yard at Harvard University, Cambridge, Massachusetts

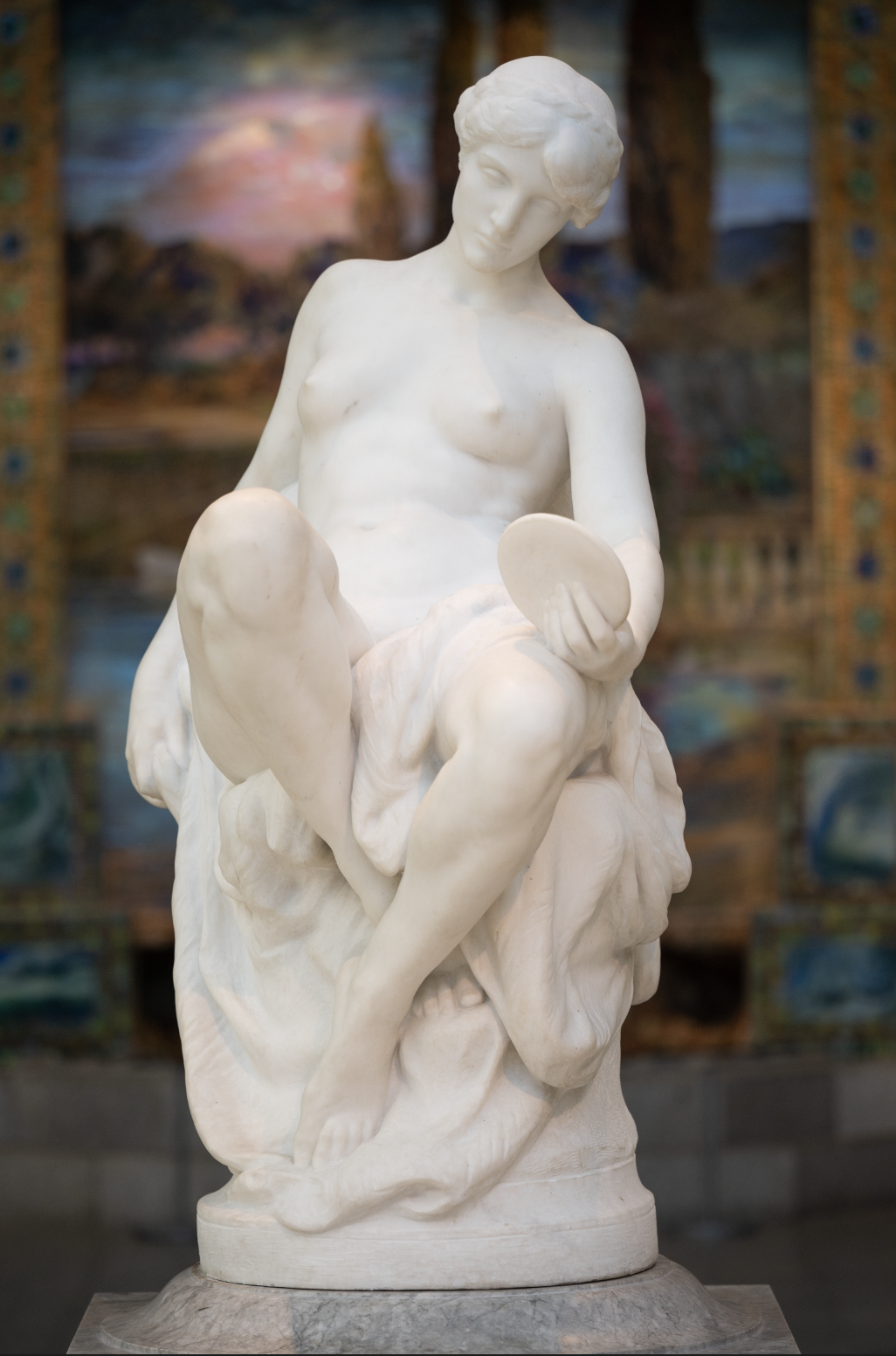
Memory, Metropolitan Museum of Art

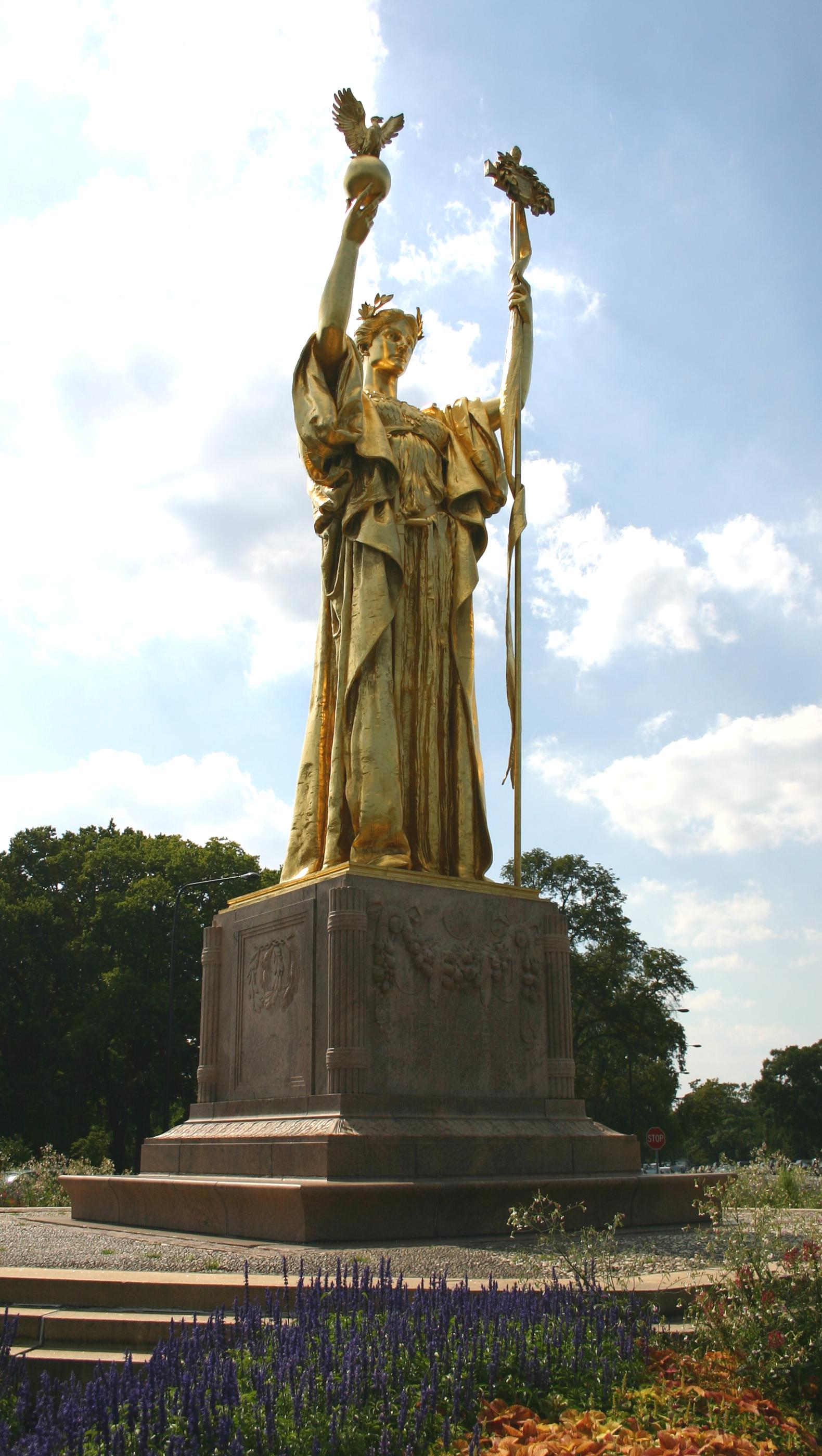
Statue of The Republic, (1893, reduced vers. 1918), Chicago

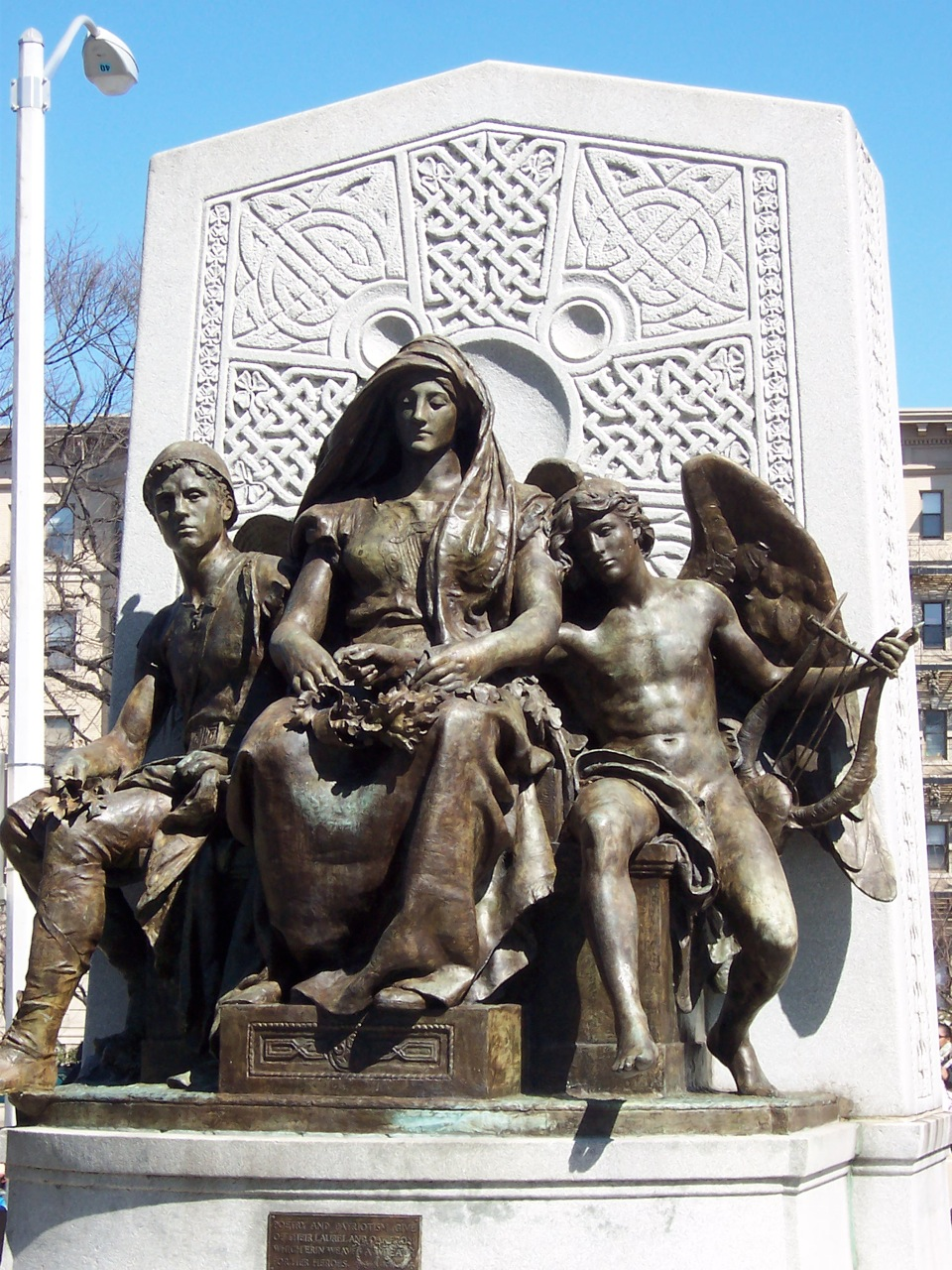
John Boyle O'Reilly Memorial (1897), Boston, Massachusetts

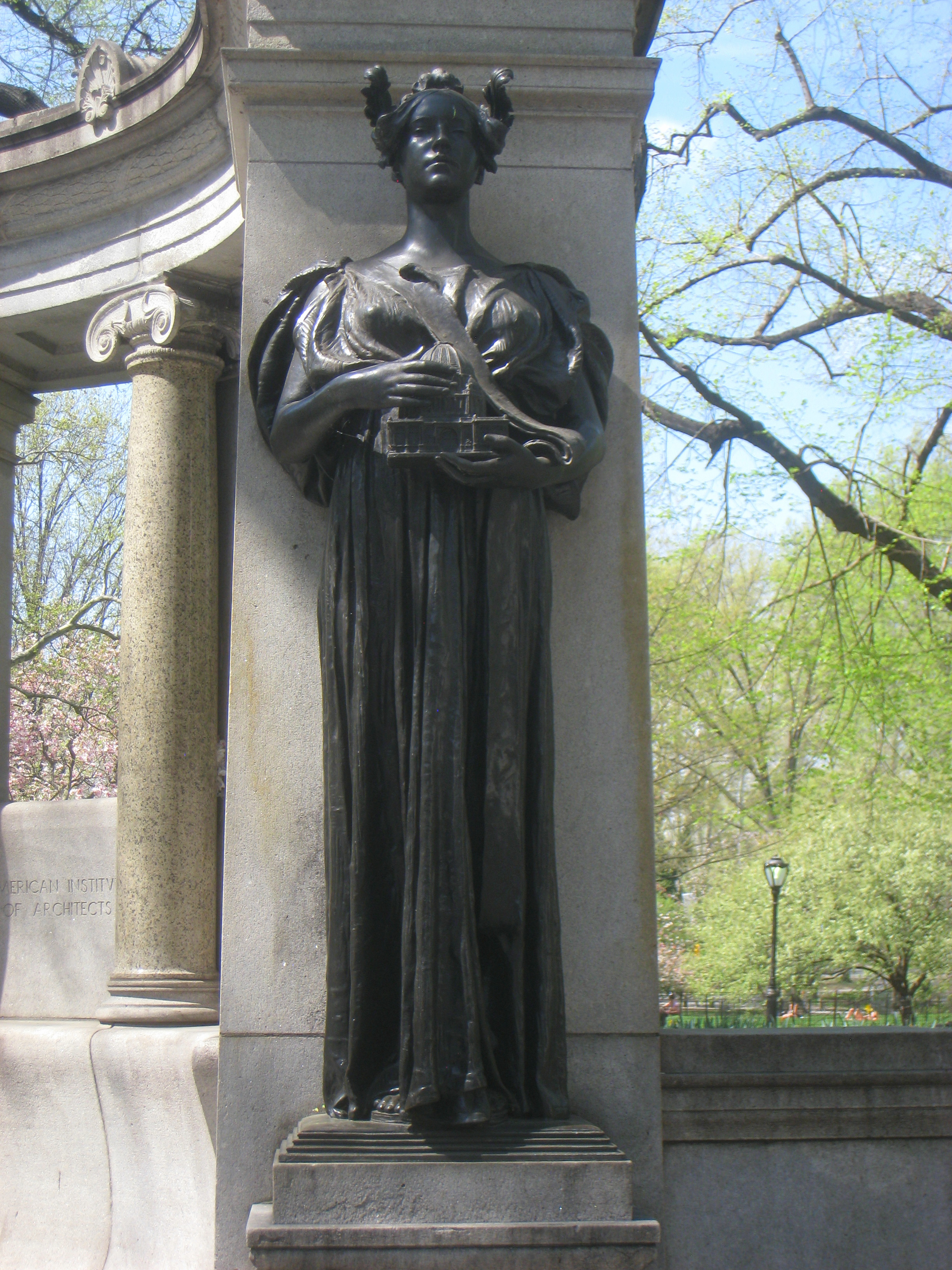
Architecture (1901), Richard Morris Hunt Memorial

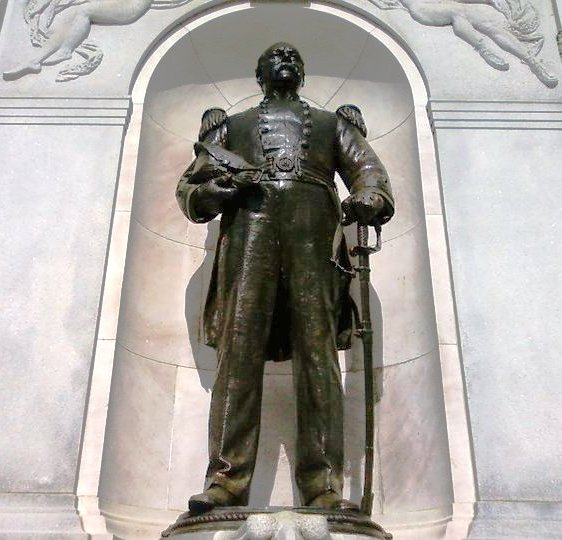
Statue of George H. Perkins (1902), New Hampshire State House, Concord, New Hampshire

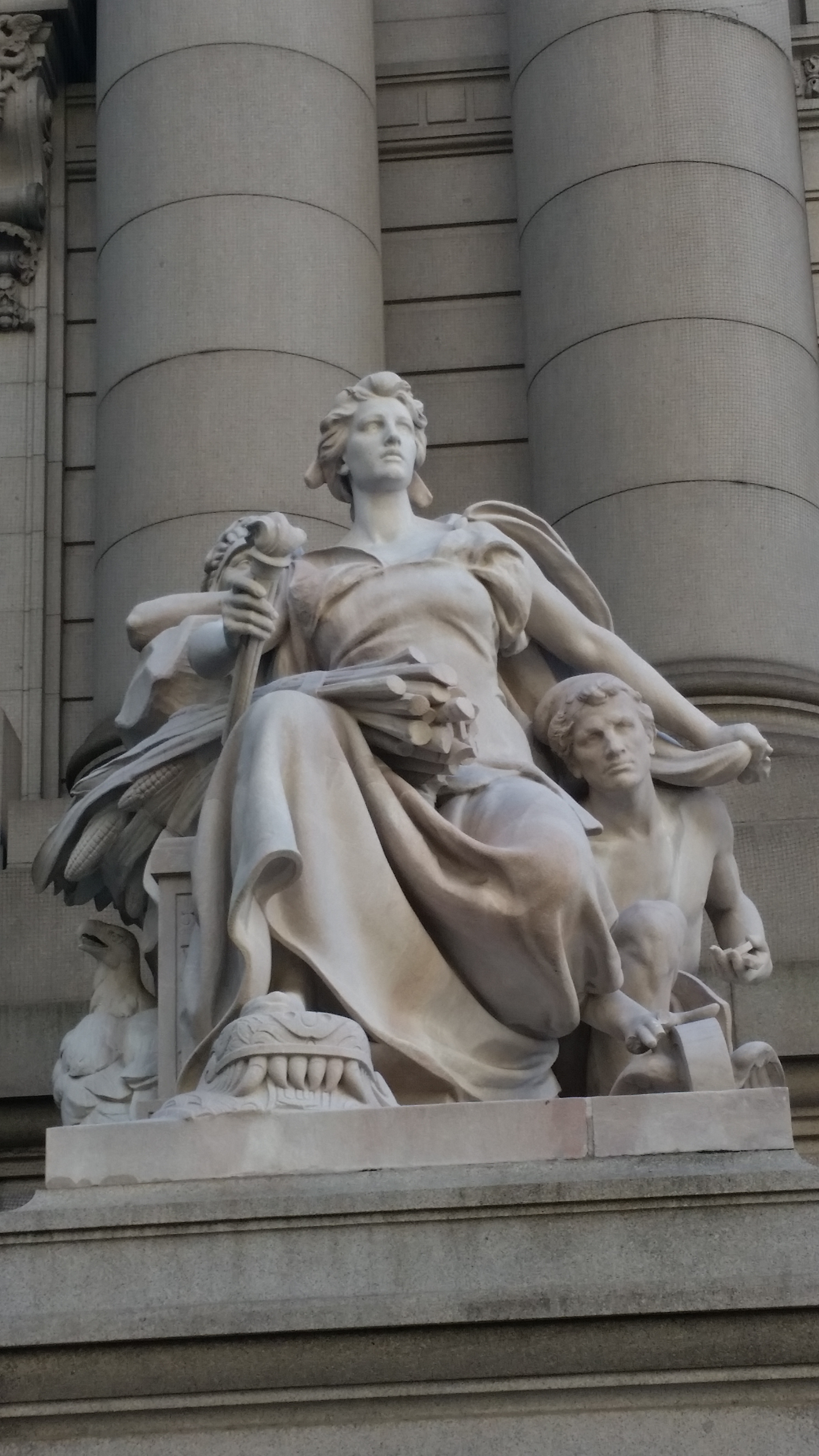
America, one of the Four Continents at the Alexander Hamilton U.S. Custom House in New York City

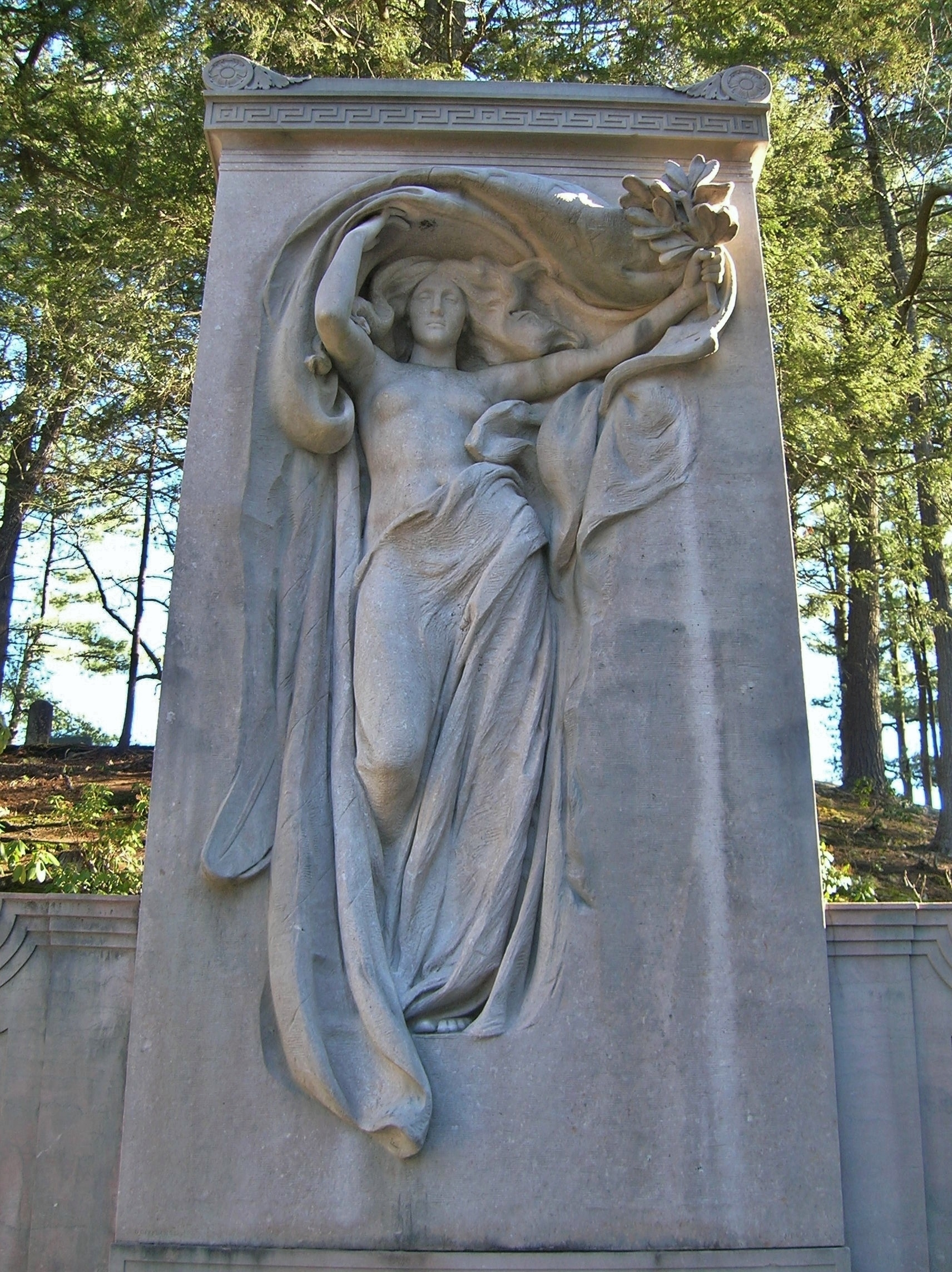
Melvin Memorial (1908), Sleepy Hollow Cemetery, Concord, Massachusetts

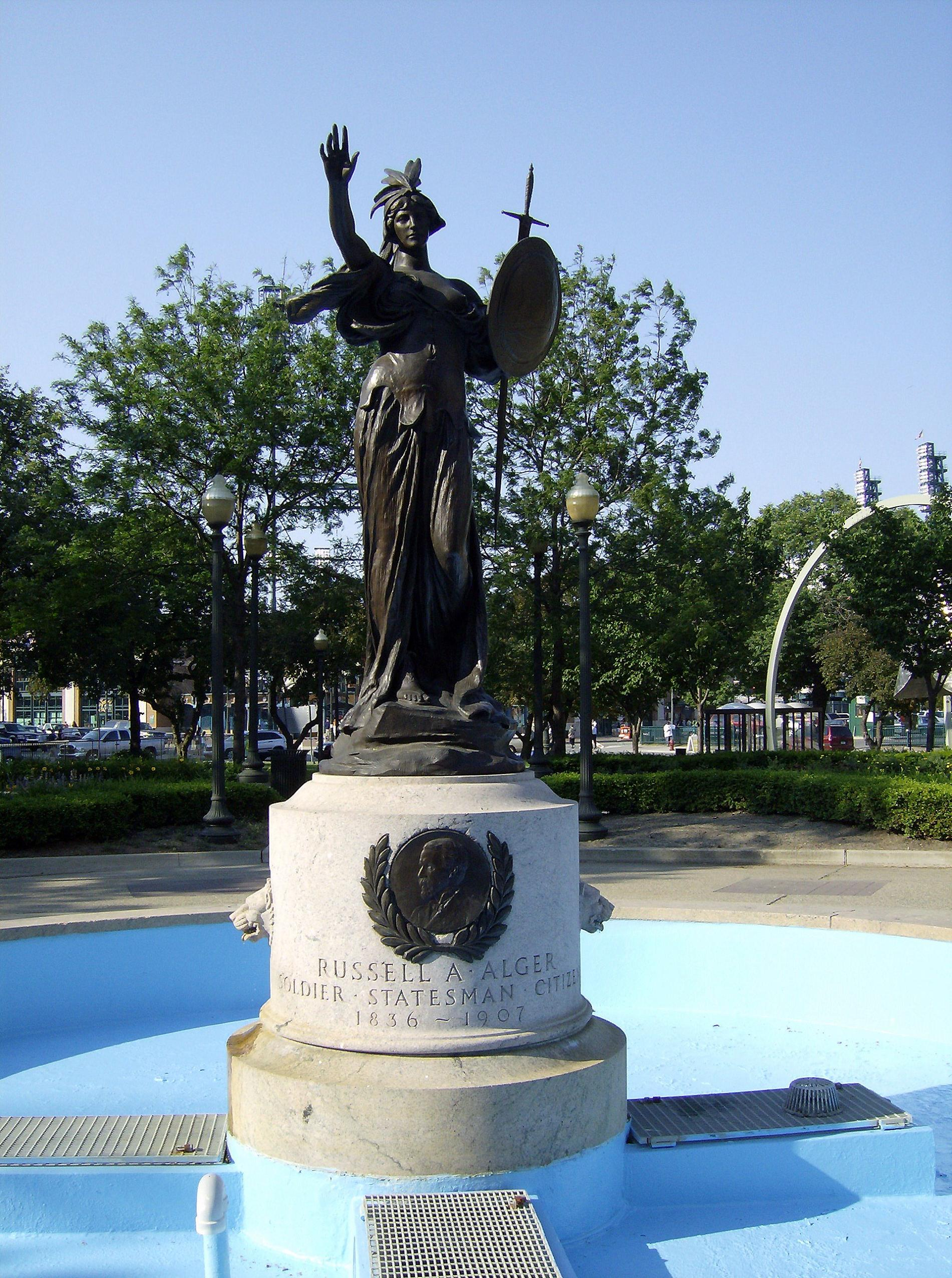
Russell A. Alger Fountain (1921), Detroit, Michigan

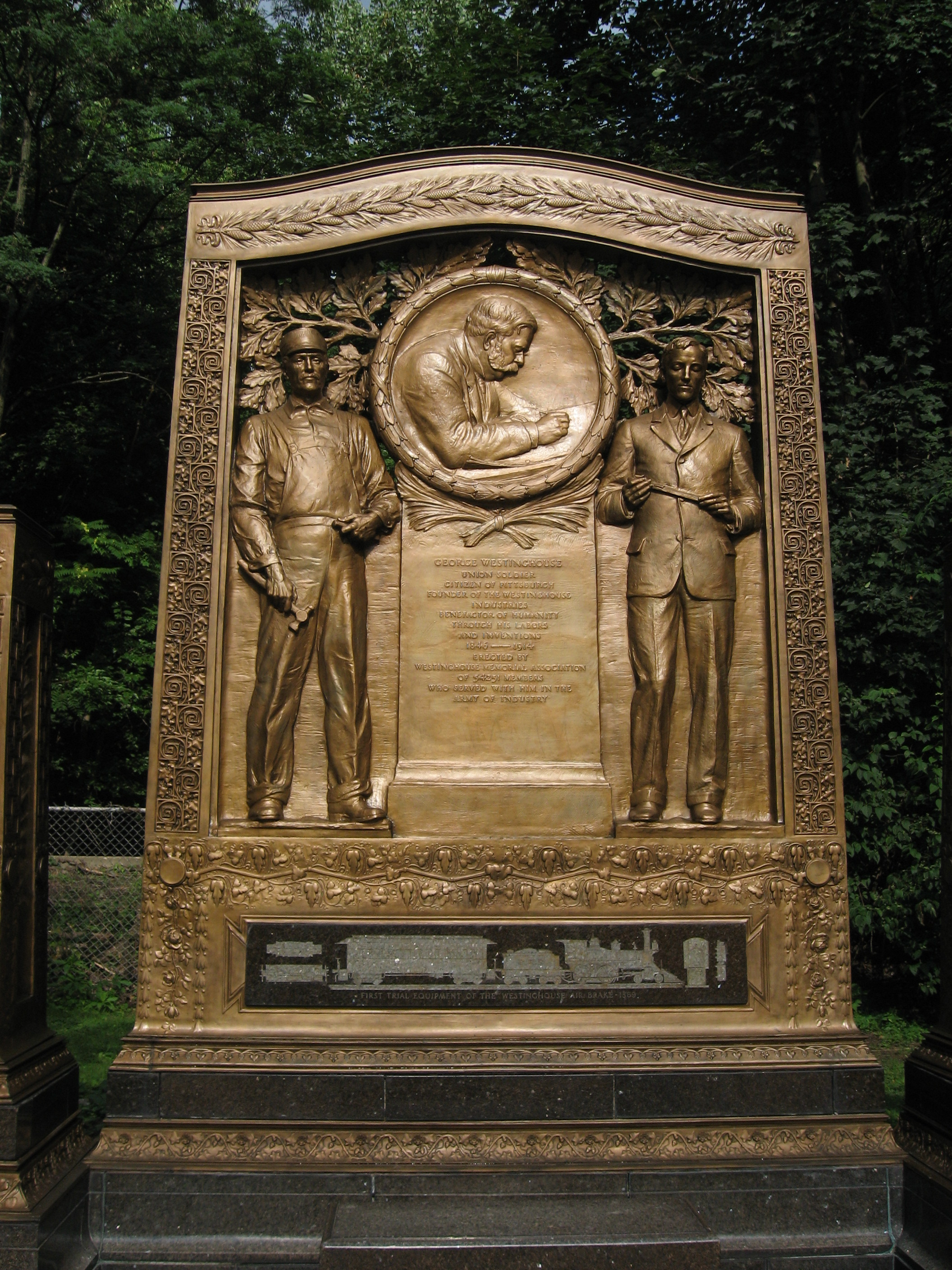
Westinghouse Memorial (1930), Pittsburgh, Pennsylvania.

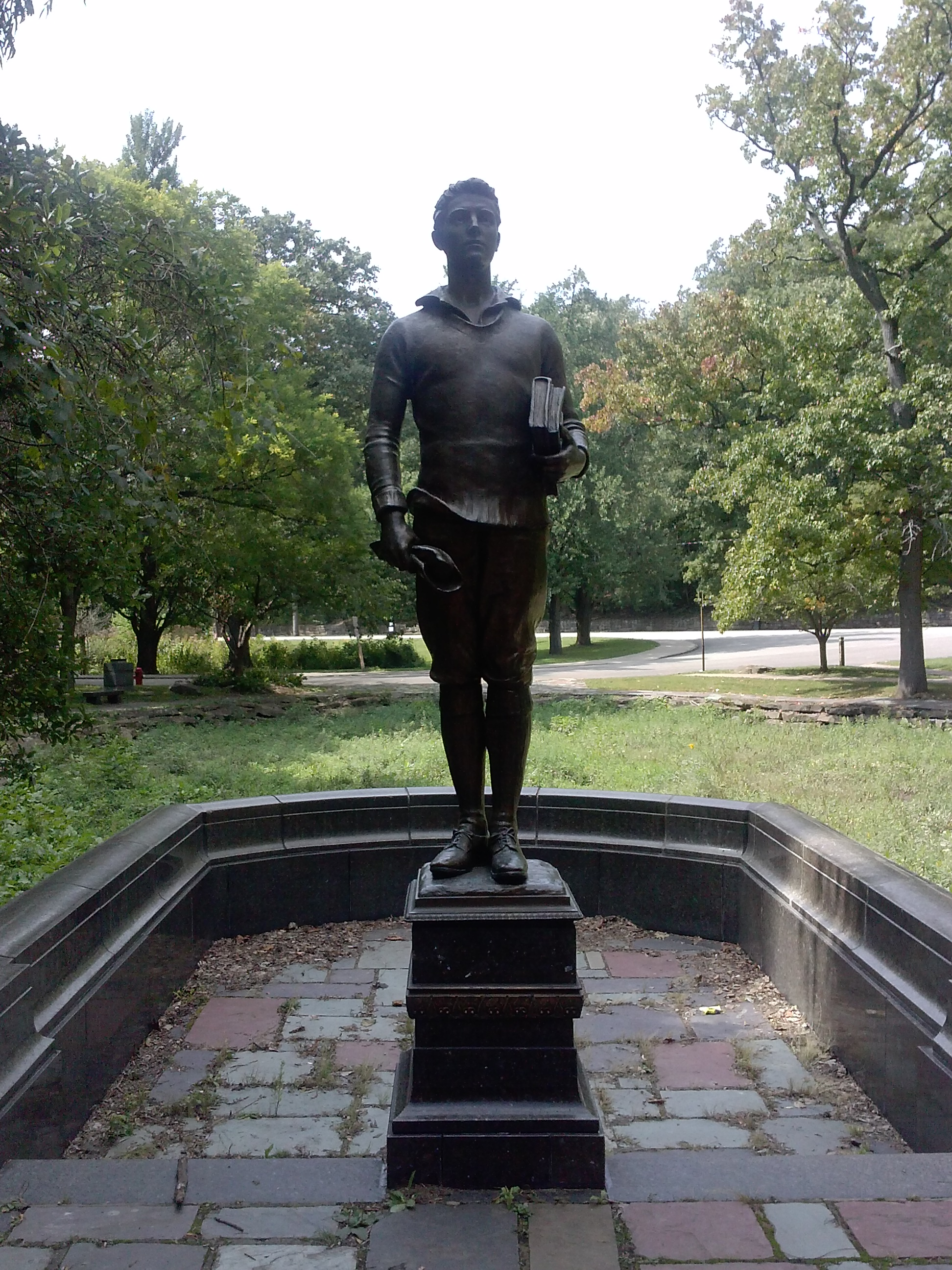
American Youth, Westinghouse Memorial (1930), Pittsburgh, Pennsylvania

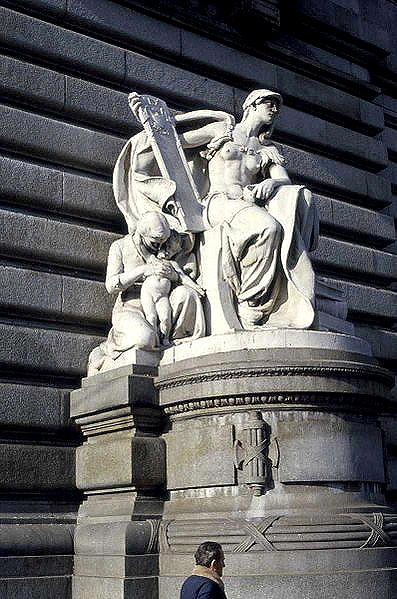
Jurisprudence, Federal Building, (1910) Cleveland, Ohio

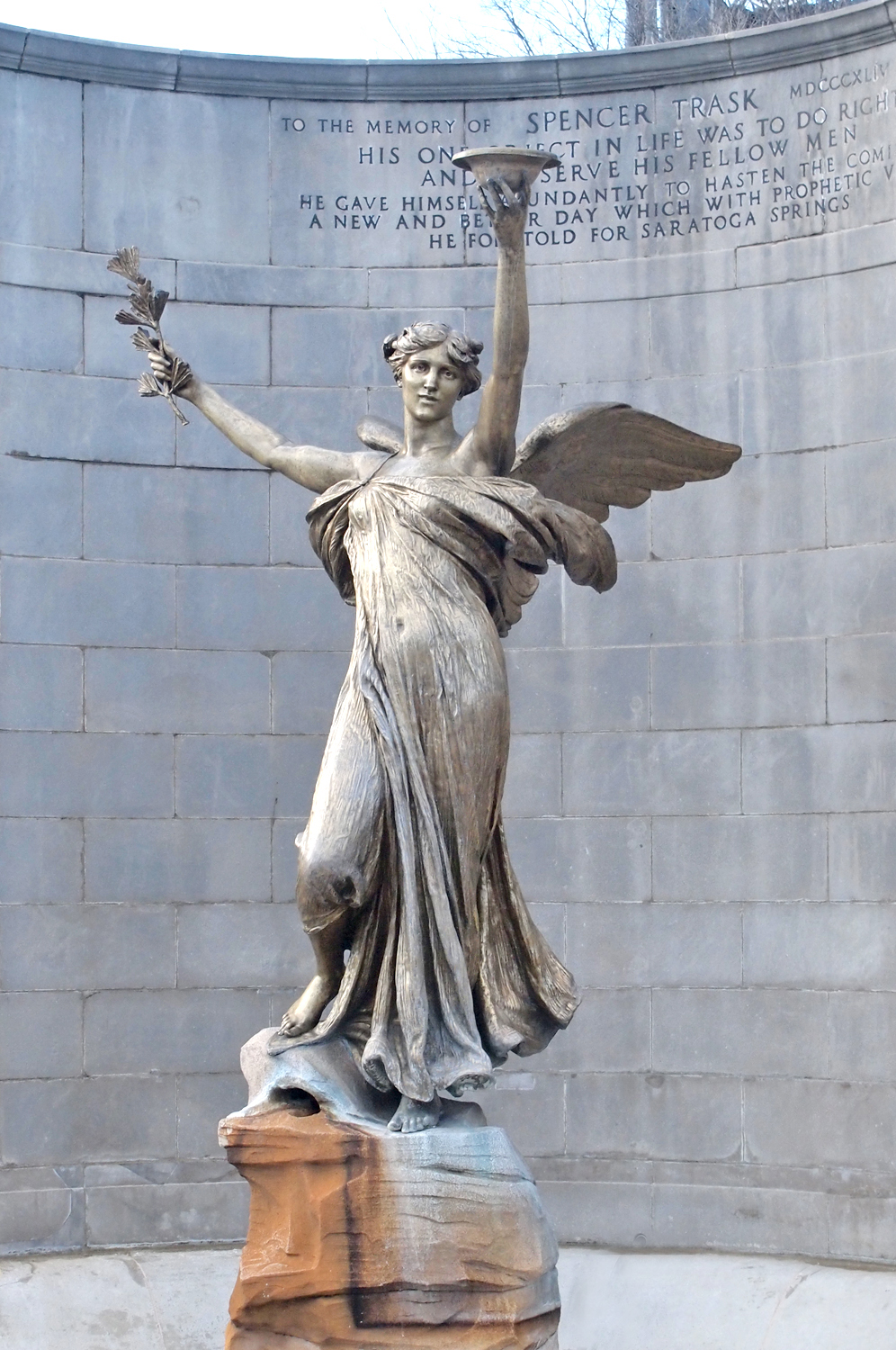
The Spirit of Life (1915), Congress Park, Saratoga Springs, NY

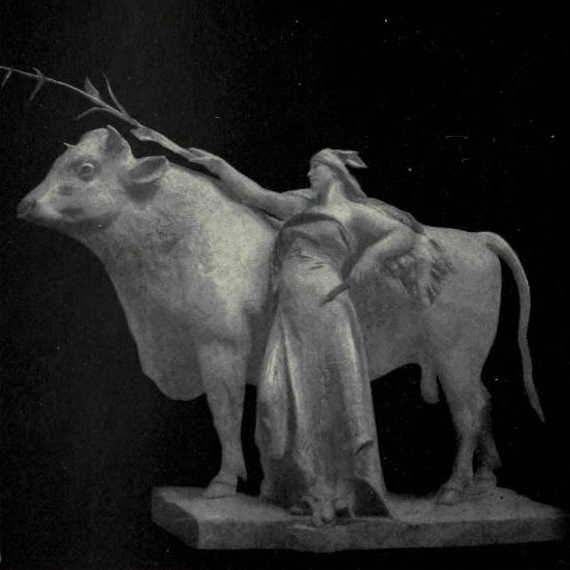
Indian Corn
(Bull by Edward Clark Potter)
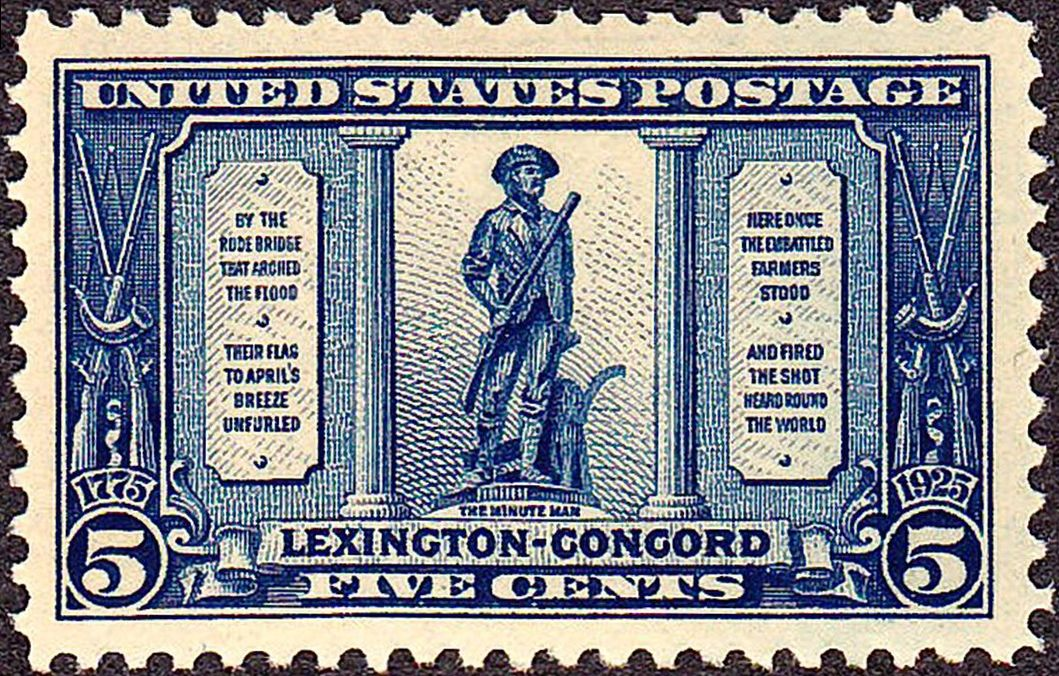
Daniel Chester French's The Minute Man depicted on US Postage Stamp, 1925 Issue, 5¢

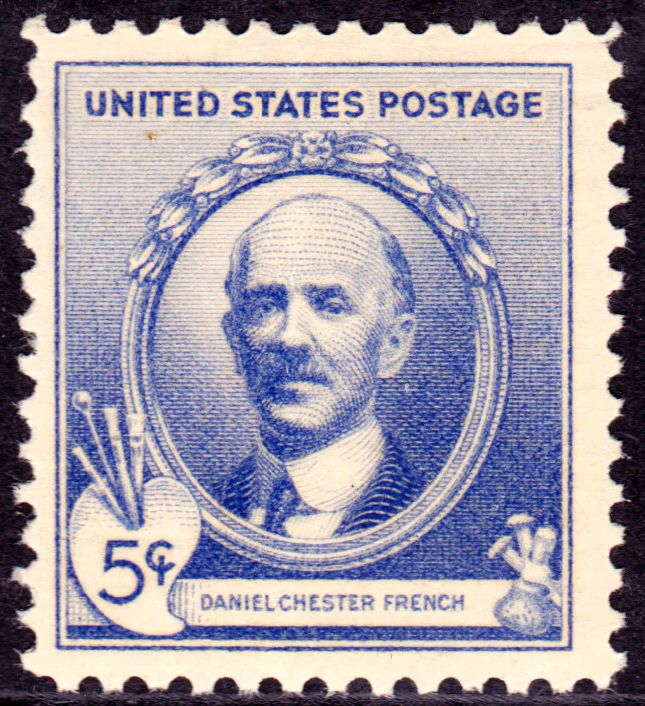
Daniel Chester French
Issue of 1940
